= Moroccan cuisine =

Culinary traditions of Morocco

Moroccan cuisine (Arabic: المطبخ المغربي Standard Moroccan Tamazight: ⴰⵙⵏⵡⵉ ⵏ ⵍⵎⴰⵖⵔⵉⴱ) is the cuisine of Morocco, fueled by interactions and exchanges with many cultures and nations over the centuries. Moroccan cuisine is usually a mix of Arab, Berber, Andalusi, Mediterranean and African cuisines, with minimal European (French and Spanish) influences. Traditional communal eating habits and ceremonial tea service are central to social gatherings. Like the rest of the Maghrebi cuisine, Moroccan cuisine has more in common with Middle Eastern cuisine than with the rest of Africa.

According to Moroccan chef and cuisine researcher Hossin Houari, the oldest traces of Moroccan cuisine that can still be observed today go back to the 7th century BC.

== History ==
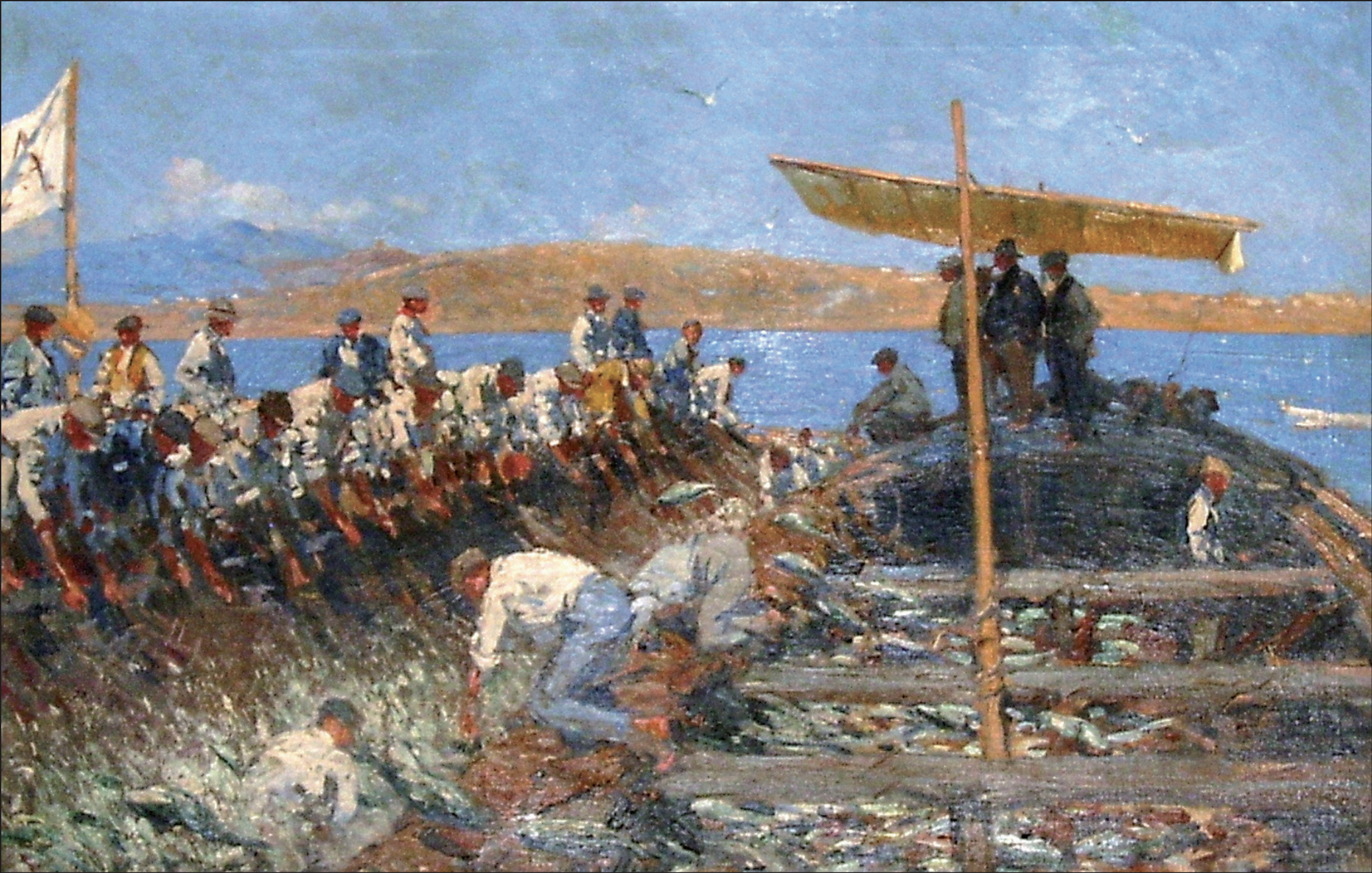
A depiction of almadraba, an ancient technique and practice for fishing bluefin tuna around the Strait of Gibraltar, in a painting by Mariano Bertuchi.

By the 7th century BC, coastal Phoenician colonies such as Sala and Kerne became centers of olive oil and wine production.

In the Roman period, there were factories for garum, a fermented fish sauce, in Cotta and Lixus, and Baetican olive oil amphorae are known to have been distributed in Mauretania Tingitana.

Couscoussiers dating back to the 12th century were found in the ruins of Igiliz, located in the Sous valley of Morocco.

According to food writer Charles Perry, couscous originated among the Berbers of Algeria and Morocco between the end of the 11th-century Zirid dynasty, modern-day Algeria, and the rise of the 13th-century Almohad Caliphate.

== Ingredients ==
Morocco produces a large range of Mediterranean fruits and vegetables, as well as tropical products like snails. Common meats include beef, goat, mutton and lamb, which, together with chicken and seafood, serve as a base for the cuisine. Characteristic flavorings include preserved lemon, argan oil, preserved butter (smen), olive oil, and dried fruits.

The staple grains today are rice and wheat, used for bread and couscous, though until the mid-20th century, barley was an important staple, especially in the south. Grapes are mostly eaten fresh, as a dessert; wine consumption is only about 1 liter per capita per year. The traditional cooking fats are butter and animal fat, though olive oil is now replacing them. Butter is used both fresh, zebda, and preserved, smen.

== Flavorings ==
Spices and ras el hanout are used extensively in Moroccan food. Although some spices have been imported to Morocco through the Arabs, introducing Persian and Arabic cooking influences, many ingredients—like saffron from Talaouine, mint and olives from Meknes, and oranges and lemons from Fes—are home-grown, and are being exported. After the Idrissids established Fes in 789, predominant in Arab culture, many spices were brought from the east. Common spices include cinnamon, cumin, turmeric, ginger, paprika, coriander, saffron, mace, cloves, fennel, anise, nutmeg, cayenne pepper, fenugreek, caraway, black pepper and sesame seeds. As many as twenty-seven spices are combined for the Moroccan spice mixture ras el hanout.

Common herbs in Moroccan cuisine include mint, parsley, coriander, oregano, peppermint, marjoram, verbena, sage and bay laurel.

== Structure of meals ==
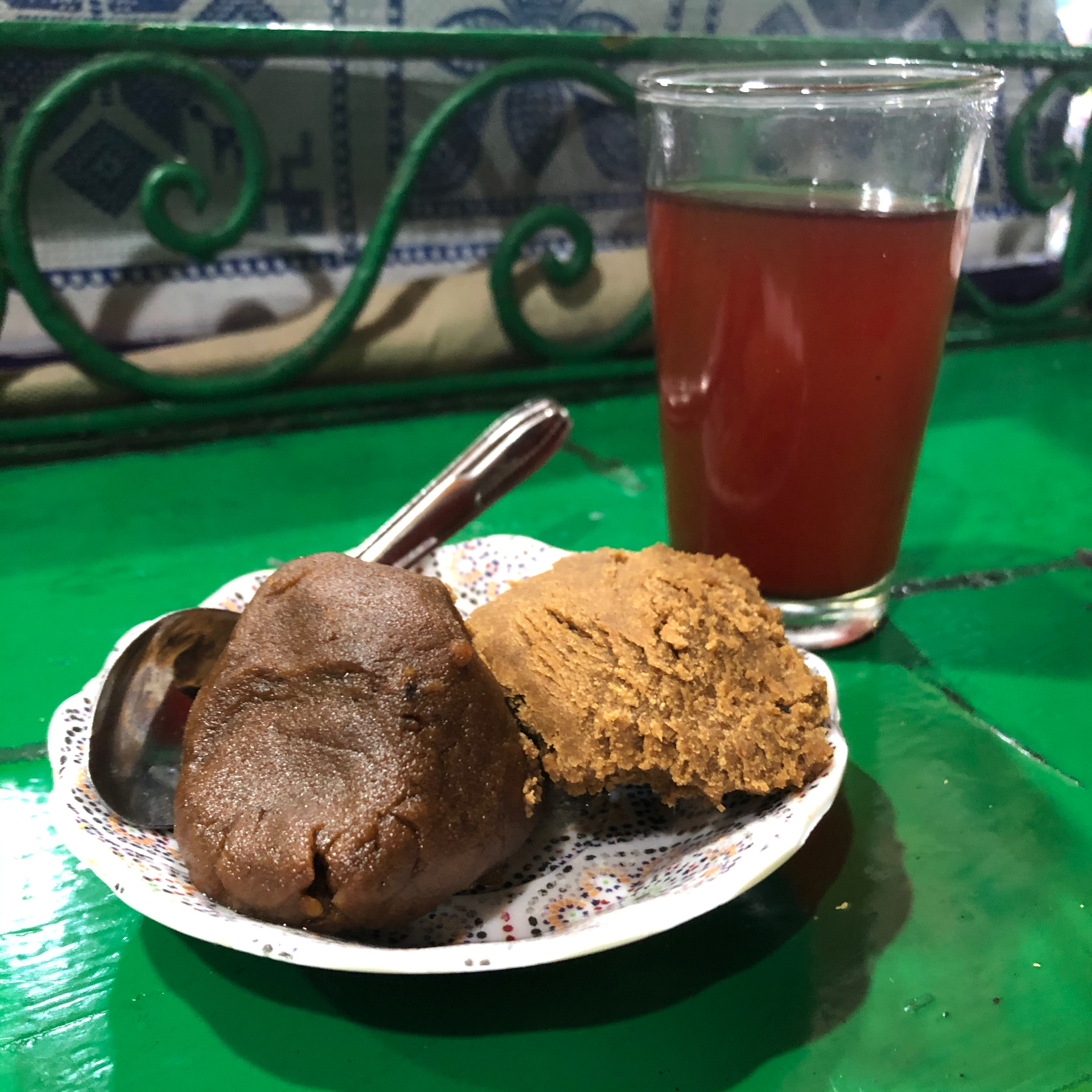
Khudenjal, a herbal tea based on Alpinia officinarum, and two types of sellou at Jemaa el-Fnaa in Marrakesh.

A typical lunch begins with a series of hot and cold salads, followed by a tagine or dwaz. Often, for a formal meal, a lamb or chicken dish is next, or couscous topped with meat and vegetables. Traditionally, Moroccans eat with their hands and use bread. The consumption of pork and alcohol is uncommon due to religious restrictions.

== Main dishes ==
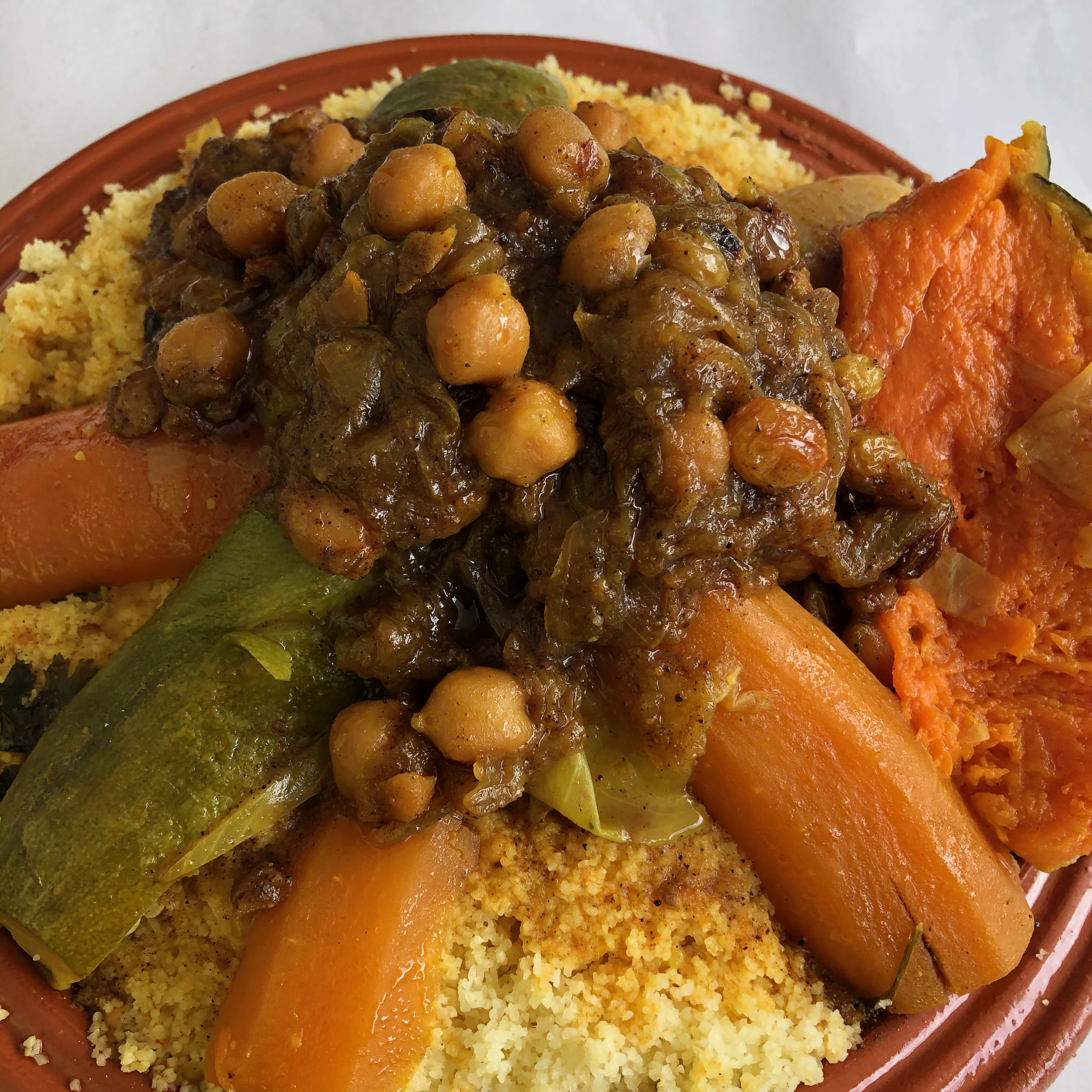
Couscous with vegetables, meat, and tfaya, a confection of caramelized onions, raisins, sugar, butter, and cinnamon.

The main Moroccan dish people are most familiar with is couscous; lamb is the most commonly eaten meat in Morocco, usually eaten in a tagine with a wide selection of vegetables. Chicken is also commonly used in tagines or roasted. They also use additional ingredients such as plums, boiled eggs, and lemon. Like their national food, the tagine is distinctly flavored with locally ubiquitous spices such as saffron, cumin, cinnamon, ginger, and cilantro, as well as ground red pepper. While meat-based tagines are prominent, everyday traditional home cooking incorporates a wide range of plant-based dishes utilizing legumes, olive oil, and regional spices.

Moroccan cuisine features many seafood dishes. European pilchard is caught in large but declining quantities. Other fish species include mackerel, anchovy, sardinella, and horse mackerel.

Other widely known Moroccan dishes are pastilla (also spelled basteeya or bestilla), tanjia, and rfissa.

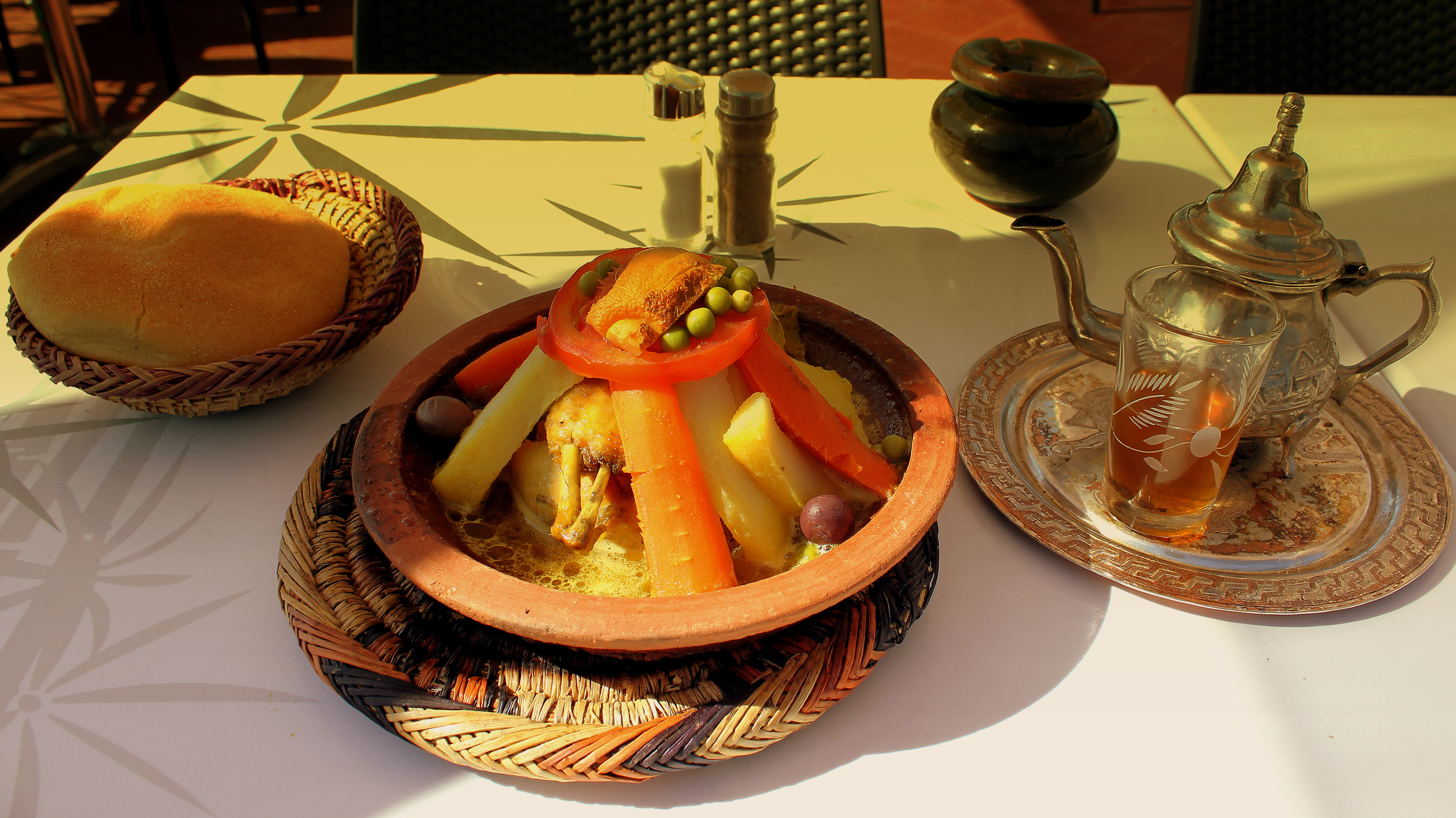
Tagine-cooked chicken and vegetables with mint tea and khobz el-dâr

A significant part of the daily meal is bread. Bread in Morocco is principally made from durum wheat semolina known as khobz. Bakeries are common throughout Morocco and fresh bread is a staple in every city, town, and village. The most common is whole-grain coarse-ground or white-flour bread or baguettes. There are also a number of flat breads and pulled unleavened pan-fried breads.

In addition, there are dried salted meats and salted preserved meats such as khlea and g'did (basically sheep bacon), which are used to flavor tagines or used in el rghaif, a folded savory Moroccan pancake.

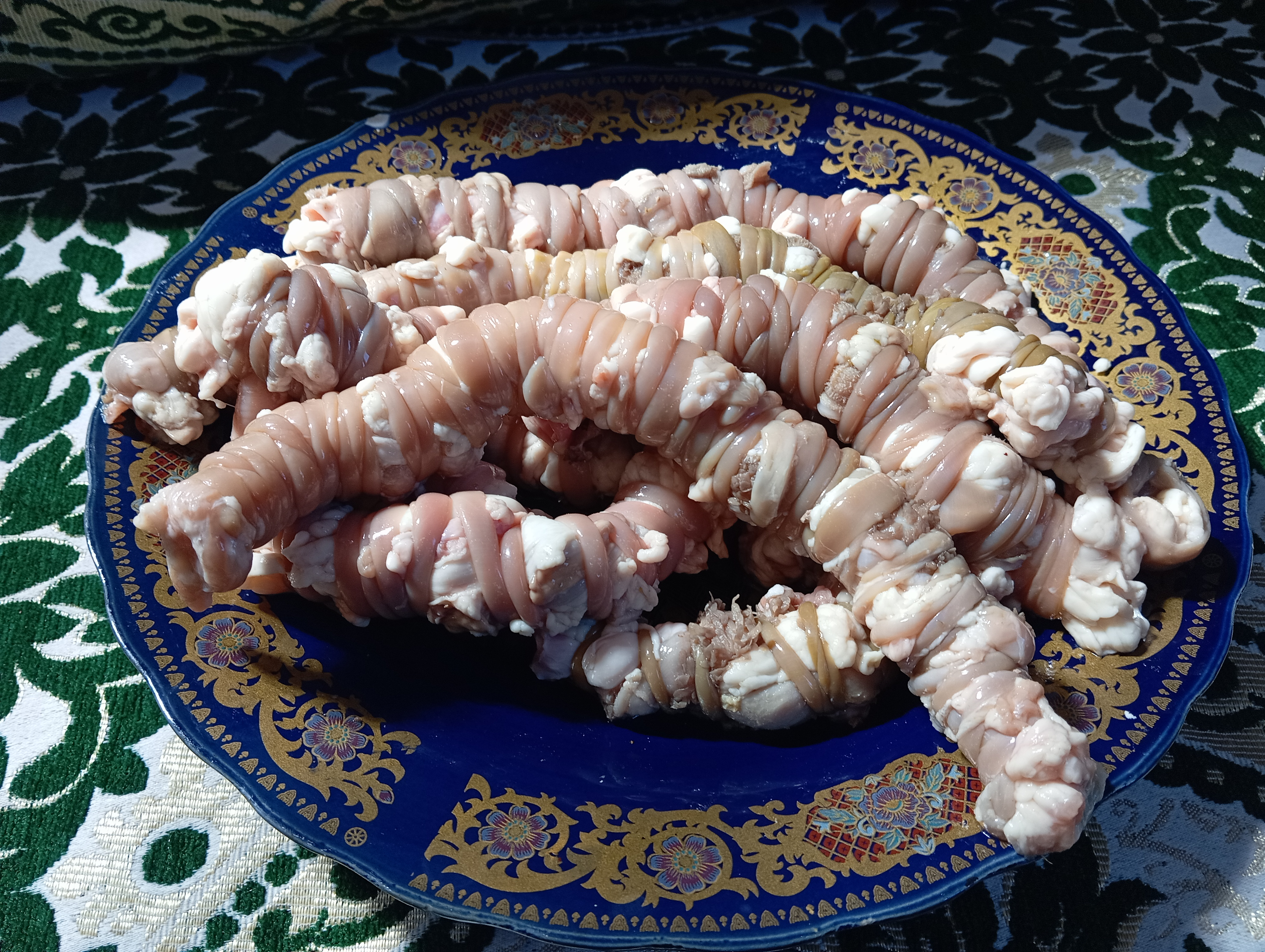
Kourdass, a salted preserved meat dish made from lamb offal, sun-dried then boiled

== Soups ==
Harira, a typical heavy soup, is eaten during winter to warm up and is usually served for dinner. It is typically eaten with plain bread or with dates during the month of Ramadan. Bissara is a broad bean-based soup that is also consumed during the colder months of the year.

Beboush, a savory and slightly spicy snail soup, is a traditional delicacy in Moroccan cuisine. It is made by simmering snails in broth infused with aromatic spices, including cumin, coriander, and mint.

== Salads ==
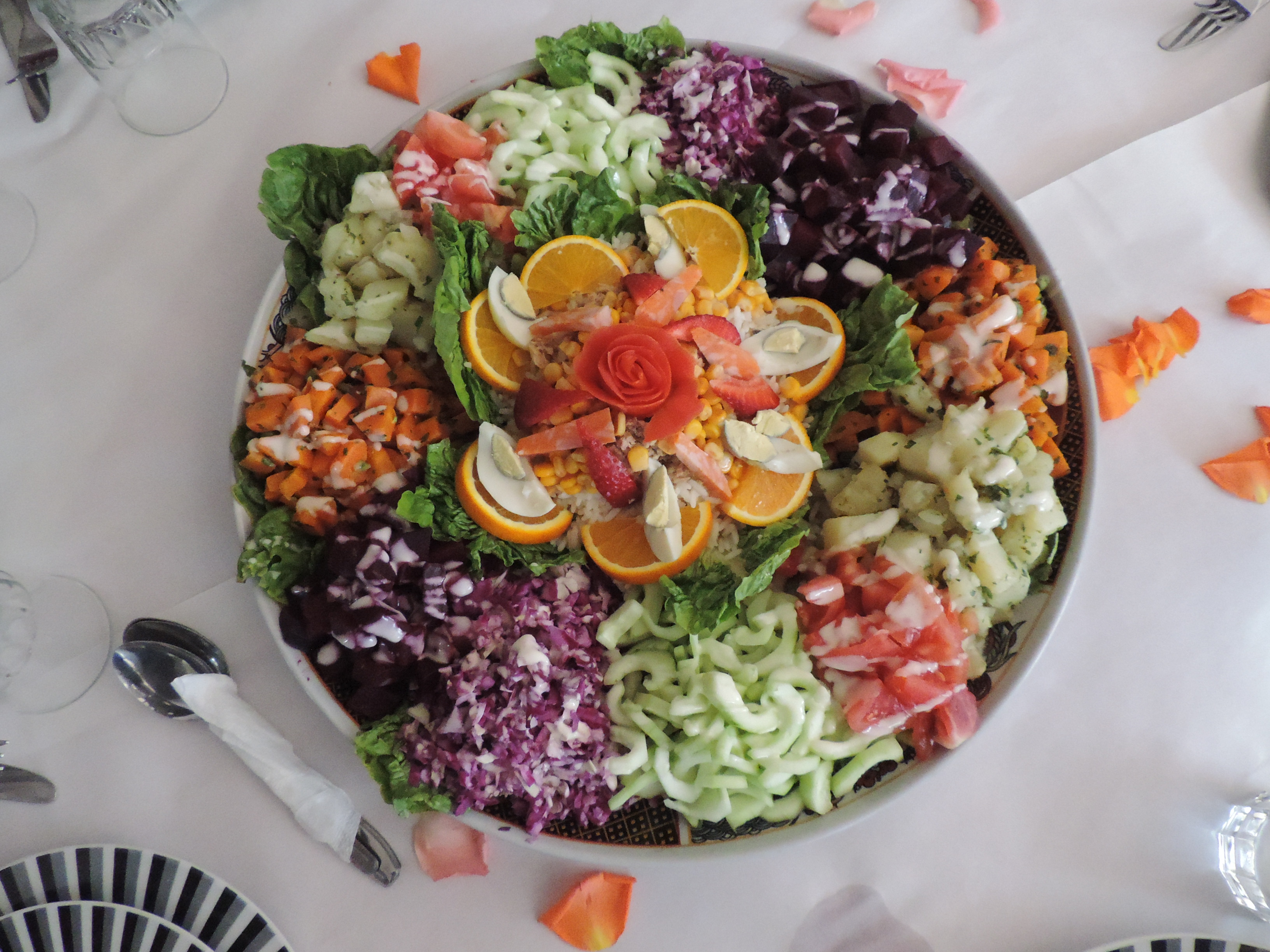
Salad asorti, served in Beni Mellal

Salads include both raw and cooked vegetables, served either hot or cold. They include zaalouk, an aubergine and tomato mixture, and taktouka, a mixture of tomatoes, smoked green peppers, garlic, and spices characteristic of the cities of Taza and Fes in the Atlas. Another salad is called bakoula or khoubiza, consisting of braised mallow leaves, but can also be made with spinach or arugula, with parsley, cilantro, lemon, olive oil, and olives.

== Desserts ==
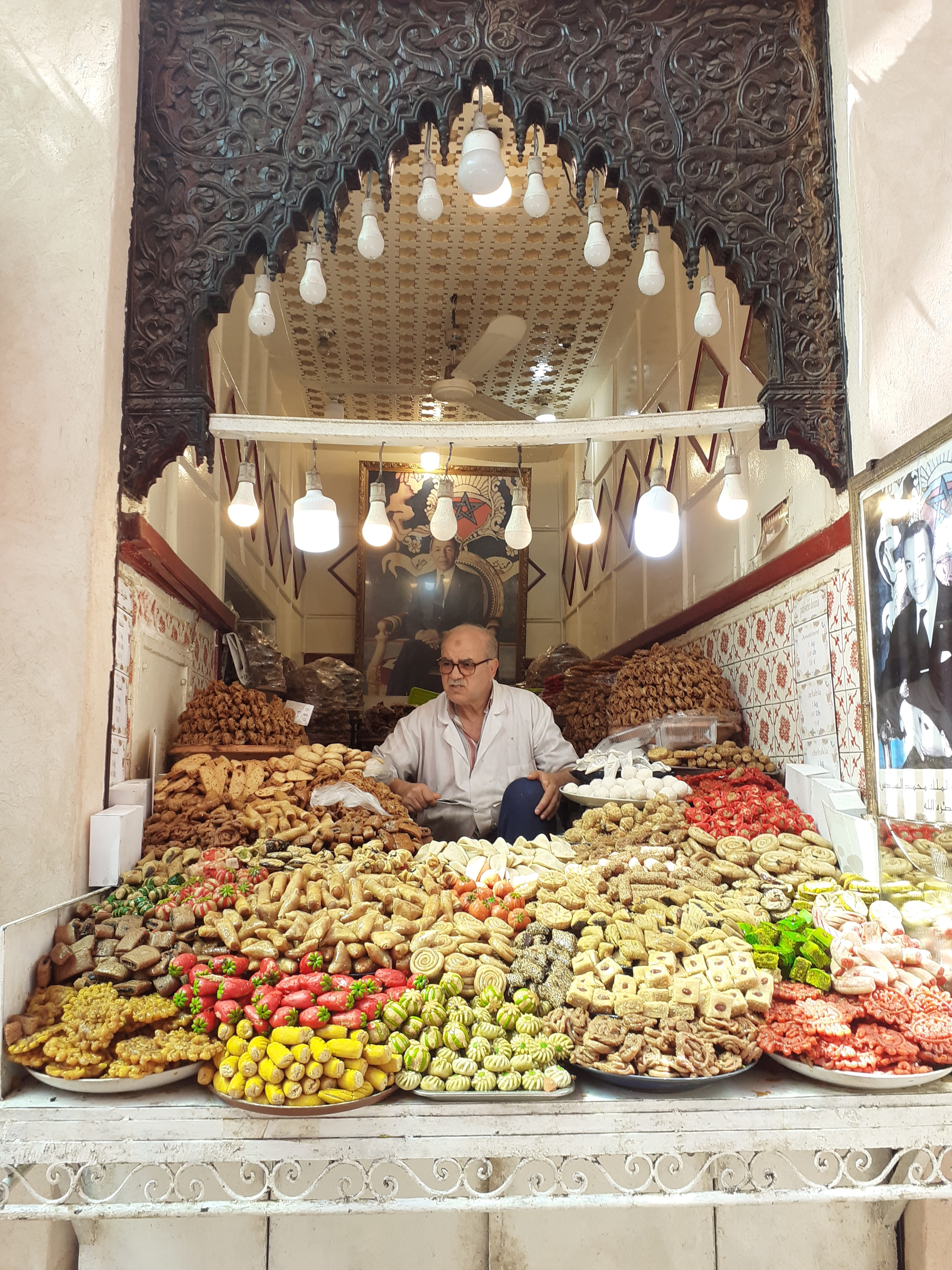
Moroccan traditional cookies seller in the old Medina in Marrakech

Usually, seasonal fruits rather than cooked desserts are served at the close of a meal. A common dessert is kaab el ghzal (كعب الغزال, 'gazelle ankles'), a pastry stuffed with almond paste and topped with sugar. Another is halwa chebakia, pretzel-shaped dough deep-fried, soaked in honey and sprinkled with sesame seeds; it is eaten during Ramadan. Jowhara is typical of Fes, made with fried waraq pastry, cream, and toasted almond slices. Coconut fudge cakes, 'zucre coco', are also common.

== Seafood ==
Morocco is endowed with over 3000 km of coastline. There is an abundance of fish in these coastal waters with the sardine being commercially significant as Morocco is the world's largest exporter. Sardines were used in the production of garum in Lixus.

At Moroccan fish markets, one can find sole, swordfish, tuna, turbot, mackerel, shrimp, conger eel, skate, red snapper, spider crab, lobster and a variety of mollusks.

In Moroccan cuisine, seafood is incorporated into, among others, tajines, bastilla, briouat, and paella.

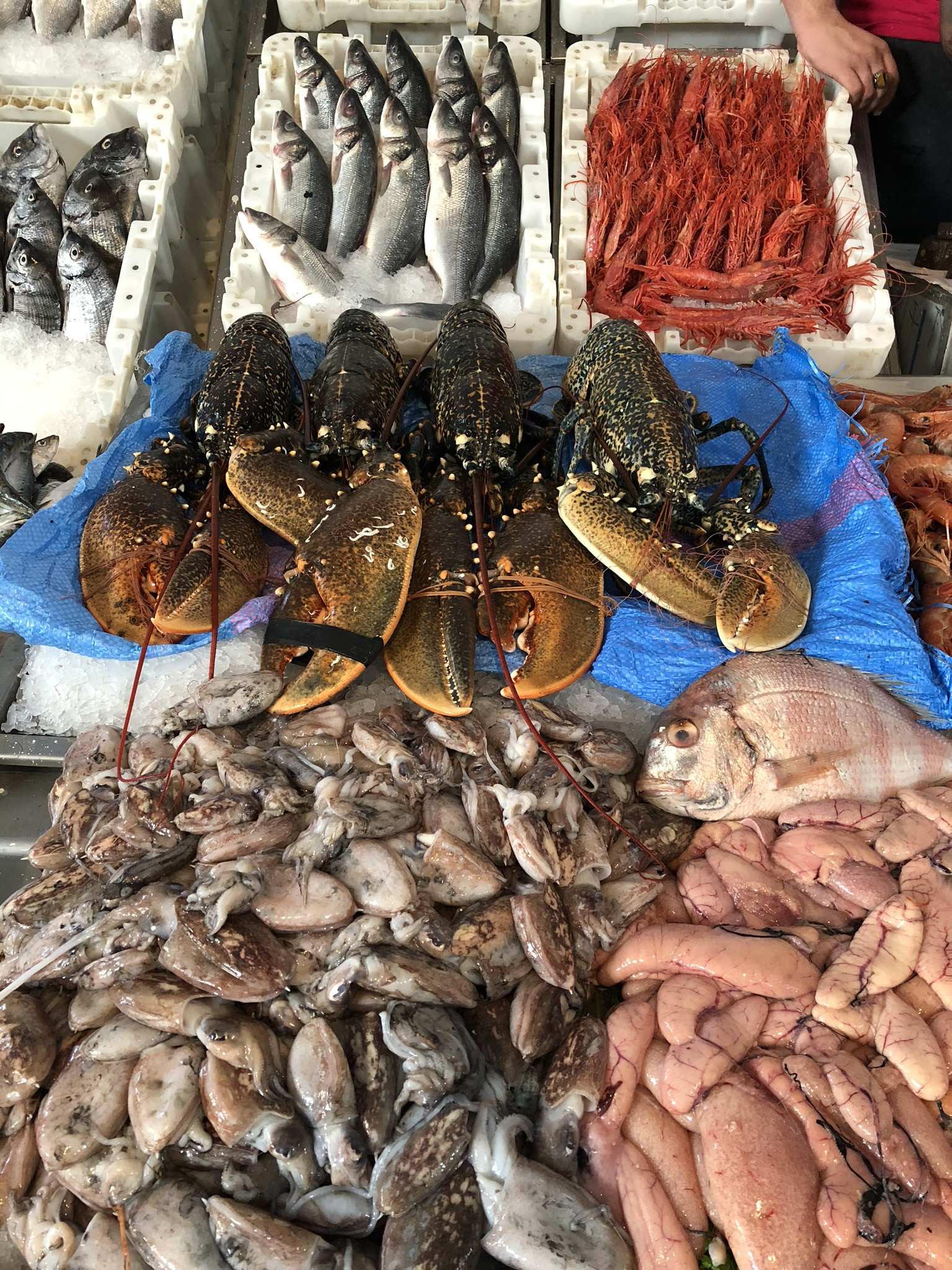
Seafood for sale at Casablanca's Central Market

== Drinks ==
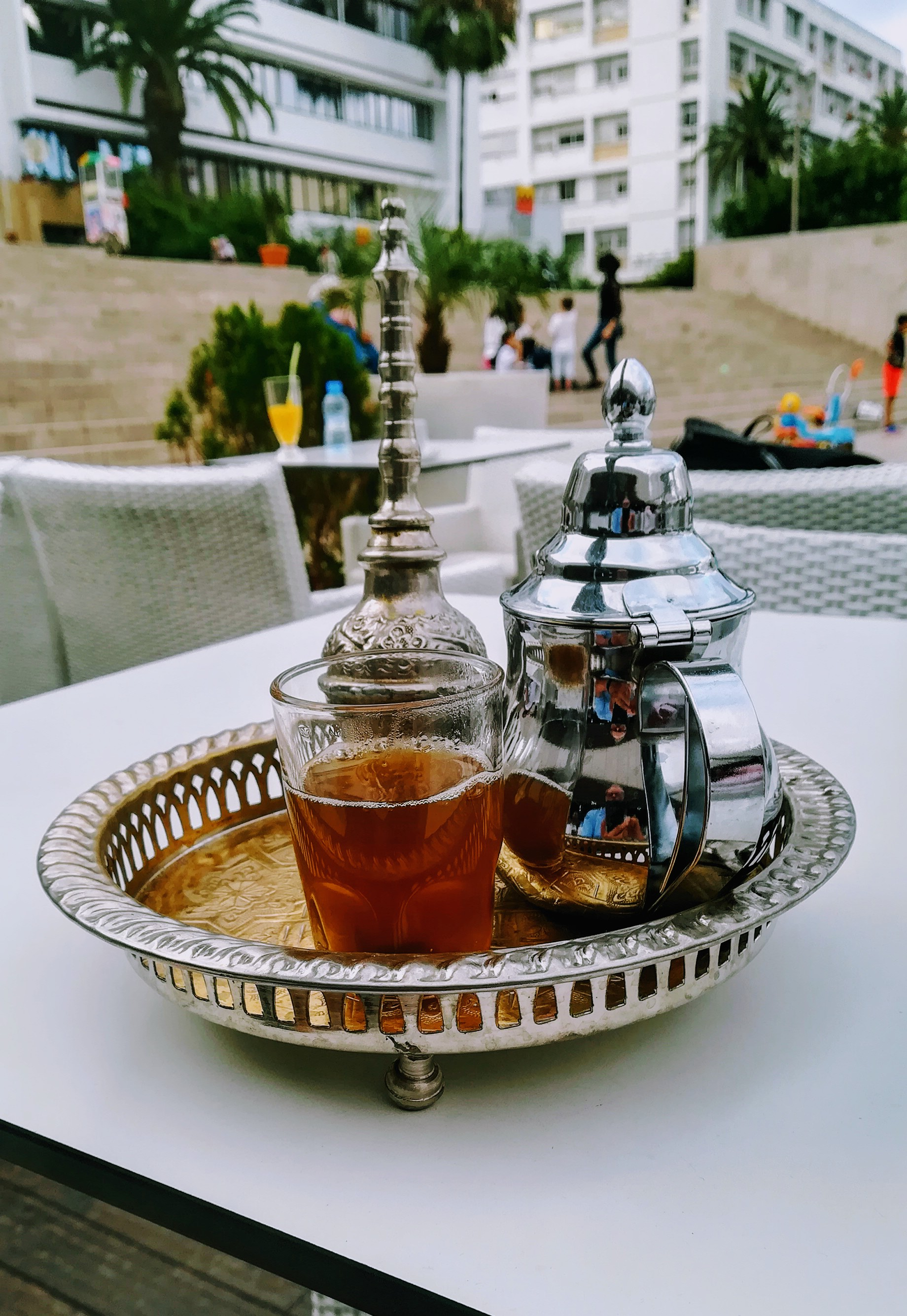
Moroccan mint tea

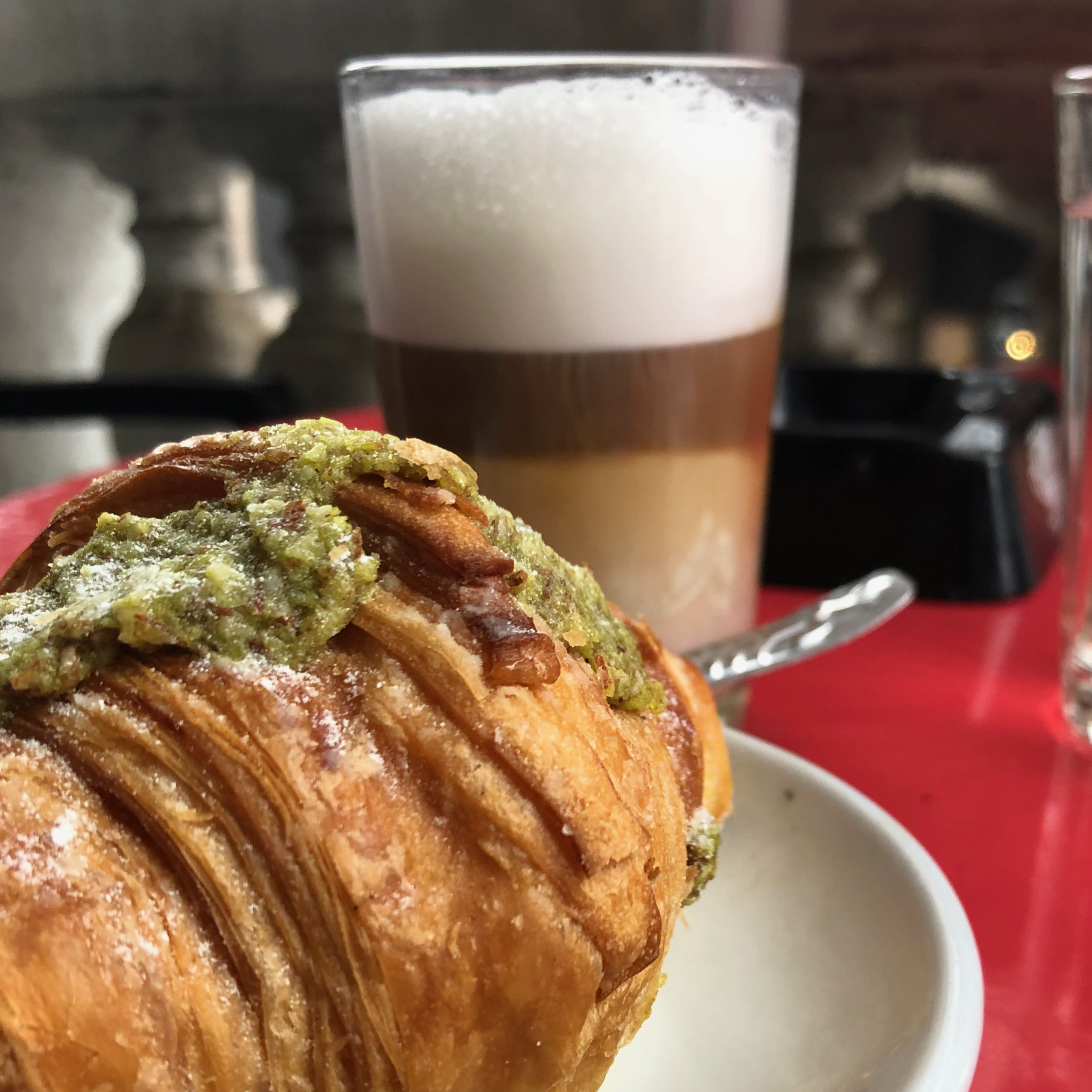
A pistachio croissant served with a nuṣṣ-nuṣṣ (نص-نص "half-half," a Moroccan variant of café crème), served at a café in Casablanca.

The most popular drink is Moroccan mint tea, locally called atay. Traditionally, making good mint tea in Morocco is considered an art form and the drinking of it with friends and family is often a daily tradition. The pouring technique is as crucial as the quality of the tea itself. Moroccan tea pots have long, curved pouring spouts and this allows the tea to be poured evenly into tiny glasses from a height. For the best taste, glasses are filled in two stages. The Moroccans traditionally like tea with bubbles, so while pouring they hold the teapot high above the glasses. Finally, the tea is accompanied by hard sugar cones or lumps. Morocco has an abundance of oranges and tangerines, so fresh orange juice is easily found and inexpensive.

== Snacks and fast food ==
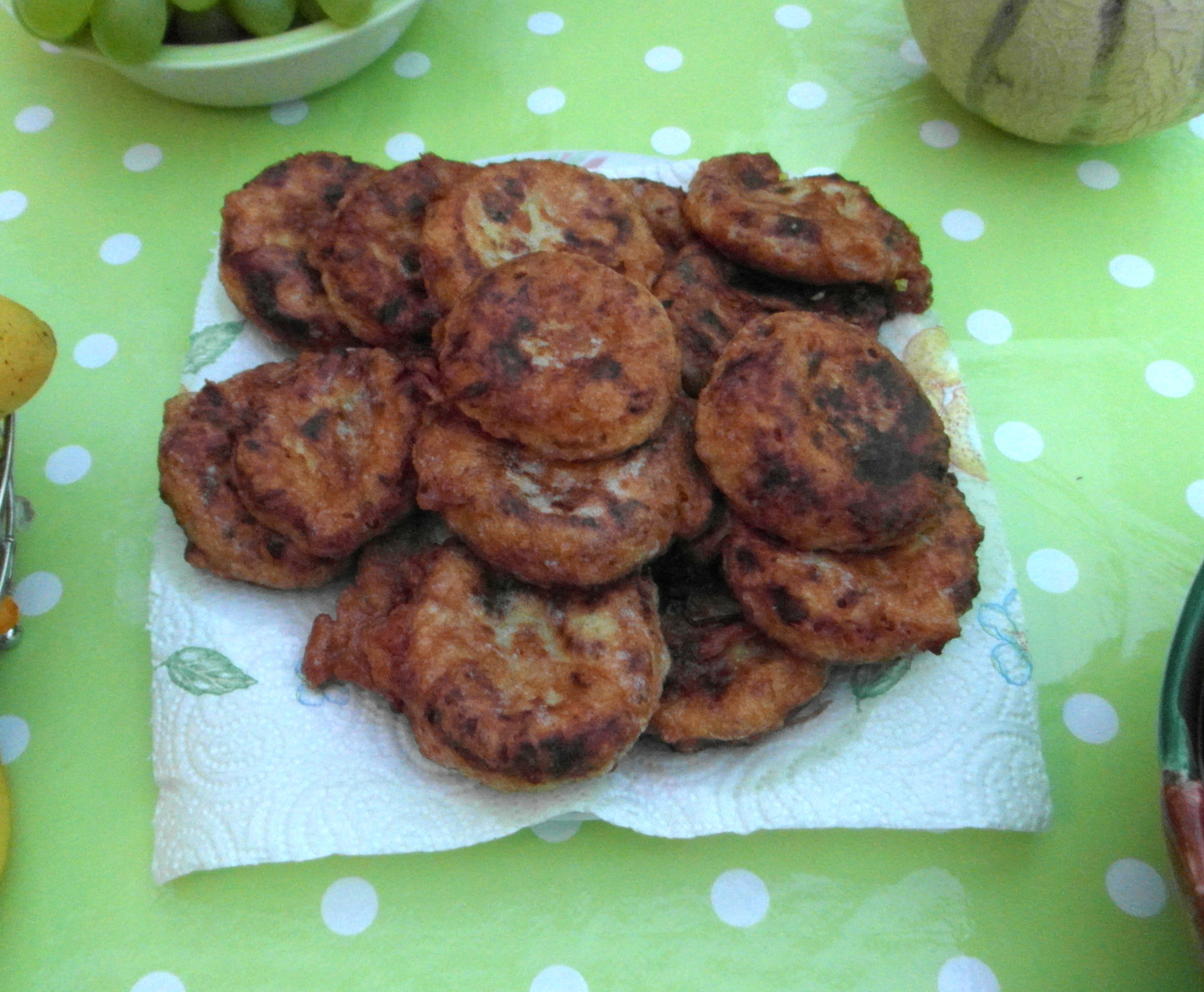
Ma'quda

Selling fast food in the street has long been a tradition, and the best example is Djemaa el Fna square in Marrakesh. Ma'quda is a potato fritter eaten by students and people of modest means, particularly in Fes. Starting in the 1980s, new snack restaurants, primarily in the north, started serving bocadillos (Spanish for 'sandwich').

Dairy product shops locally called mhlaba (محْلَبة), are prevalent all around the country. Those dairy stores generally offer all types of dairy products, juices, smoothies, and local fare such as bocadillos, msemmen and harcha.

The khanz u-bnīn (خانز وبنين "dirty and delicious") is an inexpensive, frequently seen street sandwich.

Another common street food in Morocco is snails, served in their juices in small bowls and eaten using a toothpick.

In the late 1990s, several multinational fast-food franchises opened restaurants in major cities.

== Chefs ==
Among those who have brought Moroccan cuisine to a wider audience are TV chef Choumicha and Al-Amīn al-Hajj Mustafa an-Nakīr, chef to the former king of Morocco Hassan II.

Fatéma Hal, who opened a Moroccan cuisine restaurant in Paris named Mansouria, has been regarded by Le Figaro as "one of the most renowned ambassadors of Moroccan cuisine".

== See also ==
- Beer in Morocco
- Culture of Morocco
- History of Morocco
- Tourism in Morocco
- Languages in Morocco
- Moroccan Jewish cuisine
- List of African cuisines
- Maghrebi cuisine
