= Couscoussier =

Double-chambered food steamer used in Amazigh and North African cuisines

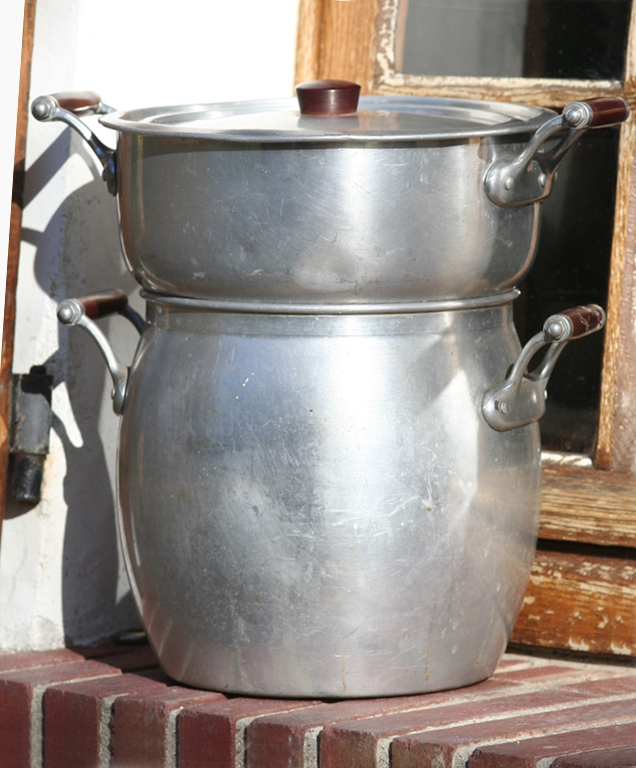

A couscoussier (Arabic: كسكاس, romanized: kaskās) (Berber languages: ⵜⴰⵙⴽⵙⵓⵜ, romanized: tasksut) is a traditional double-chambered food steamer used in North African and Amazigh cuisine (particularly, the cuisines of Libya, Tunisia, Algeria and Morocco) to cook couscous.

This container is composed of:

- from a lower part, the pot, usually containing water, vegetables, red or white meats. It plays a double role in cooking couscous: boiling the vegetables and meats it contains and providing hot water steam.
- an upper part, also called a "couscoussière": a kind of sieve, the bottom of which is pierced with holes, allowing steam to pass through for the cooking of the couscous.

The cooking of food (vegetables, meats, broth) inside the lower part of this container, over a low heat, and couscous, is possible provided that the assembly of the two containers is watertight, not allowing the steam thus produced to escape, which is why in general it is necessary to surround the interlocking of the two parts with a strip of cloth soaked in oil and paste (couscous residues) to prevent the loss of steam.

The two interlocking pots, made of either the traditional ceramic, or metal (steel, aluminium or copper). The first, which is the larger one, holds water or soup used to produce steam. The second, the smaller pot, is designed to be placed on top of the first, and has a lid and a perforated floor, so that it holds the couscous in place while allowing the steam to enter and seep through the grains. Once the couscous is steam-cooked, the lower pot may be used to simmer and complete its cooking, in order to serve the prepared dish.

== See also ==
- List of cooking vessels
