= Briouat =

Moroccan traditional pastry

Briouat / Briwat
- Briouat in a variety of shapes and fillings
- Type: Puff pastry
- Place of origin: Morocco
- Main ingredients: Meat (chicken or lamb), or (fish and shrimp), cheese, lemon, black pepper; herbs, spices

A brioua or briwa, plural briwat (Arabic: بريوات) is a sweet or savory turnover made with puff pastry. It is part of the Moroccan cuisine. Briwat are filled with meat (mostly chicken or lamb) or fish and shrimp, mixed with cheese, lemon and pepper. They are wrapped in warqa (a paper-thin dough) in a triangular or cylindrical shape. Briwat can also be sweet, filled with almond or peanut paste and fried, then dipped in warm honey flavored with orange blossom water.

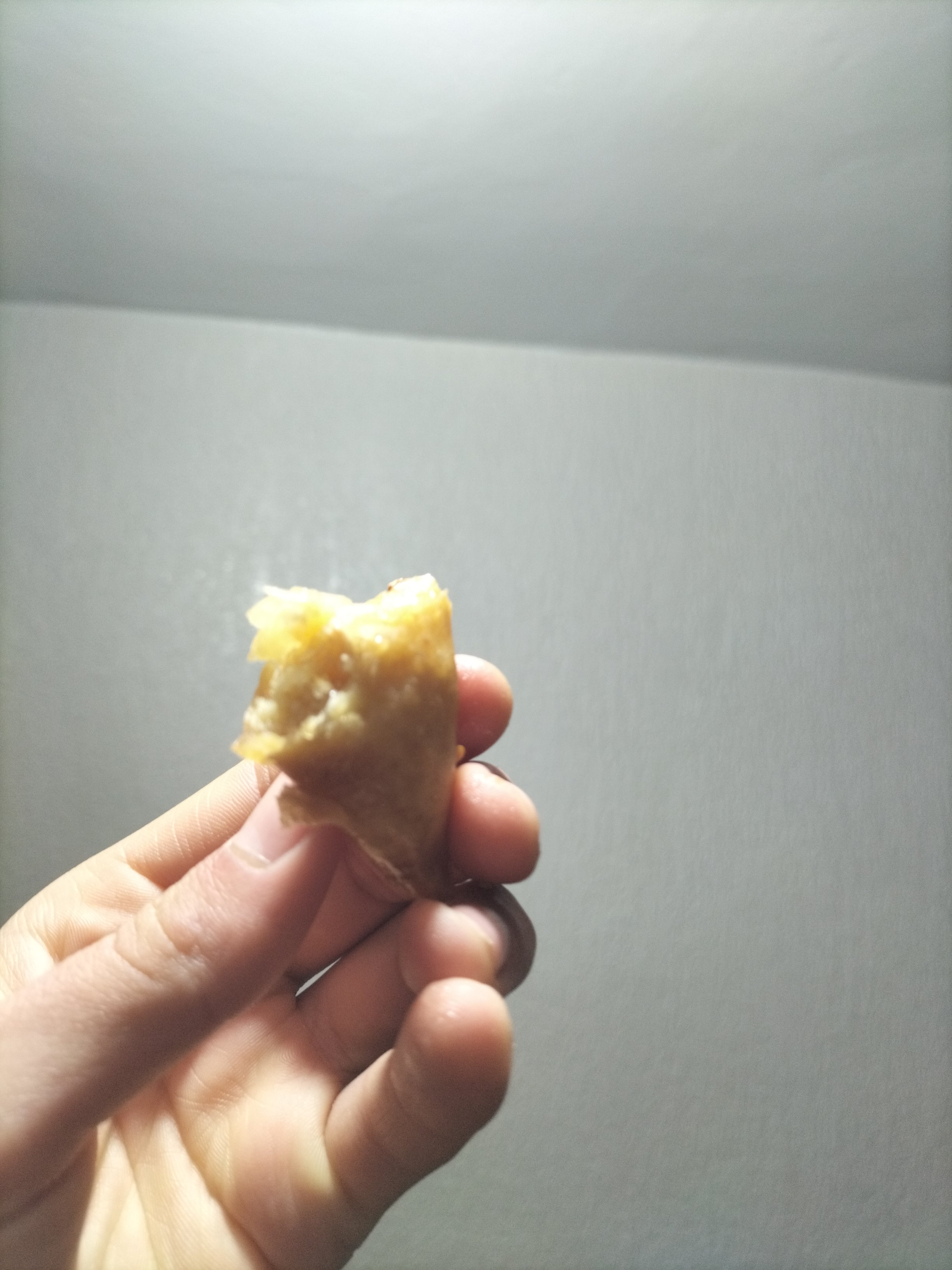
Sweet almond-filled briwa

Sweet briwat are a common delicacy in the Holy month of Ramadan for Moroccans. Unlike its savory counterpart, a sweet briwa usually comes in a comparatively small triangular shape, and it is often considered an appetizer.

Savory briwat are fried or baked and then sprinkled with herbs, spices and sometimes with powdered sugar.

== See also ==
- List of pastries
- List of African dishes
- Maghrebi cuisine
