= Ma'quda =

Maghrebi potato fritter dish

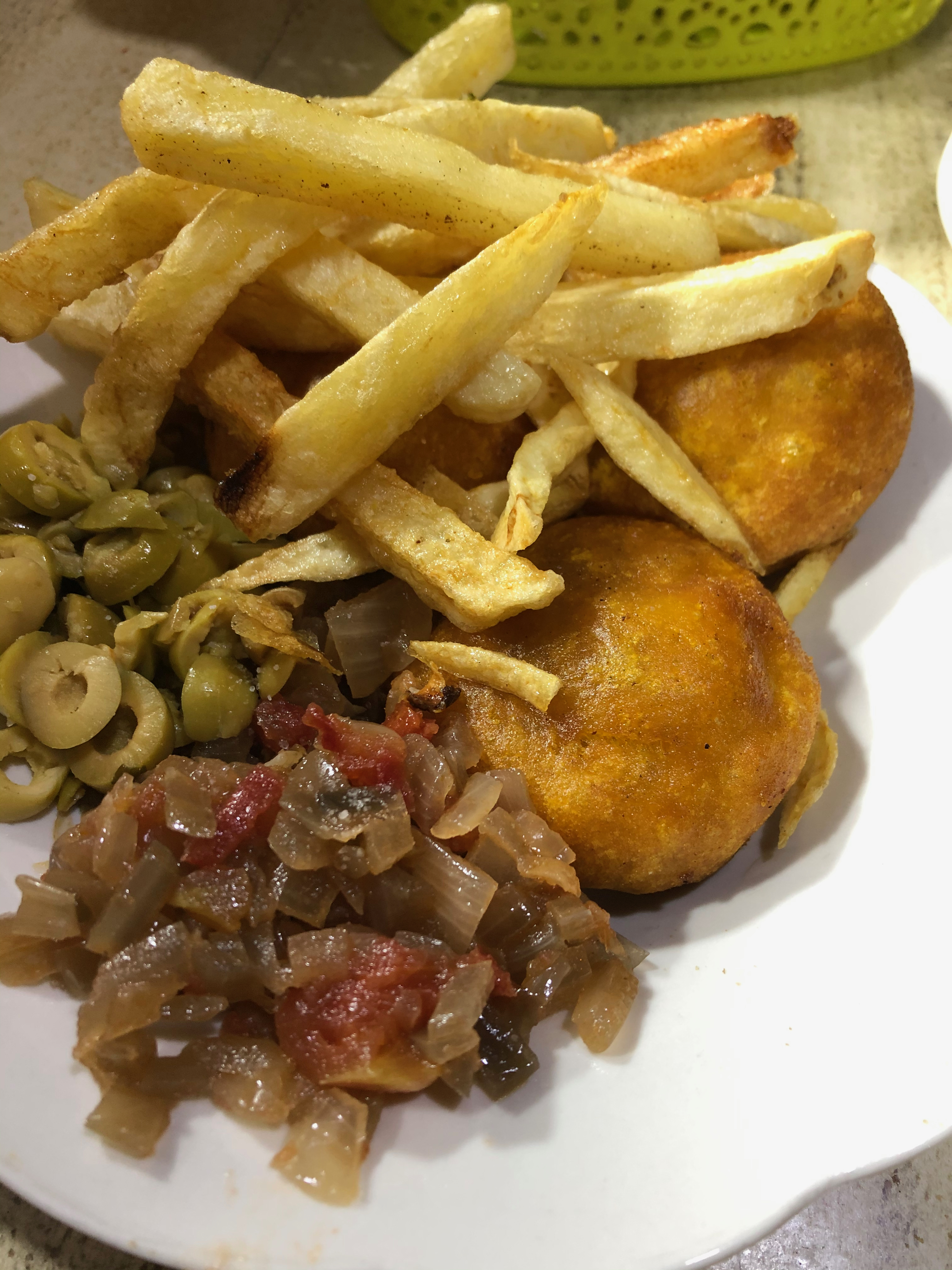
A plate of maʿqūda served with fries, olives, and onions in Fes.

Ma'qūda (Arabic: معقودة, lit. 'knotted') is a Maghrebi fritter made of a potato-based batter. In addition to puréed potato, the batter can contain garlic, salt, hot pepper, egg, and cheese.

In Algeria, the fritter is popular across the northern part of the country where it is sold as a sandwich in fast food restaurants, usually with harissa. Ma'qūda is also called khbizat ma'dnos (Arabic: خبيزات المعدنوس, lit. 'small parsley breads') in the east, while in the west, it is sometimes stuffed with cheese or ground meat and eaten with harira (a thick Maghrebi meat-and-chickpea soup).

It is a cheap food enjoyed by students and others of modest means in cities such as Fes.

In Morocco, maakouda is commonly sold at street stalls, especially in the form of a sandwich, served inside Moroccan bread and often accompanied by harissa. It is a typical low-cost food, widely consumed by students and workers.

During the month of Ramadan, it is commonly included in the evening meals that break the daily fast.
