= Fatéma Hal =

Moroccan chef (born 1952)

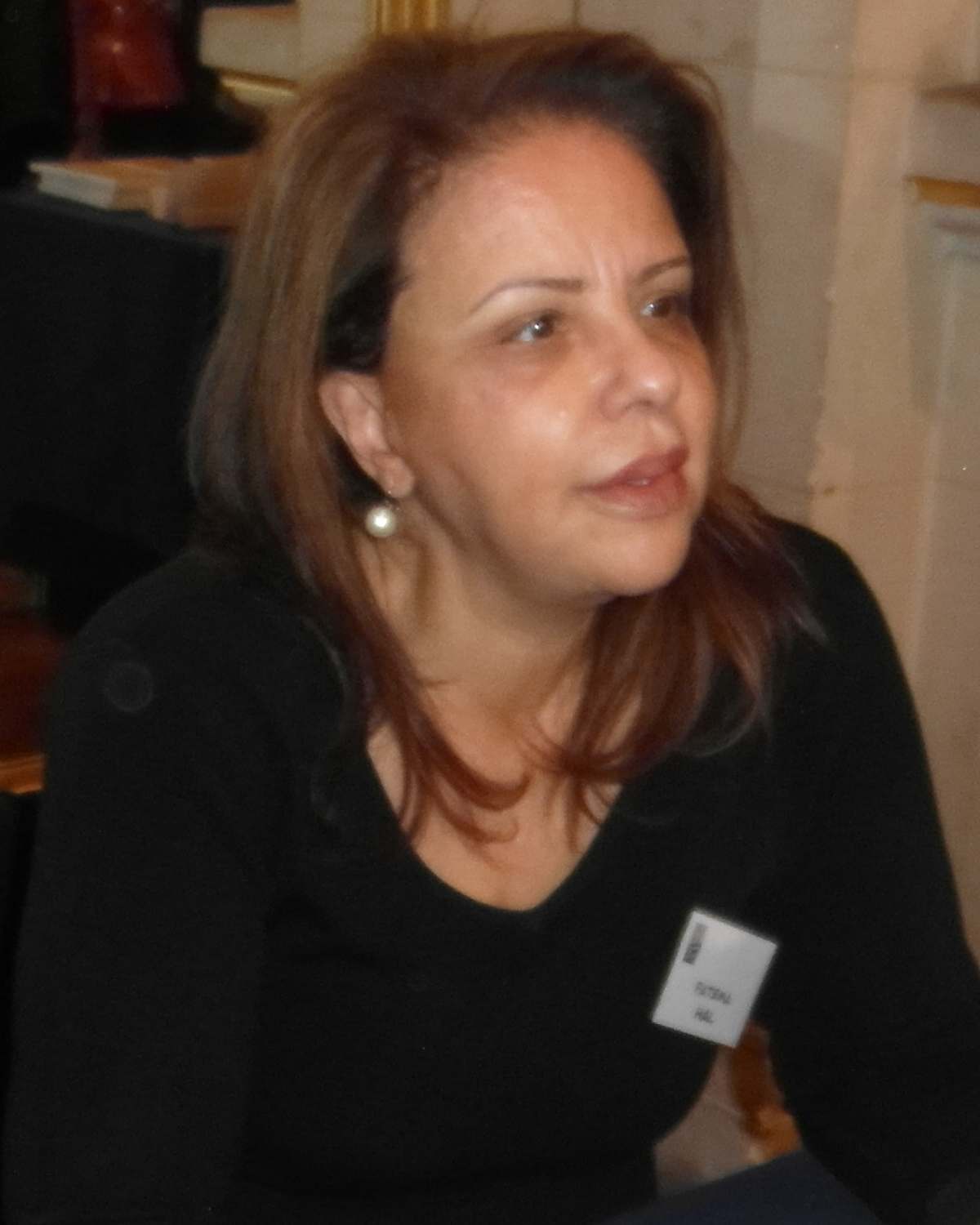
Fatéma Hal in February 2015

Fatéma Hal (Arabic: فاطمة هال, romanized: Fāṭimah Hāl; born 5 February 1952) is a Moroccan chef and writer. She is the owner of the prestigious restaurant Mansouria in Paris.

== Early life ==
Hal was born on 5 February 1952 in Oujda, Morocco. She received her secondary education in Oujda. She emigrated to France in 1970 at the age of 18 and married her cousin in Paris in a marriage arranged by her family, and with whom she had three children. They lived in Garges-lès-Gonesse. Hal earned a degree in Arabic literature from Paris 8 University and graduated in anthropology from the École pratique des hautes études in 1979 where she investigated the relation between prostitution and female poverty.

After her divorce, she devoted herself to defending women's rights. In fact, she worked as an Arab-French interpreter for women at hospitals in North Africa. She also worked toward promoting culture and teaching Arabic in the suburbs, collaborating with community organizations. After developing a national program for women, she was called by the French Minister of Women, Yvette Roudy, to serve as a technical advisor to the Ministry in 1982.

== Career ==
She opened her first Moroccan restaurant in 1984 (or 1985) in 11th arrondissement of Paris and named it Mansouria named after her mother and which Hal was able to finance through tontine. Among its guests is French president François Mitterrand and other politicians and celebrities.

After opening the restaurant, Hal spent ten years traveling around Morocco collecting recipes from old women and documenting them, as many of them had been passed down orally, and she was also able to recover some that had been lost.

La Mansouria is also the headquarters of the association founded by Hal, where vulnerable young women are trained in cooking.

In the 2010s, Hal also ran the kitchens of the Moroccan gourmet restaurant Le Cour des Lions located on the top floor of the Es Saadi Palace in Marrakesh.

According to Le Figaro, Hal has become "one of the most renowned ambassadors of Moroccan cuisine".

== Honors ==
- Legion of Honour (France)
- Order of National Merit (Morocco)

== Books ==
- Les Saveurs et les gestes
- Le Grand Livre de la cuisine marocaine
- Le Livre du couscous
- Ramadan, la cuisine du partage
- Les Douceurs du Ramadan
- Tajines et couscous
- Authentic Recipes from Morocco
- The Food of Morocco: Authentic Recipes from the North African Coast
- Le discours amoureux des épices
