= Couscous =

Traditional Maghrebi dish

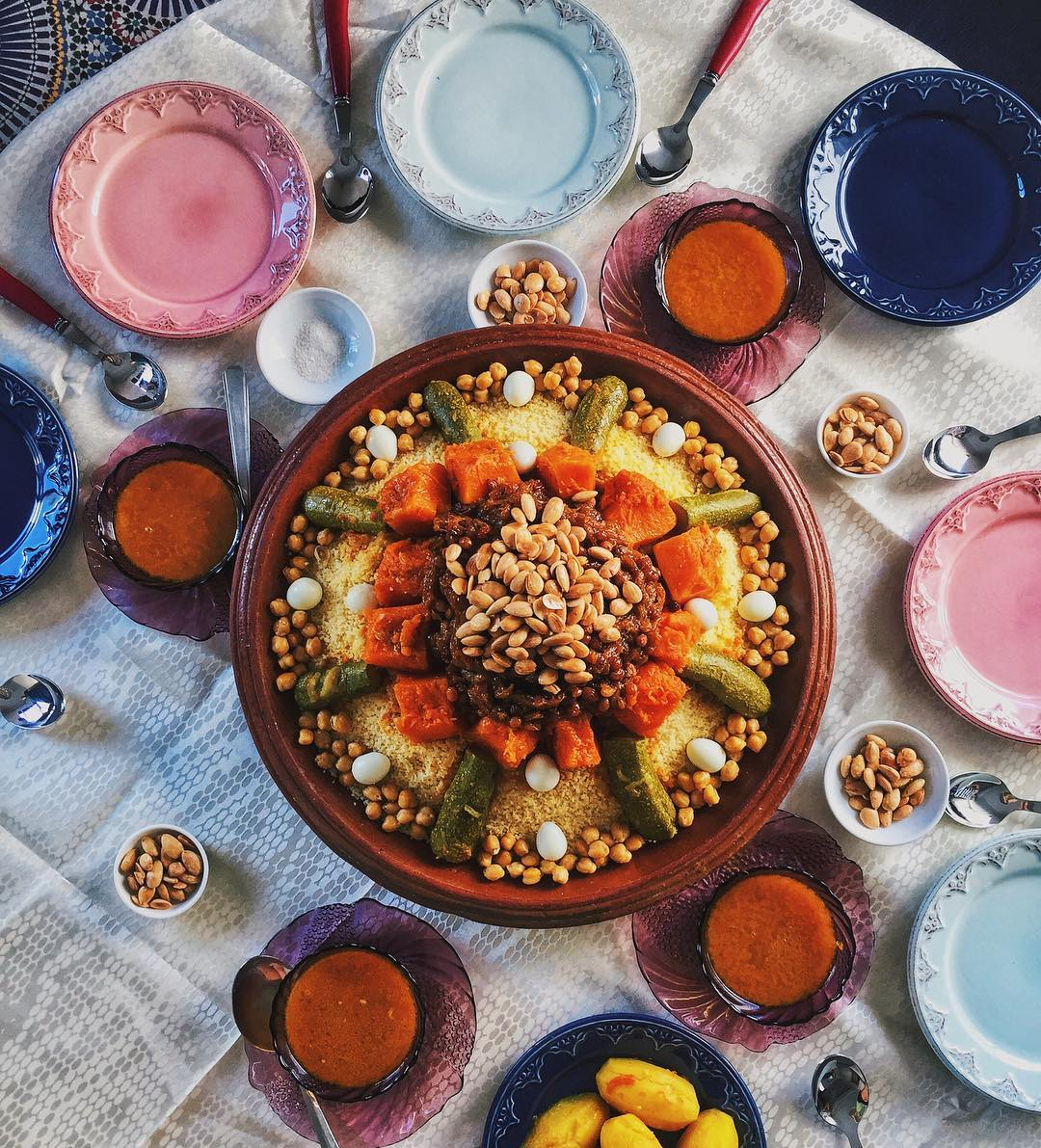
- Couscous served with vegetables, chickpeas, partridge eggs and tfaya (a confection made of caramelized onions, raisins, and spices)
- Alternative names: Kesksou, seksu, ta'ām, kosksi, aberbuc, uccu,Barbosha
- Course: Main course, side dish or dessert
- Place of origin: Maghreb
- Main ingredients: Semolina
- Variations: Moghrabieh, maftoul
- Food energy (per 1/4 cup (~60 mL), dry serving): 150 kcal (630 kJ)
Nutritional value
(per 1/4 cup (~60 mL), dry serving)
- Protein: 5 g
- Fat: 0 g
- Carbohydrate: 30 g

Couscous (Note: Arabic: كُسْكُس kuskus; Tamazight: ⵙⴽⵙⵓ seksu or ⴽⵙⴽⵙⵓ keskesu; Kabyle: ⵙⵉⴽⵙⵓ seksu; Tachawit: ⴰⴱⴻⵔⴱⵓⵛ aberbuc; Tumzabt: ⵓⵛⵛⵓ; uccu) is a traditional North African dish of small (Note: Usually about 2 mm (1/16 in) in diameter, though a finer (1 mm) and larger varieties (3 mm or more) also exist in North Africa.) steamed granules of rolled semolina that is often served with a stew spooned on top. Pearl millet, sorghum, bulgur, and other cereals are often cooked in much the same way in West Africa, and the resulting dishes are also sometimes called couscous.

Couscous is a staple food throughout the Maghrebi cuisines of Algeria, Tunisia, Mauritania, Morocco, and Libya. It was integrated into French and European cuisine at the beginning of the twentieth century, through the French colonial empire and the Pieds-Noirs of Algeria.

In 2020, couscous was added to UNESCO's Intangible Cultural Heritage list.

== Etymology ==
The word "couscous" (alternately cuscus or kuskus) was first noted in early 17th century French, from Arabic kuskus, from kaskasa 'to pound', and is probably of Berber origin. The term seksu is attested in various Berber varieties such as Kabyle and Riffian, while Saharan Berber varieties such as Touareg and Ghadames have a slightly different form, keskesu. This widespread geographical dispersion of the term strongly suggests its local Berber origin, lending further support to its likely Berber roots as Algerian linguist Salem Chaker suggests.

The Berber root *KS means "well formed, well rolled, rounded." Numerous names and pronunciations for couscous exist around the world.

According to María Teresa Santamaría Hernández, the Arabic name kuskūs, first recorded in the 13th century in Al-Andalus, can be better explained from Latin adjective *coscosus. The Latin noun coscus had an ancient Mediterranean origin, and referred to small rounded or curved objects, and hence to small animals such as worms, ants, termites and woodworms. This word coscus and its variant cossus appear in Latin veterinary treatises and in glossaries, and might have been very common in North Africa, and perhaps also in southern Spain. Therefore, *coscosus meant ‘full of worms’, also in a metaphorical sense referring to this dish of granules or rolled semolina. In medieval Spanish, the word cozcucho, from Andalusi Arabic, is recorded in the 13th century, and alcuzcuzu, alcuzcuçu, cuzcuz and other variants referred since the first half of the 15th century to this dish considered typical of Moors and Moriscos. This same dish was also called formigos, hormigos and hormiguillos (‘resembling ants’) from the 15th century onwards in a metaphorical sense, since the original meaning of cuzcuz had not been lost.

== History ==
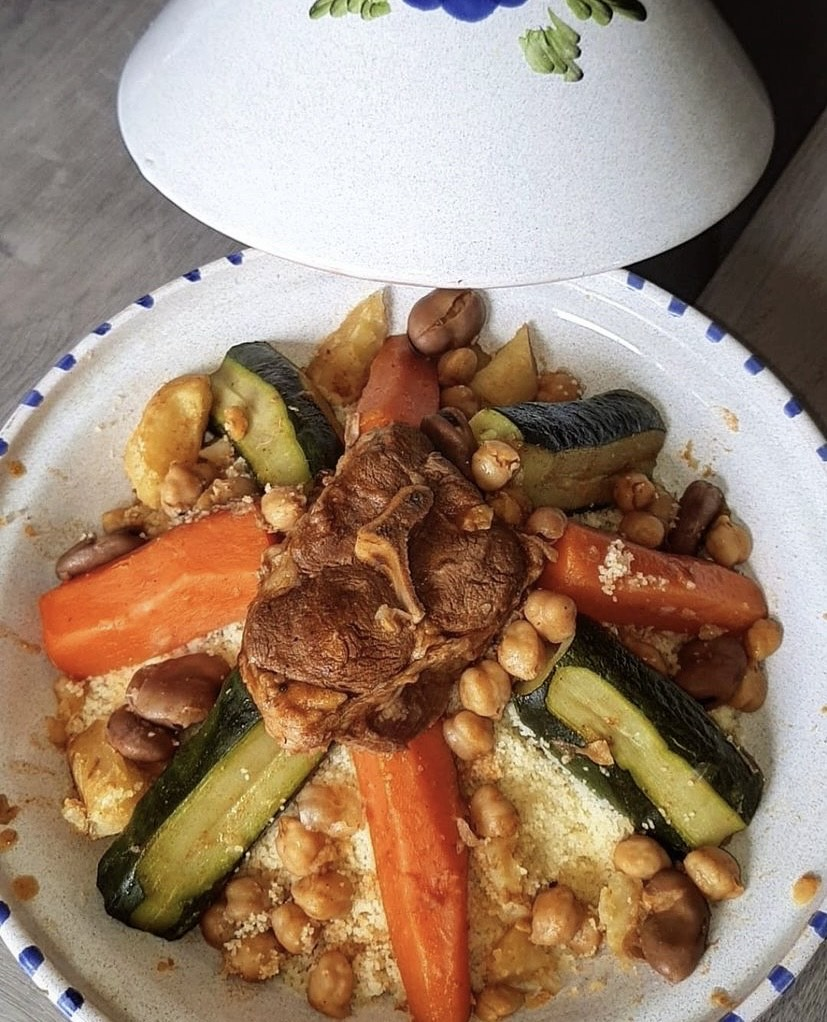
Algerian couscous from Kabylia

It is unclear when couscous originated. Objects that may be couscoussiers have been found at Tichitt culture sites in southern Mauritania dated to 700-400 BCE, where millet was grown and perhaps made into couscous. Food historian Lucie Bolens believes couscous originated millennia ago, during the reign of Masinissa in the ancient kingdom of Numidia in present-day Algeria. Traces of cooking vessels akin to couscoussiers have been found in graves from the 3rd century BC, from the time of the Berber kings of Numidia, in Kabylia, Algeria. Cooking utensils that closely resemble couscoussiers dating back to the 9th century were found in Tiaret, Algeria. Couscoussiers dating back to the 12th century were found in the ruins of Igiliz, located in the Sous valley of Morocco.

According to food writer Charles Perry, couscous originated among the Berbers of Algeria and Morocco between the end of the 11th-century Zirid dynasty, modern-day Algeria, and the rise of the 13th-century Almohad Caliphate. The historian Hady Idris noted that couscous is attested to during the Hafsid dynasty, but not the Zirid dynasty. Historian Marianne Brisville stated that couscous could be recognised in the 11th century under the word taam, the oldest mention is in Ouargla, Algeria.

In the 12th century, Maghrebi cooks were preparing dishes of non-mushy grains by stirring flour with water to create light, round balls of couscous dough that could be steamed.

The historian Maxime Rodinson found three recipes for couscous from the 13th century Arabic cookbook Kitab al-Wusla ila al-Habib, written by an Ayyubid author, and the anonymous Arabic cooking book Kitab al tabikh and Ibn Razin al-Tujibi's Fadalat al-khiwan also contain recipes. Ibn Battuta described a couscous made from fonio in the Niger river valley in the 14th century. Millet couscous was one of the main staple foods of Senegambia until at least the 19th century.

Couscous is believed to have been spread among the inhabitants of the Iberian Peninsula by the Berber dynasties of the 13th century, though it is no longer found in traditional Spanish or Portuguese cuisine. In modern-day Trapani, Sicily, the dish is still made to the medieval recipe of Andalusian author Ibn Razin al-Tujibi. Ligurian families that moved from Tabarka to Sardinia brought the dish with them to Carloforte in the 18th century.

The earliest mention of couscous in French dates to the 16th century, but it was only brought into French cuisine at the beginning of the 20th century via the French colonial empire and the Pieds-Noirs.

== Preparation ==
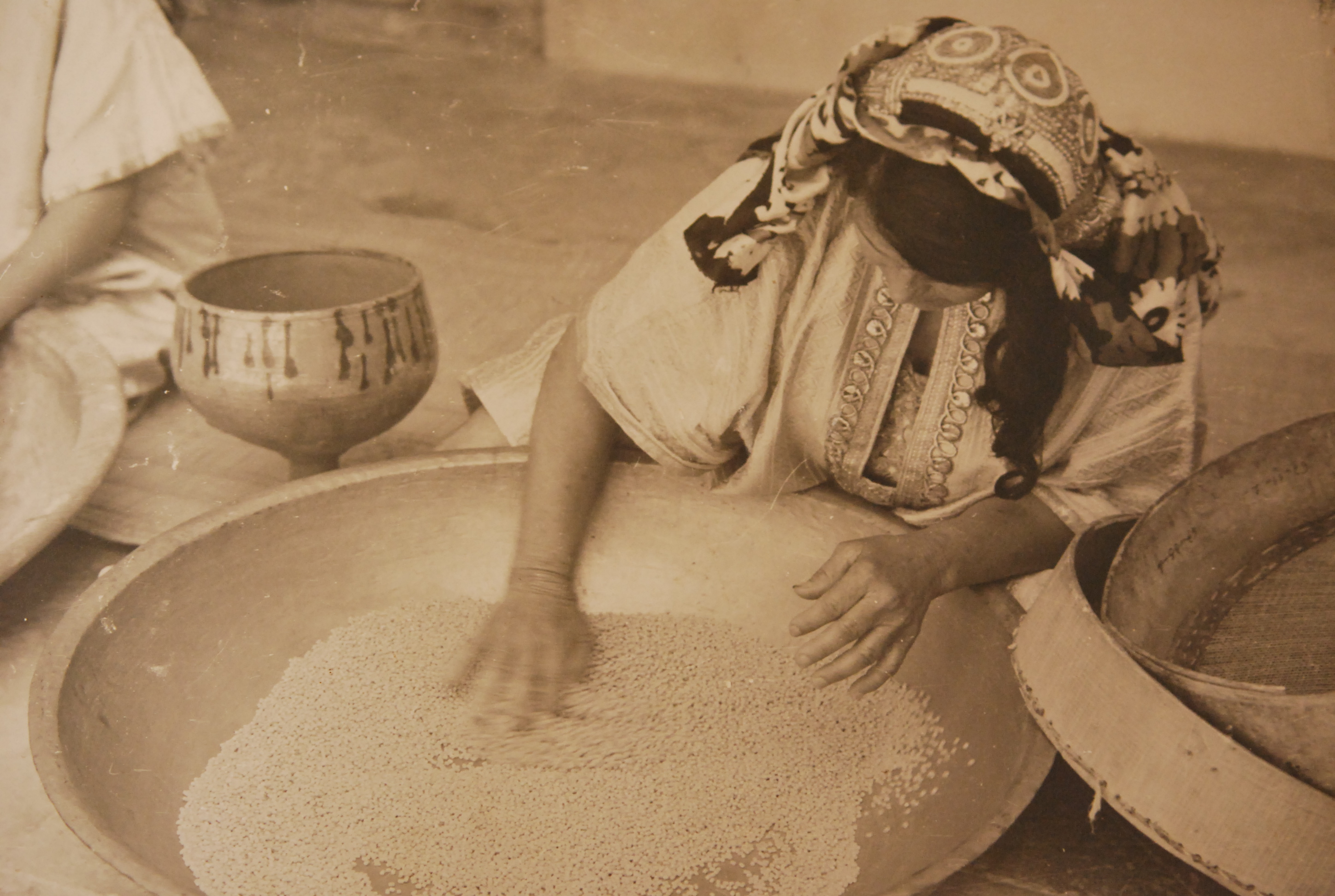
Woman preparing couscous from semolina

Couscous is traditionally made from semolina, the hardest part of the grain of durum wheat (the hardest of all forms of wheat), which resists the grinding of the millstone. The semolina is sprinkled with water and rolled with the hands to form small pellets, sprinkled with dry flour to keep them separate, and then sieved. Any pellets that are too small to be finished granules of couscous fall through the sieve and are again rolled and sprinkled with dry semolina and rolled into pellets. This labor-intensive process continues until all the semolina has been formed into tiny couscous granules. In the traditional method of preparing couscous, groups of people come together to make large batches over several days, which are then dried in the sun and used for several months. Handmade couscous may need to be rehydrated as it is prepared; this is achieved by a process of moistening and steaming over stew until the couscous reaches the desired light and fluffy consistency.

In some regions, couscous is made from farina or coarsely ground barley or pearl millet.

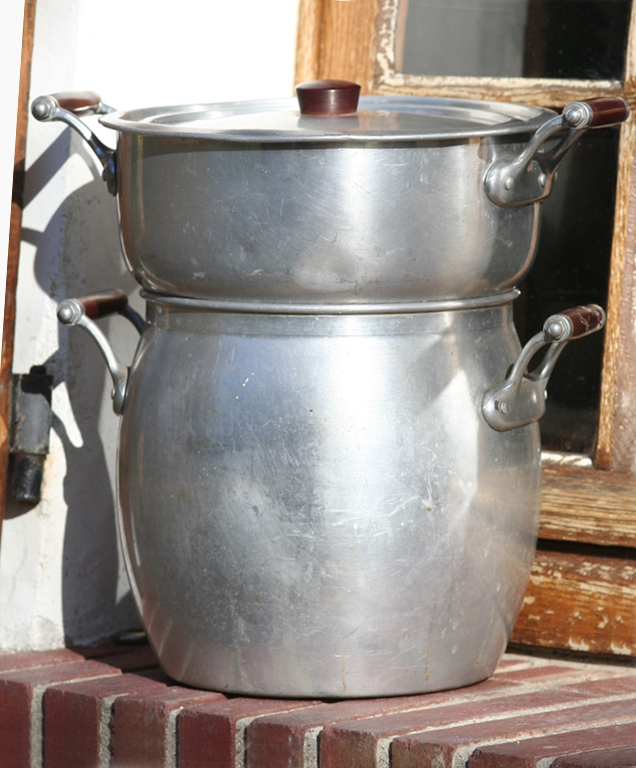
A kiskas (French: couscoussier), a traditional steamer for couscous

In modern times, couscous production is largely mechanized, and the product is sold worldwide. This couscous can be sauteed before it is cooked in water or another liquid. Properly cooked couscous is light and fluffy, not gummy or gritty.

Traditionally, North Africans use a food steamer (called a taseksut in the Berber language, a كِسْكَاس kiskas in Arabic or a couscoussier in French). The base is a tall metal pot shaped like an oil jar, where the meat and vegetables are cooked as a stew. On top of the base, a steamer sits where the couscous is cooked, absorbing the flavours from the stew. The steamer's lid has holes around its edge so steam can escape. It is also possible to use a pot with a steamer insert. If the holes are too big, the steamer can be lined with damp cheesecloth.

The couscous that is sold in most Western grocery stores is usually pre-steamed and dried. It is typically prepared by adding 1.5 measures of boiling water or stock to each measure of couscous and then leaving it covered tightly for about five minutes. Pre-steamed couscous takes less time to prepare than regular couscous, most dried pasta, or dried grains (such as rice). Packaged sets of quick-preparation couscous and canned vegetables, and generally meat, are routinely sold in European grocery stores and supermarkets. Couscous is widely consumed in France, where it was introduced by Maghreb immigrants and voted the third most popular dish in a 2011 survey.

== Recognition ==
In December 2020, Algeria, Mauritania, Morocco, and Tunisia obtained official recognition for the knowledge, know-how, and practices pertaining to the production and consumption of couscous on the Representative List of the Intangible Cultural Heritage of Humanity by UNESCO. The joint submission by the four countries was hailed as an "example of international cooperation."

== Local variations ==
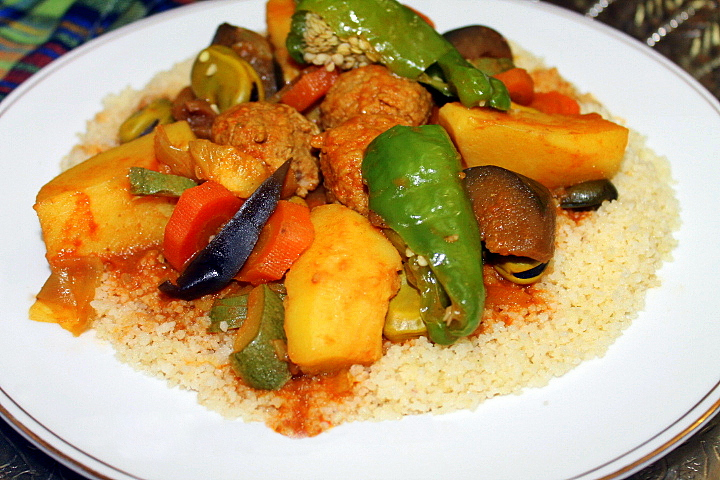
Algerian couscous from Biskra

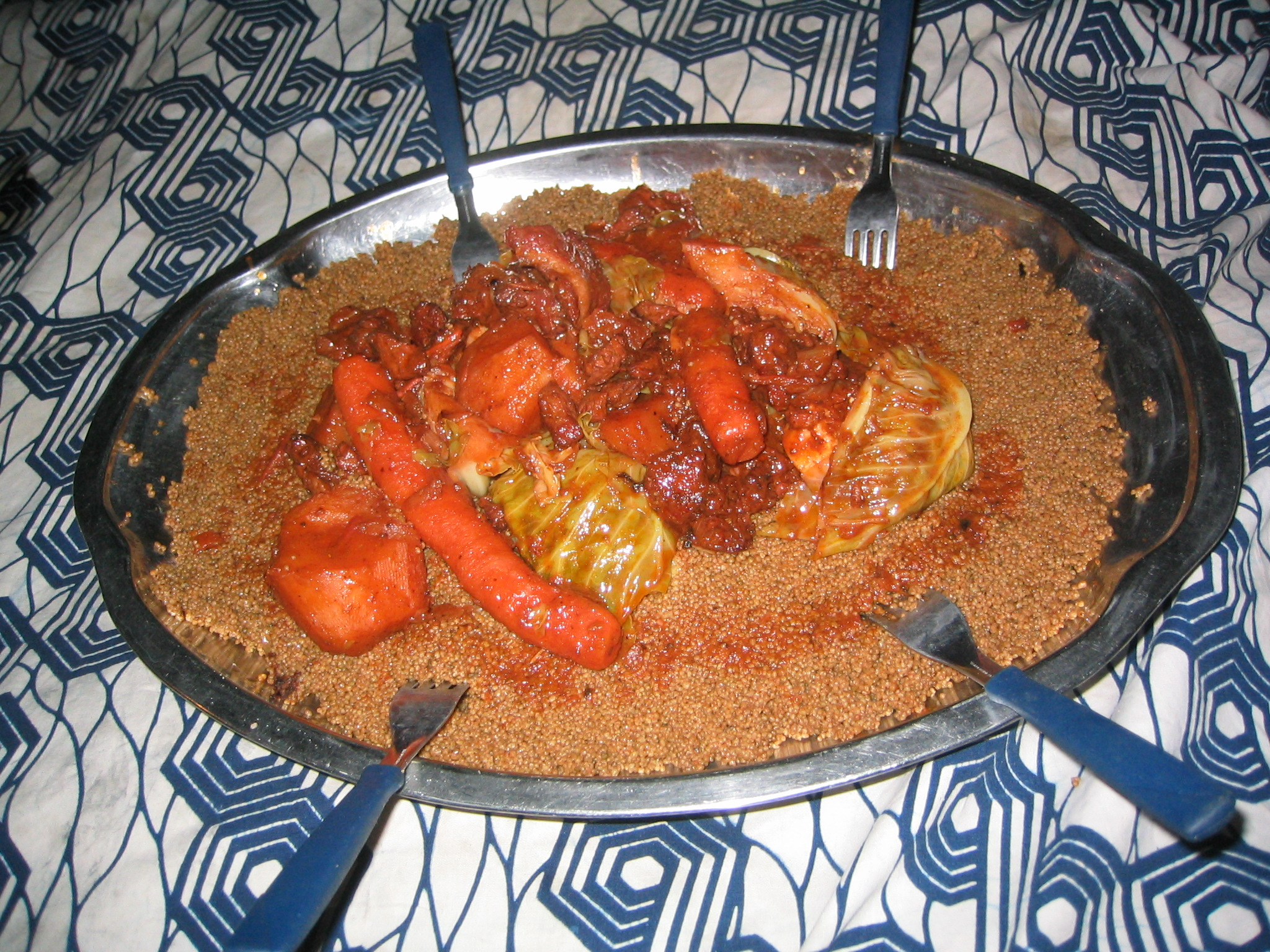
Mauritanian couscous with camel

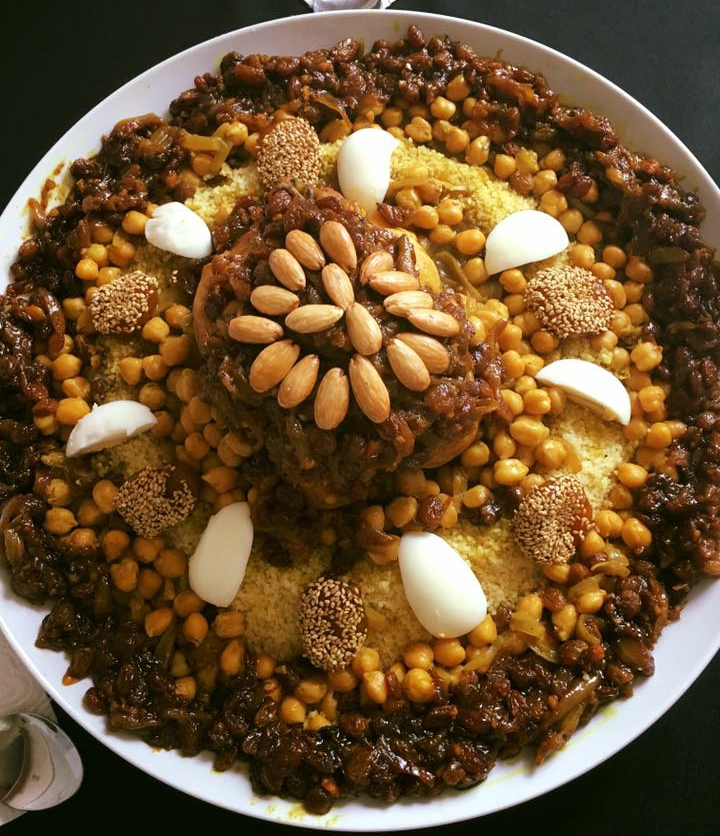
Moroccan couscous with tfaya and roasted chicken

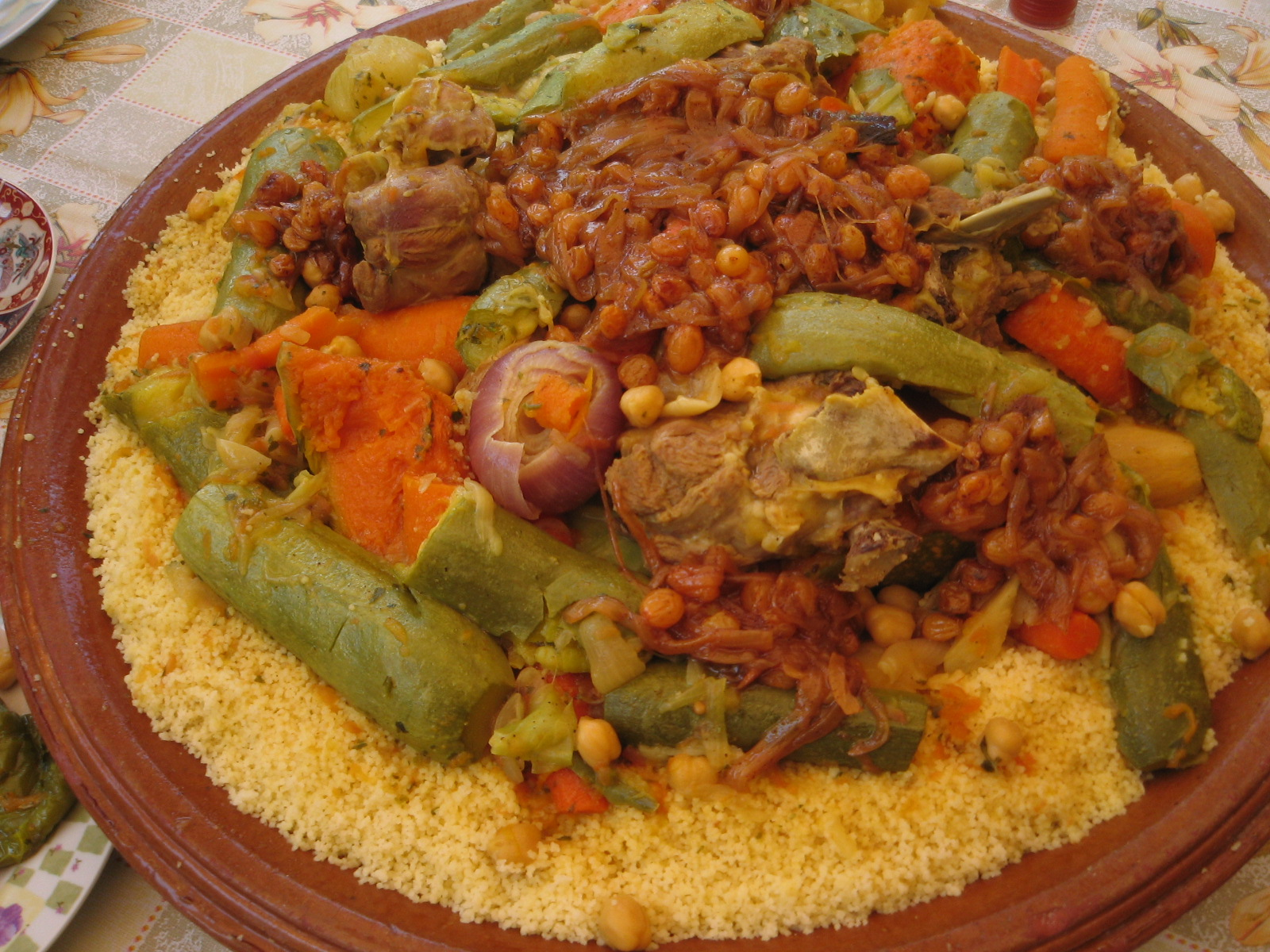
Moroccan Couscous with vegetables, meat, and tfaya

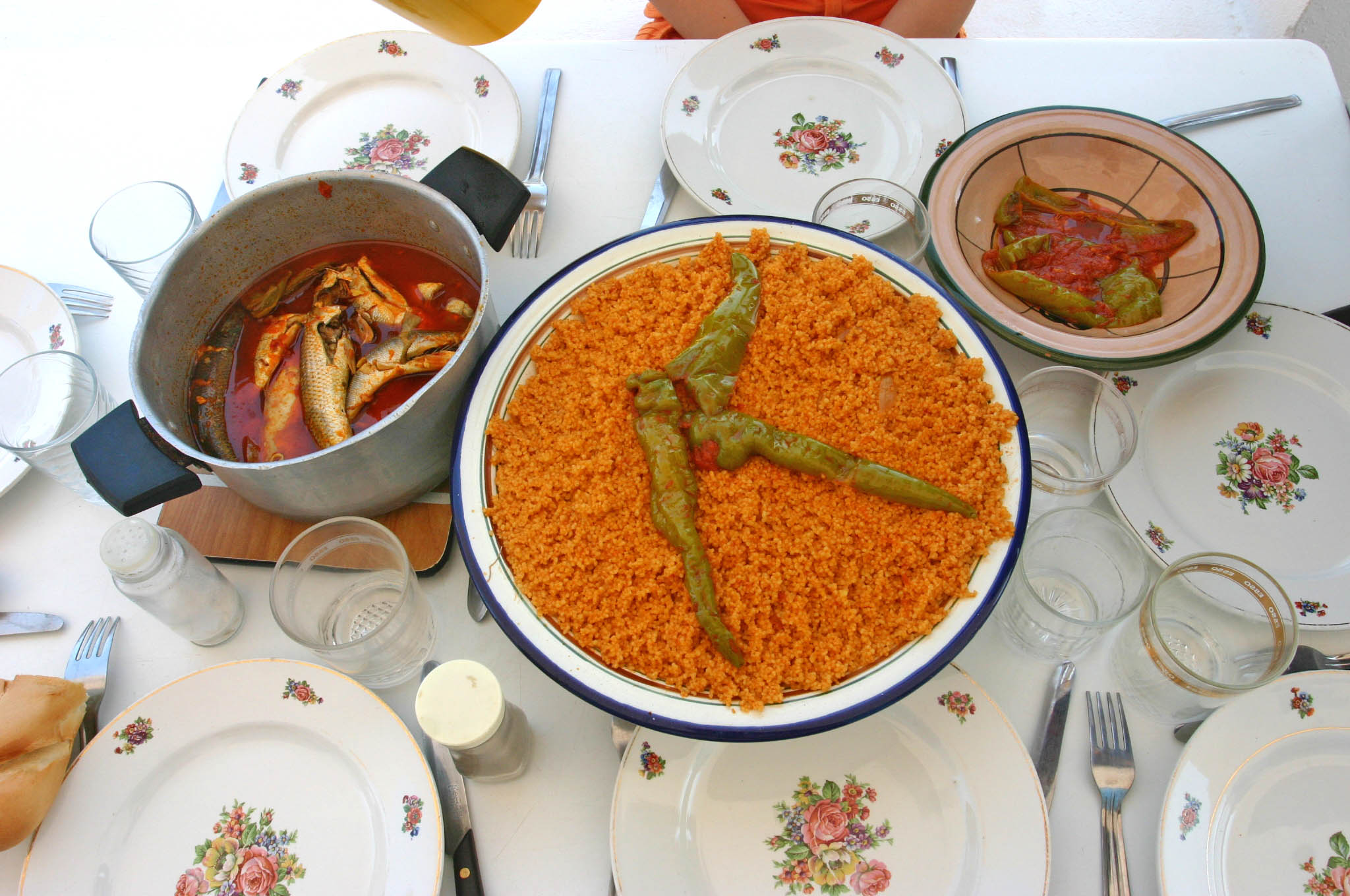
Fish couscous from Tunisia

Couscous proper is about 2 mm in diameter, but there also exists a larger variety (3 mm more) known as berkoukes, as well as an ultra-fine version (around 1 mm). In Morocco, Algeria, Tunisia, and Libya, it is generally served with vegetables (carrots, potatoes, and turnips) cooked in a spicy or mild broth or stew, usually with some meat (generally, chicken, lamb, or mutton).

=== Algeria ===
Algerian couscous is a traditional staple food in Algeria, and it plays an important role in Algerian cuisine. It is commonly served with vegetables, meat, or fish. In Algeria, there are various types of couscous dishes.

=== Egypt ===
In Egypt, couscous (Egyptian Arabic: كسكسي, koskosi) is traditionally prepared and consumed as a sweet dish, differing notably from the savory couscous dishes commonly associated with other North African cuisines. It is typically served for breakfast, as a light evening meal, or as a dessert. The preparation involves steaming or soaking the couscous with melted butter and hot water, after which it is topped with a variety of sweet ingredients. Common toppings include sugar (white, brown, or powdered), cinnamon, grated coconut, raisins, and assorted nuts such as almonds, walnuts, or hazelnuts. In some variations, sweetened condensed milk may also be used.

=== Libya ===
In Libya, couscous is mostly served with lamb (but sometimes camel meat or, rarely, beef) in Tripoli and the western parts of Libya, but not during official ceremonies or weddings. Another way to eat couscous is as a dessert; it is prepared with dates, sesame, and pure honey and is locally referred to as maghrood.

=== Malta ===
In Malta, small round pasta slightly larger than typical couscous is known as kusksu. It is commonly used in a dish of the same name, which includes broad beans (known in Maltese as ful) and ġbejniet, a local type of cheese.

=== Mauritania ===
In Mauritania, the couscous uses large wheat grains (mabroum) and is darker than the yellow couscous of Morocco. It is cooked with lamb, beef, or camel meat together with vegetables, primarily onion, tomato, and carrots, then mixed with a sauce and served with ghee, locally known as dhen.

=== Morocco ===
In Morocco, couscous is a cultural staple traditionally served on Fridays following midday prayers. One of the most iconic preparations is couscous with seven vegetables, which typically features a broth of beef, lamb, or chicken, piled high with a variety of slow-cooked vegetables such as carrots, turnips, pumpkin, zucchini, and cabbage, alongside chickpeas. Another celebrated variation is couscous tfaya, a sweet and savory dish where the steamed semolina and meat are topped with a caramelized garnish of onions, raisins, cinnamon, and toasted almonds. It is often served in a large communal clay platter known as a gsaa.

=== Tunisia ===
In Tunisia, couscous is usually spicy, made with harissa sauce, and served commonly with vegetables and meat, including lamb, fish, seafood, beef, and sometimes (in southern regions) camel. Fish couscous is a Tunisian specialty and can also be made with octopus, squid or other seafood in a hot, red, spicy sauce. Couscous can also be served as a dessert. It is then called masfuf. Masfuf can also contain raisins, grapes, or pomegranate seeds.

=== West Africa ===
In the Sahel, couscous made from pearl millet or sorghum is a very popular, traditional staple food. It is frequently prepared with okra or baobab leaves mixed in to improve digestibility and texture. Couscous can also be mixed with yogurt to create Chakery, a dessert or snack.

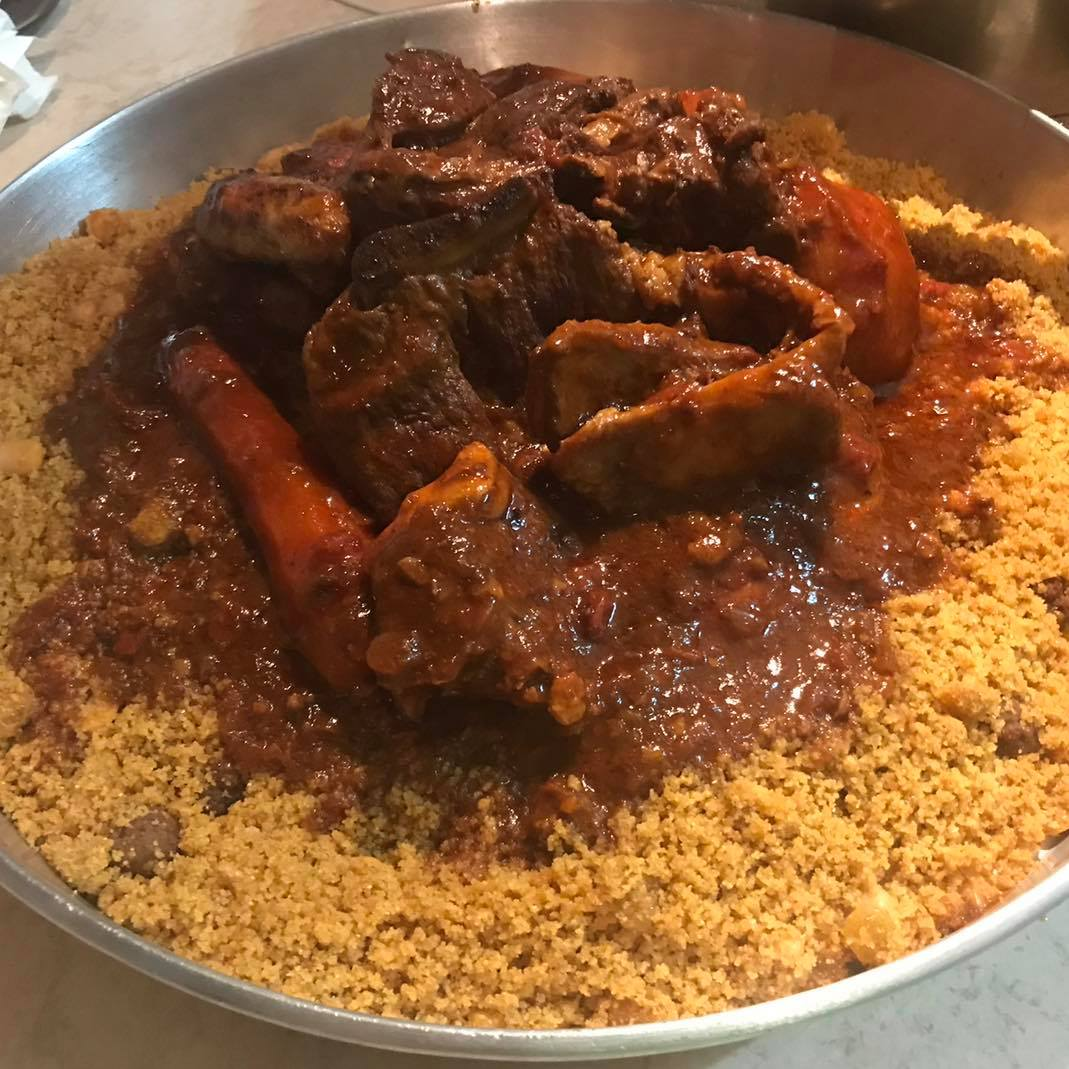
Senegalese couscous (thiere) with lamb

== Similar foods ==
Couscous is made from crushed wheat flour rolled into its constituent granules or pearls, making it distinct from pasta, even pasta such as orzo and risoni of similar size, which is made from ground wheat and either molded or extruded. Couscous and pasta have similar nutritional value, although pasta is usually more refined.

Several dishes worldwide are also made from granules, like those of couscous rolled from flour from grains or other milled or grated starchy crops.

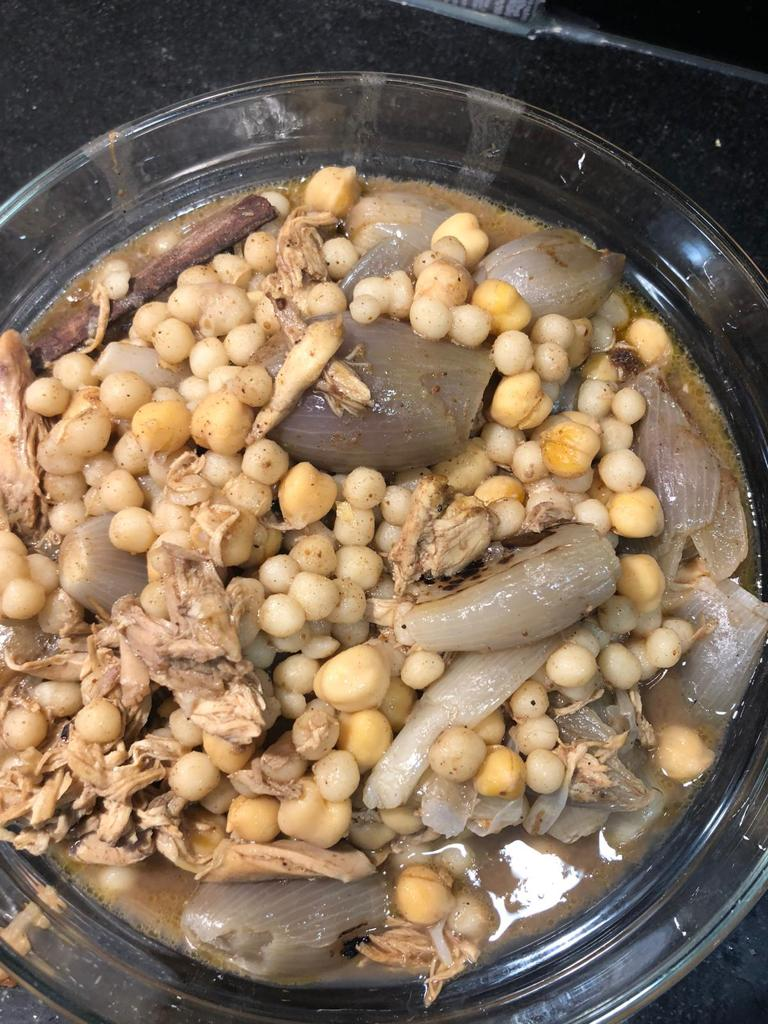
Moghrabieh, in a stew with meat, chickpeas and onions

- Attiéké, a staple food in Côte d'Ivoire and surrounding regions of West Africa, is made from granulated grated cassava.
- Dambou is a couscous-like dish from Niger. It may be made from semolina for special occasions but is often made with rice, millet, or other grain. Moringa leaves are traditionally included in the dish. In France, this Nigerien dish has been adapted as a specific variant (called couscous aux épinards) of the Maghreb-syle couscous commonly found there, often using spinach in place of the moringa.
- Fregula is a type of pasta from Sardinia. It is similar to North African Berkoukes and Middle Eastern Moghrabieh. Fregula comes in varying sizes but typically consists of semolina dough rolled into balls 2–3 mm in diameter and toasted in an oven.
- Kouskousaki (Κουσκουσάκι (in Greek) or kuskus (in Turkish) is a pasta from Greece and Turkey, that is boiled and served with cheese and walnuts.

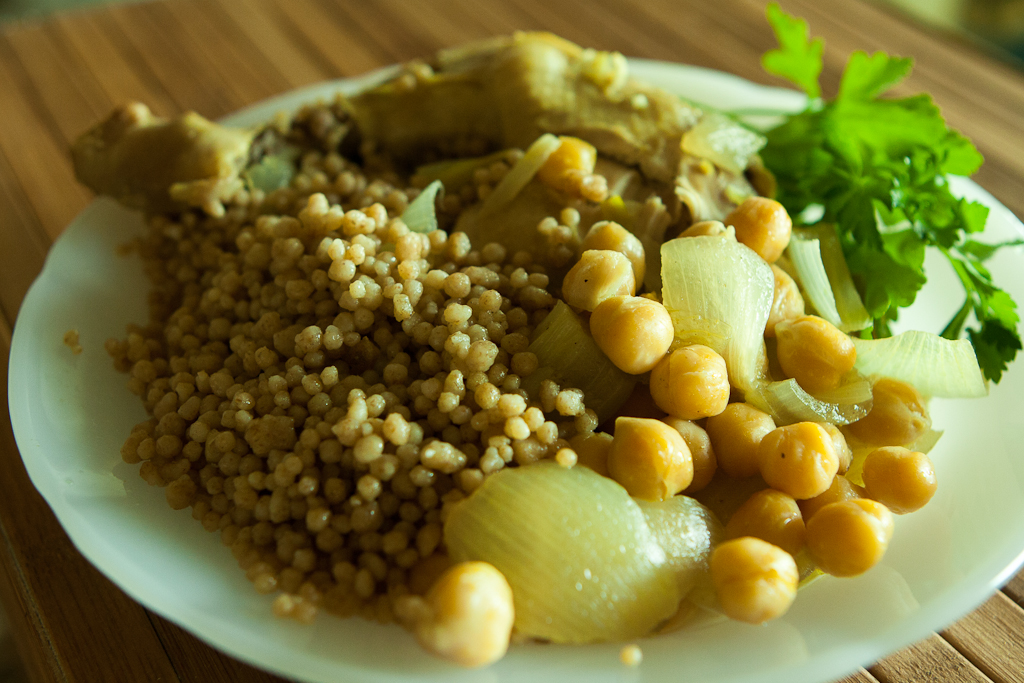
Maftoul, a Palestinian variety of couscous that is made with bulgur.

- Wusu-Wusu is a couscous that is prepared out of fonio in the Hausa region of Nigeria, Benin, Togo and Ghana.

=== Cuscuz ===
Cuscuz (Portuguese pronunciation: [kusˈkus]) is a couscous-like dish from the Northeast Region of Brazil. It is made out of cornmeal and eaten hot with meat and cold with milk. In the state of São Paulo, a speciality known as cuscuz-paulista is made with cornmeal, tomato sauce, tomato pieces, olive oil, boiled egg and other ingredients, such as peas, sweet corn, hearts of palm and sardines. It is also possible to find the dish made with shredded chicken, tuna or shrimp. All the ingredients are cooked in a pan and then placed and left to set in a mould with a hole in the middle. The mould is then inverted onto a serving dish.

=== Moghrabieh ===
In the Levant, the dish known as moghrabieh (Arabic: مغربية, lit. 'Maghrebi', a reference to the Maghreb region) uses the same durum-based semolina flour but rolled into larger (5–6 mm or 3/16–1/4 in in diameter) 'pearls' to create a dish that is commonly served across Jordan, Lebanon and Syria. The pearls are either cooked as part of a stew or flavored with cinnamon and served alongside a chicken and chickpea broth.

=== Maftoul ===
Palestinian maftoul (Arabic: مفتول, also romanized as maftool) uses granules that are larger than the North African variety but smaller than moghrabieh pearls (2–3 mm or 1/16–1/8 in in diameter) and made by hand-rolling bulgur into flour, the bulgur is soaked in water before its rolled. After the pearls are rolled, they are steamed then sun-dried for preservation. Some varieties use fine semolina, white, or whole flour, oil is also commonly added. The hand-rolling makes the grains uneven in shape and size compared to moghrabieh and similar foods. It is similarly served alongside a chicken and chickpea broth. "Maftoul" is an Arabic word derived from the root "fa-ta-la," which means to roll or to twist, describing the hand-rolling method used to make the granules. It is attested as early as 1907, in Elihu Grant's The Peasantry of Palestine.

== Dishes with similar names ==
Israeli couscous is an extruded and toasted pasta and does not share main ingredients or method of production with couscous.

== See also ==
- North African cuisine: Moroccan cuisine, Berber cuisine, Algerian cuisine, Tunisian cuisine, Libyan cuisine and Egyptian cuisine
- List of Middle Eastern dishes
- List of African dishes
