= Tfaya =

Sweet sauce in Moroccan cuisine

- Associated cuisine: Moroccan

Tfaya (Arabic: تفاية) is a sweet sauce in Moroccan cuisine made with caramelized onions, raisins, cinnamon, and honey. It is often served on couscous.

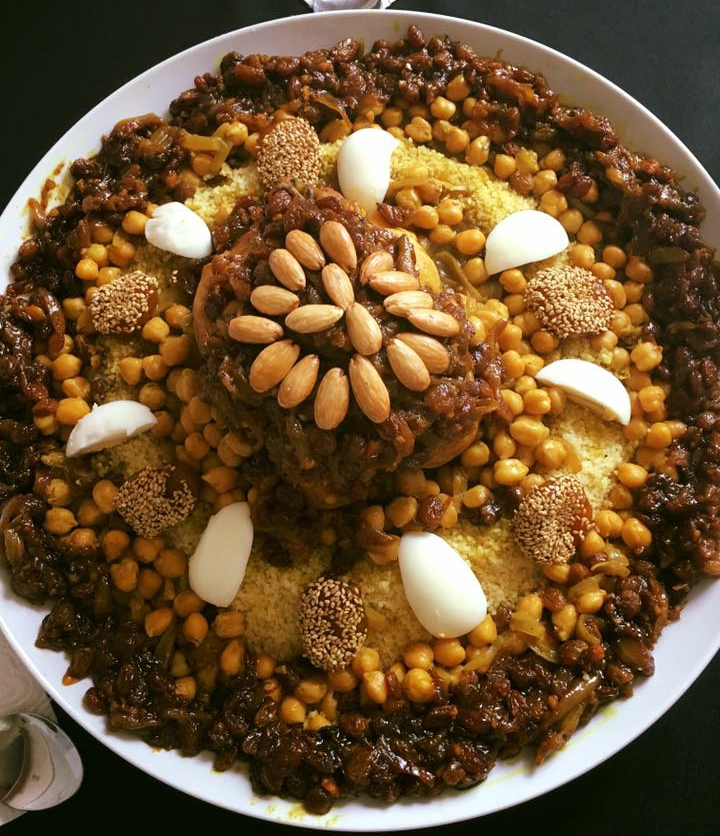
Tfaya on top of Moroccan couscous with roasted chicken.
