= Maghrebi cuisine =

Culinary tradition

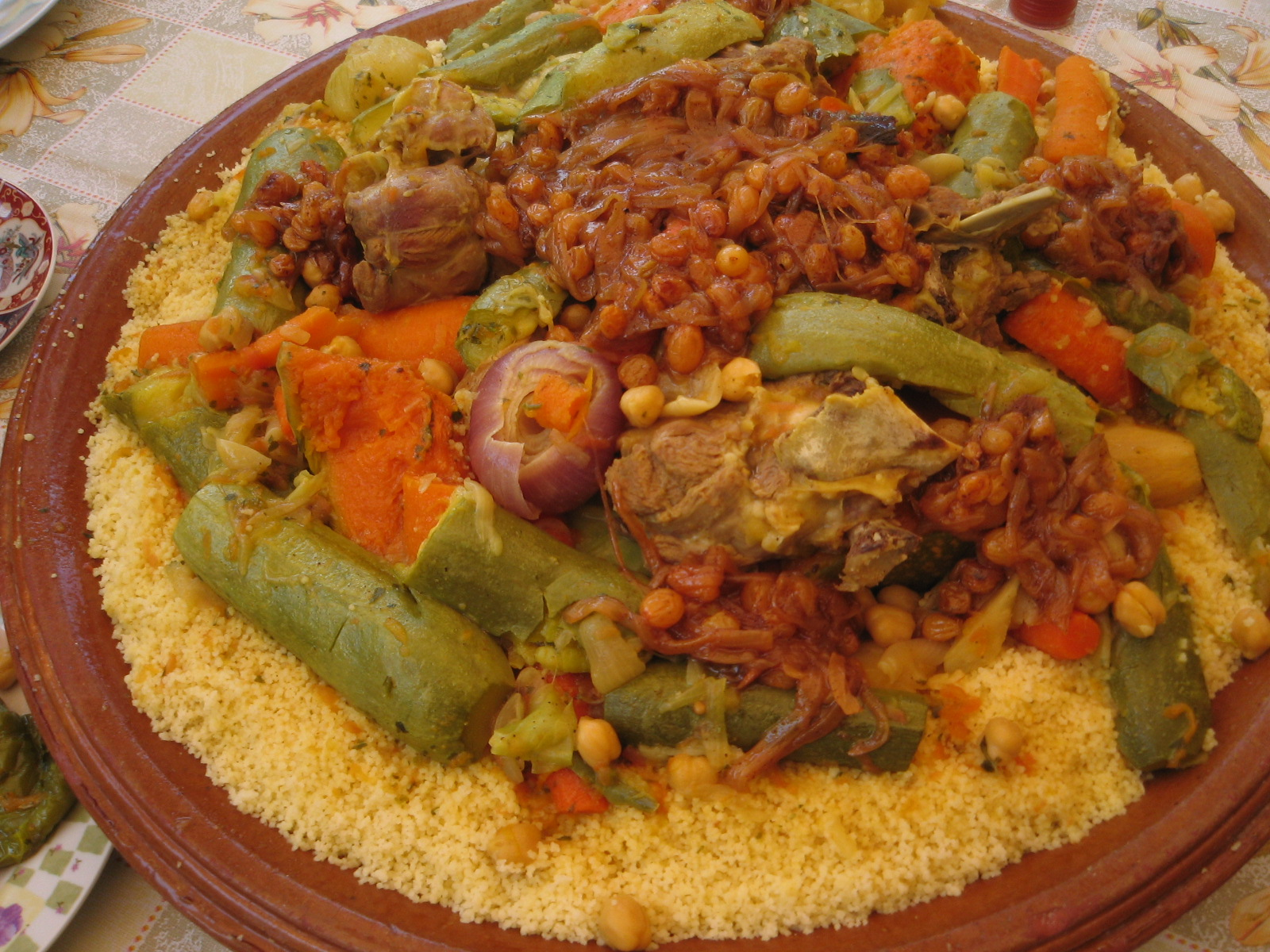
Couscous, here served with vegetables and meat, is one of the most characteristic dishes of the Maghreb

Maghreb cuisine is the cooking of the Maghreb region, the northwesternmost part of Africa along the Mediterranean Sea, consisting of the countries of Algeria, Libya, Mauritania, Morocco and Tunisia. Well-known dishes from the region include couscous, pastilla, tajine and shakshouka.

== Origins ==
The Maghreb

The cuisine of the Maghreb, the western region of North Africa, includes that of Algeria, Morocco, Tunisia and Libya, and is by origin a mixture of Arabian, Berber and Mediterranean cuisines, with historic influences from Ottoman and European cuisines. The cuisines of Algeria, Tunisia and Libya and Morocco have also been influenced by French and Italian cuisine respectively.

== Cuisine ==
In Maghrebi cuisine, the most common staple foods are wheat (for khobz bread and couscous), fish, seafood, goat, lamb, beef, dates, almonds, olives and various vegetables and fruits.

Because the region is predominantly Muslim, halal meats are usually eaten. Most dishes are spiced.

The use of legumes, nuts, fruits and spices is very prominent. Salt-preserved lemons (l'hamd mrakad) and so-called "oil-cured" olives are distinctive elements of the cuisine.

The best-known Maghrebi dish abroad is couscous, made from wheat semolina. The tajine, a cooking vessel made of clay, is also a common denominator in this region, although the dishes and preparation methods vary widely. For example, a tajine in Tunisia is a baked quiche-like dish, whereas in Morocco it is a slow-cooked stew.

=== Spices ===
Spices found in this region's cuisine are ginger, allspice, caraway, saffron, paprika, cloves, cumin, coriander, cayenne pepper and turmeric. Fresh peppermint, parsley, or coriander are also very common. Spice mixtures such as ras el hanout, baharat, and chili pastes like harissa (especially in Tunisia) are frequently used as well.

=== Image gallery ===
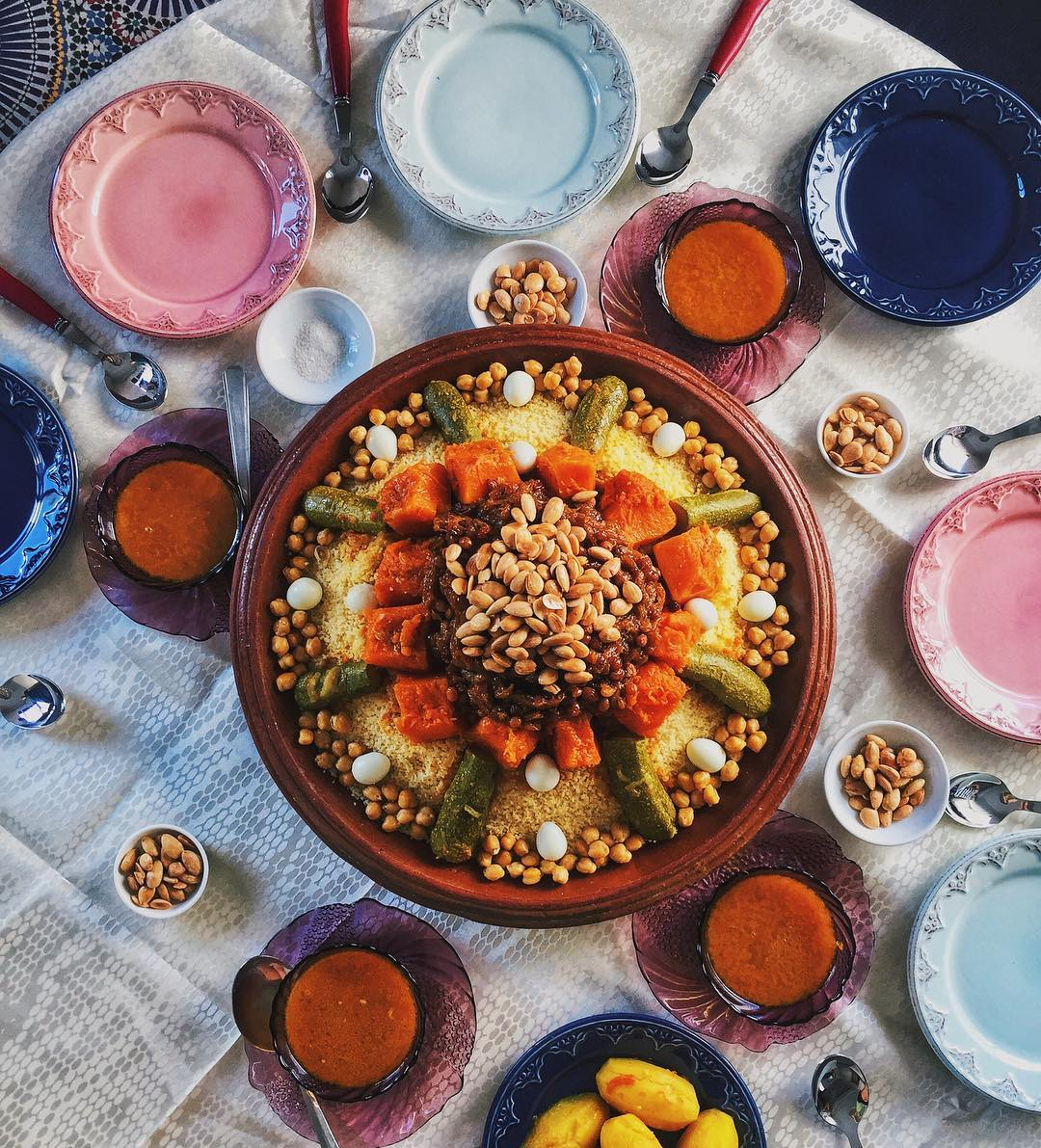
Couscous with vegetables, topped with tfaya and toasted almonds

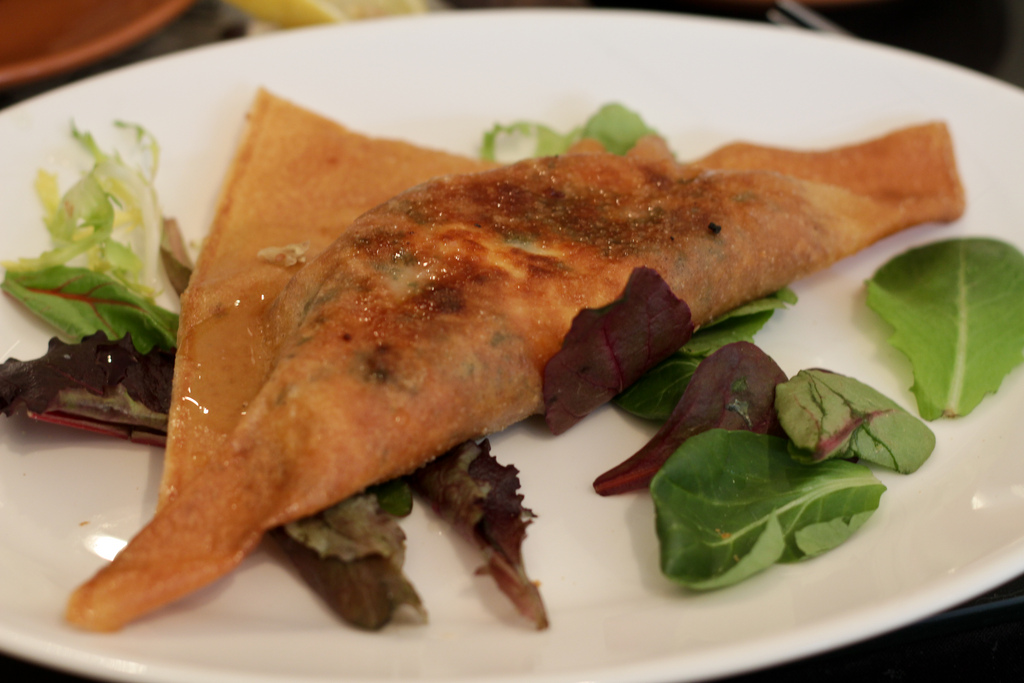
Brik with egg, tuna, onion and parsley

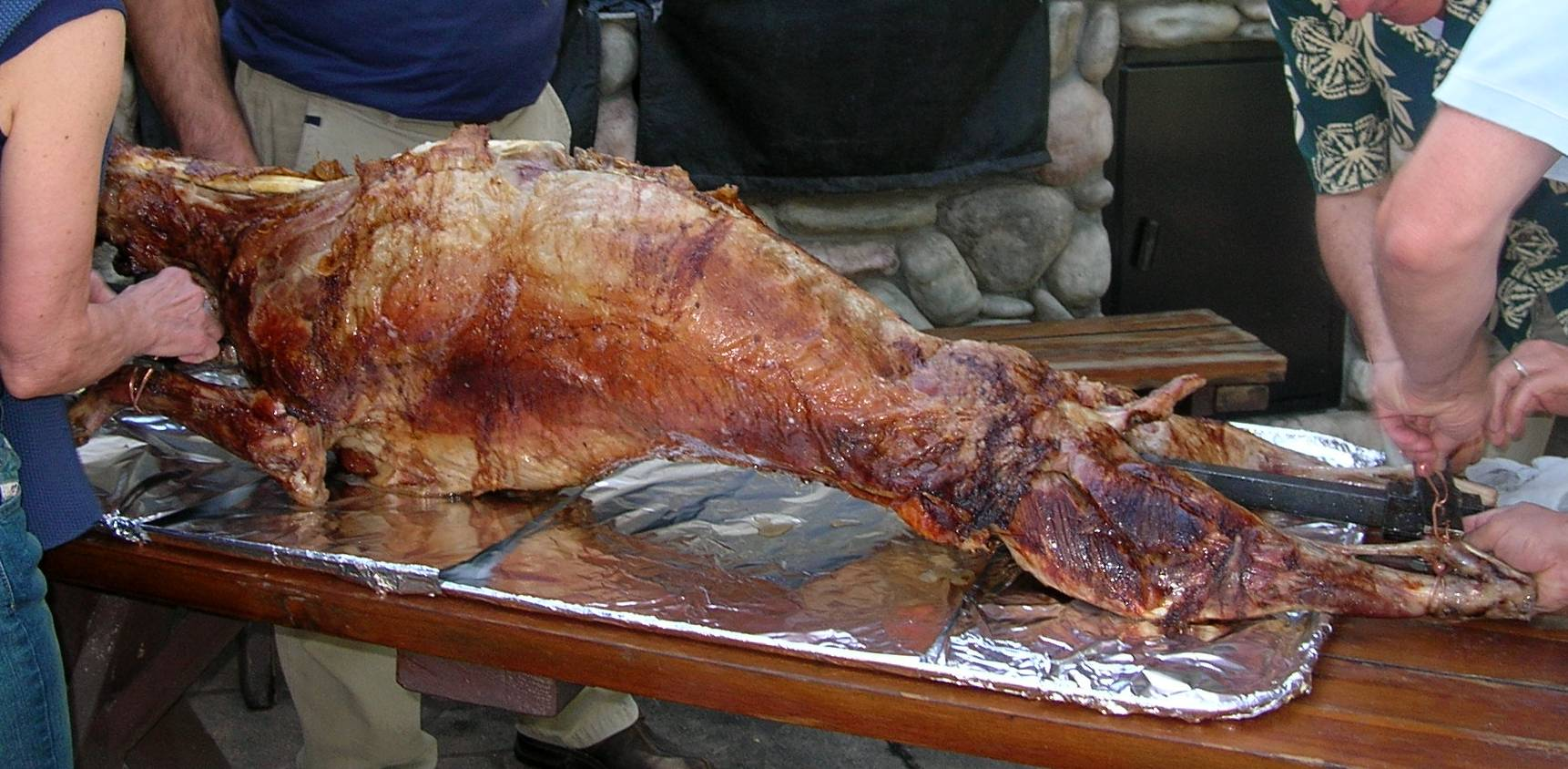
Méchoui, a whole sheep, spit-roasted

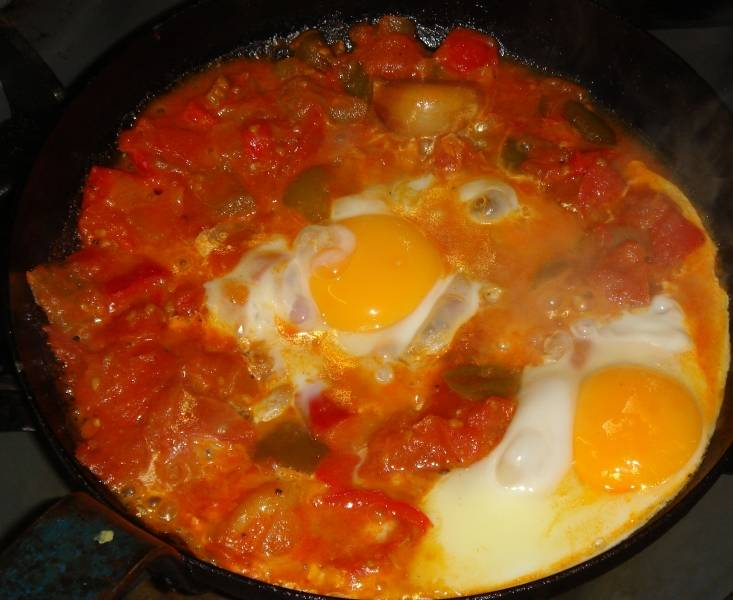
Shakshouka with egg

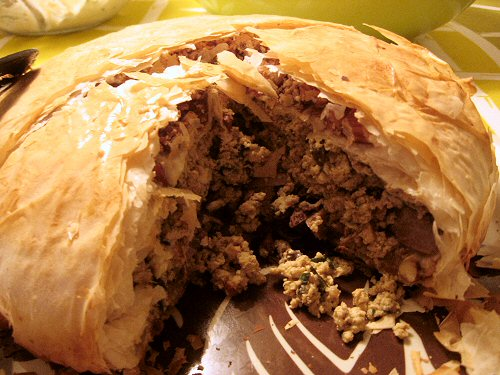
Pastilla with meat

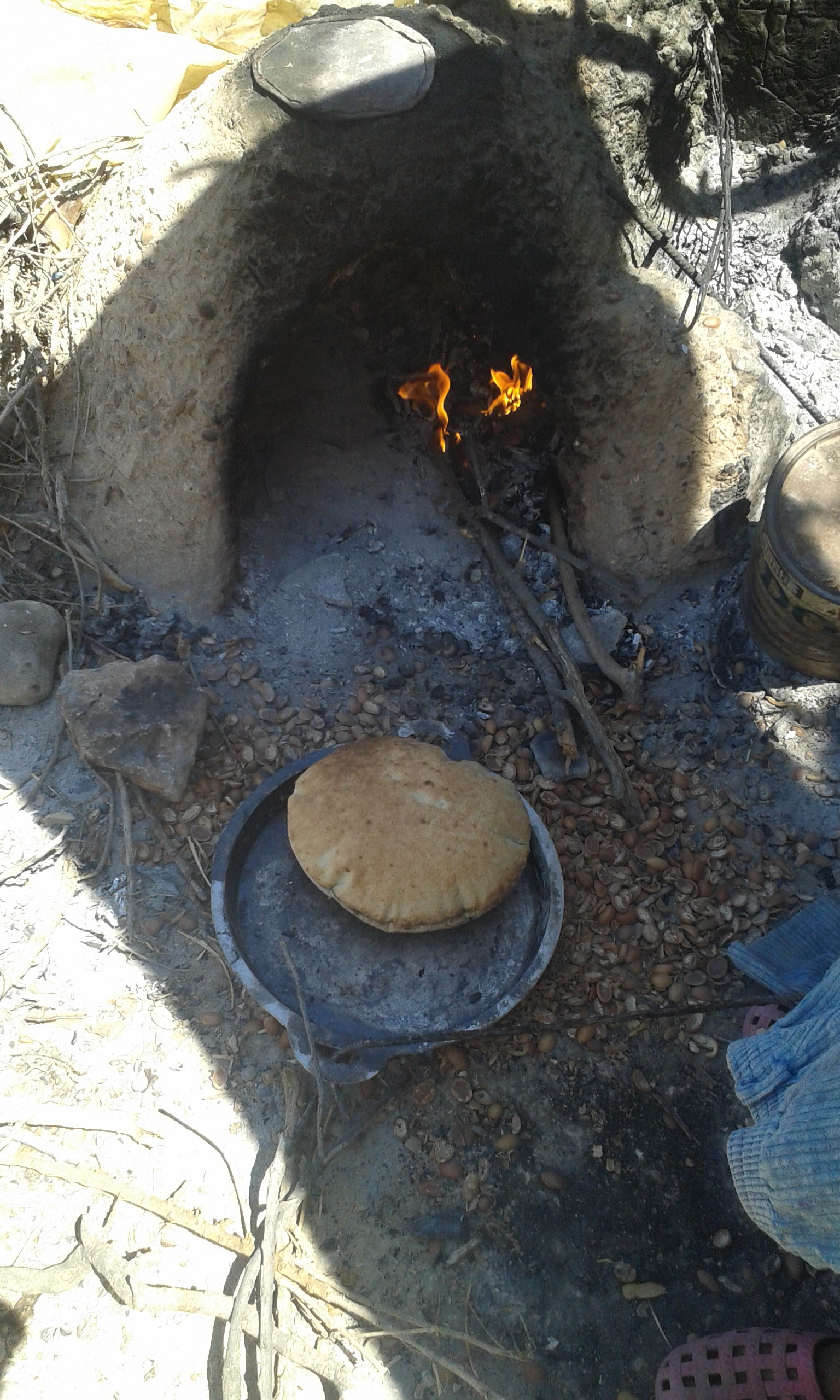
Bread, baked the traditional way

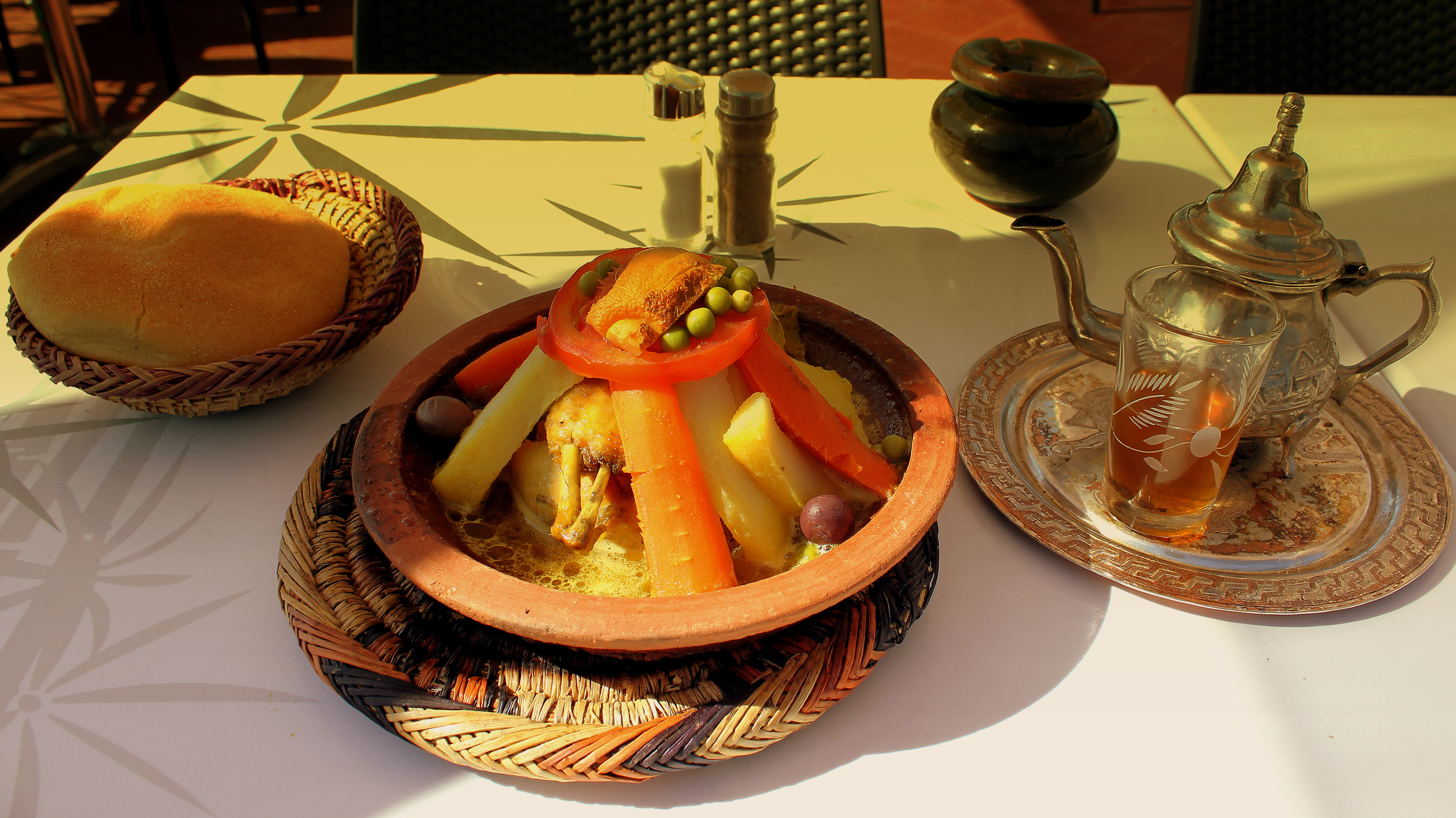
Moroccan tajine with bread and mint tea

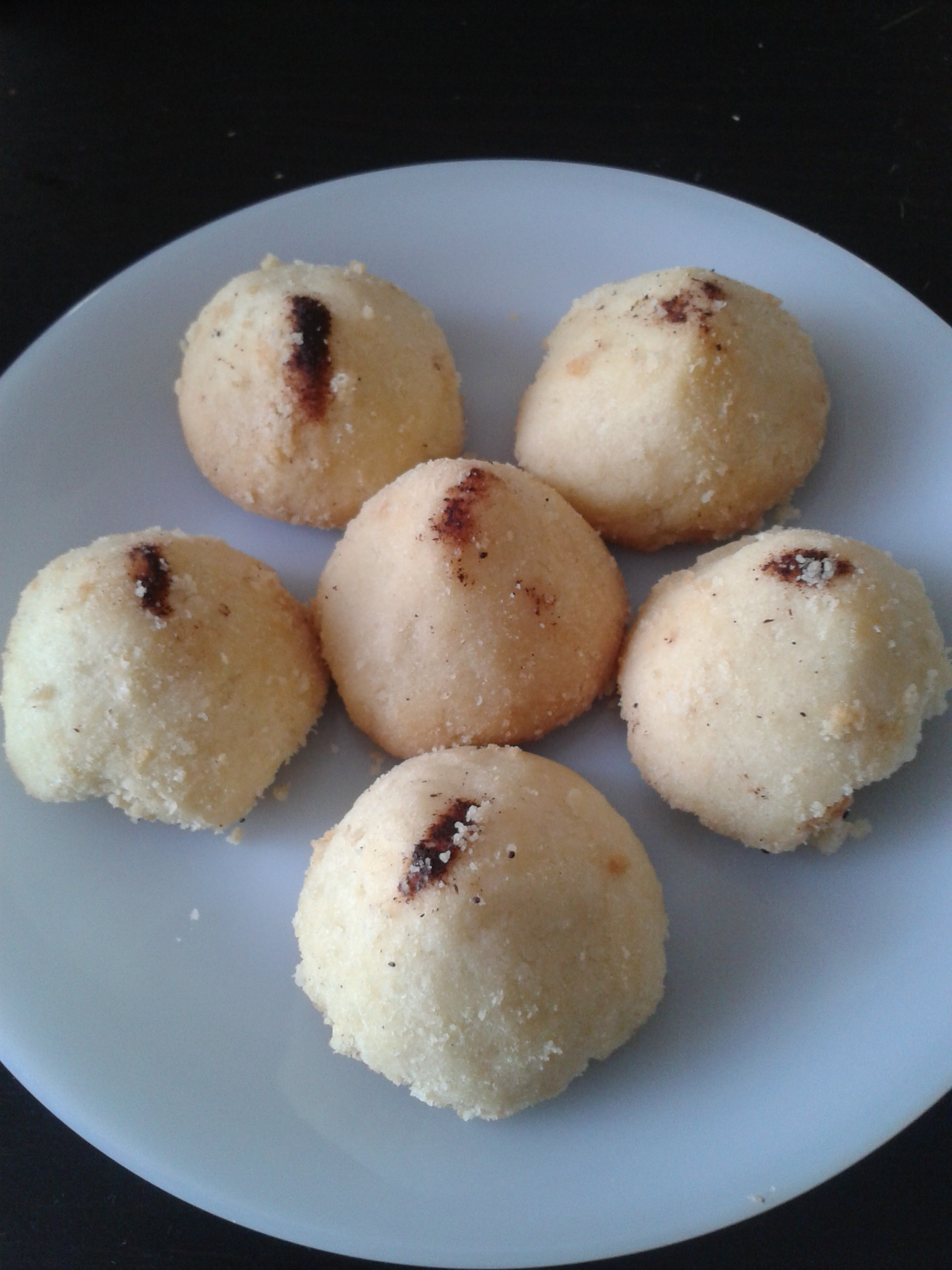
Ghoriba

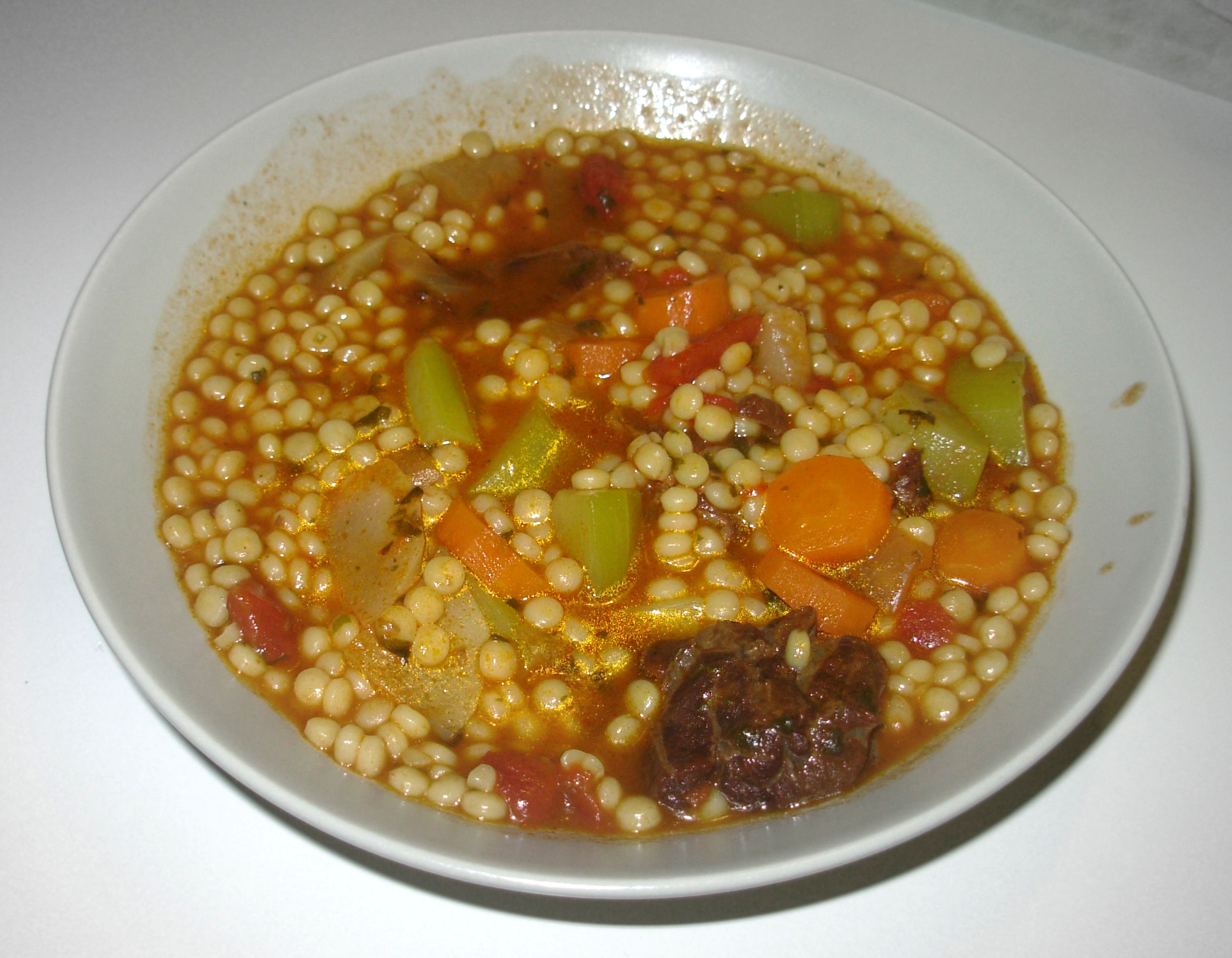
Berkoukes

== See also ==
- List of African cuisines
- List of African dishes
