= Entremet =

Small dish served between courses

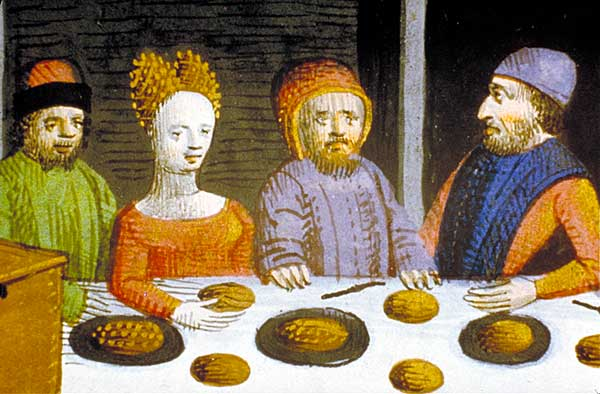
Early entremets usually consisted of nothing more complicated than frumenty, a type of grain porridge, colored with saffron or egg yolk.

An entremet or entremets (/ˈɒntrəmeɪ/; French: [ɑ̃tʁəmɛ]; from Old French, literally meaning "between servings") in Medieval French cuisine referred to dishes served between the courses of the meal, often illusion foods and edible scenic displays. The term additionally referred to performances and entertainments presented between the courses. After the mid-17th century, the term referred to certain types of savory and sweet culinary preparations, and to the stage of the meal in the "Classical Order" of table service when they were served. Since the early 20th century, the term has more commonly referred only to the sweet preparations of the entremets stage of the meal.

In the Late Middle Ages and the early modern period, an entremet marked the end of a course of the meal and could be a culinary preparation like frumenty (a type of wheat porridge) that was brightly colored and flavored with exotic and expensive spices, or elaborate models of castles complete with wine fountains, musicians, and food modeled into allegorical scenes. By the end of the Middle Ages, entremets had also evolved into dinner entertainment in the form of inedible ornaments or acted performances, often full of the symbolism of power and regality. In English, such displays were more commonly known as a subtlety (also sotelty or soteltie); they did not typically include acted entertainment, but did include culinary jokes like live blackbirds flying out of a pie, a scene immortalized in the folk song "Sing a Song of Sixpence".

== Early use of the term ==
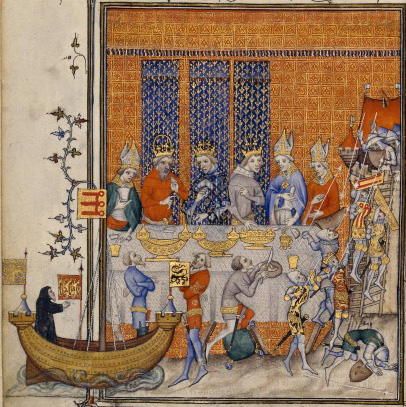
The staging of an elaborate entremet at the banquet of Charles V in 1378; illumination from Grandes Chroniques, late 14th century.

The word entremets, as a culinary term, first appears in line 185 of Lanval, one of the 12th century Lais of Marie de France, and subsequently appears in La Vengeance Raguidel (early 13th century), line 315. The word has no discernible specialized meaning in the texts, but in both, it appears in the context of a meal.

The earliest text to include entremets as culinary preparations is Le Viandier (c. 1300), which has fourteen recipes for entremets, placed in some manuscripts under the heading "entremés". Entremets also appear in Le Ménagier de Paris (1393), Du fait de cuisine (1420), and the Petit traicté auquel verrez la maniere de faire cuisine (c. 1536), more widely known from a later edition titled Livre fort excellent de cuisine (1542). (Note: The Petit traicté was published by Pierre Sargent in Paris between 1534 and 1536. Philip and Mary Hyman have identified 27 editions of the book published between 1536 and 1627, under numerous titles including the Livre fort excellent de cuisine.)

In Du fait de cuisine, entremets are served at dinner at the end of each stage of the meal (or mets, a course of several dishes laid on the table together). In the menus (Note: The word "menus" appropriately describes this section of the Petit traicté, but the first appearance of "menu" with that culinary meaning is in the much later Nouveau Dictionnaire de l’Académie françoise, 1718, p. II:50.) of the Livre fort excellent, only one entremets is mentioned, placed at the end of a "second service of roasts".

== Late-Medieval entremets ==
Entremets were often brightly colored with plant dyes to provide a sort of visual entertainment. Over time, entremets became popular as illusion foods, such as peacocks or swans that were skinned, cooked, and redressed in their original plumage; or scenes depicting human activities, such as a knight in the form of a grilled capon equipped with a paper helmet and lance, sitting on the back of a roast piglet. Elaborate models of castles made from edible material were also popular. At a feast in 1343 dedicated to Pope Clement VI, one of the entremets was a castle with walls made from roast birds, populated with cooked and redressed deer, wild boar, goat, hare, and rabbit.

In the 14th century, entremets began to involve not just eye-catching displays of high-status cuisine, but also more prominent and often highly symbolic forms of inedible entertainment. In 1306, the knighting of the son of Edward I included performances of chansons de geste in what has been assumed to be part of the entremet. Entremets would often take on the character of theatrical displays, complete with props, actors, singers, mummers, and dancers. At a banquet held in 1378 by Charles V of France in honor of Emperor Charles IV, a huge wooden model of the city of Jerusalem was rolled in before the high table. Actors portraying the crusader Godfrey of Bouillon and his knights then sailed into the hall on a miniature ship and reenacted the capture of Jerusalem in 1099.

Entremets made an effective tool for political displays. One of the most famous examples is the so-called Feast of the Pheasant, arranged by Philip the Good of Burgundy in 1454. The theme of the banquet was the fall of Constantinople to the Ottoman Turks in 1453, and included a vow by Philip and his guests to retake the city in a crusade, though this was never realized. There were several spectacular displays at the banquet referred to by contemporary witnesses as entremets. Guests were entertained by a wide range of extravagant displays of automatons in the form of fountains and pies containing musicians. At the end of the banquet, an actor representing the Holy Church rode in on an elephant and read a poem about the plight of Eastern Christianity under Ottoman rule.

From the late 14th century on in England, entremets are referred to as subtleties. This English term was derived from an older meaning of "subtle" as "clever" or "surprising". The meaning of "subtlety" did not include entertainment involving actors; those were referred to as pageants. The "four and twenty blackbirds baked in a pie", in the nursery rhyme "Sing a Song of Sixpence", has its genesis in an entremet presented to amuse banquet guests in the 14th century. This extravaganza of hospitality was related by an Italian cook of the era. “Live birds were slipped into a baked pie shell through a hole cut in its bottom.” The unwary guest would release the flapping birds once the upper crust was cut into.

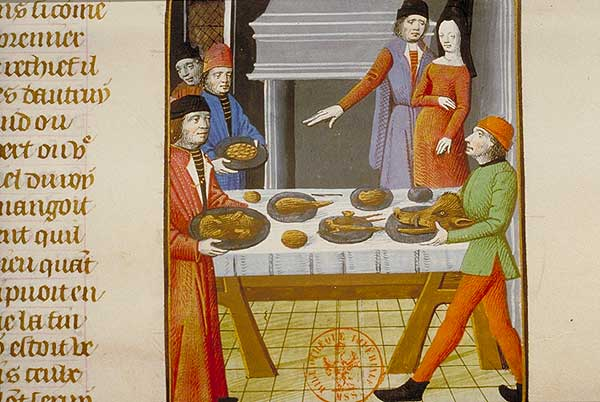
A serving of boar's head, a popular form of entremet. The image of the boar caught with an apple in its mouth was possibly among the first dishes to attempt an imitation of a live animal.

At the end of the Middle Ages, the level of refinement among the noble and royal courts of Europe had increased considerably, and the demands of powerful hosts and their rich dinner guests resulted in ever more complicated and elaborate creations. Chiquart, cook to Amadeus VIII, Duke of Savoy, described an entremet entitled Castle of Love in his 15th-century culinary treatise Du fait de cuisine ("On cookery"). It consisted of a giant castle model with four towers, carried in by four men. The castle contained, among other things, a roast piglet, a swan cooked and redressed in its own plumage, a roast boar's head and a pike cooked and sauced in three different ways without having been cut into pieces, all of them breathing fire. (Note: The effect was created by placing wax candles bound with strips of cotton that had been soaked in alcohol in the mouth of the animals and lighting them.) The battlements of the castle were adorned with the banners of the Duke and his guests, manned by miniature archers, and inside the castle there was a fountain that gushed rosewater and spiced wine.

In the 17th century, the Duke of Buckingham presented a memorable banquet in honor of his royal guests, Charles I and Queen Henrietta Maria, which included a pie prepared to conceal a human being—the famous dwarf of the era, Jeffrey Hudson.

== Entremets in the "Classical Order" of table service ==
In the Petit traicté and later editions of the book, including the Livre fort excellent, in a collection of menus at the end of the book, the meal is presented in four stages : the entree de table (entrance to the table), potaiges (foods boiled or simmered "in pots"), services de rost (meat or fowl "roasted" in dry heat), and issue de table (departure from the table). Between the mid-16th and mid-17th century, the stages of the meal underwent several significant changes. Notably, potage became the first stage of the meal, the entrée became the second stage, and dishes of entremets came to be served in their own distinct stage. By 1650, the term "entremets" had come to refer not just to the dishes, but also to the stage of the meal where they were served, after the potage, entrée, and roast, and before the dessert.

While cookbooks and dictionaries of the 17th and 18th centuries rarely discuss the type of dishes appropriate to each stage of the meal with any specificity, entremets and the dishes of the other stages can be distinguished from each other by certain characteristics, such as their ingredients, cooking methods, and serving temperatures. The distinct characteristics of the entremets were at first loosely observed, but by the early 18th century, certain ingredients and cooking methods were increasingly confined to the entremets stage of the meal.

In the 17th, 18th, and 19th centuries, entremets on meat days (Note: In accordance with church regulations in force from the Middle Ages to the 19th century, the ingredients for every stage of the meal varied between "meat days" (jours gras, literally "fat days"), when all foods were allowed, and "lean days" (jours maigres), when the church forbade consumption of meat and fowl but not fish. Until the 16th century, white meats (milk, cream, butter, and cheese) and eggs were additionally forbidden in Lent, but beginning in the 17th century, white meats were allowed in Lent. Beginning in the 19th century, eggs were also allowed in Lent.) included butchers' meats, suckling pig, fowl, furred and feathered game, and offal, all of which were also used for entrées. Entremets additionally included ham, eggs, cheese, vegetables, fruits, and sugar, ingredients that were used sparingly or not at all for entrées.

Entremets in the Classical Order of service were widely varied preparations of primarily three types: chilled meats, hot vegetables, and hot and chilled sweet dishes.

Meat, fowl, and game served as entremets were almost exclusively chilled dishes. Many entremets were meat dishes that would have been entrées if served hot, but were entremets when served chilled, including sautés, ragoûts, fricassées, pâtés, and pies. Other chilled entremets included svaroy aspics, custards, forcemeat on toast, and salads.

A few meats were served either hot or cold as entremets. Ham, rare as an entrée, was almost exclusively served as an entremets, hot or cold. Offal, sometimes served as an entrée, was more commonly served as an entremets, hot or cold. Eggs, commonly served as entrées on lean days out of Lent, were sometimes served as hot entremets on meat days.

Vegetables were served hot as entremets. Notably, dishes of vegetables were never served as entrées; they might make up part of a sauce or garnish for an entrée, but vegetables were served by themselves only as entremets.

Fritters and other fried dishes of vegetables, fruits, cheese, or offal were also served hot as entremets. Fritters and fried dishes of meat and fowl, though, were served as entrées.

Finally, various sweet dishes were served as entremets. They were generally presented alongside the savory entremets, but the sweet entremets were consumed after the savory ones. Dried, preserved, and raw fruit were not served as entremets; they were served in the dessert stage of the meal.

On lean days, fish replaced meat and fowl in every stage of the meal. Entremets on fish days were composed of crustaceans, frogs, turtles, anchovies, and fish organs including monkfish liver and carp roe. Other common entremets included chilled fish aspics, pies, and pâtés; eel cervelat; and anchovy paste spread on toast. Other fish served as entremets were often fried or, more rarely, stewed and served hot, including carp, monkfish, salmon, sole, trout, and turbot. Entremets that did not include meat were served on both meat and lean days, such as vegetables and, out of Lent, eggs and sweet custards.

== Changes in the 19th and 20th centuries ==
Over the course of the 19th century, vegetable entremets were increasingly served along with the roast rather than as a separate course. By the end of the century, the vegetable entremets listed on menus were generally intended as side dishes or garnishes for the roast or relevé. A distinct course of vegetable entremets after the roast did survive into the 20th century in the form of salads or certain vegetables like asparagus, but such dishes were no longer called entremets.

By the 20th century, entremets had come to refer only to sweet dishes served near the end of the meal.. Today in France an entremets is a distinguished, if not pedantic, word for dessert.

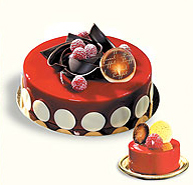
In modern times, entremets are multi-layer desserts with various layered elements.

The word "entremets" may also refer more narrowly to a multi-layer dessert composed of various elements. The dessert typically comprises a sponge cake base, mousse filling and layers of inserted set elements such as creams, jellies and compotes. Each element is created in individual rings or molds before being assembled into layers in another mold to build the entremet; a mousse is added to surround these layers and form the body of the dessert. After setting in the freezer, a mirror glaze or coating is usually added to the exterior of the entremet.

== See also ==
- Entremés
- Hors d'oeuvre – Small dish served before main meal
- Intermezzo (disambiguation)
- Medieval cuisine – Foods, eating habits, and cooking methods of the Middle Ages
- Pièce montée – Decorative confectionery centerpiece
- Pop out cake – Oversized confection concealing a person inside

== Notes, references, and sources ==
=== Sources ===
- Adamson, Melitta Weiss (2004). Food in Medieval Times. Westport, CT: Greenwood Press. ISBN 0313321477.
- Albala, Ken; Tomasik, Timothy, eds. (2014). The Most Excellent Book of Cookery, Livre fort excellent de cuysine. Totnes, Devon: Prospect Books. ISBN 978-1903018965.
- Brereton, Georgine E.; Ferrier, Janet M., eds. (1981). Le Menagier de Paris. Oxford: Clarendon Press. ISBN 0198157487.
- Chiquart (2010). Scully, Terence (ed.). Du fait de cuisine / On Cookery of Master Chiquart (1420). Tempe, Arizona: Arizona Center for Medieval and Renaissance Studies (ACMRS). ISBN 978-0866984027.
- Flandrin, Jean-Louis (2007) [2001]. Arranging the Meal: A History of Table Service in France [L’Ordre des mets]. Translated by Johnson, Julie E. Berkeley: University of California Press. ISBN 978-0520238855.
- Henisch, Bridget Ann (1976). Fast and Feast: Food in Medieval Society. University Park: Penn State University Press. ISBN 0271012307.
- Hieatt, Constance B. (2002). "Medieval Britain". In Adamson, Melitta Weiss (ed.). Regional Cuisines of Medieval Europe: A Book of Essays. New York: Routledge. pp. 18–45. ISBN 0415929946.
- Hyman, Philip; Hyman, Mary (1992). "Les livres de cuisine et le commerce des recettes en France aux 15e et 16e siècles". In Carole Lambert (ed.). Du manuscrit à la table. Paris, Montréal: Champion-Slatkin—Les Presses de l'Université de Montréal. ISBN 978-2852037076.
- Jenkins, Jessica Kerwin (2010). Encyclopedia of the exquisite: An anecdotal history of elegant delights. New York: Nan A. Talese / Nan A. Talese / Doubleday. ISBN 978-0385529693.
- Montagné, Prosper (1938). Larousse Gastronomique. Paris: Librairie Larousse.
- Scott, Mary Augusta, ed. (1916). "Chapter 256. Epulario, or, the Italian Banquet". Elizabethan Translations from the Italian. Boston: Houghton Mifflin. pp. 333–34.
- Scully, Terence (1995). The Art of Cookery in the Middle Ages. Woodbridge: The Boydell Press. ISBN 0851156118.
- Scully, Terence, ed. (1988). The Viandier of Taillevent. Ottawa: University of Ottawa Press. ISBN 978-0776601748.
- Strong, Roy (2003). Feast: A History of Grand Eating. London: Pimlico. ISBN 0712667598.
- Tomasik, Timothy J. (May 2016). "Cuisine by the Cut of One's Trousers: Cookbook Marketing in Early Modern France". Food and History. 14 (2–3): 223–247. doi:10.1484/J.FOOD.5.115341. ISSN 1780-3187.
- TLFi (1994). "Entremets". TLFi: Trésor de la langue française informatisé. ATIL/CNRS Université de Lorraine.
