= Cameline sauce =

Medieval cinnamon sauce

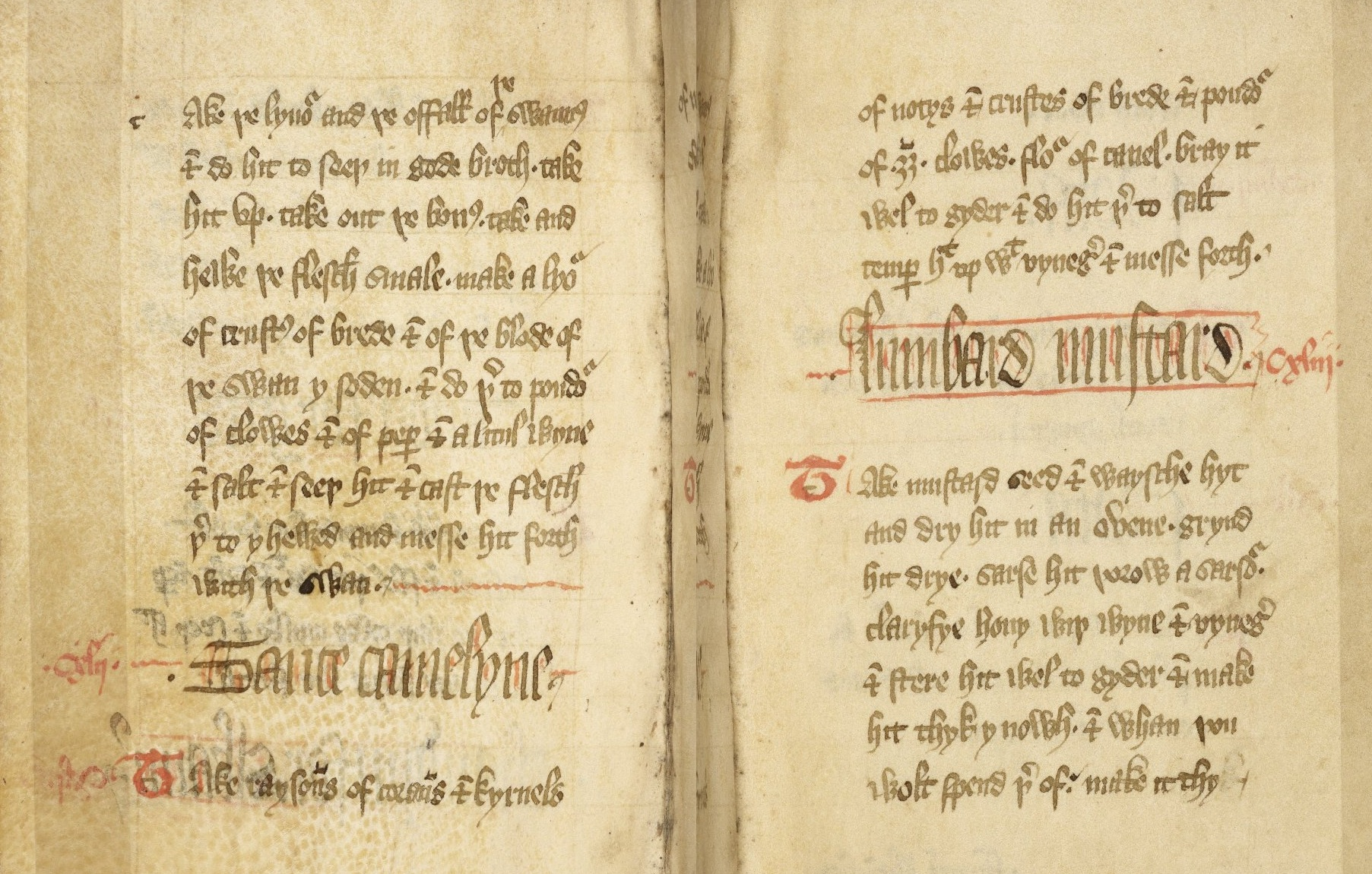
Sawse Camelyn in The Forme of Cury

Cameline sauce (French: sauce cameline) was a cinnamon-based sauce that was widely eaten among the upper class in medieval Western Europe, often alongside roasted meats. Ingredients other than cinnamon varied widely between recipes, though a typical sauce might include ginger, nutmeg, saffron, breadcrumbs, sugar and vinegar. Recipes appear throughout 14th- and 15th-century cookbooks. Cooks stopped making the sauce as simpler sauces made closer to service became fashionable, valuing the flavours of fresh ingredients like herbs over the spiced pungency of cameline sauce.

== Etymology ==
Cameline sauces consistently included cinnamon, lending the sauce flavour, camel-hair colour, and potentially, name. (Note: Some recipes exist for cameline sauces without cinnamon, although such was their rarity that Constance Bartlett Hieatt ascribes this as likely due to errors in transcribing recipes.) Theories of the etymology of cameline include a derivation from the French word for cinnamon, cannelle, a reference to its colour resembling the camel. (Note: Colours were important to medieval diners, and cooks sought to cook dishes, and particularly sauces, in a range of colours so as to be pleasing to the eye.) Another theory, that the Oxford English Dictionary describes as "conjectured", tells that "cameline" was a corruption of chamælīnum, the equivalent of the Greek *χαμαίλινον 'dwarf flax'.

== Preparation ==
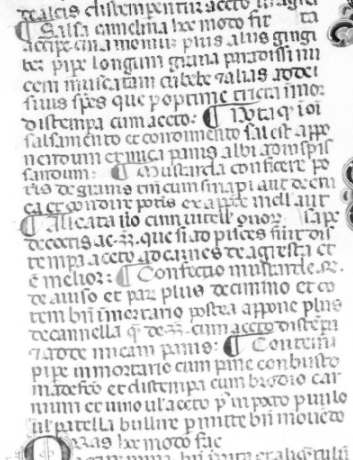
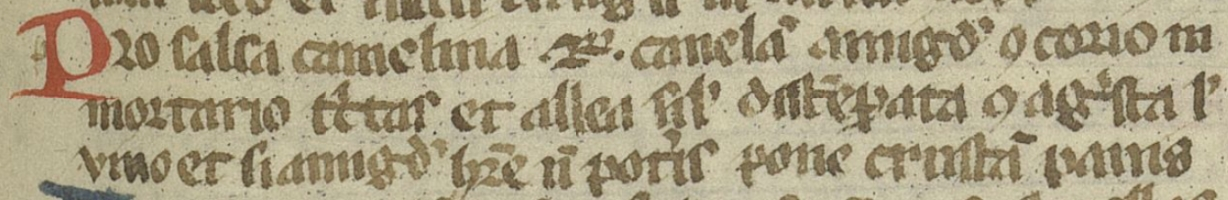
Cameline sauce in the texts Treatise on the Ways of Preparing and Seasoning All Kinds of Food and Liber de Coquina

Beyond the use of cinnamon, preparations of cameline sauce varied widely. Ginger was a typical inclusion in France, as were cloves in Italy; all had the pungent flavours that were typical of medieval cooking. Around fifty recipes are identified during the 14th and 15th centuries in Europe by the scholar Bruno Laurioux, making it the most cited sauce in cookbooks of the period; such was their prevalence that they could be purchased, pre-prepared from sauciers in France as of the 14th century. One intensely spiced recipe is given in the 1393 text Le Ménagier de Paris (The Parisian Household Manager), relaying a cameline sauce recipe of Tournai:

Cameline. Note that in Tournai, to make cameline, they grind ginger, cinnamon, saffron, and half a nutmeg; mix with wine, then take it out of the mortar. In a mortar, grind untoasted white breadcrumbs that have been soaked in cold water, add wine, and strain. Then boil it all, and at the end add red sugar; and that makes winter cameline. In summer, they prepare it the same way, except that it is not boiled. (Note: Cameline. Nota que à Tournay, pour faire cameline, l'en broye gingembre, canelle et saffren et demye noix muguette : destrempé de vin, puis osté du mortier; puis aiez mie de pain blanc, sans bruler, trempé en eaue froide et broyez au mortier, destrempez de vin et coulez , puis boulez tout, et mettez au derrain du succre roux: et ce est cameline d'yver. Et en esté la font autelle, mais elle n'est point boulie.)

The red colour of the sugar here is sometimes translated to mean brown sugar, although some historians speculate red colouration may have arisen from the addition of spices. Sweet flavours in cameline sauces were rare in early French preparations compared to those in Italy, where cameline sauces often included sugar or saba, a syrup made from concentrated grape must. Bread was used as a thickener; in other recipes, chicken livers, eggs, or ground almonds during Lent completed the same role, though never flour. The 14th-century text Le Viandier, authored by the French cook Guillaume Tirel, is traditionally credited with the technique of straining sauce to produce a smoother texture.

Sugar featured more often in French preparations from the 15th century, as seen in the Du fait de cuisine, written in 1420 by the master chef of Amadeus VIII, Duke of Savoy. The cameline sauce in Du fait de cuisine was flavored with expensive spices, including mace (made from the aril of nutmeg), and grains of paradise imported from Africa.

English cameline sauces were distinct too. In the cookbook The Forme of Cury, compiled c. 1390, a recipe for the sauce appears under the name "Sawse Camelyn", distinct from the cameline sauce of Le Ménagier de Paris by the avoidance of boiling and the unusual inclusion of currants and nuts:

Take raisins of Courance, and kernels of nuts, and crusts of bread, and powder of ginger, cloves, cinnamon flour. Grind it well together and add salt. Temper it with vinegar, and serve it forth. (Note: Take raysouns of coraunce & kyrnels of notys & crustes of brede & powdour of gynger, clowes, flour of canel; bray it wel togyder and do thereto salt. Temper it up with vynegar, and serve it forth.)

Flavour contrasts such as the sweetness of raisins and the bitterness of some nuts (for instance, walnuts) was typical of English cameline sauces. Theirs were also more heavily spiced than French or Italian versions, often including ginger, cloves, nutmeg, and saffron, the last intensifying the colour already contributed by cinnamon.

Like the English, Catalan cooks spiced their cameline sauces with ginger, cloves, and nutmeg and used their cameline sauces to emphasize flavour contrasts. Rather than mixing their spices with wine, broth was often used. Cameline sauce was known in the region as salsa camelina, and is mentioned in satirical accounts of Jewish feasts and the 15th-century cookbook The Book of Sent Soví. The book's recipe was served with chicken and capon, and like the cameline sauces of Italy, contained sugar and chicken liver, alongside almond milk, chicken broth, and pomegranate wine or red vinegar. The appearance in a late-15th-century Italian cameline sauce recipe of almond milk, broth, and sour pomegranate juice to balance sweet flavours is described by Laurioux as demonstrating clear influence from Catalonia and broader Iberia.

== Serving ==
Cameline sauce was common among the upper class in medieval Western Europe, included in diets across England, Italy, Catalonia, Denmark, and France. The sauce was served in deep dishes known as écuelle, as part of a selection of sauces to be eaten with game or roast meat such as crane, rabbit, or veal, or sometimes fish. Historian Melitta Weiss Adamson speculates combinations with fish may have been based on associations under humorism, noting that cinnamon, regarded as hot and dry, may have been seen to aid in the digestion of cold and moist fish.

At feasts, the sauce was sometimes integrated into galimafrée, a dish between a soup and stew, alongside ingredients including bacon, chicken, spices, and wine. In Renaissance Italy, cameline sauce was served alongside other sauces, to be eaten with small, fried foods, pastries, and cured meat. In one preparation, a fish was kept whole, with the tail boiled, the centre roasted, and the front fried. Each was served with a different sauce, cameline paired with fried meat.

As simpler sauces prepared closer to service with fresh ingredients such as herbs became more prominent, cameline sauce became increasingly rare and eventually stopped being made altogether.

== See also ==
- List of sauces
- List of medieval dishes
- Other historical sauces:
  - Chawdron
  - Galantine
  - Garum
  - Murri

== Sources ==
- Adamson, Melitta Weiss (2004). Food in Medieval Times. Wesport, Connecticut: Greenwood Press. ISBN 0-313-32147-7.
- "cameline". Oxford English Dictionary (online ed.). Oxford University Press. doi:10.1093/OED/4792793301. (Subscription or participating institution membership required.)
- Fagan, Brian (2006). Fish on Friday: Feasting, Fasting, and the Discovery of the New World. New York: Basic Books. ISBN 978-0-465-02284-7.
- Ferguson, Priscilla Parkhurst (2014). "The French Invention of Modern Cuisine". In Freedman, Paul; Chaplin, Joyce E; Albala, Ken (eds.). Food in Time and Place: The American Historical Association Companion to Food History. Oakland, California: University of California. ISBN 978-0-520-27745-8.
- Greco, Gina L; Rose, Christine M (2009). The Good Wife’s Guide: A Medieval Household Book. Ithaca, New York: Cornell University Press. ISBN 978-0-8014-4738-9.
- Hieatt, Constance B; Hosington, Brenda; Butler, Sharon (1996) [1976]. Pleyn Delit: Medieval Cookery for Modern Cooks (2nd ed.). Toronto, Ontario, Buffalo, New York, and London: University of Toronto Press. ISBN 0802076327.
- Laurioux, Bruno (2002). Manger au Moyen Âge: Pratiques et discours alimentaires en Europe au XIVe et XVe siècles [Eating in the Middle Ages: Food Practices and Discourses in Europe in the Fourteenth and Fifteenth Centuries] (in French). Paris: Hachette. ISBN 2-01-235443-2.
- Piñer, Hélène Jawhara (2022). Jews, Food, and Spain: The Oldest Medieval Spanish Cookbook and the Sephardic Culinary Heritage. Boston, Massachusetts: Academic Studies Press. ISBN 978-1-644-69918-8.
- Redon, Odile; Sabban, Françoise; Serventi, Silvano (1998). The Medieval Kitchen: Recipes from France and Italy. Chicago, Illinois: The University of Chicago Press. ISBN 0-226-70684-2.
- Revel, Jean-François (1982) [1979 as Un festin en paroles]. Culture and Cuisine: A Journey Through the History of Food. New York: Doubleday. ISBN 0-385-15107-1.
- Strong, Roy (2003) [2002]. Feast: A History of Grand Eating. London: Pimlico. ISBN 0-7126-6759-8.
