= Umbricia gens =

Ancient Roman family

The gens Umbricia was a minor plebeian family at ancient Rome. Only a few members of this gens are mentioned by Roman writers, but they had achieved senatorial rank by the second century. The most famous of the Umbricii are probably the haruspex Gaius Umbricius Melior, who served the emperors of the middle first century, and Aulus Umbricius Scaurus, a merchant of Pompeii whose fish sauces were widely distributed. Quintus Umbricius Proculus was a second-century governor of Hispania Citerior. Many other Umbricii are known from inscriptions.

== Origin ==
The nomen Umbricius belongs to a class of gentilicia formed from cognomina ending in -ex and -icus. The surname Umbricus refers to a native of Umbria, and thus is cognate with the nomina of the gentes Umbria, Umbrena, and Umbrilia, indicating that their ancestors were probably Umbrians.

== Praenomina ==
The main praenomina of the Umbricii were Aulus, Gaius, Lucius, and Quintus, all of which were common throughout Roman history. They occasionally used other common names, including Marcus, Sextus, and Publius.

== Branches and cognomina ==
Although the greatest number of inscriptions of this gens come from the city of Rome, a substantial family of the Umbricii seems to have lived at Pompeii in Campania, where they engaged in the manufacture of fish sauces that were widely sold in Italy, Gaul, and north Africa, and were prominent in the civic life of the town. Although Pompeii was destroyed by the eruption of Mount Vesuvius in AD 79, various inscriptions show that the Umbricii settled in other parts of Italy, including other towns of Campania, Latium, and Etruria.

== Members ==
This list includes abbreviated praenomina. For an explanation of this practice, see filiation.

- Marcus Umbricius M. f., one of the priests of Jupiter on the island of Ortygia in Achaia in the late second century BC.
- Quintus Umbricius Q. f. Flaccus, buried at Nomentum in Latium, in a family sepulchre built by Titus Titius Tappo, dating from the Augustan era.
- Publius Umbricius Rufus, one of the pontifices at Sutrium in Etruria during the late first century BC, or the first half of the first century AD. He was chosen in the place of Lucius Plotius Cipoll[ius?] and subsequently replaced by Marcus Aponius Celsus.
- Umbricia L. l. Helena, a freedwoman named in an inscription from Rome, dating from the first half of the first century, along with Lucius Saenius Faustus.
- Umbricia Philaenis, inurned in a cinerarium from Clusium in Etruria, dating from the first half of the first century.
- Aulus Umbricius Scaurus, a manufacturer of garum, liquamen, (Note: Both types of fish sauce; garum was made from selected portions of the fish, while liquamen was made from whole fish.) and muria (Note: Brine.) at Pompeii in Campania during the middle portion of the first century. His workshop employed several freedmen, including Umbricius Abascantus, Umbricius Agathopus, Umbricia Fortunata, and at least one slave, Eutyche. He may have been the father of the duumvir Scaurus.
- Aulus Umbricius Abascantus, a freedman employed in the middle first-century garum factory of Aulus Umbricius Scaurus at Pompeii.
- Umbricius Agathopus, a freedman employed in the middle first-century garum factory of Aulus Umbricius Scaurus at Pompeii.
- Umbricia Fortunata, a freedwoman employed in the middle first-century garum factory of Aulus Umbricius Scaurus at Pompeii.
- Aulus Umbricius Modestus, named in several inscriptions from Pompeii.
- Umbricius Pos[...], named in a middle first-century sepulchral inscription from Mutina in Cisalpine Gaul.
- Umbricia Restituta, built a tomb at Rome, dating from the latter half of the first century, for her sons, Auxetus and Saturninus.
- Umbricia, the slave of Antiochis, named in two inscriptions from Pompeii, dating from AD 56.
- Umbricia Januaria, named in an inscription from Pompeii, dating from AD 56.
- Gaius Umbricius C. f. Melior, a haruspex employed by the emperors. He warned Galba of a plot against him in AD 69. He was buried at Tarentum in Calabria, in a tomb built at public expense, dating from the Flavian Dynasty.
- Gaius Umbricius Melior, perhaps a different man from the haruspex, inurned at Rome in a cinerarium dating from the Flavian Dynasty, dedicated by Sostrates Philomusus.
- Lucius Umbricius Priscus, made an offering to Sol at Rome, according to an inscription dating from the latter half of the first century.
- Gaius Umbricius Veientanus, built a sepulchre at Rome, dating between AD 60 and 80, for himself, his wife, Umbricia Delphis, and their children, Veiento and Umbricia Dido.
- Umbricia Delphis, buried at Rome in a sepulchre dating between AD 60 and 80, built by her husband, Gaius Umbricius Veientanus, for himself, his wife, and their children, Veiento and Umbricia Dido.
- (Gaius Umbricius) C. f. Veiento, a youth buried at Rome, aged twelve, in a sepulchre built by his father, Gaius Umbricius Veientanus, for himself, his wife, Umbricia Delphis, and their children, Veiento and Umbricia Dido, dating between AD 60 and 80.
- Umbricia C. f. Dido, buried at Rome, aged twenty, in a sepulchre built by her father, Gaius Umbricius Veientanus, for himself, his wife, Umbricia Delphis, and their children, Veiento and Dido, dating between AD 60 and 80.
- Aulus Umbricius A. f. Scaurus, one of the duumvirs of Pompeii, where he was buried circa AD 74 or 75, in a tomb built partly at public expense, with an equestrian statue, dedicated by his father, (Note: It's unclear whether this Scaurus is the same person as the garum manufacturer, or his son, but in either case, there were at least two persons, father and son, by this name at Pompeii.) Aulus Umbricius Scaurus.
- Lucius Umbricius Priscus, made a first- or second-century offering at Rome.
- Lucius Umbricius Secundus, one of the seviri Augustales, buried at Bononia in Cisalpine Gaul, in a first- or second-century tomb dedicated by Nymphodotus.
- Umbricius, a friend of Juvenal, who, disillusioned with Rome, moved to Cumae in Campania.
- Umbricia Pia, buried at Rome, in a tomb built by her patron, Umbricia Severa, dating between the middle of the first century and the middle of the second.
- Umbricia Severa, built a tomb at Rome for her client, Umbricia Pia, dating between the middle of the first century and the middle of the second.
- Aulus Umbricius A. l. Successus, a freedman buried at Puteoli in Campania, in a tomb built by his freedmen and clients, Onesiphorus, Agathangelus, and Acutus, dating from the late first century, or the first half of the second.
- Umbricia Hedia, buried at Rome, in a sepulchre dating between the middle of the first century and the end of the second, built by her friend, Cusinia Hygia, for herself, her husband, Aulus Fulvius Clymenus, and Hedia.
- Gaius Umbricius Pantagatus, a freedman, and formerly the home-born slave of Clodia Fortuna, was buried at Rome, aged fifteen years, five months, thirteen days, and ten hours, in a tomb dating between the middle of the first century and the end of the second.
- Aulus Umbricius Probus, dedicated a tomb at Rome, dating between the middle of the first century and the end of the second, for his brother, Aulus Umbricius Sedatus.
- Aulus Umbricius Sedatus, a soldier in the twelfth urban cohort, who served in the century of Egnatius, was buried at Rome, aged eighteen, having served for eleven months, in a timb built by his brother, Aulus Umbricius Probus, dating between the middle of the first century and the end of the second.
- Quintus Umbricius Proculus, probably a different man from the governor Proculus, was one of the duumvirs at Florentia in Etruria during the early or middle part of the second century.
- Aulus Umbricius Magnus, together with his wife, Clodia Felicitas, dedicated a second-century tomb at Puteoli for their daughter, Umbricia Justa.
- Umbricia A. f. Justa, a young woman buried at Puteoli, in a second-century tomb built by her parents, Aulus Umbricius Magnus and Clodia Felicitas.
- Lucius Umbricius Clemens, perhaps a centurion primus pilus, built a second-century tomb at the site of modern Sinalunga in Etruria for his kinsman, Gaius Umbricius Celer.
- Gaius Umbricius L. f. Celer, a native of Arretium in Etruria, was an eques, or cavalryman, in the ninth cohort of the praetorian guard, serving in the century of Cominius. He was buried at the site of modern Sinalunga, aged forty, having served for sixteen years, in a second-century tomb built by Lucius Umbricius Clemens.
- Quintus Umbricius Proculus, governor of Hispania Citerior at some point in the second century, was buried at Tarraco.
- Umbricia Matronica, buried in a second-century sepulchre at Rome, along with Antistia Fortunata and Quintus Minicius. According to the inscription, her husband, Apolaustus, was permitted the use of her estate, but if anyone sold the tomb, twenty thousand sestertii were to be paid to the Vestal Virgins.
- Umbricia Pyramis, buried at the site of modern Sinalunga, in a second-century tomb built by her husband.
- Umbricia Severa, perhaps the wife of the freedman Gaius Umbricius Venustus, was buried at Rome in a second-century sepulchre built by Venustus for himself, Umbricia, and Valeria Prisca.
- Umbricia, a Roman matron banished by Hadrian for a period of five years, because she treated her slaves with unjustified cruelty.
- Aulus Umbricius Lupus, buried at Puteoli, aged twenty years, ten days, in a tomb dedicated by his parents, Sallustia Restuta and Lupus, dating from the second century, or the early part of the third.
- Sextus Umbricius, a soldier named in an inscription from Rome, dating from the latter half of the second century.
- Gaius Umbricius Alco, the father of Umbricia Alce, honoured by the town of Ferentium in Etruria, according to an inscription belonging to the latter half of the second century, or the first quarter of the third.
- Umbricia C. f. Alce, honoured by the town of Ferentium, in memory of her father, Gaius Umbricius Alco, according to an inscription belonging to the latter half of the second century, or the first quarter of the third.
- Umbricia Ammias, along with her husband, Marcus Aurelius Alexander, a freedman of the emperor, built a late second-century tomb at Rome for their son, Marcus Aurelius Myro, and daughter, Aurelia Monnina, aged eighteen.
- Umbricia Bassa, the wife of Titus Aelius Antipater, a procurator Augusti, with whom she made an offering to Jupiter, Sol Invictus, and Sarapis at Sentinum, between the middle of the second century and the middle of the third.
- Quintus Umbricius Nemesius, a soldier in the fifth cohort of the vigiles at Rome in AD 205. He served in the century of Rufinus.
- Umbricia Maxima, made an offering to the Magna Mater at Apulum in Dacia, dating between the middle of the second and the late third century.
- Umbricius Vitalius, one of the veteran decurions of the auxiliary regiments Gallica and I Thracum Mauretana, named in an inscription from Egypt in AD 199.
- Umbricia Maxima, dedicated a third-century tomb at Rome for her daughter, Lusania Maxima, aged twenty-six years, eight months, and seventeen days.
- Umbricius Rufinus, buried at Cirta in Numidia, along with his son, Umbricius Rufus, in a tomb dating from the middle portion of the third century.
- Umbricia Tatias, buried at Rome, in a sarcophagus dating from the latter half of the third century.
- Umbricia Abundantia, along with her son-in-law, Crispinus, built a tomb at Interamna Nahars in Umbria for her daughter, Nervinia Euresia, aged about twenty-nine, buried the sixth day before the Kalends of March (Note: February 24, by modern reckoning.), AD 386.

=== Undated Umbricii ===
- Umbricia, named in an inscription from Rome, accusing someone of theft.
- Umbricius, named in various pottery inscriptions from Mutina.
- Umbricius, named in several inscriptions from Canusium in Apulia.
- Lucius Umbricius, a potter whose wares were found in Cisalpine Gaul, Aquitania, Belgica, Etruria, and Africa Proconsularis.
- Quintus Umbricius Q. (f.), named in an inscription from Truentum in Picenum.
- Umbricius Aemilianus, a prefect in the third cohort of the vigiles at Ostia in Latium.
- Umbricia Bassa, buried at Rome, in a tomb dedicated by Lucius Mammius Apsyrtus.
- Gaius Umbricius C. f. Canso, buried at Florentia, along with his wife, Volturnia Tertulla, in a tomb built by a decree of the decurions of the town.
- Lucius Umbricius Carpus, built a tomb at Rome for Apate.
- Gaius Umbricius Fortunatus, buried at Rome, along with Umbricia Procula, perhaps his wife.
- Sextus Umbricius Sex. f. Fortunatus, buried at Thugga in Africa Proconsularis, aged eighteen.
- Aulus Umbricius Gallus, buried at Thibilis in Numidia, aged forty-five.
- Marcus Umbricius M. l. Hilarus, a freedman from Aeclanum in Samnium, buried at Narbo in Gallia Narbonensis.
- Marcus Umbricius C. l. Menoma, a freedman named in an inscription from Clusium.
- Gaius Umbricius Philologus, a potter whose wares were found at Ariminum, Arretium, Clusium, Carthage in Africa Proconsularis, and various locations in Aquitania.
- Umbricia Pia, buried at Rome in a tomb built by at least one of her children.
- Umbricia Procula, buried at Rome, along with Gaius Umbricius Fortunatus, perhaps her husband.
- Umbricia Restuta, built a tomb at Rome for her son, Restutus, aged nine years, six months.

== See also ==
- List of Roman gentes

== Bibliography ==
- Gaius Plinius Secundus (Pliny the Elder), Historia Naturalis (Natural History).
- Publius Cornelius Tacitus, Historiae.
- Lucius Mestrius Plutarchus (Plutarch), Lives of the Noble Greeks and Romans.
- Decimus Junius Juvenalis, Satirae (Satires).
- Digesta, or Pandectae (The Digest).
- Theodor Mommsen et alii, Corpus Inscriptionum Latinarum (The Body of Latin Inscriptions, abbreviated CIL), Berlin-Brandenburgische Akademie der Wissenschaften (1853–present).
- Charlton T. Lewis and Charles Short, A Latin Dictionary, Clarendon Press, Oxford (1879).
- René Cagnat et alii, L'Année épigraphique (The Year in Epigraphy, abbreviated AE), Presses Universitaires de France (1888–present).
- George Davis Chase, "The Origin of Roman Praenomina", in Harvard Studies in Classical Philology, vol. VIII, pp. 103–184 (1897).
- Paul von Rohden, Elimar Klebs, & Hermann Dessau, Prosopographia Imperii Romani (The Prosopography of the Roman Empire, abbreviated PIR), Berlin (1898).
- La Carte Archéologique de la Gaule (Archaeological Map of Gaul, abbreviated CAG), Académie des Inscriptions et Belles-Lettres (1931–present).
- Francesco Grelle and Mario Pani, Le Epigrafi Romane di Canosa (The Roman Epigraphy of Canusium), Edipuglia, Bari (1985, 1990).
- Mario Torelli, Studies in the Romanization of Italy, Helena Fracchia and Maurizio Gualtieri, trans., University of Alberta Press (1995).
- Kaja Harter-Uibopuu, "Erwerb und Veräusserung von Grabstätten im griechisch-römischen Kleinasien am Beispiel der Grabinschriften aus Smyrna" (Acquisition and sale of tombs in Graeco-Roman Asia Minor using the example of the tomb inscriptions from Smyrna), in Symposion, G. Thür, ed. (2009).
