= The Boke of Nurture =

Medieval household management manual

The Boke of Nurture folowing Englondis gise is a medieval manual of household management, written around the mid-15th century. It is attributed to the Englishman John Russell. The Boke of Nurture was written for household officers of noble and wealthy households, and contains recipes and sample menus for dinners, among other guidance.

Russell claims to have held the roles of usher and marshall under Humphrey, Duke of Gloucester (d. 1447), identifying himself in rhymes within the book's introduction as "sum tyme servande with duke umfrey of glowcester, a prynce fulle royalle, with whom uschere in chambur was y, and marshalle also in halle". These roles entailed seating guests at dinners, including responsibility for ordering them by seniority and rank, enforcing an elaborate hierarchy. The book's authorship by Russell is uncertain—shorter, less developed versions exist from around 1430 to 1450 in the manuscripts at the British Library Sloane 1315 and 2027, and they do not attribute an author. The first text crediting Russell as author came in Harley 4011, circa 1460–70.

Beyond menus and recipes, the text contains references to numerous species of fish. Among these, it includes specimens such as beavers, whelks, seals and crabs that are no longer considered within the category. Russell comments on beavers that their tails "accounted a very delicate dish", and gives particular attention to eels, often used in eel pie, listing around 50 varieties. Russell's Boke of Nurture contained health advice, alongside its recipes. "Beware of salads, green foods and raw fruit" Russell wrote, "for they lead many a man to have a sensitive stomach".

An edition was published in London in 1868 by the English philologist Frederick James Furnivall within the collection Early English meals and manners. Much of the contents of Russell's Boke of Nurture appear in an approximate form in The Boke of Kervyng, printed by Wynkyn de Worde in 1508.

== Sources ==
- Dalby, Andrew (2000). Dangerous Tastes: The Story of Spices. Berkeley, California: University of California Press. ISBN 0-520-22789-1.
- Laurioux, Bruno (2006). "Alimentation de cour, alimentation à la cour au Moyen Âge: nouvelles orientations de recherche". Food and History (in French). 4 (1): 9–27. doi:10.1484/j.food.2.302441.
- Mead, William Edward (2019) [1931]. Routledge Library Editions: The Medieval World. New York, New York: Taylor & Francis. ISBN 978-0-367-22090-7.
- Power, Eileen (1992) [1928]. "Introduction". The Goodman of Paris (Le Ménagier de Paris): A Treatise on Moral and Domestic Economy by a Citizen of Paris (c. 1393). Translated by Power, Eileen. London: Folio Society.
- Woolgar, C M (2016). The Culture of Food in England, 1200-1500. New Haven, Connecticut & London: Yale University Press. ISBN 978-0-300-18191-3.
