= Chawdron =

Historical British sauce

Chawdron (meaning entrails) was a British spiced gravy made with breadcrumbs, swan blood and giblets during the medieval and early modern periods. It was served hot, often with roasted or simmered swan, and had a dark, almost black appearance. Chawdron was known under a range of spellings, including chaudron, chawdewyn, chaldron, and chawd-wyne.

Recipes varied, though they shared a basic method of boiling and chopping giblets, often with cleaned intestine. This was thickened by stirring in a paste of broth and bird blood. Finally, flavour was added in the form of ginger, spices, and wine or vinegar. The sauce originated in Britain, and a recipe appears in the Forme of Cury (c. 1390) for Chawdoun For Swannes:

Take þe lyuer and þe offall of the Swannes & do it to seeþ in gode broth. take it up. take out þe bonys. take & hewe the flessh smale. make a Lyour of crustes of brede & of þe blode of þe Swan ysoden. & do þerto powdour of clowes & of piper & of wyne & salt, & seeþ it & cast þe flessh þerto ihewed. and messe it forth with þe Swan.

Records from the household of George Plantagenet, Duke of Clarence in 1469 reference chawdron, noting that staff were permitted to retain the unused parts of swans so long as enough was left to make chawdron. In a sample menu published in the mid-15th century text The Boke of Nurture, chawdron appears as part of a first course, accompanying boiled beef, mutton, pheasant and swan. Chawdron was among the most popular sauces among the upper class over the following centuries, persisting into the 17th century, when Robert May provided a recipe in 1660.

== See also ==
- Blood as food
- Cameline sauce
- Glossary of historical culinary terms
- Medieval cuisine

== Sources ==
- Black, Maggie (1985). Food and Cooking in Medieval Britain: History and Recipes. Historic Buildings and Monuments Commission for England. ISBN 1-85074-081-X.
- Brears, Peter (2008). Cooking and Dining in Medieval England. Totnes, Devon: Prospect Books. ISBN 978-1-903018-55-2.
- Pegge, Samuel (1780) [1390]. The Forme of Cury. London: J. Nichols.
- Tebben, Maryann (2014). Sauces: A Global History. The Edible Series. London: Reaktion Books. ISBN 978-1-78023-351-2.
- Wilson, C Anne (1991). "Ideal Meals and their Menus from the Middle Ages to the Georgian Era". In Wilson, C Anne (ed.). The Appetite and the Eye: Visual Aspects of Food and Its Presentation Within Their Historic Context. Edinburgh: Edinburgh University Press. ISBN 0-7486-0101-5.
