= Umbricia Fortunata =

Roman businesswoman

- Born: 1st century AD
- Died: 79 AD; Pompeii
- Occupation: Businesswomen (garum producer)

Umbricia Fortunata (1st century AD) was a businesswoman known from the Roman city of Pompeii. She produced the popular seasoning garum, a fermented fish sauce.

== Life and career ==
Few details of Umbricia Fortunata's life can be established with any certainty, however, she is known from three tituli picti on the jars of urceus type. In Latin, she was a liquaminarium (from the generic Latin term, liquamen for fish sauces) by trade.

She was an employee of Umbricius Scarus, a major producer of garum in Pompeii. Scaurus owned a number of workshops in Pompeii, run by employed managers, whose names and roles are identified in inscriptions found on urcei, vessels that contained the sauce. One of these workshops was managed by Umbricia Fortunata. She is an excellent example of a Roman woman entrusted to manage the business of another.

Umbricia Fortunata was possibly Scaurus's freedwoman. It has been established that Umbricius Scarus normally employed his freedmen to manage his workshops, and the cognomen Fortunata, considered as cognomen servile, also makes this likely. However, some scholars have pointed out that she may also have been the Pompeian producer's relative — possibly his wife or sister.

She is one of several businesswomen identified in ancient Pompeii, contributing to information about Roman businesswomen; other examples of Pompeii businesswomen mentioned alongside her are Eumachia, Julia Felix, the freedwoman trader Naevoleia Tyche and the freedwomen moneylenders Poppaea Note and Dicidia Margaris. Recent scholarship, notably work by Piotr Berdowski of the University of Rzeszów, has identified a fuller range of trades and commercial activities involving businesswomen, including brick and tile production, pottery and ceramics, food production, cloth manufacture, commerce and finance.
