= Amphitheater of Lixus =

Ancient Roman amphitheater in Lixus, Morocco

Amphitheatre of Lixus
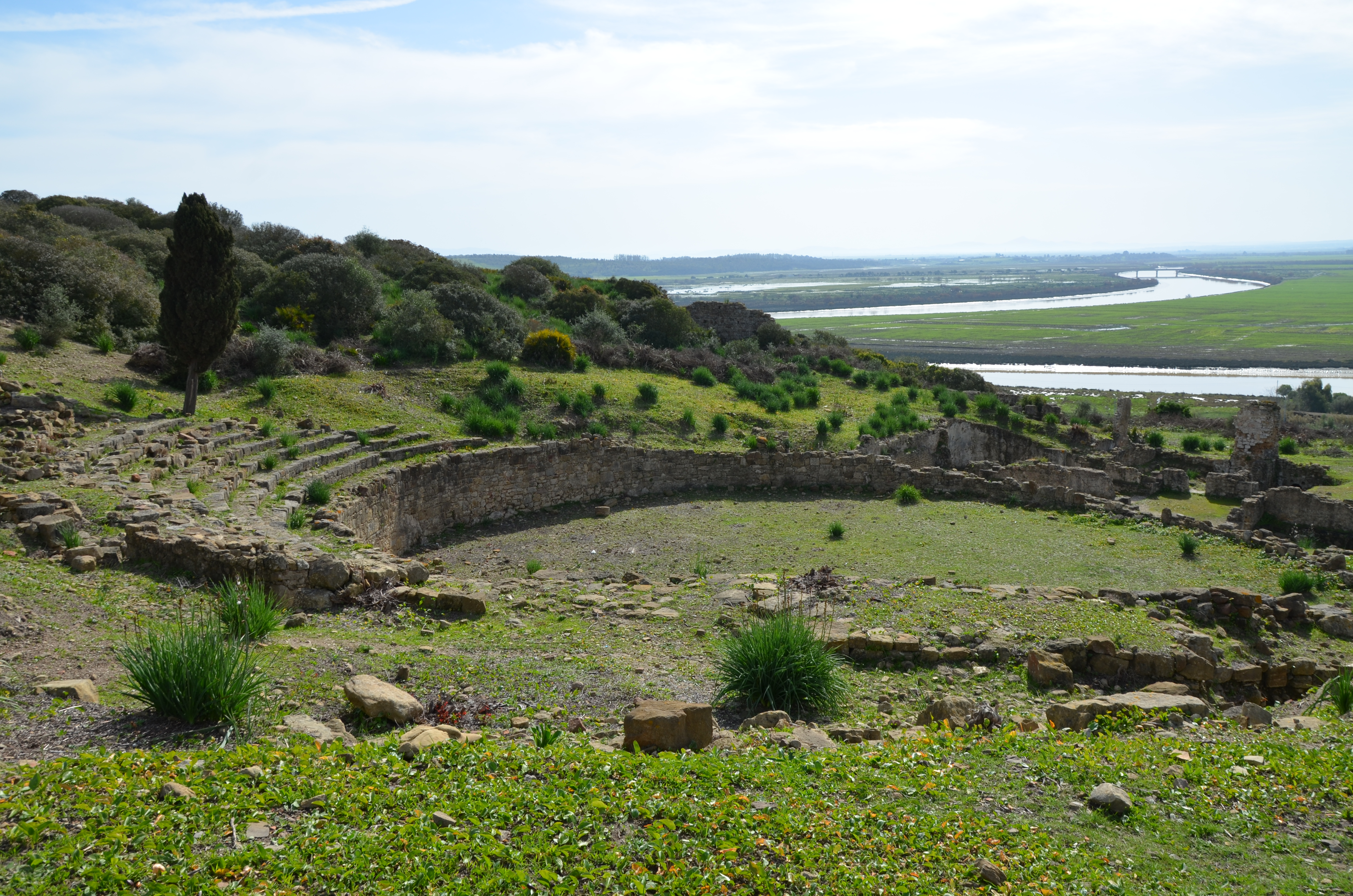
- Remains of the Amphitheater of Lixus

- Location within Morocco
- 35.1999004°N 6.1084683°W
- Type: amphitheater
- Periods: Roman Empire
- Location: Loukkos River, Morocco
- Region: Mauretania Tingitana, Larache

The Amphitheatre of Lixus was a Roman amphitheater located in Lixus, a city north of the modern seaport of Larache in Morocco. The amphitheater, much like Lixus itself, is largely in ruins.

== See also ==
- List of Roman amphitheatres
