= Ancient Cotta =

Ancient Roman town near Tangier, Morocco

Cotta
- Interactive map of Cotta
- 35.7558°N 5.9359°W
- Type: Settlement
- Location: Jbila, Tangier, Morocco
- Region: Mauretania Tingitana

History
- Built: After 40 AD
- Built by: Romans
- Abandoned: c. 3rd century AD

Site notes
- Excavation dates: 1965
- Archaeologists: Michel Ponsich and Miquel Tarradell
- Condition: Ruins

Cotta or Cotte was an ancient town built by Romans in the 1st century AD, in the province of Mauretania Tingitana, intended to function primarily as a garum factory. The town was likely abandoned in the 3rd century AD. Its ancient ruins are now located on the Atlantic coast of modern-day Morocco a few kilometers south of Cap Spartel, and include the garum factory, an olive press, a temple, a villa and a bath complex.

== Name ==
Some researchers have identified Cotta with "Gytte" from Hanno's voyage. Michel Ponsich highlighted the similarity of the name of Cotta to the ancient name of Cap Spartel, Kotes, which is related to "grapes". Pliny the Elder mentioned in his Natural History that beyond the pillars of Hercules, there existed formerly two settlements Lixus and Cotte. Bochart suggested that the name "Cotta" or "Cotte" may be derived from Hebrew "quothef" meaning "vine-dresser".

== History ==
The factory at Cotta was established in Mauretania Tingitana after the annexation of the Kingdom of Mauretania in 40 AD. It is one of several other factories established on both sides of the Mediterranean (North Africa and Iberia), and was intended to be a self-sufficient complex, given the presence of farming land nearby.

It is uncertain if Cotta is the same settlement mentioned by Pliny the Elder which, according to him, had been destroyed before the Roman period. The findings at the site point to an active exploitation no older than the 1st century AD.

The site was excavated by archaeologists Michel Ponsich and Miquel Tarradell in 1965. It is the most thoroughly excavated site of its kind in ancient Tingitana. Its structure is no different from other sites found for example at Lixus and Baelo Claudia.

Since the 1990s, the site has been integrated in the palace complex of a Saudi prince.

== Description ==
Cotta is located on the Atlantic coast, 14 kilometers southwest of Tangier, and 5 kilometers south of Cap Spartel.

The site is 56 meters long and 40 meters wide. It contains 16 basins of various sizes, surrounding a water reservoir. Along the basins, there are long halls for receiving and preparing fish, and on the other side there are ovens. There's also a space for producing oil, which contains oil presses and 3 basins. Ponsich also mentioned the presence of a 7 by 4.4 meters building, which he identified as a temple for Poseidon. He also identified 15 graves (already excavated by César Luis de Montalbán) which go back to the 2nd and 3rd centuries AD.
