= Tetouan Archaeological Museum =

Coordinates: 35.5706°N 5.3704°W

- متحف تطوان الأثري
- Established: 1939
- Location: Tetouan, Morocco
- Type: Archaeological Museum
- Website: www.maroc.net/museums/tetouan1.html

The Tetouan Archaeological Museum in Tétouan is considered one of the most prominent cultural and historical museums in Morocco, as its historical legacy extends back more than a century. It is located in the heart of the city of Tetouan in the northwest of the country.

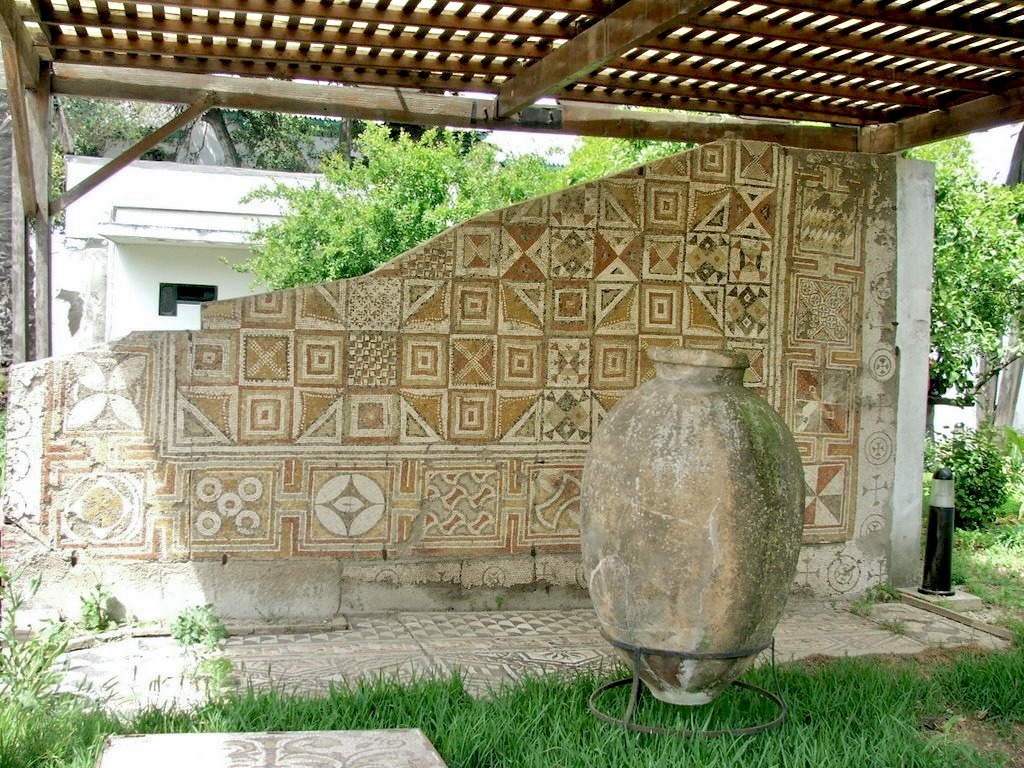

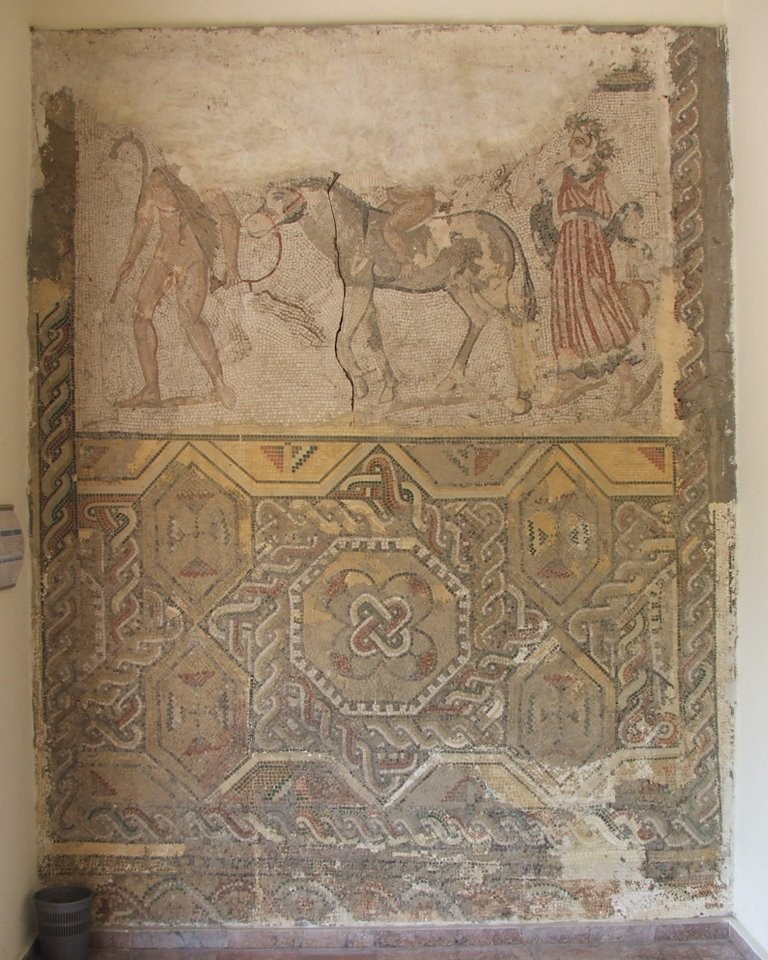

== Foundation and history ==
The Tétouan Archaeological Museum was established in 1939 as a step towards preserving the cultural and historical heritage of the region. The historic building that hosts the museum has been renovated and restored to be suitable for displaying and displaying cultural relics and artifacts.

== Museum content ==
The Tetouan Museum includes a collection of archaeological and historical pieces dating back to various time periods. The exhibits range from ancient pottery, jewelry, stone engravings, ancient coins, and daily tools that reflect the development of society in ancient times.

Many of the objects on display come from the Roman city of Lixus. The museum also received items from the Punic-Mauri site of Tamuda, excavated by César Luis de Montalbán from 1921 onward. In 2019 five items from the museum were added to the Moroccan list of national heritage museum objects. In 2022 the museum was one of nine in Morocco to send some of its objects on loan to the National Archaeological Museum in Madrid for a binational exhibition.
