= Garum =

Historical fermented fish sauce

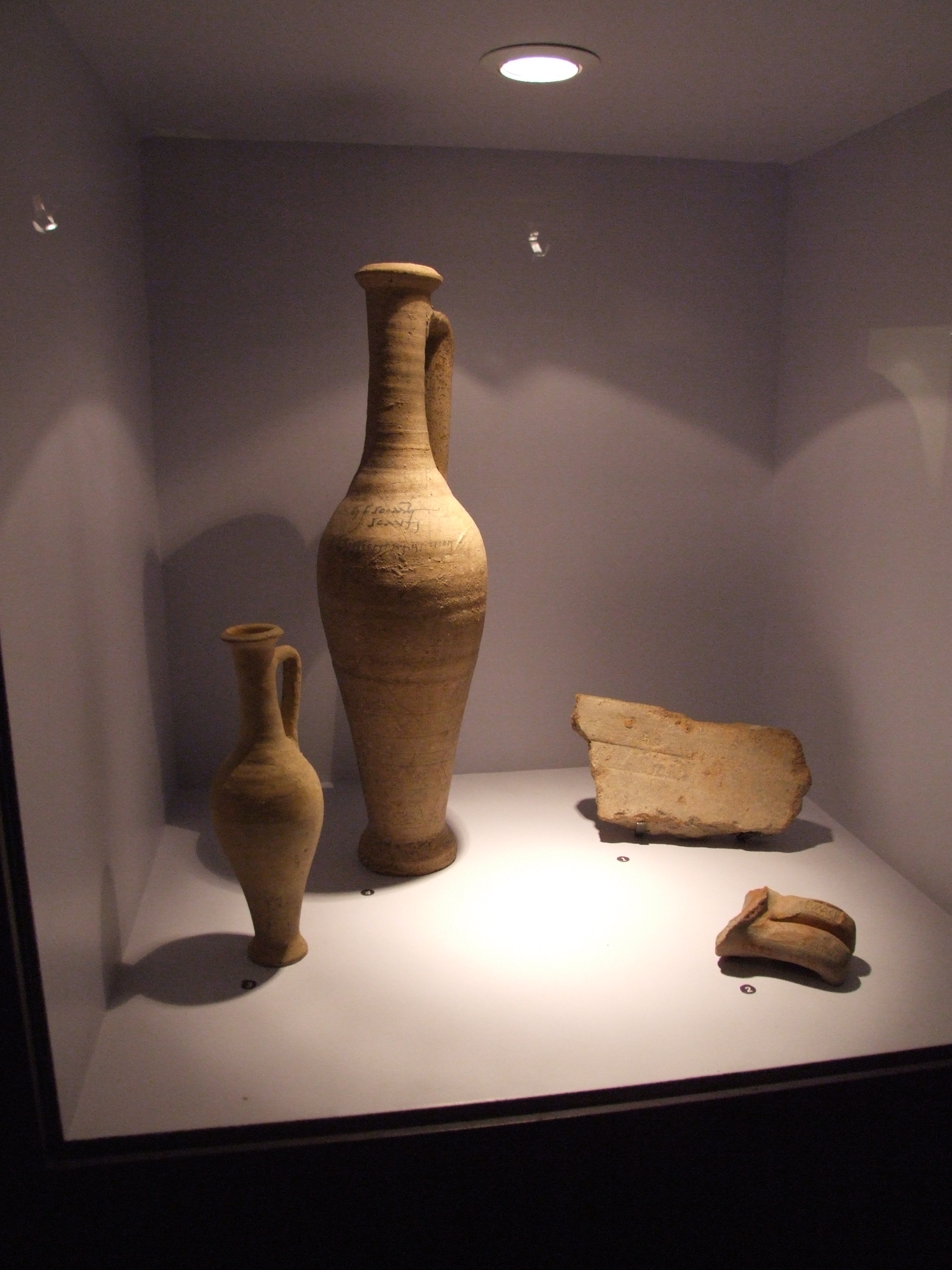
Garum amphorae from Pompeii

Garum is a fermented fish sauce that was used as a condiment in the cuisines of Phoenicia, ancient Greece, Rome, Carthage, and later Byzantium. Liquamen is a similar preparation, and at times they were synonymous. Although garum enjoyed its greatest popularity in the Western Mediterranean and the Roman world, it was in earlier use by the Greeks. The taste of garum is thought to have been comparable to that of today's Asian fish sauces.

Like modern fermented fish sauce and soy sauce, garum was a rich source of umami flavoring due to the presence of glutamates. It was used along with murri in medieval Byzantine and Arab cuisine to give a savory flavor to dishes. Murri may derive from garum.

== Manufacture and export ==
Pliny the Elder and Isidore of Seville derive the Latin word garum from the Greek γάρος (gáros), a food named by Aristophanes, Sophocles, and Aeschylus. Garos may have been a type of fish, or a fish sauce similar to garum. Pliny stated that garum was made from fish intestines, with salt, creating a liquor, the garum, and the fish paste named (h)allec or allex (similar to bagoong, this paste was a byproduct of fish sauce production). A concentrated garum evaporated down to a thick paste with salt crystals was called muria; it would have been used to salt and flavor foods.

The 10th-century Byzantine manual Geōponika (Agricultural Pursuits) includes the following recipe for liquamen:

What is called liquamen is thus made: the intestines of fish are thrown into a vessel, and are salted; and small fish, especially atherinae, or small mullets, or maenae, or lycostomi, or any small fish, are all salted in the same manner; and they are seasoned in the sun, and frequently turned; and when they have been seasoned in the heat, the garum is thus taken from them. A small basket of close texture is laid in the vessel filled with the small fish already mentioned, and the garum will flow into the basket; and they take up what has been percolated through the basket, which is called liquamen; and the remainder of the feculence is made into allec.

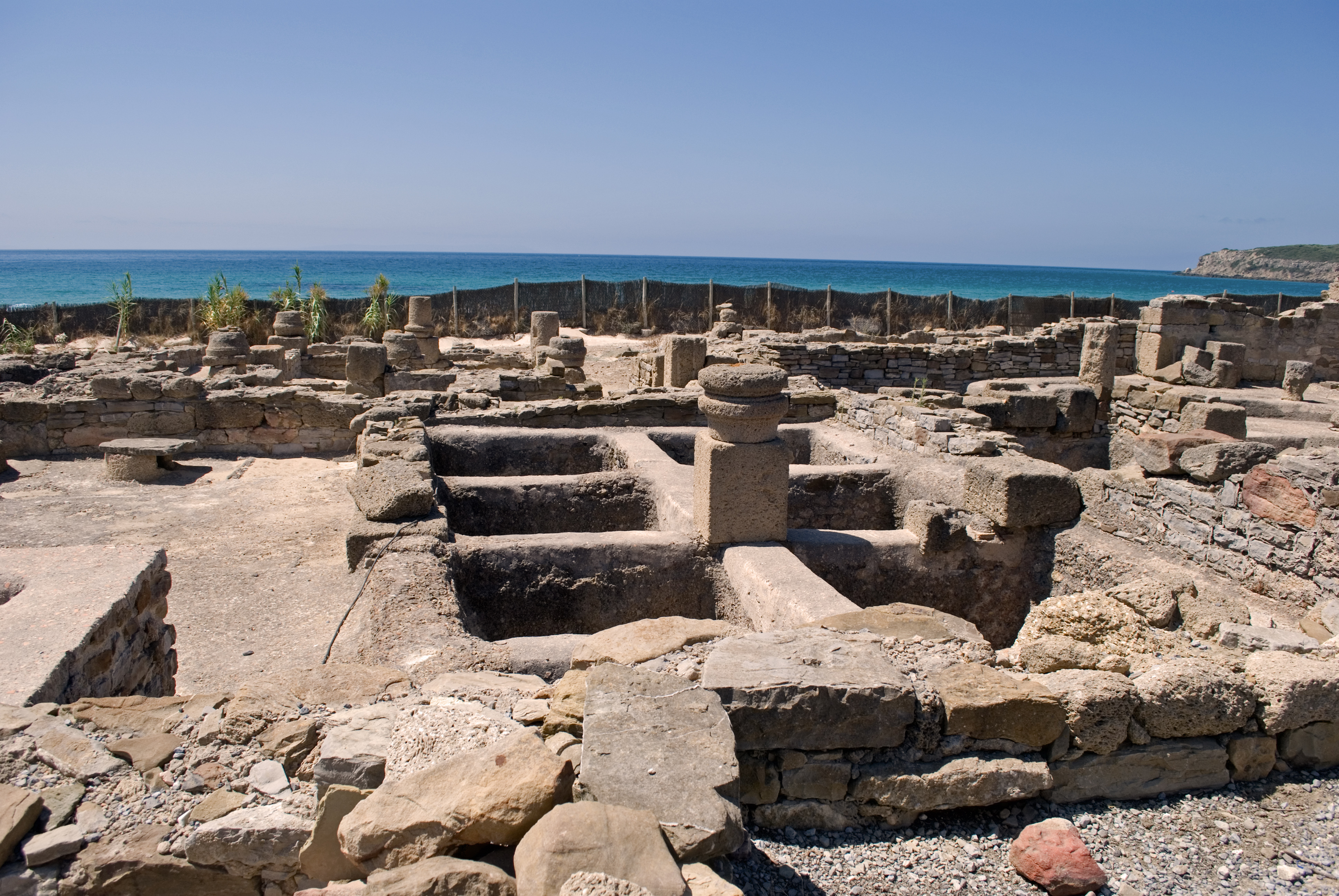
Ruins of a garum factory in Baelo Claudia in Spain

Garum was produced in various grades and consumed by all social classes. After the liquid was ladled off the top of the mixture, the remains of the fish, called allec, were used by the poorest classes to flavor their staple porridge or farinata. The finished product—the nobile garum of Martial's epigram—was apparently mild and subtle in flavor. The best garum fetched extraordinarily high prices, and salt could be substituted for it in a simpler dish. Garum appears in many recipes featured in the Roman cookbook Apicius. For example, Apicius (8.6.2–3) mentions garum being used as fish stock to flavor chopped mallow leaves fried in a skillet.

In the 1st century AD, liquamen was a sauce distinct from garum, as indicated throughout the Corpus Inscriptionum Latinarum IV. By the 5th century or earlier, however, liquamen had come to refer to garum. The available evidence suggests that the sauce was typically made by crushing the innards of (fatty) pelagic fishes—particularly anchovies, but also sprats, sardines, mackerel, or tuna—and then fermenting them in brine. In most surviving tituli picti inscribed on amphorae, where the fish ingredient is shown, the fish is mackerel. Under the best conditions, the fermentation process took about 48 hours.

The manufacture and export of garum was an element of the prosperity of coastal Greek emporia from the Ligurian coast of Gaul to the coast of Hispania Baetica, and perhaps an impetus for Roman penetration of these coastal regions. Although garum was a staple of the Roman Empire's cuisine, few production sites are known to have existed in the Eastern Mediterranean. In 2019 a small 1st-century factory was discovered near Ashkelon. A 2013 storm uncovered Neapolis, a major center of garum production, at Nabeul in Tunisia.

Pliny the Elder spoke of a type of garum that Roman Jews may have used, as normal garum may not have contained exclusively kosher seafood. In the ruins of Pompeii, jars were found containing kosher garum, suggesting an equal popularity among Jews there.

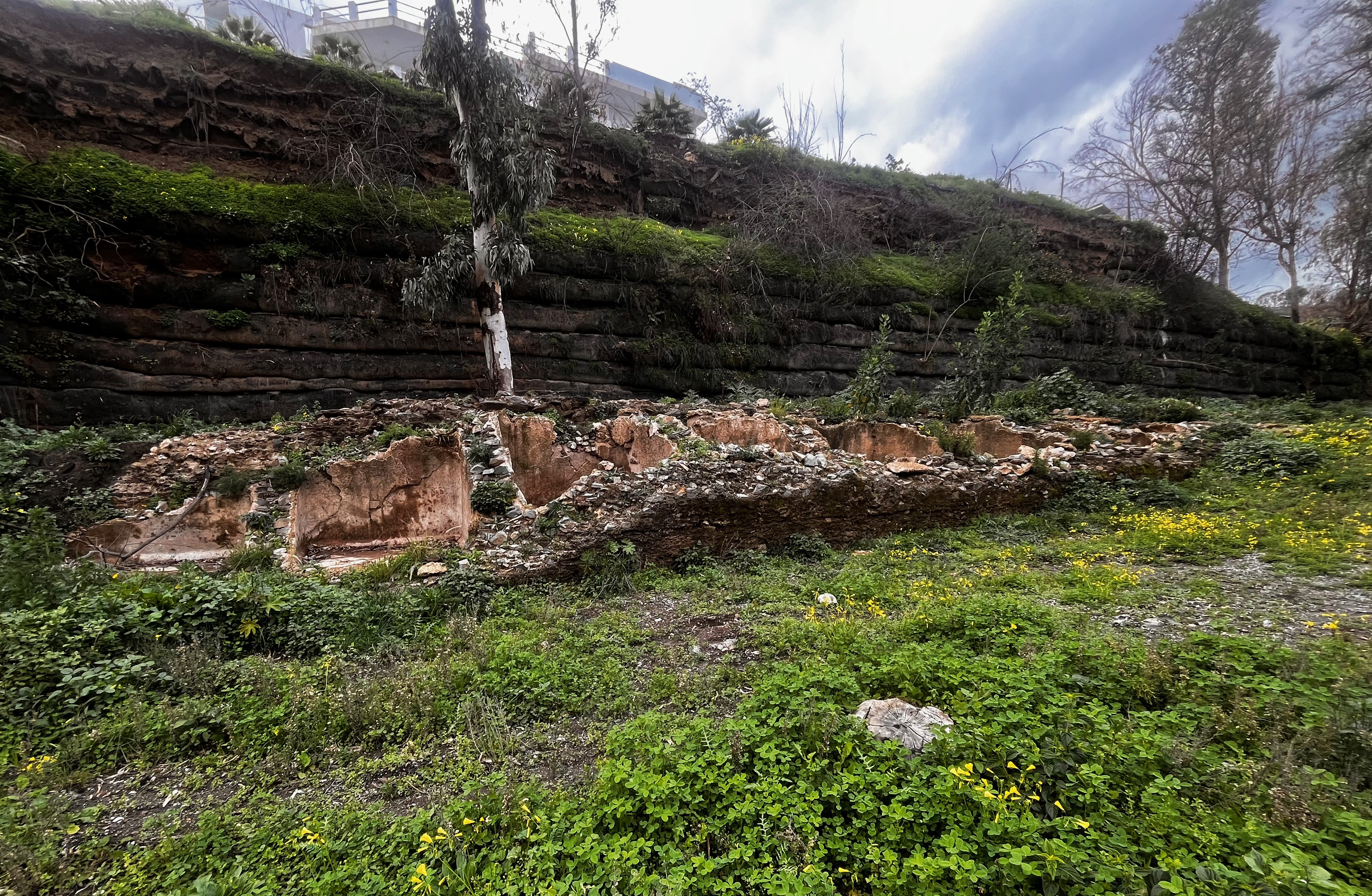
Garum factory in Benalmádena

Each port had its own traditional recipe, but by the time of Augustus, Romans considered the best to be garum from Cartagena and Gades in Baetica. This product was called garum sociorum, "garum of the allies". The ruins of a garum factory remain at the Baetian site of Baelo Claudia (in present-day Tarifa) and Carteia (San Roque). Other sites are a large garum factory at Gades (Cadiz), at Málaga under the Picasso museum, and at the Torremuelle site in Benalmádena.

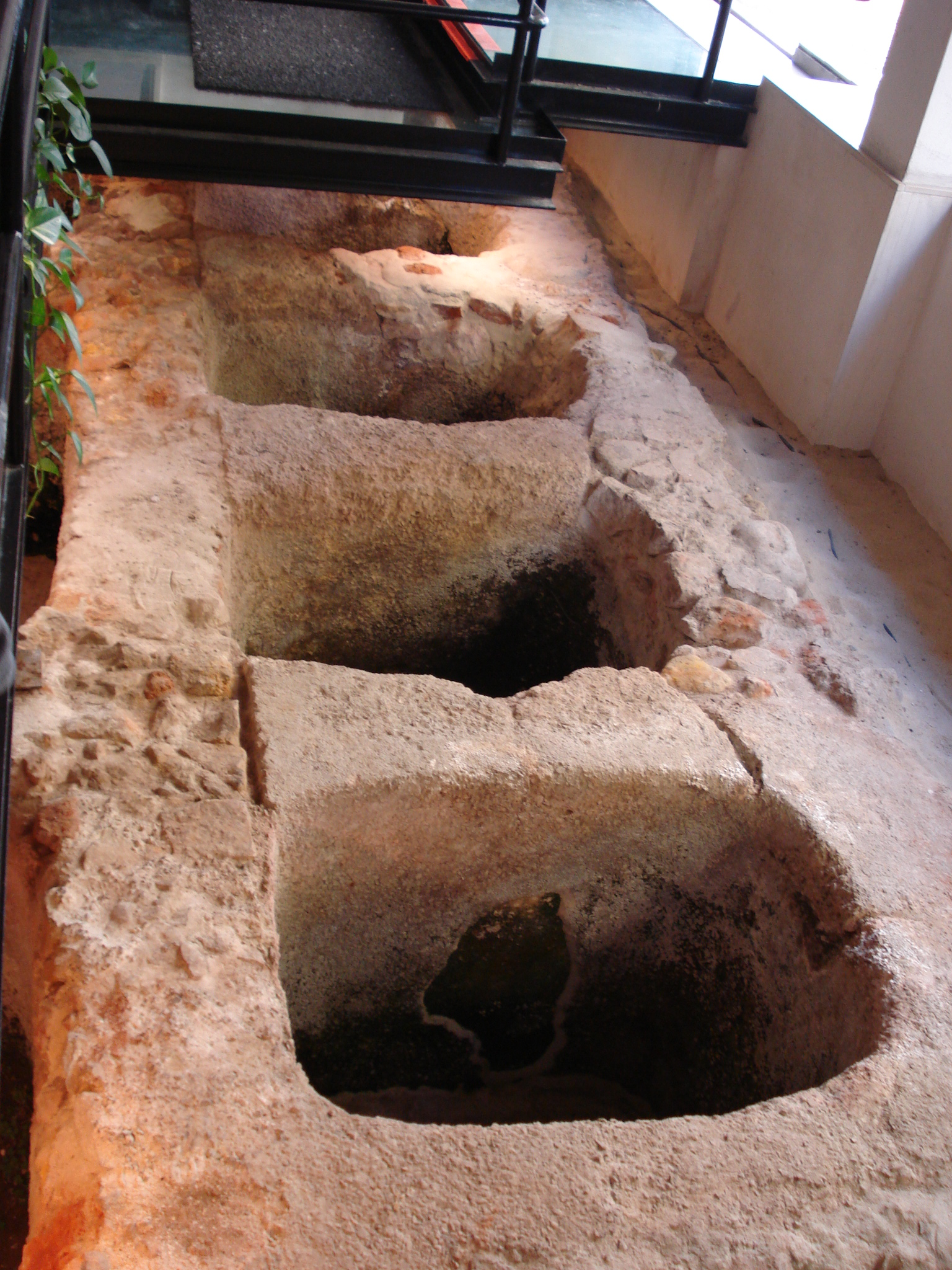
Ancient Roman garum factory in Portugal

Garum was a major export product from Hispania to Rome, and gained the towns a certain amount of prestige. The garum of Lusitania (in present-day Portugal) was also highly prized in Rome, and was shipped directly from the harbour of Lacobriga (Lagos). A former Roman garum factory can be visited in the Baixa area of central Lisbon. Fossae Marianae in southern Gaul, located on the southern tip of present-day France, served as a distribution hub for Western Europe, including Gaul, Germania, and Roman Britain. Garum factories were also located in the province of Mauretania Tingitana (modern Morocco), for example at Cotta and Lixus.

Umbricius Scaurus' production of garum was key to the economy of Pompeii. The factories where garum was produced in Pompeii have not been uncovered, perhaps indicating that they lay outside the walls of the city. The production of garum created such unpleasant smells that factories were generally relegated to the outskirts of cities. In 2008, archaeologists used the residue from garum found in containers in Pompeii to confirm the August date of the eruption of Mount Vesuvius. The garum had been made entirely of bogues, fish that congregate in the summer months.

== Cuisine ==
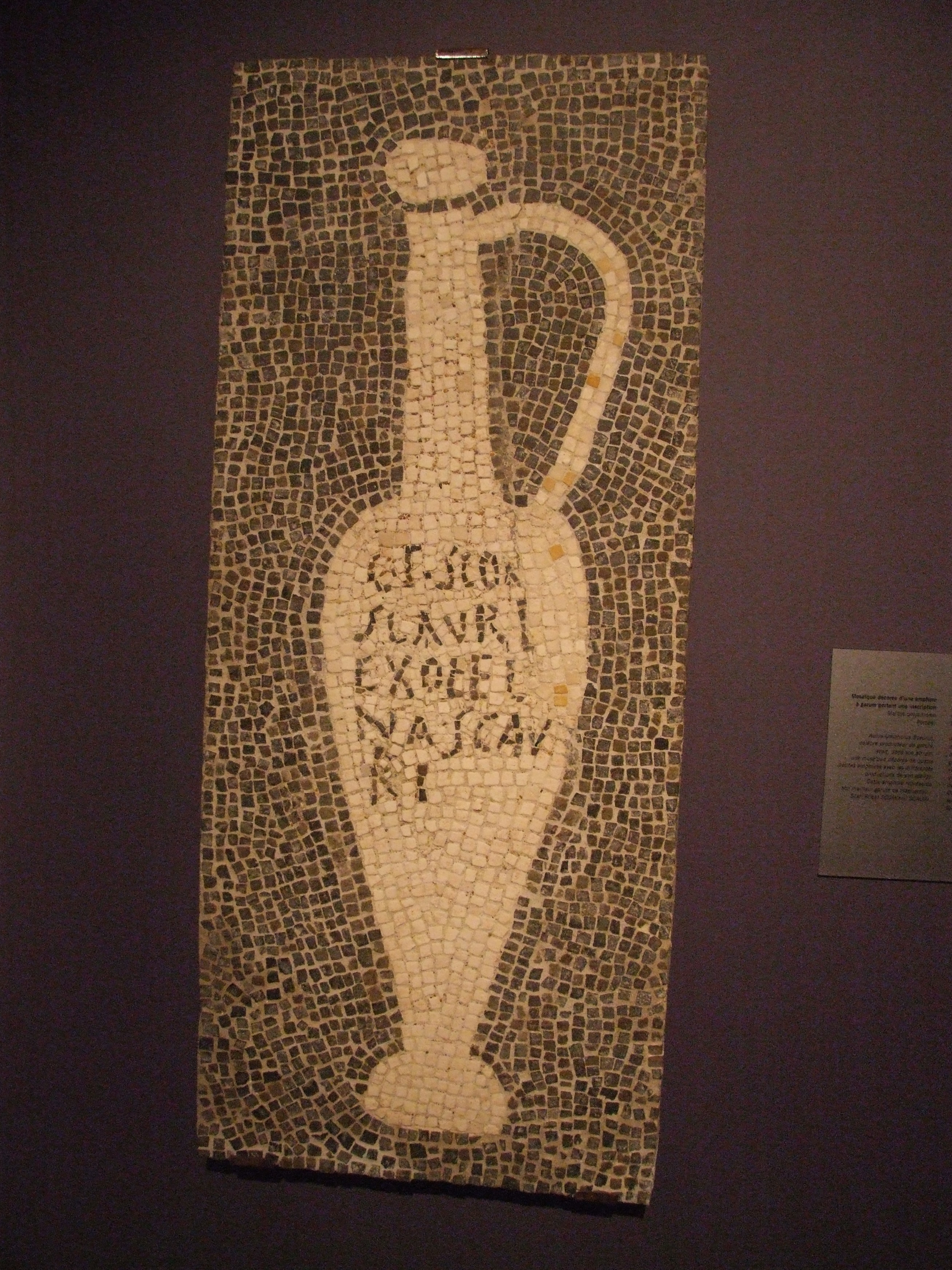
Mosaic depicting a "Flower of Garum" jug with a titulus reading "from the workshop of the garum importer Aulus Umbricius Scaurus"

When mixed with oenogarum (a popular wine-based Byzantine sauce), vinegar, black pepper, or oil, garum enhanced the flavor of a wide variety of dishes, including boiled veal and steamed mussels, even pear-and-honey soufflé. Diluted with water (hydrogarum) it was distributed to Roman legions. Pliny (d. 79) remarked in his Natural History that it could be diluted to the colour of honey wine and drunk.

== Social aspects ==
Garum had a social dimension that might be compared to that of garlic in some modern Western societies, or to the adoption of fish sauce in Vietnamese cuisine (called nước mắm there). Seneca, holding the old-fashioned line against the expensive craze, cautioned against it, even though his family was from Baetian Corduba:

Do you not realize that garum sociorum, that expensive bloody mass of decayed fish, consumes the stomach with its salted putrefaction?

— Seneca, Epistle 95.

A surviving fragment of Plato Comicus speaks of "putrid garum". Martial congratulates a friend on keeping up amorous advances to a girl who had indulged in six helpings of it.

The biological anthropologist Piers Mitchell suggests that garum may have helped spread fish tapeworms across Europe.

== As medicine ==
Garum was also employed as a medicine. It was thought to be one of the best cures for many ailments, including dog bites, dysentery, and ulcers, and to ease chronic diarrhea and treat constipation. Garum was even used as an ingredient in cosmetics and for removal of unwanted hair and freckles.

== Legacy ==
Garum remains of interest to food historians and chefs, and has been reintroduced into modern food preparation. In Cádiz, Spain, in 2017, one chef used its flavors for a fish salad recipe, after Spanish archaeologists found evidence of garum in amphorae recovered in the ruins of Pompeii, dating to 79 AD.

Garum is believed to be the ancestor of the fermented anchovy sauce colatura di alici, still produced in Campania, Italy, as well as the fermented anchovy and sardine paste pissalat in the Nice region, France.

== See also ==
- List of ancient dishes
- List of fish sauces
- Fermented fish
- Other historic sauces:
  - Cameline sauce
  - Chawdron
  - Galantine
  - Murri (condiment)
