= Murri (condiment) =

Arabian condiment

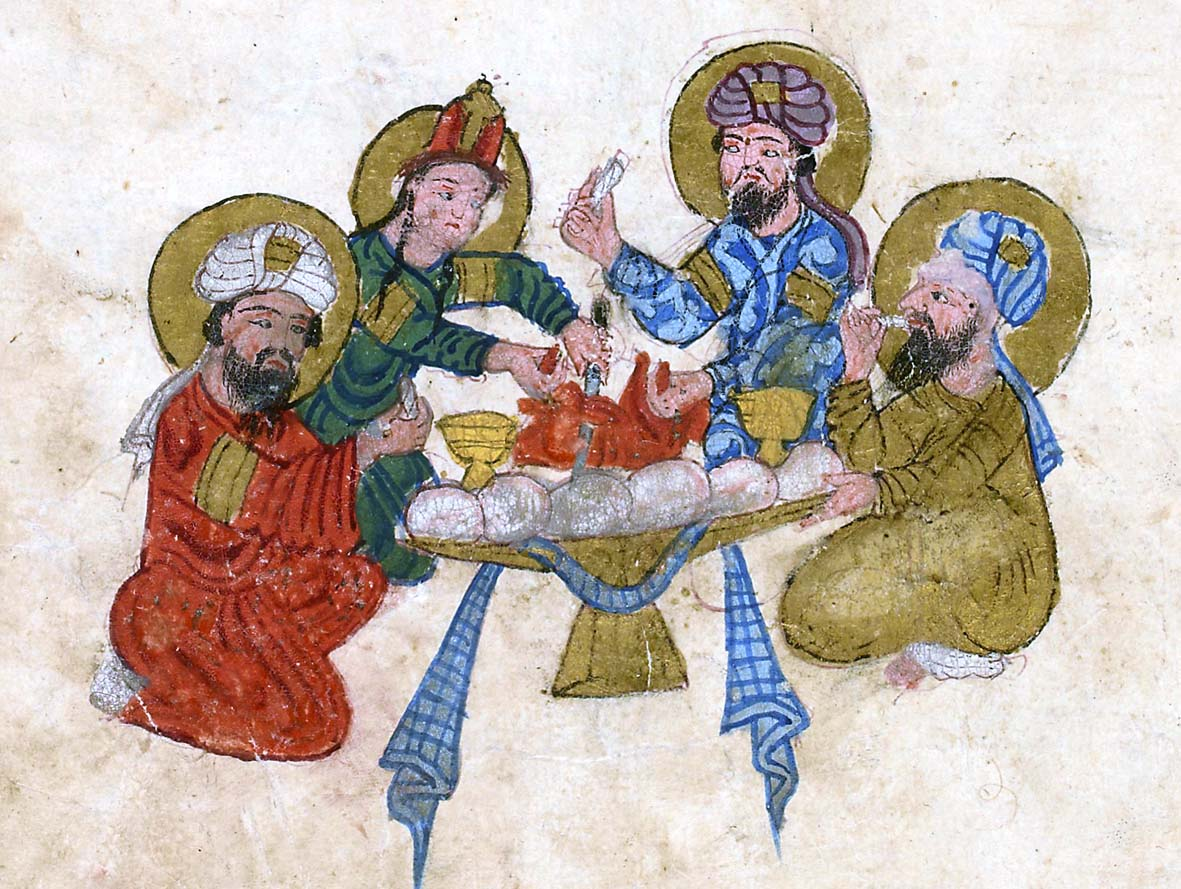
Medieval art showing people eating, potentially with murri

Murrī or almorí (in Andalusia) was a liquid condiment made using a fermented solid-state starter called budhaj that was made with barley flour or wheat flour, known from Maghrebi and Arab cuisines. Almost every substantial dish in medieval Arab cuisine used murrī in small quantities. It could be used as a substitute for salt or sumac, and has been compared to soy sauce by Rudolf Grewe, Charles Perry, and others due to its high glutamates content and resultant umami flavor.

== History ==
There are two types of murri known from historical recipes that have survived into the present day. The Iraqi-style murri from the 10th century Kitab al-Tabikh by Ibn Sayyar al-Warraq and the 13th century Kitab Wasf al-Atima al-Mutada was made by wetting a combination of ground flatbread, barley flour (budhaj flour) and salt and allowing it to ferment. The Maghrebi style of murri described in detail in Kitab Wasf is made only with barley flour, and flavored with carob, fennel stems, citron, pine nuts, mixed spices and bitter orange wood. The consistency is similar to treacle. Kitab Wasf also describes a "Byzantine murri", but it is made with toasted bread instead of spoiled bread and includes caramelized honey.

The authors of some Arabic lexicographical texts wrote that murri may be a word of foreign origin, and based on this, some modern scholars have speculated that the word could be derived from the Greek halmyris ('a salty thing' and source for the Latin word for brine, salmuria) and the condiment related to the Ancient Roman condiment garum (or garos in Greek). Although murri is not made with fish, the Arabic translation of Artemidorus' Oneirocritica uses garos for murri. While calling this "a translator's 'bright idea'", Charles Perry, an expert in medieval Arab cuisine, notes that both condiments do share the traits of being fermented, salty liquid seasonings, but it is unknown whether the technique or culinary use of a fermented sauce is of Greek origin. Perry writes that murri may represent "the Greek idea of a salty liquid seasoning as interpreted in the basically Persianized—and fish poor—Near Eastern environment," but cautions that this interpretation has some problems, including recorded recipes of a distinct "Byzantine murri". David Waines, a British scholar of Islamic history, has written that there are two types of murri, "the more usual made from barley flour, and the other from fish." He further explains:

There has been much confusion over the exact nature of murri, the prevalent view being that it derived from the Roman garum, a fish preparation. In fact the most common form to which the recipes refer is murri naqi made from cereal grain.

The recipe for murrī was mistranscribed with the fermenting stage omitted, in a 13th-century text Liber de Ferculis et Condimenti, where it was described as "salty water" elsewhere in the translation.

== Preparation ==
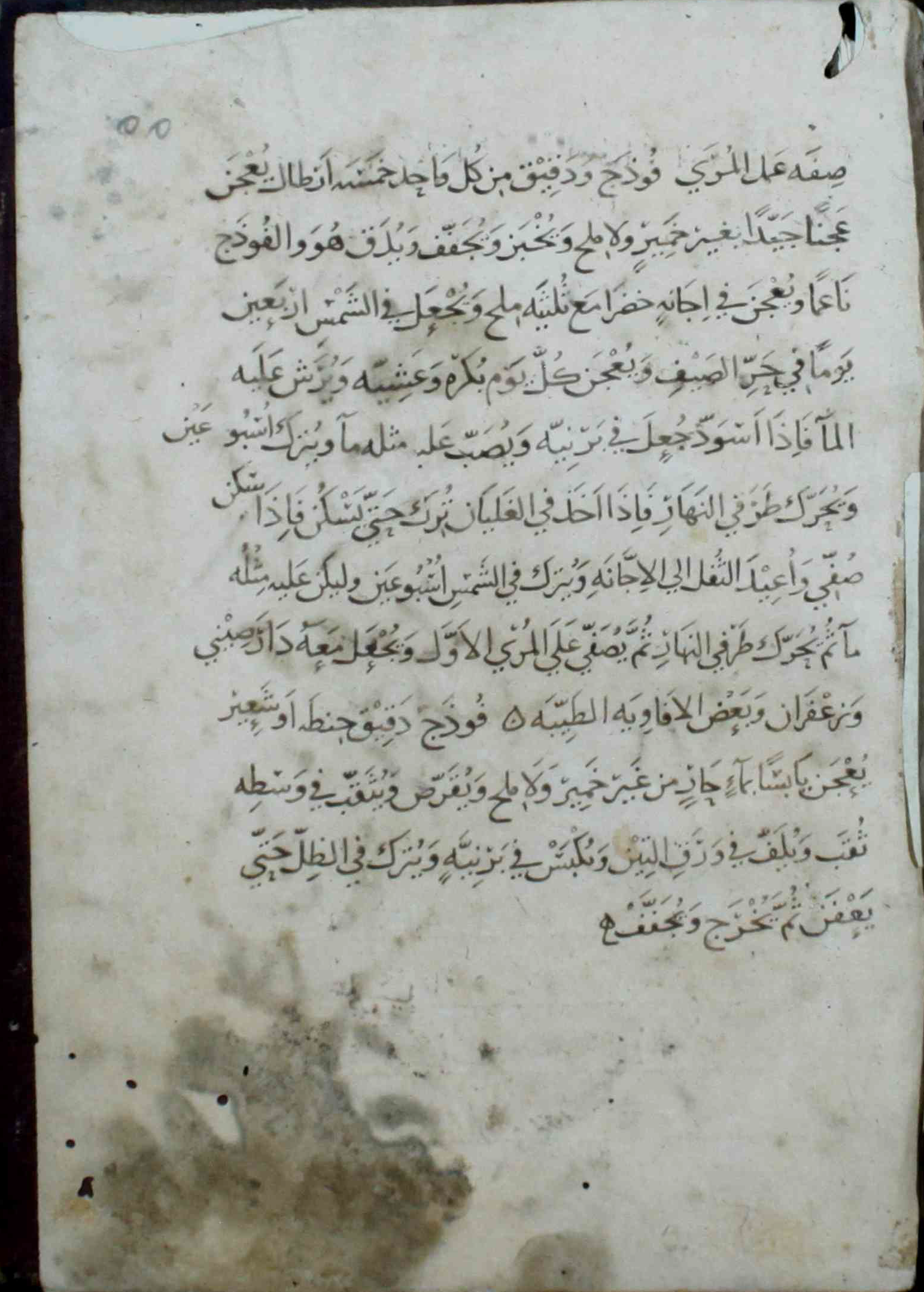
Murri recipe from Kitab al-Tabikh by al-Baghdadi. MS Ayasofya 3710.

Traditionally, murrī production was undertaken annually in households at the end of March and continued over a period of 90 days. The first step in the process involved creating a fermented starter called budhaj or budhaq. This entailed mixing water and raw barley to form a dough, then wrapping the dough in fig leaves which are left to sit for 40 days. During this time a variety of different surface molds, bacteria, yeasts, and microorganisms ferment within the dough cake. The dough is then left to dry, ground and mixed with water, salt, and usually additional flour. It is then left to ferment for another 40 days in a warm place. The resulting dark mahogany brown paste, mixed with water to form a liquid, is murrī.

A fast method for preparing murrī is to mix 2 parts barley flour to one part salt and make a loaf that is baked in the oven until hard and then pounded into crumbs to soak in water for a day and a night. This mixture, known as the first murri, is then strained and set aside. Then, raisins, carob, dill, fennel, nigella, sesame, anise, mace, citron leaf, and pine seed milk are boiled with water and strained. The second murri is then added to the first, and boiled until thickened.

Murrī mixed with milk was known as kamakh.

== See also ==
- Soy sauce
- Other historical sauces:
  - Cameline sauce
  - Garum

== Bibliography ==
- Davidson, Alan; Saberi, Helen; McGee, Harold (2002), The Wilder Shores of Gastronomy: Twenty Years of the Best Food Writing from the Journal Petits Propos Culinaires (Illustrated ed.), Ten Speed Press, ISBN 9781580084178
- Davis, Ralph Henry Carless; Mayr-Harting, Henry; Moore, Robert Ian (1985), Studies in medieval history presented to R.H.C. Davis (Illustrated ed.), Continuum International Publishing Group, ISBN 9780907628682
- Jayyusi, Salma Khadra; Marín, Manuela (1992), The Legacy of Muslim Spain (2nd, illustrated ed.), BRILL, ISBN 9789004095991
- David Martin Gitlitz, Linda Kay Davidson, A drizzle of honey: the lives and recipes of Spain's secret Jews, 1999. ISBN 0-312-19860-4. p. 20.
