= Aulus Umbricius Scaurus =

Roman garum manufacturer-merchant

Aulus Umbricis Scaurus was a Pompeiian manufacturer-merchant, known for the production of garum and liquamen (types of fermented fish sauce), a staple of Roman cuisine. He was active in Pompeii between c. 25-35 CE and 79 CE. Scholars believe that A. Umbricius Scaurus was Pompeii's leading fish sauce manufacturer. His products were traded across the Mediterranean in the first century.

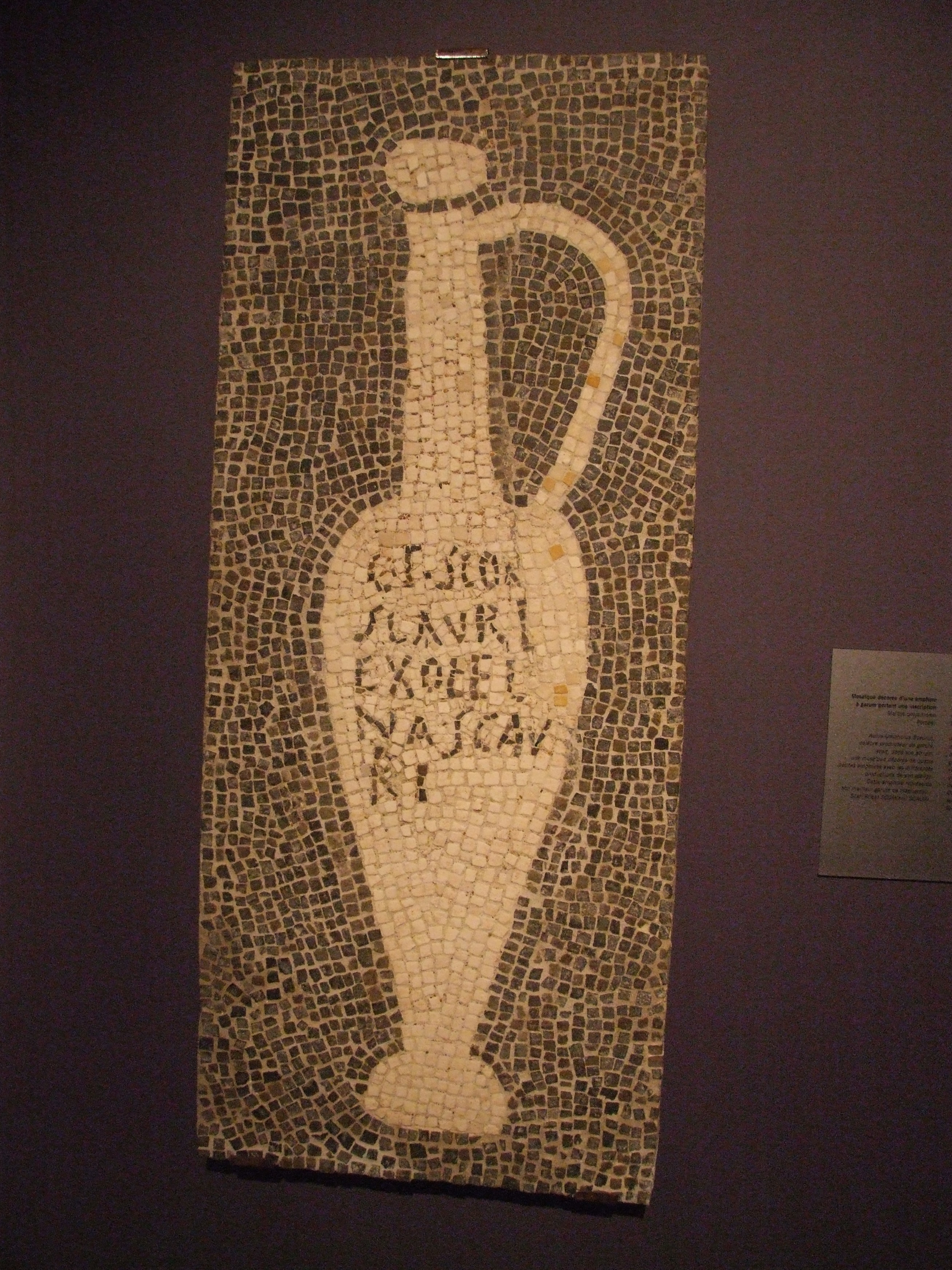
Mosaic depicting a "Flower of Garum" jug with a titulus reading "from the workshop of [the garum importer Aulus Umbricius] Scaurus"

== Life and times ==
More is known about A. Umbricius Scaurus than most first century individuals because archaeologists have identified his Pompeiian residence and his family tomb. In addition, examples of urcei (small single-handed transport vessels) bearing his manufacturer's mark and labeling have been uncovered at various sites across the Mediterranean. Based on these findings, scholars have been able to make inferences about Scaurus’ status within the community, his networks of relationships, his personal wealth, as well as the production methods employed in manufacturing garum.

Aulus Umbricius Scaurus’ date of birth is not known and very little is known about his origins. The available evidence suggests that his family were not prominent in Pompeii prior to the first century BCE, yet he became a wealthy merchant by the early to mid-first century CE and his son rose to high office. One theory, for which there is some, albeit meagre, evidence, is that the family Umbricii were involved in producing ceramics, but with the decline of agriculture in the late Roman Republic, shifted their interests to the production of garum in Pompeii. His date of death is unknown, but he probably died in the eruption of Mount Vesuvius in 79 AD.

As a merchant, Scaurus was active for approximately 50 years, from c. 25-35 CE to 79 CE. He manufactured liquamen and garum; types of fermented sauce, typically made from mackerel. The terms liquamen and garum were used interchangeably at varying intervals, sometimes referring to the same products; at other times, they referred to separate manufactures. The precise application of the terms is not elucidated by Scaurus' creations. Scaurus may have produced liquamen and garum at different quality levels, with flos liquamen and flos garum both among his known products.

Scaurus’ name (or the name of one of his slaves or freemen) appears on almost one third of all fish sauce jars found in Pompeii and Herculaneum, suggesting that he was the leading manufacturer of the day. Across the Mediterranean, fish sauce produced in Pompeii was generally regarded as a high quality product. Pliny the Elder praised the superiority of Pompeiian fish sauce.

Scaurus owned his own retail shop, and controlled six or more other shops which were managed by his family members, slaves or freedmen. Labels found on pottery reveal that members of his household managed separate shops. Named individuals include: freedmen, Umbricius Abascantus and Umbricius Agathopus; freedwoman, Umbricia Fortunata and a slave, Eutyche.

Certain archaeological evidence points to Scaurus’ activities as an importer and exporter. Examples of Scaurus’ product have been uncovered as far away as modern France. His mark also appears on jars of garum originating from southern Spain, suggesting that he imported product for local sale.

Evidence for Scaurus’ wealth and status can be found in the size of his house and the inscriptions in his family tomb. His house, situated near Porta Marina, consisted of an upper level with three atria; several cubicula and a fishpond and a lower level with cubicula, storerooms and a private bath. This building has been positively identified as belonging to Umbricius Scaurus due to the large floor mosaic bearing titulus pictus on each corner, depicting urcei (urns) of liquamen and garum inscribed with his name. Elsewhere in the house, urcei with labels boasting of the quality his produce were uncovered. The villa, with its harbour views, colonnaded garden and private bath, has been described as “luxurious”.

The floor mosaic, dated to around 25-35 BCE, depicts four different amphora, one at each corner of the atrium, and bearing labels as follows: 1. G(ari) F(los) SCO[m]/ SCAURI/ EX OFFI[ci]/NA SCAU/RI (translated as: "The flower of garum, made of the mackerel, a product of Scaurus, from the shop of Scaurus") 2. LIQU[minis]/ FLOS (translated as: "The flower of Liquamen") 3. G[ari] F[los] SCOM[bri]/ SCAURI (translated as: "The flower of garum, made of the mackerel, a product of Scaurus") 4. LIQUAMEN/ OPTIMUM/ EX OFFICI[n]/A SCAURI (translated as: "The best liquamen, from the shop of Scaurus")

Situated in the entrance hall, the expansive floor mosaic was clearly designed to impress guests with a display of Scaurus’ wealth and business success. Curtis has described this mosaic as "an advertisement... and a rare, unequivocal example of a motif inspired by a patron, rather than by the artist."

Umbricius Scaurus is one of the rare Pompeiians for whom both house and tomb have been identified. The family tomb, situated in the Street of Tombs, consists of an altar bearing a decorated stucco relief in memory of Aulus Umbricius, a senior town official, erected by his father, Scaurus Umbricius. The sepulchral inscription, dated to around 74-75 CE, notes that the City contributed to funeral costs and burial plot:

A(ulo) Umbricio A(uli) f(ilio) Men(enia)
Scauro
IIvir(o) i(ure) d(icundo)
huic decuriones locum monum(entum)
et HS |(mille)|(mille) in funere et statuam equestr(em)
[in f]oro ponendam censuerunt
Scaurus pater filio [CIL X 1024]

The commonly accepted translation of this inscription, first provided by Mau, is:

To the memory of Aulus Umbricius Scaurus son of Aulus, of the tribe Menenia, duoviri (or duomvir) with judiciary authority.
The city council voted the place for a monument to this man and two thousand sesterces toward the cost of the funeral;
They voted also that an equestrian statue in his honour should be set up in the Forum.
Scaurus the father to the memory of his son.

That the City Council was willing to contribute to funeral costs and erect an equestrian statue in the forum attests to the achievements of Scaurus’ son. He had been elected to one of the highest political positions, duoviri (one of only two men to hold the title), a prestigious position in the town.

== See also ==
- Garum
- List of fish sauces
- Umbricia Fortunata, thought to be a freedwoman in the employ of Scaurus.
