= Lixus (ancient city) =

Roman/Berber/Punic city in Morocco

- ليكسوس (Arabic)
- Choumis / Tchoumis / Choumich
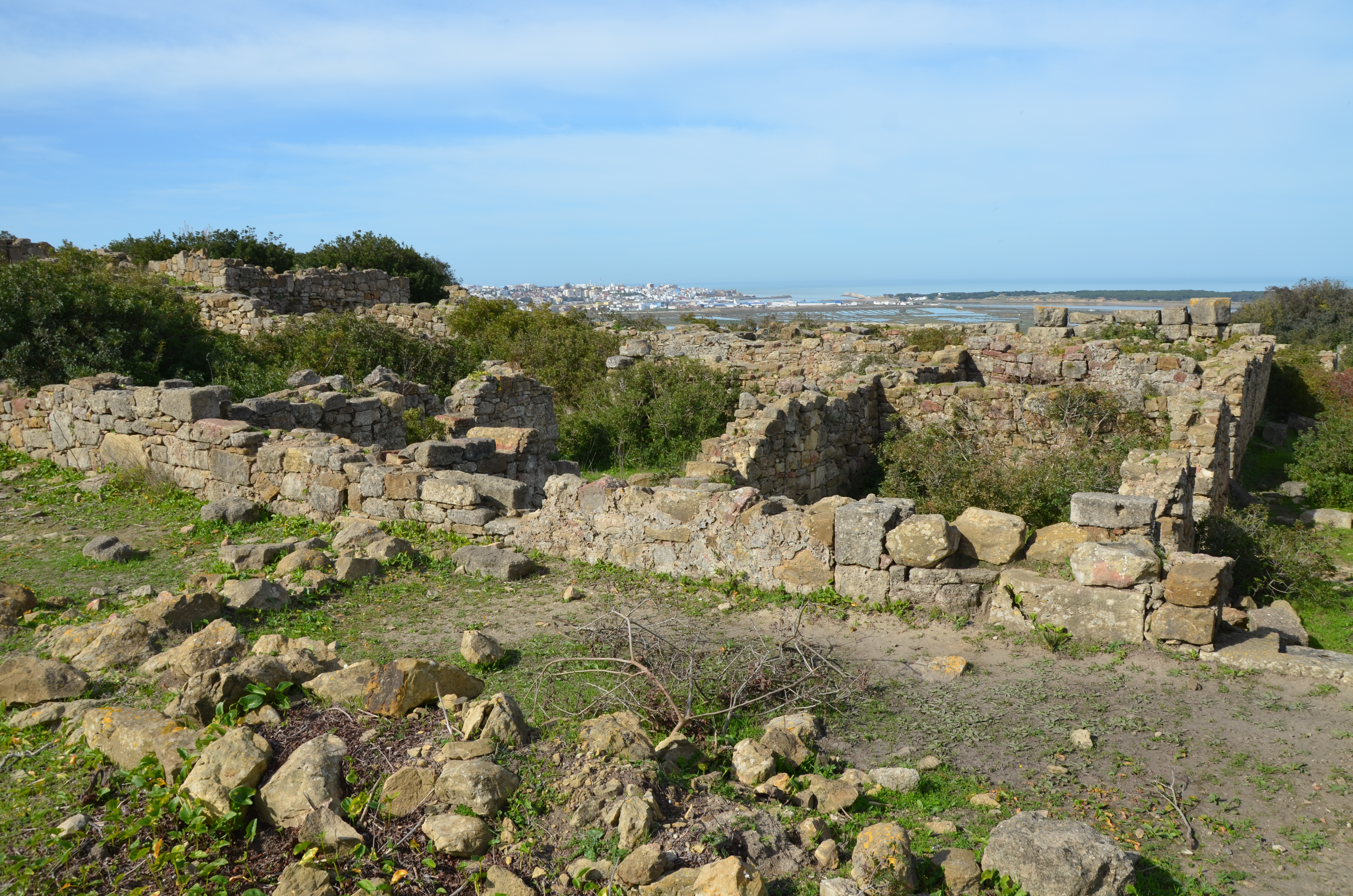
- Location of Lixus
- 35°12′3″N 06°05′55″W
- Type: Settlement
- Periods: Phoenician, Punic-Mauretanian, Roman
- Location: Larache, Larache Province, Tanger-Tetouan-Al Hoceima, Morocco
- Region: Morocco

History
- Built: 7th century BC

UNESCO World Heritage Site
- Official name: Archaeological site of Lixus (Tentative)
- Type: Cultural
- Criteria: ii, iii, iv
- Added to Tentative List: 1995
- Region: North African States

Lixus (Phoenician: 𐤋𐤊𐤅𐤔) is an ancient city developed by Phoenicians (8th–7th century BC) over a pre-existing Bronze Age settlement, before the city of Carthage. Its distinguishing feature is that it was continuously occupied from antiquity to the Islamic Era, and has ruins dating to the Phoenician (8th–6th centuries BC), Punic (5th–3rd centuries BC), Mauretanian (2nd century BC–AD 50), Roman (AD 50–6th century AD) and Islamic (12th–15th centuries AD) periods.

== Tentative World Heritage Status ==
Lixus was submitted to the UNESCO World Heritage on July 1, 1995, by the Ministry of Culture of Morocco, on the basis of three cultural selection criteria. In a 2019 press release, the Ministry of Culture stated that it was implementing a cultural and economic development strategy, with the intent on working towards Lixus being officially listed as a UNESCO World Heritage Site.

== Geography ==
The archaeological site of Lixus is located in Morocco northeast of Larache city (70 km (43 mi) south of Tangier) on the right bank of the Loukkos river, 4 km (2.5 mi) from the coast. Lixus was built on a hill of 80 metres (260 ft) above sea level, and covers 70 hectares (170 acres), it dominates the Atlantic shore and the valley formed by the Loukkos. It is surrounded by marshy plains to the south and southwest, in which salt factories have been created. It was added to the UNESCO World Heritage tentative list on July 1, 1995, in the cultural category.

== Name ==
The official language was Punic, used on the city's autonomous currency issues from the 2nd century BC, the name of the site appears on coins in Punic as the triliteral LKS, and in Latin as LIX and LIXS (The Lixus / Lixos form is consecrated by the Greco-Latin tradition).

== Legends ==
Such a far-away place was subject of myths, the garden of the Hesperides with the golden apples and the palace of Antaeus were said to have been here. By its vestiges the archaeological site reminds us of a long phase of the ancient history of the country, it also reminds us of thousands years old legends about Okeanus the Roman ocean god, Hercules and the three golden apples, the legendary fight of Hercules and Antaeus, Theseus slaying the Minotaur, and about Hercules separating Africa from Europe. Pliny the Elder reports several «fabulous tales»: «Here was the royal palace of Antaeus, his fight with Hercules and the gardens of the Hesperides were here ..... Hercules had to enter to this garden to steal the golden apples; the entrance was guarded by a dragon....» Pliny saw in this dragon an allegory of the river described by many meanders.

== History ==
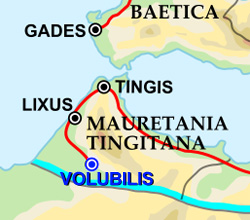
Map of Mauretania Tingitana showing the location of Lixus

Prior to Phoenician contact, the hill of Tchoummich and the surrounding Loukkos River valley were inhabited by Berber populations, identified in classical sources such as the Periplus of Hanno as the Lixitae. Archaeological excavations at Lixus have revealed pre-Phoenician Late Bronze Age occupation layers featuring local hand-made ceramics, megalithic structures, and bronze tools.

Phoenicians first settled in Lixus in the 8th or 7th centuries BC and the city had become part of a chain of Phoenician cities along the Atlantic coast of ancient Morocco; other major settlements further to the south are Chellah (called Sala Colonia by the Romans) and Mogador. When Carthage's empire fell to Rome during the Punic Wars, Lixus, Chellah, and Mogador became outposts of the province of Mauretania Tingitana.

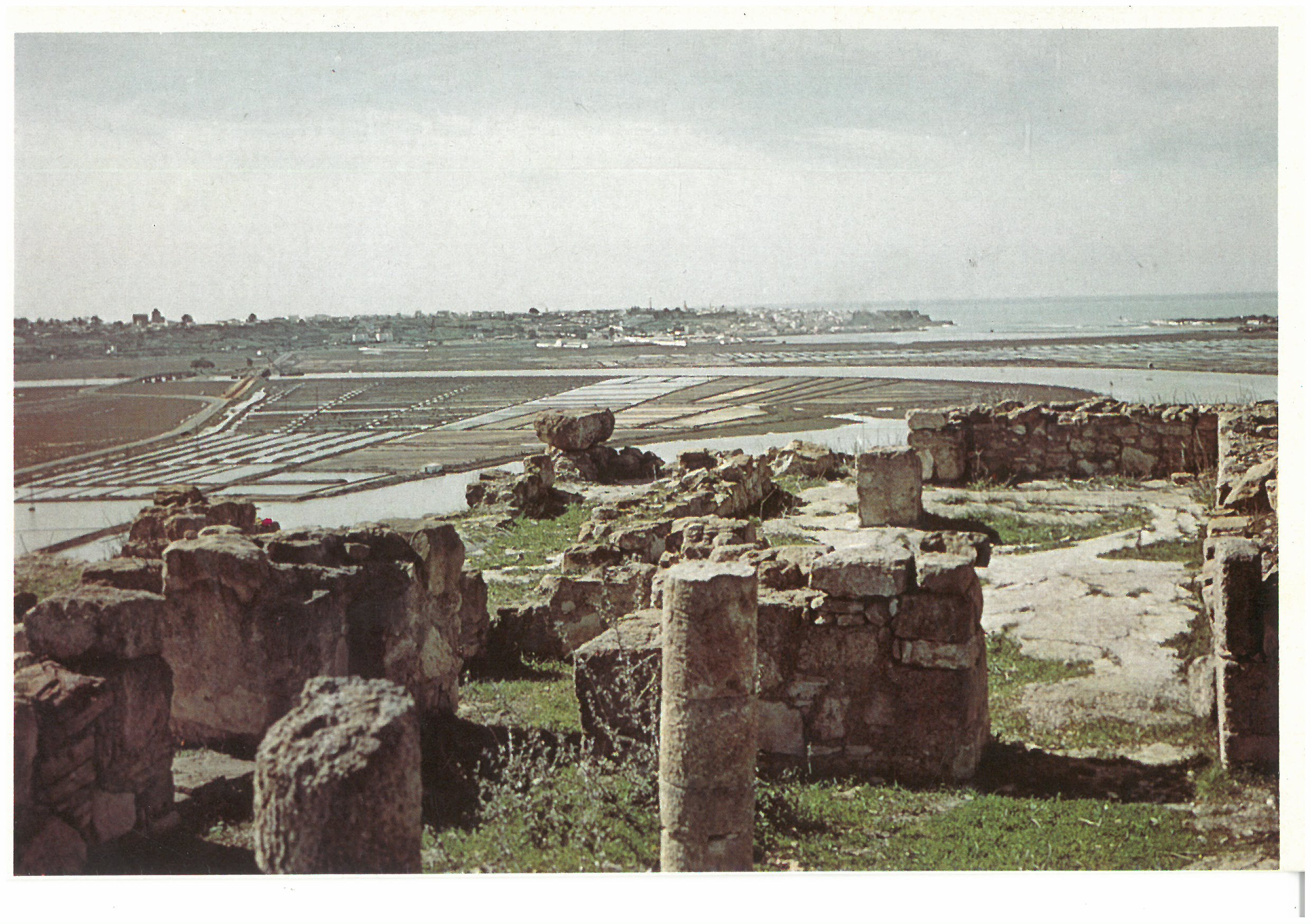
Archaeological site of Lixus showing ruins, salt factories, and Larache in the background

Lixus retained its strategic importance, especially under Juba II and his son Ptolemy of Mauretania. Its industrial complex was created during the reign of Juba II. Fishing and viticulture were the city's main economic resources, which can be inferred from the bunches of grapes and tuna that adorned their coins. The port of Lixus played an important role in Atlantic trade as the hill of Tchoummich corresponds perfectly to the conditions sought by the Phoenician sailors, whose economic activities were closely linked to the sea.

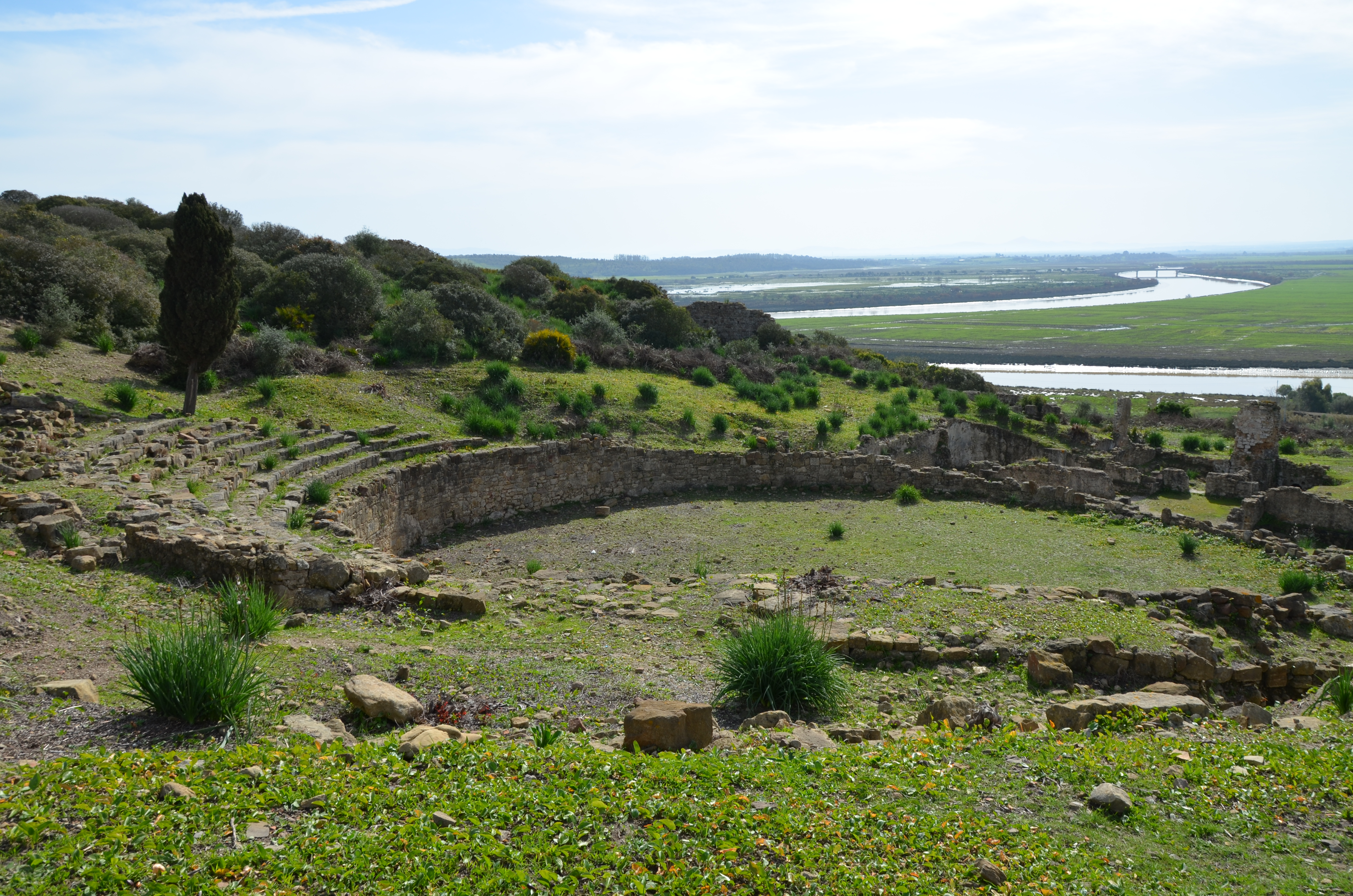
The Roman amphitheater in Lixus

The last of the Moorish kings was assassinated by the Roman emperor Caligula around 40 AD. From then on, Lixus would become part of the Roman Empire, more precisely the province of Mauretania Tingitania. By the third century, Lixus became almost fully Christian and there are even now the ruins of a Paleochristian church overlooking the archaeological area.

Lixus became a colony under Claudius (50 AD) and it retains an amphitheater and a forum from that period. The city would retain this status until the beginning of the 5th century. With the arrival of the Romans, the city acquired new administrative, social, religious, and economic structures. During the Roman period, the city maintained its commercial vitality, thanks to fishing and salt factories. This economic development fueled an important urban and architectural evolution.

Lixus reached its maximum extent of more than 60 hectares between 50 and 150 AD and became the largest city of Tingitane. According to the first excavators, this prosperity appears to have waned from the second half of the 3rd century. In the 4th century, the agglomeration folded in on itself.

== Excavations ==
Lixus has been a subject of excavations since 1948. This archaeological site was composed of complex quarters with entangled buildings from various periods, whose study allows for the examination of the evolution and chronology of the city. One example is the area of temples, the largest excavated area of the site (165 m east–west by 250 m north–south). Thanks to excavations undertaken from 1999 to 2001 by a Moroccan-French team it was possible to reconsider the evolution of the "Temples quarter", even if the excavated zones constitute approximately only 20% of the total surface of the site.

== Evolution of the "Temples quarter" ==
Based on several references, the evolutionary scheme of this quarter can be divided into 5 major phases, which correspond to 5 historical periods each marked by special and distinctive architectural features.

=== Phoenician period (8th-first half-century to 7th century BC) ===
The first Phoenician structures of the sector correspond to two structures A and L:

- Building A orientated east–west, obliterated by later constructions, retains only a few sections of regular walls made of quadrangular stones and megalithic blocks. The excavations, undertaken in the immediate vicinity, have revealed synchronous archaeological material dating from the Phoenician period (8th-first half of the 7th century BC).
- Remains of the L structure have a rectangular shape; they were discovered in 2000 under building K. The corresponding artifacts, including a large amount of modeled ceramic associated with red slip ceramic, also belong to the Phoenician period.

In the north, researchers have found an L-shaped structure dating from the pre-Augustan period, it is a Cryptoporticus (40 m (130 ft) long, 6 m (20 ft) wide) with a central axis with columns supporting an upper platform. These remains could be a piazza structure, or a large sanctuary, with a temple in the center. On the ground floor, there are remains of a storage space, and an area with a garden closed off by a wing. It is probable that this sanctuary was Phoenician in origin. In the South-west of the quarter, under the courtyard of the «annexes» of building F, an archaeological survey showed a level of Phoenician ceramics characterized by a strong presence of red slip, Pithoi, and jugs of the Cruz de Negro type.

=== Punic-Mauritanian period (4th century to 3rd century BC) ===
After the Second Punic War, Mauretania was ruled by kings and the role and importance of fish products from the straits in international trade increased. The numerous fragments of amphorae, intended specifically for packaging fish products, indicate that the city exported much of its catch.

The Punico-Mauritanian phase is stratigraphically represented by residual furniture dating from the 4th to 3rd century BC. Stratigraphic layers under building G contain fragments of Attic ceramics and amphoric material which attest that the area was occupied by locals during this period. In the west, the excavations located in building E, have allowed the obtainment of a fragment, dating from the second half of the 1st century BC.

The southwestern side of the so-called "Temples quarter" is known as the ‘Montalban chambers’. Changes in the internal layout of those buildings were made around 30 BC. This included the opening of new windows and doors with voussoir arches in the southern wall. This is an example of the general refurbishment and maintenance work of an urban project at the complex. Before the 1st century BC the city had an open space covering up to 4,000m², arranged on three terraces with a double cistern, as indicated by pottery founded from this phase.

=== Mauritanian period (3rd century to 2nd century BC) ===
Researchers have found that the Mauritanian phase can be subdivided into two phases:

- Phase 1: is characterized by the emergence of a real neighborhood probably composed of houses, a cistern, and buildings K, E, B, and C. East–west oriented, this set of structures was surrounded by an enclosure. Surveys carried out in those different buildings allow us to date this phase from the first half of the 1st century BC.
- Phase 2: Saw the addition of the building commonly called H and the pre-thermal building J, dating back to the time of Augustus or Juba II.

The excavations have identified two rooms, E, elongated of a few m^{2} located in the south-east of the sector. They have doors on the west side, leaving space for a passageway behind the walls. The rooms are preceded by a vestibule and a staircase of building D. The chambers were built gradually, in several stages during the pre-Augustan period; they would have supported an upper story, and they were then incorporated into the new early Augustan complex.

A Mauretanian storehouse was found at the western limit of the ‘"Sacred gardens", the new structure that covered the storehouses. It formed the southern facade of a new monumental area called the «Western wing» (28m width by 100 m length).

In the eastern sector, researchers have found buildings that might be interpreted as places of worship with a rectangular floor plan (C, A, D, B). Building C (12.7 m × 10.5 m [42 ft × 34 ft]) has a podium in opus quadratum and an almost square cella with double doors, building D has superimposed floors in opus signinum with marble. Their location, in the upper part of the urban area, and with an open area in front of them, supports the proposal that they were temples without substantial buildings laid out behind them.

Buildings F, G, and H were structures with porticoes and apses and that the movement between them was fluent thanks to various doors. The religious buildings in the east of the site were probably temples and they remained in use even after the Augustan renovation of the quarter.

Under the portico of building F, there is a cistern (9.5m long and 3m deep) that dates to after the annexation of Mauretania in 43 AD. It may have been related to a channel located slightly to the southern side.

Indeed, The area with the sanctuary, gardens, and some storehouses, which was built in the Mauretanian phase, was replaced by a palatial residence of Juba II of Mauretania covering 7,000 m^{2} (75,000 sq ft). This residence was larger than the ‘Palace of Gordianus’ in Volubilis, which covered only 4,554 m^{2} (49,020 sq ft).

The ‘Palace of Juba II’, was on the upper slope of the south side of the «Choumich» hill,., it took full advantage of the panoramic possibilities of its position, it used architectural elements such as apses or semicircular porticoes, in combination with large windows and triple doors. It shows a splendid use of ambiguity between covered spaces (halls and exedrae), porticoes, gardens, and the landscape.

There are some peculiarities of the palace in Lixus: The architect extended the spaces intended for clients. The court with the plinths is the equivalent of the doorway to a conventional Tablinum, and the hall in complex G is an oversized Oecus, and it was a kind of gallery for displaying statues.

Based on this interpretation, building F, situated in the middle of the garden and surrounded by porticoes, would be the principal Triclinium of Lixus's palace. This great Triclinium would have been the venue for important official events, as an Oecus Cyzicenus for feasting while enjoying the landscape.

=== Roman period (40 ِAD to early 5th century AD) ===
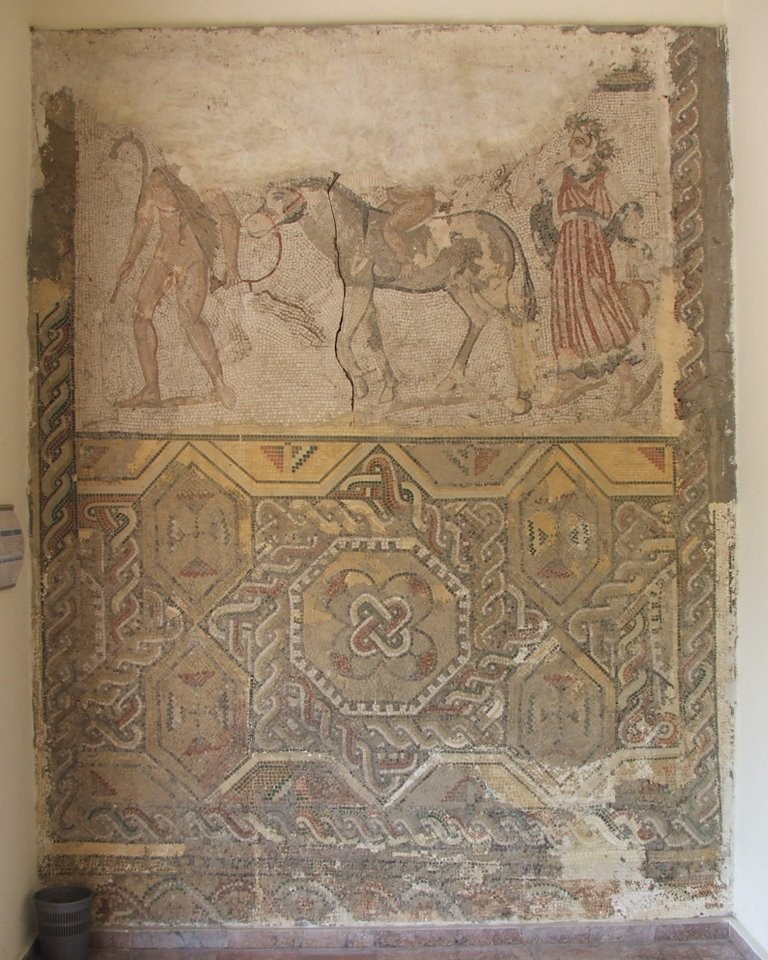
Roman mosaic from Lixus in the Tetouan Archaeological Museum

In recent excavation campaigns, researchers discovered the existence of levels that could be ascribed to late Roman times, and it is clear that the so-called "Temples quarter" suffered from major destruction that may be attributed to Aedemon's revolt. After this critical period which can be dated to between 40 and 50 AD, the palace was repaired.

This Roman phase corresponds also to a notable change in the urban landscape. In the northern sector of the "Temples quarter", there were structures that take up the space between exedra H and building G. The hall complex was interpreted as beginning with a Corinthian Atrium with six pilasters. A bath complex probably belonging to the Flavian period was built against the northern wall of the Atrium. Continuing northwards, a row of four cubicles (The largest of them measures 4*7 m) interconnected with each other have large doors opening onto a U-shaped peristyle decorated with columns, adorned with ionic capitals, and opened through a door onto the gallery of the Cryptoporticus. The principal floor of the western wing contained a room with five doors that lead into the peristyle surrounding the building F. The first leads into the south of the peristyle, the second leads into a room with a skylight in the ceiling to provide overhead lighting, the third and fourth doors have connected one of the cubicles with building F. Finally, the fifth door has connected the U-shaped peristyle G to the large peristyle F via a short passage.

Complexes F, G, and H were built at the same time. Building H was identified as a temple when it was discovered, it surrounded an interior garden with an ornamental feature, Building F was a large temple. This opinion was shared by later authors.

Next to the rooms mentioned above, there was a large Oecus which was the most important room in the whole of the western area. It was a huge T-shaped hall (14 m (46 ft) long, 12 m (39 ft) wide) adjoining a sophisticated chamber adorned with canopies resting on 7 small cylindrical columns. Researchers have also found a rectangular Corinthian atrium with two rows of plinths M, which served as the antechamber to a rectangular court decorated, and continued to the entrance in the eastern wall, where a great door has led into the large hall G which marked the northern end of the western wing.

=== Medieval period (12th century to 14th century) ===
Ruins on the hill of Lixus show a rectangular religious building, hammâm, and a mighty fountain on its bank. The cartography does not highlight the existence of any tower or strategic installation in the place. In the 1st century AD, The "Temples quarter" was adorned with public buildings including thermal baths, outbuildings, and buildings with an undetermined function.

The quarter had become the northern end of the city which has extended to the salt factories, after the withdrawal of the Roman administration in the south of the province and the relocation of Roman in the northern border of Loukkos river.

The row of small temples (C, A, D, and B) which faced east had survived until the final days of ancient Lixus. They had behind them a large open area extended to the end of the western wall of the city. A row of rooms bordered the space to the west, with some internal subdivisions that were built on the preexisting walls dating from the eighth to seventh century. The opus signinum pavements and opus quadratum podium had been built by the early second century.

Researchers suggest the presence of arcades and pergolas decorating the terraced gardens, which lead to the hypothesis that this whole area was a large urban sanctuary, including a variety of buildings laid out on different levels: some storage buildings, a temple surrounded by a cryptoporticus, and a relatively large cistern.

The city of Lixus in the 14th century was still an urban center, more densely populated than neighboring villages such as Larache: it remained inhabited even after the Arab-Islamic conquest, bearing the name of Tochoummis. Ruins of houses and a mosque built in the Almohad or Marinid period have survived from this period. Apparently, Lixus was abandoned when the city of Larache was fortified and consolidated.

As part of the implementation of the High Royal Guidelines aimed at rehabilitating the national cultural heritage, the Ministry of Culture and Communication has launched a vast program of restoration and rehabilitation of historic sites through the national territory of Morocco, involving the archaeological site of Lixus by highlighting the characteristics of the site and promoting the destination on the regional, national and international tourist map to contribute to local economic and social development. In 2019, the Ministry spent 11.8 million dirhams on a new visitor center and other new tourist facilities, 15 million dirhams on a restoration program, 6.75 million dirhams towards the restoration and maintenance of the site, 4.6 million dirhams on improving the site's surrounding infrastructure, and 2.2 million dirhams towards archeological research and training.

== See also ==
- Iulia Valentia Banasa – Ancient Berber-Roman city in Morocco
- Tamuda – Ancient Berber city and Roman military camp in Morocco
- Thamusida – Berber, Carthaginian, and Roman river port in Kenitra, Morocco
- Ancient Cotta – Ancient Roman town near Tangier, Morocco
- Roman colonies in Berber Africa
