= Intermezzo (disambiguation) =

An intermezzo is a musical composition which fits between other musical or dramatic entities, such as acts of a play or opera, or movements of a larger musical work.

Intermezzo may also refer to:

== Music ==
- intermedio, an Italian spectacle with music and dance
- Intermezzo (Strauss), an opera by Richard Strauss premiered in 1924
- Intermezzo in modo classico, Mussorgsky
- Intermezzo, organ composition by Jehan Alain (1911-1940)
- Intermezzo, organ composition by Herbert Sumsion (1899-1995)
- "Intermeco", national anthem of Bosnia and Herzegovina
- "Intermezzo No. 1", an ABBA instrumental track from their 1975 self-titled album
- Intermezzo (album), an album by Michael Angelo Batio
- "Intermezzo", a song by the Sword from the 2017 album Used Future

== Other arts, entertainment and media ==
- Intermezzo (1936 German film), a German film directed by Josef von Báky
- Intermezzo (1936 Swedish film), a Swedish language film starring Ingrid Bergman and Gösta Ekman
- Intermezzo (1939 film), an English language remake of the 1936 Swedish film starring Ingrid Bergman and Leslie Howard
- Intermezzo (novel), a 2024 novel by Sally Rooney
- InterMezzo (play), a 1933 play by Jean Giraudoux

== Other uses ==
- Intermezzo (chess), a chess tactic, more commonly called a Zwischenzug
- InterMezzo (file system), a file system for Linux
- Intermezzo (zolpidem tartrate), a prescription medication used for the treatment of insomnia associated with "early awakening"
- Intermezzo (horse), a thoroughbred racehorse
- Iranian Intermezzo, a period in Iranian history which saw the rise of various native Iranian Muslim dynasties
