= Du fait de cuisine =

1420 cookbook by Maistre Chiquart

The late medieval cookbook Du fait de cuisine ("On cookery") was written in 1420 in part to compete with the court of Burgundy by Maistre Chiquart, master chef of Amadeus VIII, Duke of Savoy.

The book contained banquet, supper, and curative recipes prepared for the duke, including a dish composed of "a castle made of molded meat paste, adorned with five firebreathing roasted animals, innumerable smaller molded figures, and a fountain spraying rosewater and mulled wine."

A translation of the work from Middle French to English was published in 2010.

== See also ==
- List of medieval cookbooks
