= Bruno Laurioux =

French Medievalist historian

- Born: 1959 (age 66–67); Loudun, Vienne, France
- Education: École Normale Supérieure Lettres et Sciences Humaines, Pantheon-Sorbonne University
- Occupation: Teacher at the Versailles Saint-Quentin-en-Yvelines University
- Known for: Sociologist

Bruno Laurioux is a French medievalist historian born in 1959 in Loudun.

== Biography ==
Alumnus of the École Normale Supérieure Lettres et Sciences Humaines (1979), Bruno Laurioux passes his History Agrégation (1982) and a PhD at the Pantheon-Sorbonne University with a thesis on "The Cookbooks in the West at the end of the Middle Ages" (1992).

He taught as a lecturer at the Paris 8 University (1993-1998) and at the Pantheon-Sorbonne University (1998-2005), and then as teacher at the Versailles Saint-Quentin-en-Yvelines University (since 2005), where he is deputy director of the host team ESR-Middle-Ages-modern times.

After having been Deputy Scientific Director for the ancient and medieval worlds in the Department of Humanities and Social Sciences of the French National Centre for Scientific Research (2006-2008), he became Director of the Department of Humanities and Social Sciences of the CNRS (2008). Appointed in February 2009 Director of the Institute of Humanities and Social Sciences of the French National Centre for Scientific Research, he retired on the 15th April 2010.

== Bibliography ==
- Le Moyen âge à table (The Middle Ages at the table), Paris : A. Biro, 1989
- Les livres de cuisine médiévaux (Medieval cookbooks), Turnhout : Brepols, 1997
- Le règne de Taillevent : livres et pratiques culinaires à la fin du Moyen Âge (The reign of Taillevent : books and culinary practices in the late Middle Ages), Paris : La Sorbonne, 1997
- La civilisation du Moyen âge en France (XIe-XVe siècles) (The civilisation of the Middle Ages in France (eleventh to fifteenth centuries), Paris : Nathan, 1998
- Éducation et cultures dans l'Occident chrétien du début du douzième au milieu du quinzième siècle (Education and culture in the Christian West from the early twelfth to the middle of the fifteenth century), Paris : Éd. Messene, 1998 (with Laurence Moulinier)
- Scrivere il Medioevo : lo spazio, la santità, il cibo : un libro dedicato ad Odile Redon, Roma : Viella, 2001 (dir.)
- Histoire et identités alimentaires en Europe (History and food identities in Europe), Paris : Hachette littératures, 2002 (with Martin Bruegel)
- Manger au Moyen âge : pratiques et discours alimentaires en Europe aux XIVe et XVe siècles (Eating in the Middle Ages: food practices and discourses in Europe in the fourteenth and fifteenth centuries), Paris : Hachette littératures, 2002
- Une histoire culinaire du Moyen âge (A culinary history of the Middle Ages), Paris : H. Champion, 2005
- Gastronomie, humanisme et société à Rome au milieu du XVe siècle. Autour du De honesta voluptate de Platina (Food, humanism and society in Rome in the middle of the fifteenth century. Around the De honesta voluptate Platina), Firenze : SISMEL -Edizioni del Galluzzo, 2006

== See also ==
- Agostino Paravicini Bagliani
