= Shevi'i shel Pesach =

Full holiday of the last day(s) of Passover

Shevi'i shel Pesach is the seventh and last day of the Passover holiday, which falls on the 21st of Nisan. On this day, according to the jewish tradition the splitting of the Red Sea occurred. Beyond the commandments that exist on each of the seven days of Passover, this is a full holiday, in which work is forbidden, except for work related to preparing food.

== Name ==
A common name today is "Second Holiday (of Passover)". A similar name appears in the Cairo Genizah calendar for the year 482 - "Second of Passover".

== The Origin of the Holiday ==
The first source in the Torah for the seventh holiday of Passover appears even before the event of Mount Sinai where the people of Israel received the commandments of the Torah upon them, and even before the exodus from Egypt.

This holiday is also mentioned in the portion of the festivals in the portion of Emor in the book of Leviticus. In the book of Deuteronomy, Israel was also commanded to celebrate the seventh day of Passover as a festival day. And it also appears in the portion of Pinchas in the mentioning of the additional sacrifices of the holidays.

Therefore, on the seventh day of Passover, there is a Torah commandment to rest from work, however, work related to food preparation is permitted on it – as on every festival day.

== Prayer ==
=== Hallel ===
On the seventh day of Passover, the Hallel is only a custom, therefore, the short version of the Hallel is recited, as on Rosh Chodesh.

=== Torah Reading ===
The Torah reading for this day deals with the miracle of the splitting of the Red Sea, which according to the tradition of our Sages occurred on the night of the seventh day of Passover.

And also in the Song of the Sea that was said following it.

In the Haftarah, "David's Song" is read, which is also a song like the Song of the Sea, and the miracle of the splitting of the Red Sea is alluded to in it.

On the second festival day in the Diaspora, "All the Firstborn" is read, and if it falls on Shabbat (when there are not enough verses to divide the aforementioned reading into seven aliyot), most communities start with "Asser Te'Asser"

=== Yizkor ===
In synagogues following the Eastern Ashkenazi custom, Yizkor is recited on the seventh day of Passover (in the Diaspora, on the last day of Passover), before placing the Torah scroll back in the Ark.

=== Shehecheyanu ===
The seventh day of Passover is the only festival from the Torah on which the blessing "Shehecheyanu" (the blessing of time) is not recited, because it is not a festival in its own right but part of the Passover festival.

== End of the Holiday ==
The night after the seventh day of Passover (or the eighth outside of Israel) is called Rompelnacht (Night of Chaos) by some Ashkenazi Jews. Among some of the Eastern communities, especially among Moroccan Jews, it is customary to celebrate Mimouna on the night after the holiday, where they tend to eat Mufleta.
