= Kitāb al-ṭabīẖ =

13th-century Andalusian cookbook

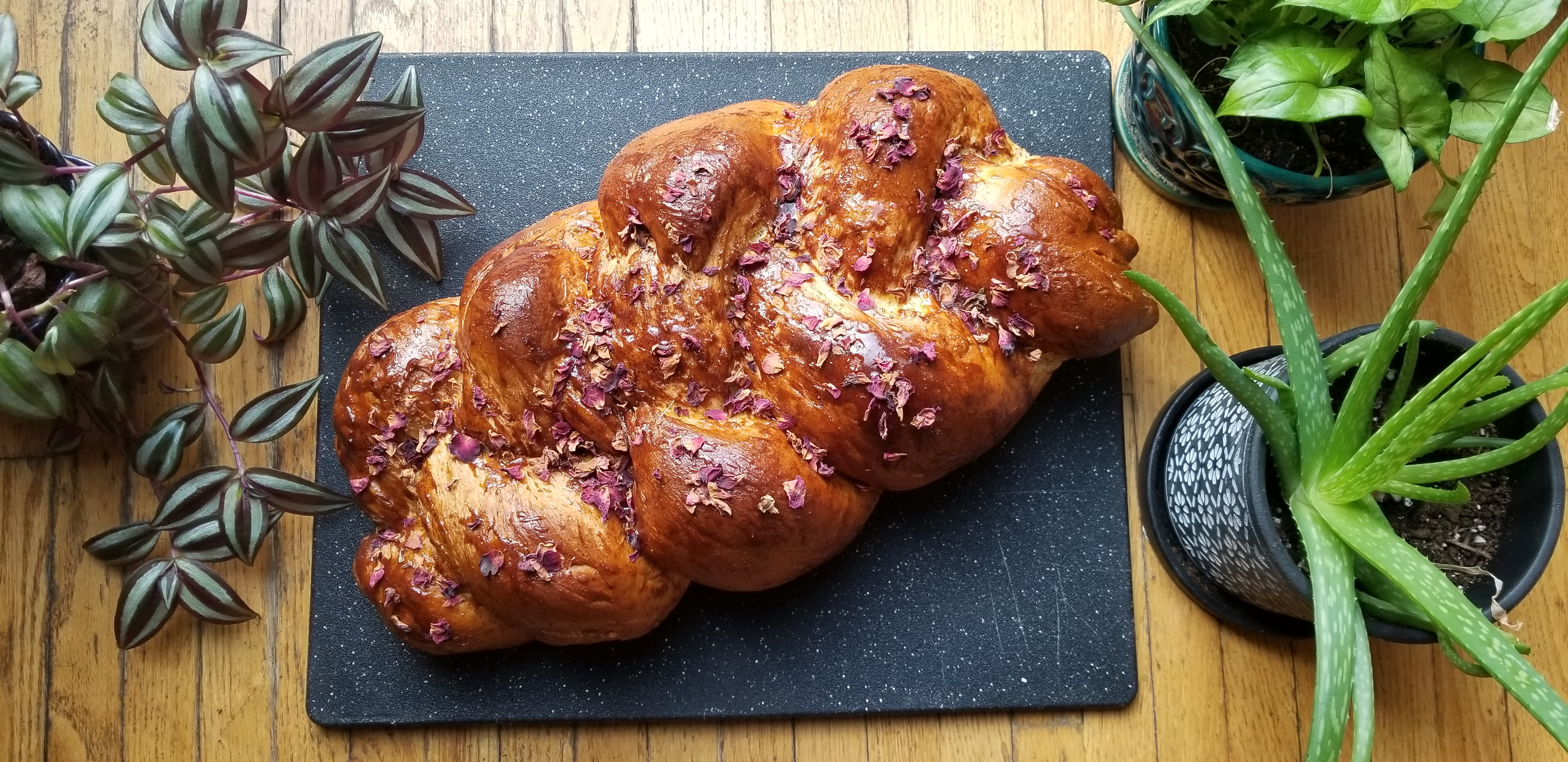
Challah bread made using a modern interpretation of the braided bread recipe in the book, reworked by food historian Hélène Jawhara Piñer

The Kitāb al-ṭabīẖ (Arabic: كتاب الطبيخ, lit. 'the cookbook'), formally the Kitāb al-Ṭabikh fī al-Maghrib wa al-Andalus fī ʽAṣr al-Muwaḥḥidīn (Arabic: كتاب الطبخ في المغرب والأندلس في عصر الموحدين, lit. 'The book of cooking in Maghreb and Al-Andalus in the era of the Almohads'), is the oldest known cookbook from the Iberian Peninsula. Written in Arabic, this text is believed to have been composed during the 12th or 13th centuries, during or shortly after the Almohad period.

The Kitāb al-ṭabīẖ features 462 recipes categorized by type and purpose. It begins with classical quotations on the importance of appetite and taste, integrating culinary practices with medical knowledge. The manuscript is divided into five parts, focusing on simple dishes, a variety of meats, vegetables, bread, sweets, and medicinal preparations. The text includes six explicitly Jewish recipes, reflecting the multicultural environment of Medieval Spain. Other recipes may also have Jewish origins and include early versions of dishes still consumed in Sephardic Jewish cuisine.

The author’s identity remains uncertain, though he is believed to be an educated Andalusian with extensive knowledge of culinary and medical practices. Translation of this book into English was completed by Charles Perry.

== Organization and structure ==
The Kitāb al-ṭabīẖ features a methodical organization, presenting recipes categorized by type and intended purpose. The manuscript begins with quotations from classical writers Hippocrates and Galen, which describe the significance of appetite and taste in food selection. The text integrates culinary practices with medical knowledge, showing a sophisticated understanding of diet and health. Each recipe begins with details about its preparation and intended audience, includes rare measurements of ingredients, starts with meat preparation, and concludes with instructions on people who would enjoy the dish, as well as possible variations.

The Kitāb al-ṭabīẖ features a total of 462 recipes, divided into several sections. The first part includes three chapters with 93 recipes, focusing on simple dishes and grilled meats. The second part expands to seven chapters with 220 recipes, encompassing a wide range of dishes including those with meat, fish, and vegetables. The third part includes recipes for bread and sweets, while the fourth and fifth parts offer additional recipes for vegetables, meats, and sweets, culminating in a section on medicinal preparations.

The manuscript's culinary profile is notable for its emphasis on meat dishes, with 311 recipes dedicated to various types of meat. The text also includes a significant number of sweet dishes, many of which incorporate honey. The book showcases both elite and common dishes. The book stands out for its inclusion of vegetarian dishes, which represent 14% of the savory recipes.

== Ethnic, religious and regional influences ==
The Kitāb al-ṭabīẖ includes six recipes explicitly identified as Jewish, in addition to references to Christian culinary traditions. This inclusion reflects the multicultural environment of the Iberian Peninsula during the period, and the interactions between various ethnic and religious communities.

Distinct from other cookbooks of its time, the Kitāb al-ṭabīẖ is notable for its explicit mention of Jewish recipes, which are identified by the term "Jewish" in their titles. These recipes include "A Jewish Dish of Chicken [with Stuffing]," "A Jewish Dish of Partridge," "A Stuffed, Buried Jewish Dish," and "A Jewish Dish of Eggplants Stuffed with Meat." The use of the term "Jewish" suggests that these dishes were either prepared in a manner unique to Jewish culinary practices or adapted from non-Jewish dishes.

In addition to these explicitly Jewish recipes, other dishes within the Kitāb al-ṭabīẖ may also have Jewish origins, though they are not specifically labeled as such in the text. Some of these dishes are believed to be early versions of foods still consumed by Sephardic Jews today. One of those is murakkaba, possibly an early version of mofletta, a pancake dish consumed by Moroccan Jews during Mimouna. The Kitāb al-ṭabīẖ also includes a recipe for braided bread similar to modern challah, which may represent an early precursor to the bread that traveled with Jews expelled from Spain and was subsequently adopted by Jews in Central Europe, becoming a staple of Ashkenazi cuisine. Other recipes in the book reflect culinary practices shared by both Jews and Muslims, such as sfenj.

The manuscript also discusses regional and national culinary preferences, providing insights into how different cultures and ethnic groups approached food. For example, it mentions specific cities like Córdoba and Seville in relation to certain dishes and describes varying taste preferences across regions, such as the Persian preference for rice with sumac and the Egyptian fondness for a hen dish called muruziyya. According to the manuscript, the muruziyya is disliked by the Iraqis due to its use of pears, jujubes, and oil, which they associate with medicinal qualities. In another example, the practice of sprinkling black pepper on dishes is noted as a custom associated with Christians and Berbers.

== Author ==
The identity of the author of the Kitāb al-ṭabīẖ remains elusive. While the book's detailed content suggests an educated individual, the medieval concept of authorship was different from today's standards. The author may have compiled texts rather than writing them, or multiple authors might have contributed. The text indicates that the author was a member of the upper classes in al-Andalus before the Christian conquest of Córdoba in 1236, with a deep understanding of table manners and service. His references to historical figures and practices suggest significant experience and cultural knowledge.

The author appears to be of Andalusian, possibly Arab, origin based on his familiarity with local customs and multi-cultural influences. He lived in various locations, including Marrakesh, Ceuta, and Ifriqiya, before the Hafsid period. His observations on dining customs and references to non-local practices suggest an understanding of varying culinary traditions. The text's detailed knowledge of medical and dietary practices supports the hypothesis that the author was an educated individual. Scholars such as Bernard Rosenberger have proposed that the author could be a doctor, given the book's dietary recommendations, but other possibilities include botanists, agronomists, or professional cooks. Manuela Marín, for example, suggested that the author could be Abū l-Ḥaǧǧāǧ Yūsuf b. Yaḥya b. Isḥāq al-Isrā’ilī, a Jewish doctor from Fez who was a disciple of Maimonides in Fustat.

== See also ==
- Arab cuisine
- Kitab al-Wuslah ila l-habib, 13th century Arabic cookbook
- List of medieval cookbooks
- Sephardic Jewish cuisine
- Regional cuisines of medieval Europe#Western Mediterranean
