= Moroccan Jewish cuisine =

Traditional cuisine of the Moroccan Jewish community

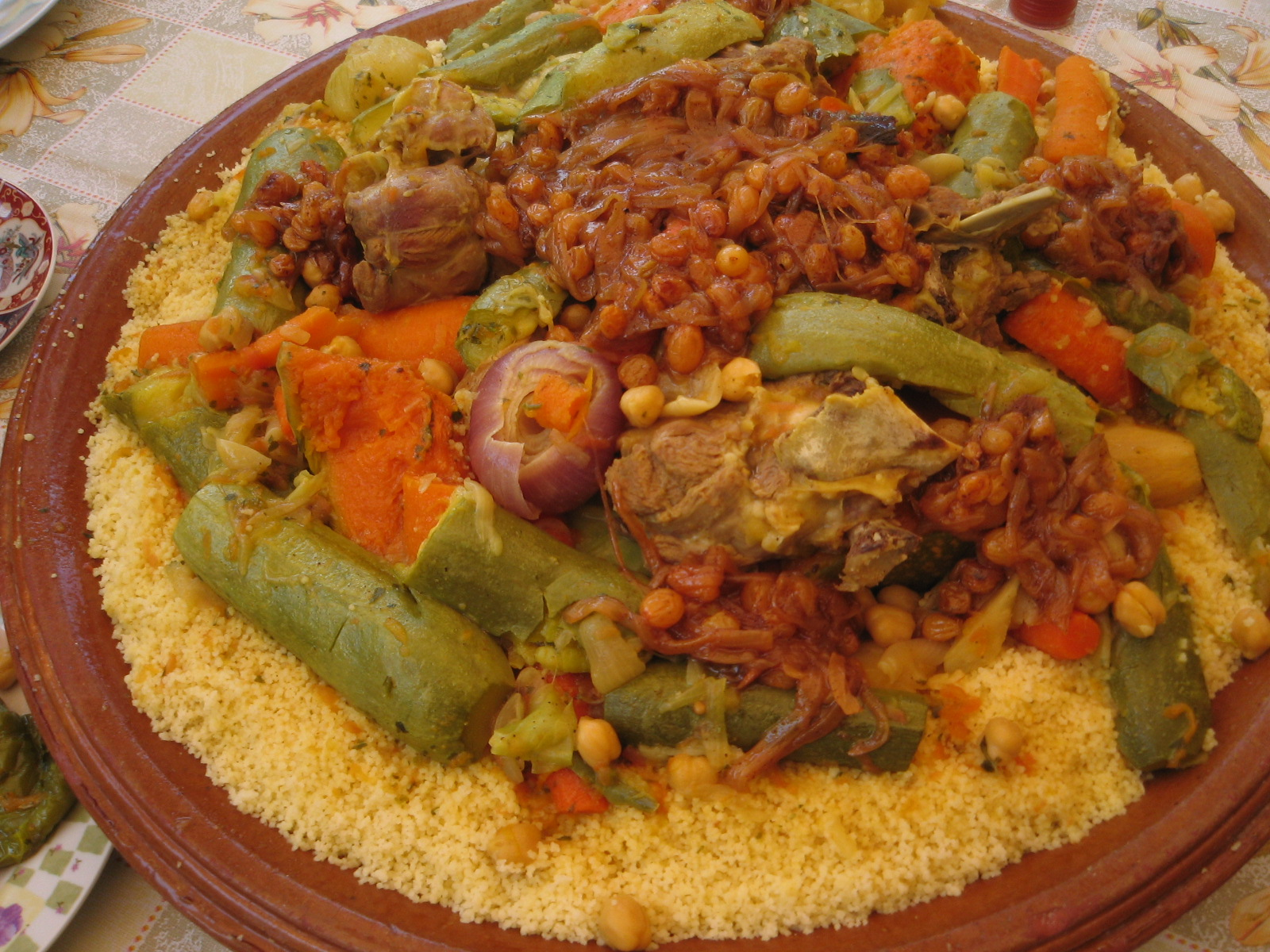
Moroccan Jewish couscous

The Moroccan Jewish cuisine is the traditional cuisine of the Jewish community of Morocco. combines elements of the local Moroccan cuisine, the culinary traditions brought by Jews from other locations to Morocco, and the Jewish dietary laws (kashrut). Generally, there is some overlap between Jewish and their Muslim neighbors' cuisine in Morocco. The distinction between the two is primarily based on kashrut and finding kosher solutions for traditional dishes.

Jewish dishes in Morocco hold social and familial significance, centering around Shabbat and holiday meals, which feature complex dishes and festive meals. Among the famous dishes are couscous, spicy fish (known as dagra), tagine, and salads. Similar to other cuisines, great attention is paid not only to the flavors but also to the appearance and presentation of the dishes.

Basic ingredients include a variety of spices, legumes, vegetables, and fish. Morocco is renowned for its extensive use of spices such as turmeric, cumin, paprika, and saffron, which have become integral to the local cuisine.

== Influences ==
The Moroccan Jewish cuisine was influenced by various culinary traditions, both regional and foreign. The three main foreign traditions that influenced Moroccan cuisine were Arab, French, and Spanish, with each era introducing new cooking styles, methods, and spices.

In central Morocco, particularly in cities such as Fez, Rabat, and Meknes, the cuisine was shaped by the royal court's culinary style, which blended Andalusian and Arab influences. This resulted in refined and complex dishes, including stews made with lamb, beef, or chicken, and incorporating fruits such as apples, plums, and raisins, along with almonds (tanizyeh).

In northern Morocco, places like Tangier and Tetouan experienced Spanish culinary influence, characterized by the use of many herbs, tomatoes, and lemons. The southern areas, including the town of Mogador, were influenced by local Berber cuisine. Mogador was particularly renowned for its culinary excellence, benefiting from trade that brought in almonds and spices from the East. Local Jewish women became famous for their expertise in making sweets, such as marzipan, jams, preserved fruits, cookies, and cakes for holidays and special events. Additionally, couscous was commonly used in the south, served both as an everyday dish and in holiday variations featuring sugared fruits, almonds, and cinnamon-flavored raisins.

Kashrut also heavily influenced Moroccan Jewish cuisine. Muslims frequently used semneh, a non-kosher spicy butter. In adherence to Kashrut, Jews ensured their cooking tools were kosher, separated meat and dairy, and those who could not obtain kosher dairy did not consume it. This may explain the relative scarcity of dairy dishes in Moroccan Jewish cuisine.

== Spices and herbs ==
Spices and herbs are a central feature of Moroccan Jewish cuisine and include cinnamon bark; seeds such as caraway, cumin, and fennel; and pods like cardamom, broad beans, and peas. Commonly used spices in Jewish Moroccan cuisine include saffron, turmeric, marjoram, cinnamon, ginger, hot pepper, dried and fresh cilantro, cumin, mace (kosht), lemon verbena, lemon balm, mint, and wormwood. Moroccan Jews also attributed medicinal properties to these herbs and spices, and used them differently from their non-Jewish neighbors.

The sakhqa, a spice mixture used as a base for most stews, was made from red pepper paste mixed with hot oil, salt, and garlic.

Historically, olive oil was the primary oil for salads and cold dishes, while peanut oil and argan oil (from trees grown near Mogador) were used for cooking. Orange flower water (ma-zhar) was typically used for flavoring pastries, with rose water used less frequently.

== Main dishes ==
Pastilla is a traditional dish chicken pastry, which balances sweet and savory elements with a combination of tender and crunchy textures. Historically, it traces back to a 13th-century Andalusian pigeon stew that migrated to Morocco, where it evolved into a pie called bastiya. Over time, chicken replaced pigeon meat, and the dish became characterized by its use of delicate pastry sheets called "warqa," along with a dusting of powdered sugar and cinnamon. In the Jewish Moroccan cuisine of Casablanca, pastilla includes browned onions in the filling. Modern Israeli adaptations sometimes use filo sheets and shape the dish into cigars. This dish is often featured at weddings and celebrations.

== Fruits and vegetables ==
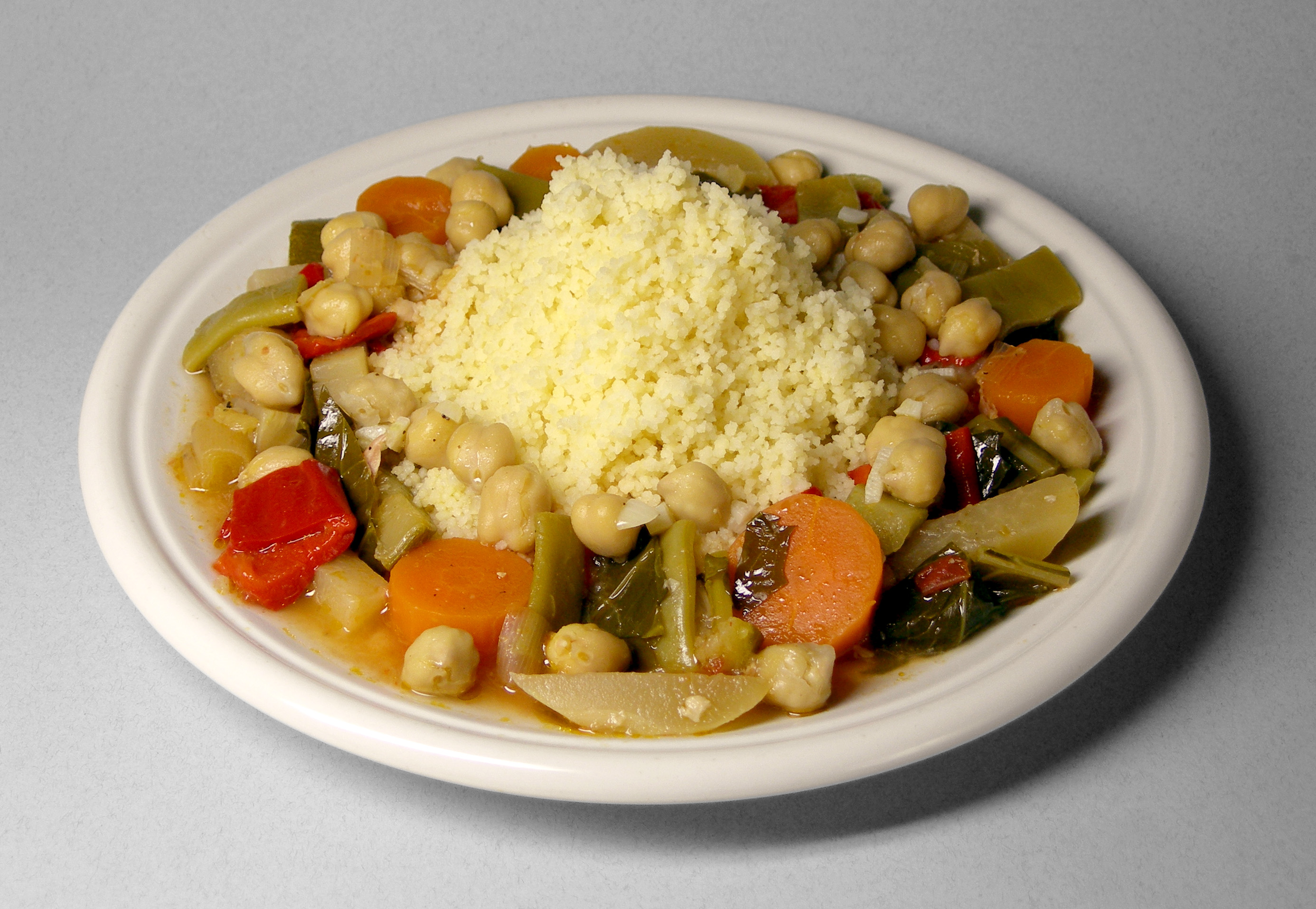
Couscous with vegetables and chickpeas

The Jews of Morocco historically used a wide variety of vegetables, including potatoes, pumpkins, carrots, scallions, onions, fava beans, peas, fennel, celery, artichokes, eggplants, tomatoes, cauliflower, green and white beans, sweet and spicy peppers, zucchini, olives, and truffles, to accompany meat, chicken, fish, and stews, as well as in fresh and cooked salads, preservation, and pickling. Salads were spiced with pepper, olive oil, and cumin, and under the influence of French cuisine, vinegar was also used.

Sabbath and holiday meals typically began with mezze, or qamia, consisting of 6-8 types of salads, as well as pickled vegetables. Roasted and salted legumes, such as fava beans and chickpeas, were also served with mezze, along with alcoholic drinks or at the end of the meal.

At the end of the meal, fresh fruits like apples, pears, oranges, grapefruits, quinces, figs, grapes, plums, and watermelon were served, as well as dried fruits such as figs, dates, plums, walnuts, almonds, carob, raisins, and more.

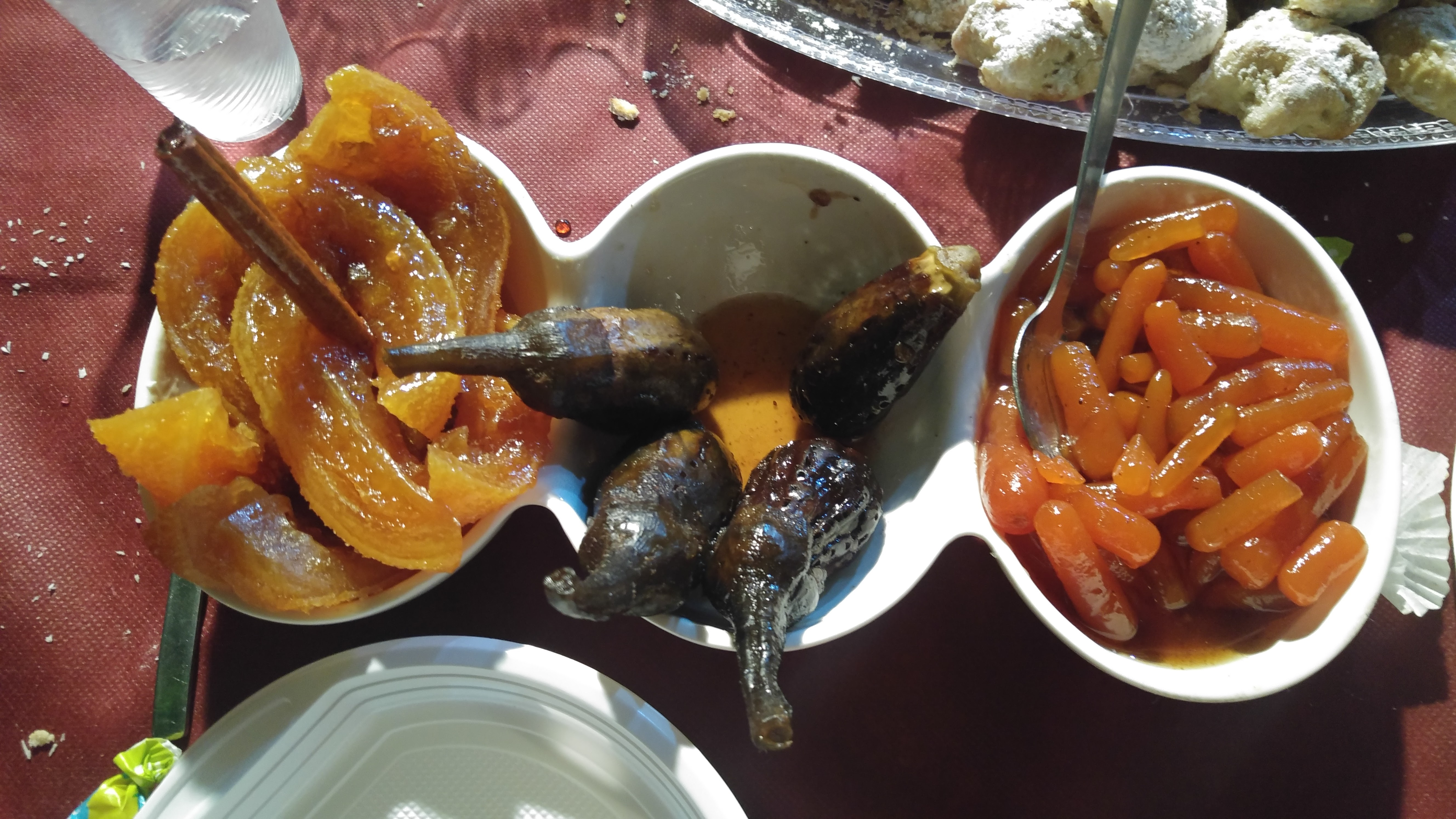
Sweet vegetable preserves, served on Mimouna

During events and holidays, the housewife often served fruit preserves and sugared fruits, which were used to preserve seasonal fruits year-round. These included jams made from oranges, grapefruits, grapes, apricots, dates, figs, and sometimes even slightly sweet vegetables, such as eggplants, turnips, tomatoes, carrots, and pumpkins. The vegetable-based jams were considered a craft and were served in crystal bowls alongside glasses of water, primarily on special occasions and during Mimouna.

== Breads ==
In Morocco, daily bread loaves were circular and those made for Shabbat and holidays were spiced with anise, creatively designed, and coated with sesame seeds. Each family had its unique bread design for recognition. These loaves were typically baked in public bakeries (frans or kushas), with adolescent messengers delivering them to homes. Special bread varieties were crafted for holidays and events, such as the egg-embedded "boyoza di Purim."

== Cookies ==
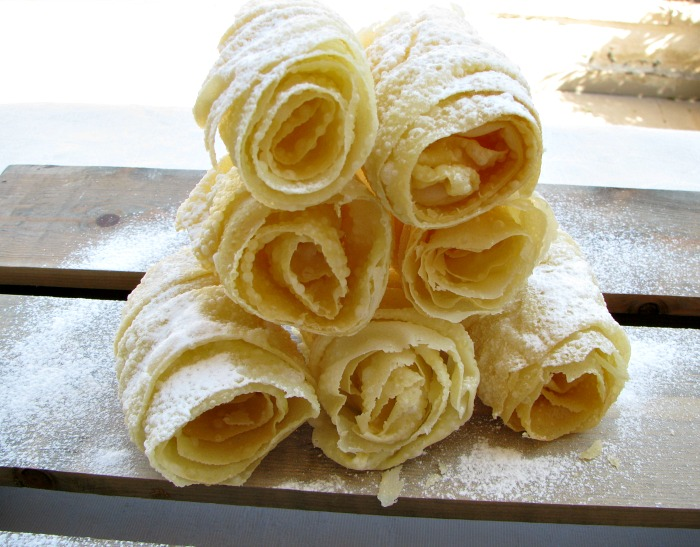
Fazuelos, fried cookies, later soaked in honey syrup, historically associated with Casablanca

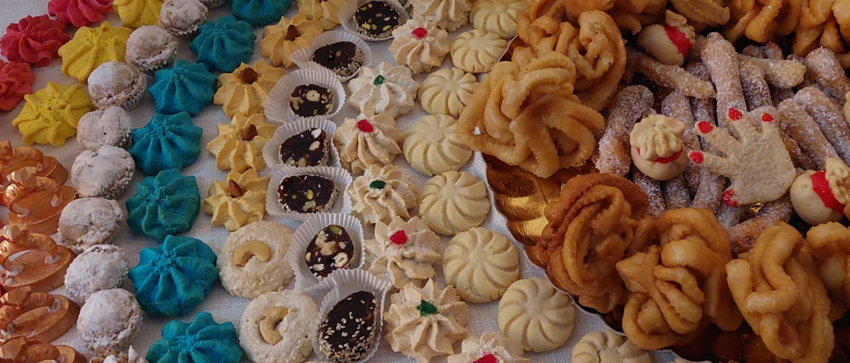
Moroccan Jewish sweets, including chebakia (golden-flavored deep fried pastries, to the right)

Moroccan Jews were skilled in making four types of cookies:

- Dry cookies like the anise-flavored rifat
- Fazuelos: fried cookies later soaked in honey syrup
- Helwah ma'aquda: cookies made of caramel and sesame
- Cookies made with almonds, walnuts, and peanuts

Mogador was famed for its diverse marzipans and almond cookies such as the "deer horns" (grun lghazal). Different regions also had their signature cookie styles, such as dough-cookies in villages, almond half-moons (lhalal) in Fez, and Fazuelos in Casablanca.

== Holidays ==
=== Mimouna ===
Moroccan Jews are renowned for their festive Mimouna celebration, which immediately follows Passover to mark the return to eating chametz (leavened bread). This holiday is distinguished by special sweet delicacies served in a unique manner.

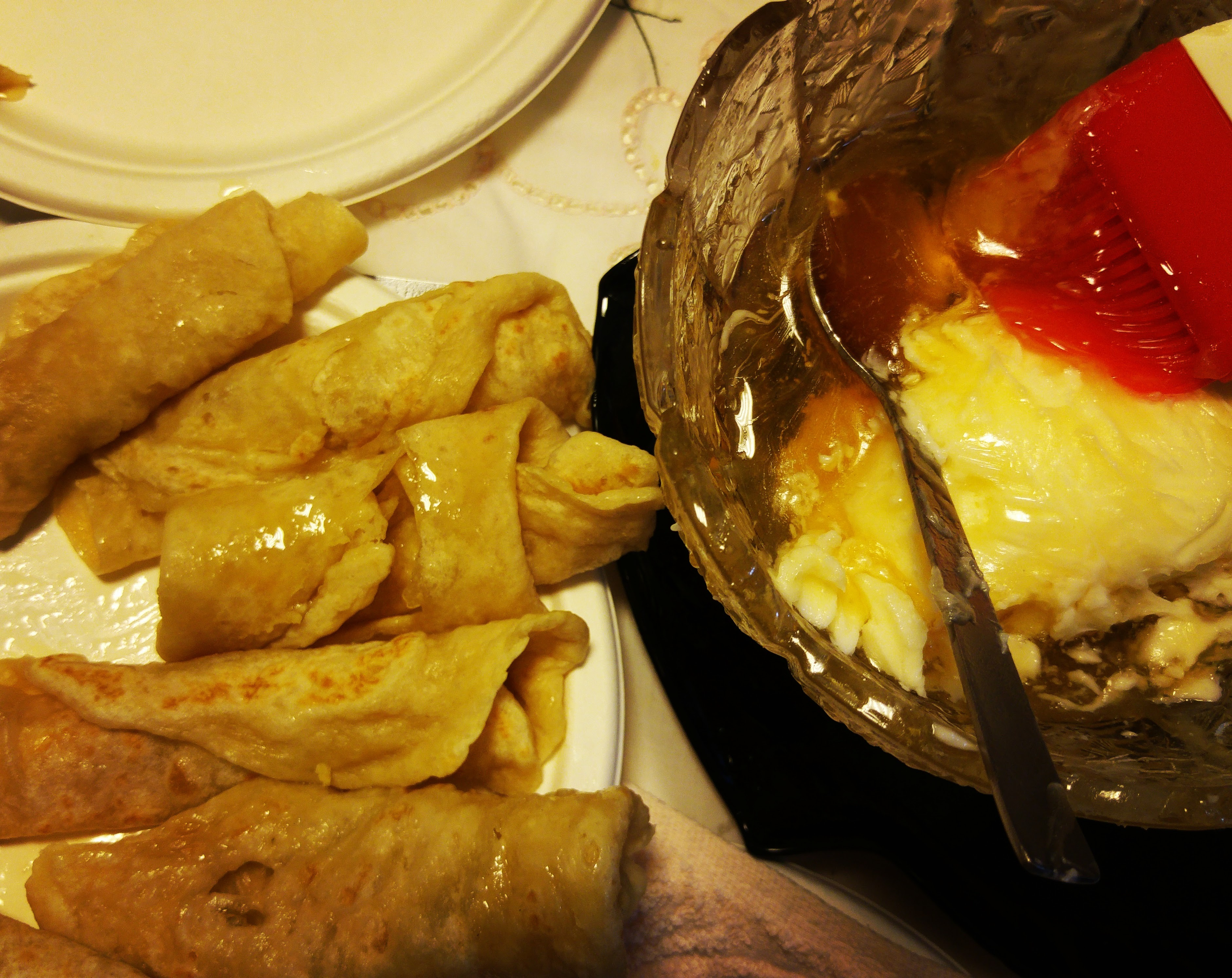
Mofletta pancakes are traditionally served on Mimouna alongside butter and honey

Mimouna tables are traditionally adorned with wheat stalks, mint leaves, and flowers, along with a wide bowl of flour containing five gold coins symbolizing luck (hamsa), alongside five green bean bags and five dates. Served on them are sweet treats like coconut desserts, caramel, marzipan, jams, dried and fresh fruits, nuts, and various candies. The centerpiece is the "Mofletta," a thin pancake prepared at the end of the holiday, the first bread after Passover, piled in heaps at the center of the festive table. Diners spread it with butter and honey, and roll it into small rolls. Alongside the moufleta, it is customary to drink cups of hot mint tea. Another prominent dessert commonly served is zabane (almond nougat).

In addition to these, no sour, salty, or dark-colored foods are served on Mimouna, such as black coffee, but rather dairy dishes.
