= The Great Canadian Baking Show season 6 =

Television cooking show

The Great Canadian Baking Show
- Season 6
- Starring: Ann Pornel; Alan Shane Lewis; Bruno Feldeisen; Kyla Kennaley
- No. of episodes: 8

Release
- Original network: CBC Television
- Original release: October 2 – November 20, 2022

Season chronology
- ← Previous; The Great Canadian Holiday Baking Show (2021) Next → The Great Canadian Holiday Baking Show (2022)

The sixth season of The Great Canadian Baking Show premiered on CBC Television on October 2, 2022. As with previous seasons, ten amateur bakers will compete over eight weeks of challenges, vying for the title. Ann Pornel and Alan Shane Lewis return for their third season as hosts. Bruno Feldeisen and Kyla Kennaley return for their sixth and fourth seasons respectively as judges.

== Bakers ==
Baker	Age	Profession	Hometown
André Hayde	46	ESL teacher and personal trainer	Ottawa, ON
Chi Nguyễn	35	C.O.O. of a cellular technology company	Toronto, ON
John Fowler	49	University administrator	Victoria, BC
Jomar Manzano	37	Structural engineer	Toronto, ON
Kristi Carey	29	Grant and proposal writer	Toronto, ON
Lauren Tjoe	21	Finance student	Tsawwassen, BC
Lydiane Gaborieau	35	Biobank manager	Montreal, QC
Nigel Batchelor	32	Geography Graduate student	Winnipeg, MB
Rosemary O'Neill	64	Federal security advisor	Ottawa, ON
Zoya Thawer	33	Pediatric endocrinologist	Edmonton, AB

== Results summary ==
Colour key:

Baker was one of the judges' least favourite bakers that week, but was not eliminated.
Baker was one of the judges' favourite bakers that week, but was not the Star Baker.
Baker got through to the next round.
Baker was eliminated.
Baker was the Star Baker.
Baker was a season runner-up.
Baker was the season winner.

Elimination chart
Baker	1	2	3	4	5	6	7	8
Lauren					SB		SB	WINNER
Zoya						SB		Runner Up
Chi	SB							Runner Up
Kristi			SB				OUT	
John				SB		OUT		
Rosemary					OUT			
Jomar				OUT				
Nigel			OUT					
André		OUT						
Lydiane	OUT							

== Episodes ==
Baker eliminated
Star Baker
Winner

=== Episode 1: Cake Week ===
For their first signature challenge, the bakers were given two hours to create a dozen friand cakes with a nut flour of their choice. For the technical challenge, the bakers had an hour and 45 minutes to make a Bolo de rolo, a Brazilian dessert, consisting of thin layers of dough wrapped with a layer of guava paste. For the showstopper, the bakers had three hours and 45 minutes to make a Kawaii cake - a cake decorated using the Japanese Kawaii trend.

Baker	Signature (12 Friand Cakes)	Technical (Bolo de rolo)	Showstopper (Kawaii cake)
André	Pistachio Pineapple Friands	10th	Sweet Citrus Kawaii
Chi	Black Forest Friands	1st	Halloween Crunch Cake
John	Figgy Duff Friands	7th	Spooky Surprise Cake
Jomar	Stracciatella Friands	4th	Halo Halo Cake
Kristi	Mango Pie Friands	3rd	Big Breakfast Cake
Lauren	Sunny Tsawwassen Friands	5th	Frogs in Love Cake
Lydiane	Seaberry Star Friands	9th	Arsène Lapin Cake
Nigel	Chicken and Waffle Friands	6th	Kawaii Sushi Roll
Rosemary	Barmbrack Friands	2nd	Mug of Hot Chocolate
Zoya	White Poppyseed Friands	8th	Monkey Business Cake

=== Episode 2: Biscuit and Bar Week ===
For their second signature challenge, the bakers were given two hours to create twelve meringue bars with a cookie base, a choice of filling and a meringue top. For the technical challenge, the bakers had two hours to make 36 alfajores, with a thick gooey layer of dulce de leche, sandwiched between two cookies. The contestants had to make 2 versions, 18 chocolate alfajores and 18 vanilla alfajores. For the showstopper, the bakers had four hours to make a fairytale scene made out of cookies.

Baker	Signature (12 Meringue Bars)	Technical (36 Alfajores)	Showstopper (Fairytale Scene)
André	Brazilian Millionaire Bars	7th	Central Park Carriage Ride
Chi	Tropical Dream Bars	1st	Hansel & Gretel's Revenge
John	Black & Blue Meringue Bars	6th	Fairy Door
Jomar	Beat the Heat Bars	2nd	Ugly Duckling Cookie Scene
Kristi	Best Queer Bars in Town	5th	Legend of the Jade Rabbit
Lauren	Mum's Margarita Bars	8th	Billy Goats Gruff
Nigel	Burnt Toast & Raspberry Jam Bars	3rd	Jarashi the Eternal Cookie Dragon
Rosemary	Sweet & Tangy Chamoy Bars	9th	Twelve Dancing Princesses
Zoya	Pretty in Pink Bars	4th	Rapunzel & the Radish Guards

=== Episode 3: Bread Week ===
For their third signature challenge, the bakers were given one hour and 45 minutes to bake a flatbread with a filling of their choice. For the technical challenge the bakers had two hours to make a Swedish Tea Ring, a sweet yeasted dough flavoured with cinnamon and cardamom, filled with raisins and twisted into a ring. For the showstopper the bakers had four hours to create "a bread work of art inspired by any artist, style or movement."

Baker	Signature (Flatbread)	Technical (Swedish Tea Ring)	Showstopper (Bread Work of Art)
Chi	Comforting Curry Pancakes	4th	The Meow
John	Muhammara-Stuffed Gözlemes	2nd	A Bread for All Seasons
Jomar	Lumpiang Gulay Patties	7th	Portrait of a Bread Queen
Kristi	Fantastic Family Fusion Flatbreads	1st	A Fresh Bread Perspective
Lauren	Sticky Gochujang Pockets	5th	Baby, You Can Drive My Bread Car
Nigel	Hot Dog & Pizza 'Zones	8th	Postmodern Super Sandwich
Rosemary	Smoked Meat Knish Dish	6th	Breading Cake
Zoya	Mom's Samosa Paratha	3rd	Bread the Needle Box

=== Episode 4: Botanical Week ===
For their fourth signature challenge, the bakers were given one hour and 45 minutes to bake a dozen pressed flower sandwich cookies. For the technical challenge the bakers had one hour and 45 minutes to make 16 chebakia, pastry made of strips of dough rolled to resemble a rose, deep-fried until golden, then coated with a syrup made of honey and orange blossom water and sprinkled with sesame. For the showstopper, the bakers had four hours to create an illusion cake, inspired by botanical themes.

Baker	Signature (12 Pressed Flower Sandwich Cookies)	Technical (16 Chebakia)	Showstopper (Illusion Cake)
Chi	Jasmine & Peach Cookies	4th	Lettuce Eat Cake Salad
John	Forest & Flower Cookies	3rd	Boozy Vacation Pineapple
Jomar	Alfajores from Home	7th	Succulent Mini-Garden
Kristi	Both/And Cookies	5th	Bonsai Tree
Lauren	Big Fig Wasps	6th	Squash Garden
Rosemary	Bee-Crazy Biscuits	1st	Gravity-Defying Flowerpots
Zoya	Almond & Clover Cookie	2nd	Terrarium for Nathan

=== Episode 5: Chocolate Week ===
For their Signature Challenge, the six remaining bakers were given two hours 15 minutes to make eight chocolate-centric ice cream sandwiches showcasing homemade ice cream between two soft cookies, featuring any flavour they see like, as long as chocolate has a starring role. In the Technical challenge, they had to recreate Kyla's favourite cake, sacher torte, the famed Viennese specialty with two layers of chocolate sponge, a layer of apricot jam, and a shiny dark chocolate glaze, all in two hours and 15 minutes. In the Showstopper, they had three hours and 15 minutes to create a 3D chocolate reveal, with a hidden dessert cloaked in a chocolate shell.

Baker	Signature (8 Ice Cream Sandwiches)	Technical (Sacher Torte)	Showstopper (3D Chocolate Reveal)
Chi	Chocolate Sesame Mochi Bears	6th	Citrus Surprise
John	Chocolate Citrus Crunch	3rd	Triple Chocolate Cake
Kristi	Frosty Family Fusion	5th	Cognac Layer Cake
Lauren	Flourless Canine Crunch	1st	Chocolate Surprise Par-tea
Rosemary	Toast to Chocolate	4th	Don't Hide Your Light Under a Bushel
Zoya	Triple Threat	2nd	Tiger Tail Blooming Flower

=== Episode 6: Pastry Week ===
For the Signature Challenge the five remaining bakers are given two hours to make eight Hungarian Chimney Cakes or Kürtőskalács. These are coiled pastries rolled in a sweet topping then baked. Traditionally chimney cakes are baked over a spit and are hollow but the bakers are required to include a yummy filling of their choice. In the Technical Challenge they had two hours to create a Mango Rose Tart, composed of a crumbly shortcut pastry, a tangy mango curd, and luscious creme diplomat. Topping the tart are freshly sliced mangoes arranged in a rose pattern and mango caviar. This is a modern take on a classic French tarte aux pommes. For the Showstopper, they had four hours to make a baklava tower. A popular Middle Eastern dessert, baklava is a gooey, nutty multi-layer pastry made with phyllo. The bakers must make their own phyllo dough and create two types of baklava for their towers.

Baker	Signature (8 Chimney Cakes - Kürtőskalács)	Technical (Mango Rose Tart)	Showstopper (Baklava Tower)
Chi	Chimney Cake Tiramisu	3rd	Six Degrees of Baklava
John	Childhood Chimney Cake	5th	Sugar & Spice Baklava Tower
Kristi	Japanese Hot Dog Chimneys	4th	Carnival Carousel Tower
Lauren	Rhubarb Rose Bouquets	1st	Pistachio Petal Baklava Tower
Zoya	Ice Cream Cone Chimney Cakes	2nd	Baklava Gardens of Paradise

=== Episode 7: Fancy Dessert Week ===
For the Signature Challenge, the four remaining bakers were given two hours to make ten mochi donuts. In the Technical Challenge, they had two hours to create a sans rival, a Filipino take on a dacquoise, using cashews instead of hazelnuts. For the Showstopper, they had four and a half hours to make a Jelly Art Cake, featuring personalized art encased in transparent gelatin as part of a cake with traditional layers of sponge, mousse, and ganache.

Baker	Signature (10 Mochi donuts)	Technical (Sans rival)	Showstopper (Jelly Art Cake)
Chi	Lunchbox Mochi Donuts	4th	Bonbon Box
Kristi	All About Mom Mochi Donuts	1st	Fishbowl Apartment Cake
Lauren	Squishy & Delishy Mochi Donuts	2nd	Dino Island
Zoya	African Street Food Mochi Donuts	3rd	African Sugarcane Grove

=== Episode 8: Finale ===
In the Signature Challenge, the bakers were given two hours and 15 minutes to create a Paris-brest, with their choice of either sweet or savoury flavours and fillings. In the Technical Challenge, they had two and a half hours to make a cassata siciliana, a sponge cake with ricotta and chocolate chip filling, decorated with trapezoidal pistachio marzipan, royal icing, and topped with candied fruit. For the final Showstopper, the bakers had to create a garden party dessert centrepiece, composed of at least three bakes, within four and a half hours.

Baker	Signature (Paris-brest)	Technical (Cassata Siciliana)	Showstopper (Garden Party Centrepiece)
Chi	Childhood Memories Paris-Brest	3rd	Mid-Autumn Festival Tower
Lauren	Tjoe-Choux Stew-Choux	1st	Veggie Garden Party
Zoya	Hondwo Paris-Brest	2nd	Garden Wedding Arch
