= Fazuelos =

Sephardic Jewish pastries of thin fried dough

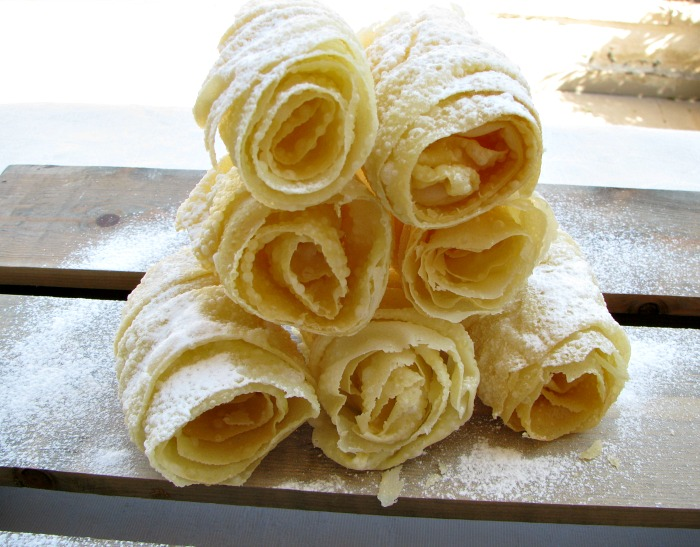
- Alternative names: Fijuelas, hiuelas, deblas
- Type: Pastry
- Main ingredients: Flour, eggs

Fazuelos, also known as fijuelas, hiuelas, deblas, and hojuelas are pastries of thin fried dough. A type of rolled pastry, their origins trace back to Spain, with references dating back to the late Spanish Middle Ages.

== Sephardic tradition ==
In Sephardic Jewish tradition, these pastries, reminiscent of Esther's megillah due to their characteristic rolled form, which recalls the shape of Haman's ears, hold cultural significance, particularly during the celebration of Purim.

Historically, fazuelos were mentioned in literature, notably in Francisco Delicado's La Lozana Andaluza, where a Jewish woman named Aldonza reminisces about preparing the pastry while living in Andalusia, fleeing persecution from the Spanish Inquisition. Fazuelos are also made by non-Jewish communities, especially during the Christian festival of Semana Santa (Holy Week), which coincides closely with Purim. This cross-cultural adoption of the pastry is documented by its inclusion in some Christian Spanish cookbooks as early as 1599.

== Tunisia ==
Oudnin el kadhi
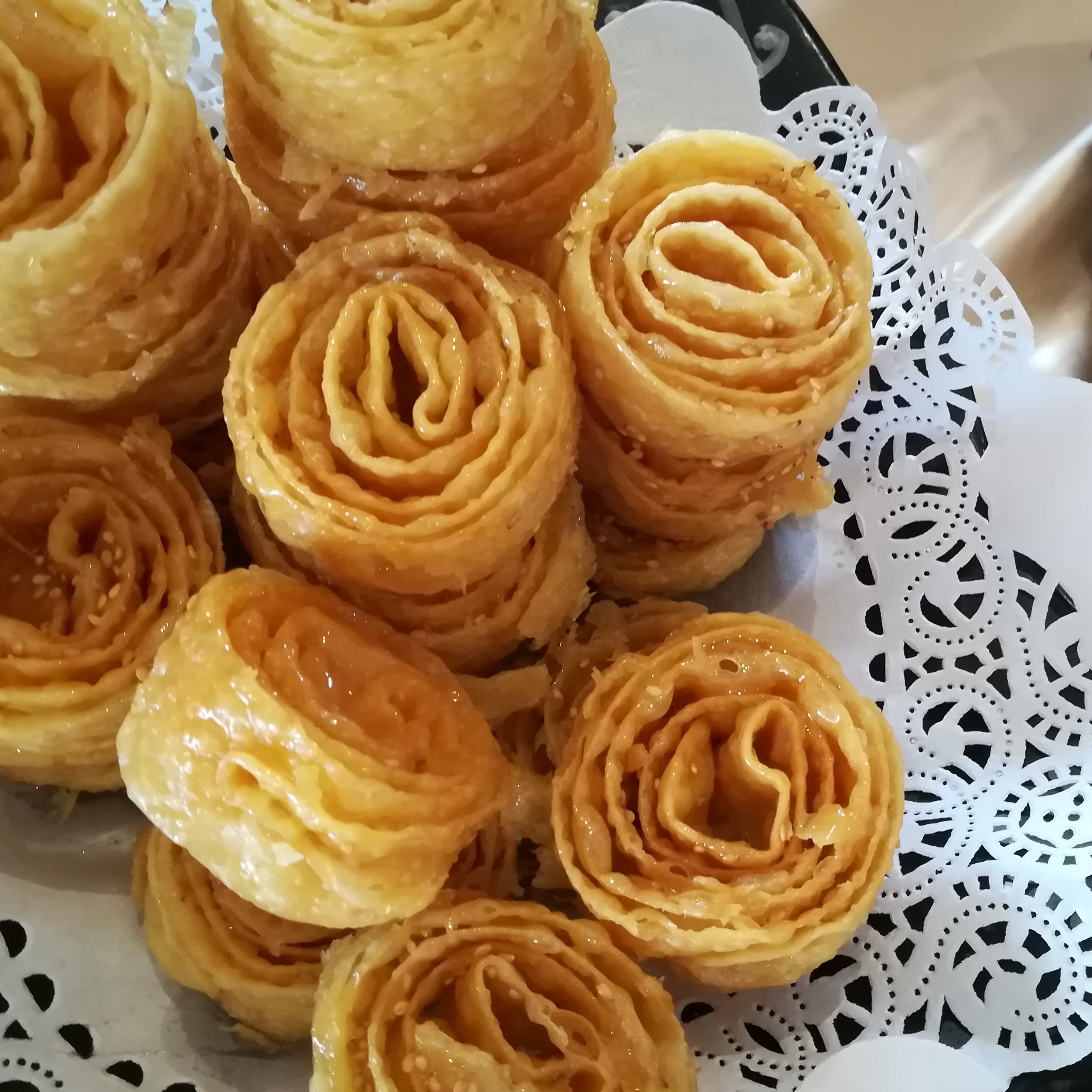
- A plate of Oudnin el kadhi
- Course: Dessert
- Place of origin: Tunisia
- Main ingredients: flour, oil, sugar, honey

Oudnin el kadhi (Tunisian Arabic: وذنين القاضي 'ears of the Judge') or wdinet el cadi (وذينات القاضي 'little ears of the judge') are a type of pastry commonly found in Tunisia.

== Preparation ==
Writing for Tablet Magazine, food historian Hélène Jawhara Piñer provides a recipe. Comprising flour, eggs, sugar, and oil, the dough is rolled thinly, cut into strips, and briefly fried. A syrup of water, orange blossom, and sugar is then prepared for additional flavor. The fazuelos are then garnished with sesame seeds or icing sugar. Turkish Jews add brandy to the dough and Moroccan Jews eat them with cinnamon and syrup. They are similar to Andalusian Pestiños, but the latter are eaten with honey.

In Tunisia, flour, eggs, oil, orange flower water, sugar and salt are mixed, and the resulting dough is rolled and cut into strips. These are then dipped in hot oil and rolled around a fork. After draining, they are coated in honey or syrup or sprinkled with powdered sugar. Sesame seeds are sometimes used as topping.

== See also ==
- Sephardi Jewish cuisine
