= Pestiños =

Andalusian sweet pastry

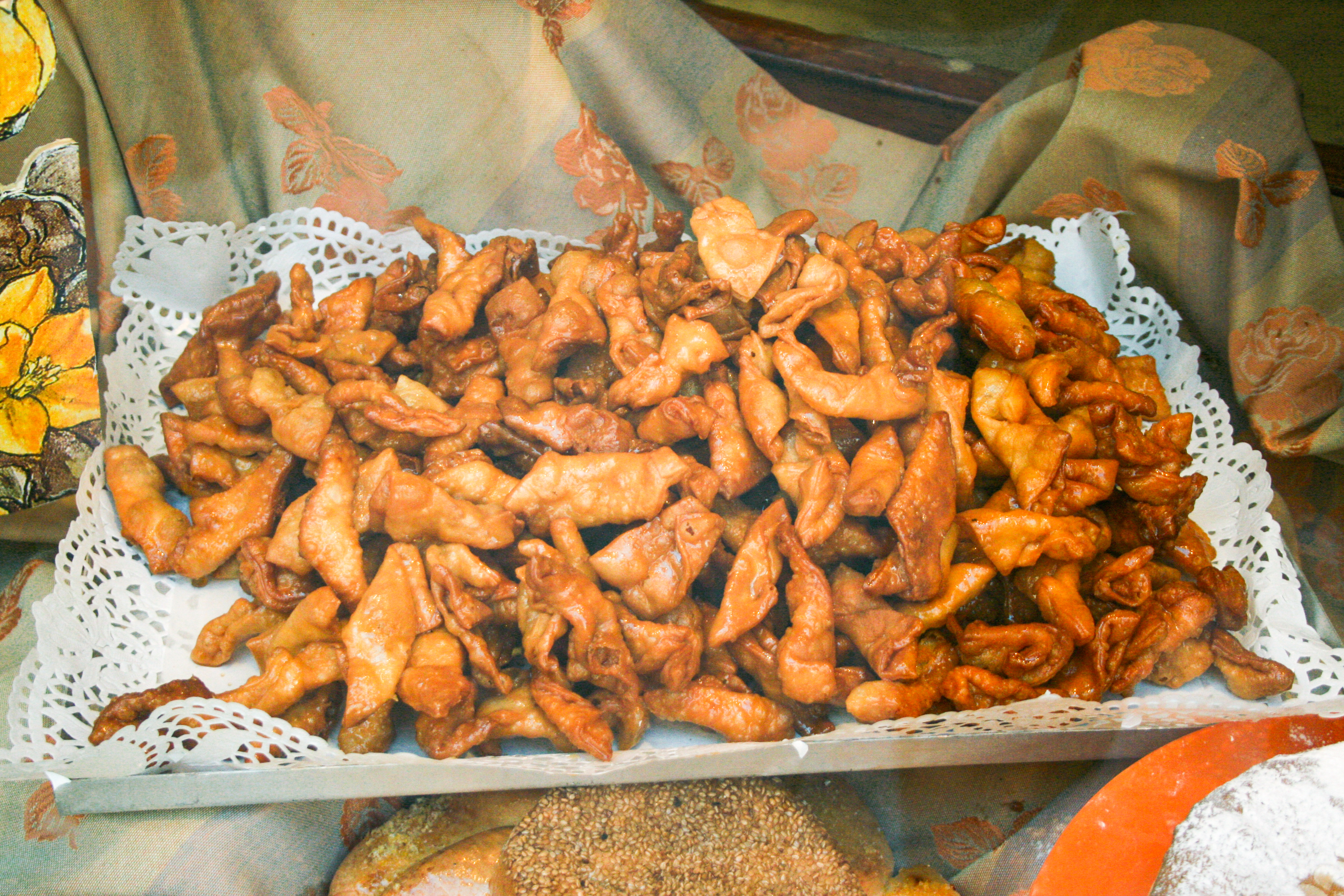
- Tray of pestiños
- Alternative names: Borrachuelos
- Type: Doughnut
- Place of origin: Spain
- Region or state: Andalusia
- Main ingredients: Dough, sesame, olive oil, honey or sugar

A pestiño is a Christmas or Holy Week pastry that is popular in Andalusia and other regions of southern Spain. It is a piece of dough, deep-fried in olive oil and glazed with honey or cinnamon sugar.

== History ==
The prestiño dates back at least to the 16th century, being mentioned in the book La Lozana Andaluza, which was written in 1528.

== Characteristics ==
Normally the dough is flavoured with sesame. Its form and composition vary from region to region and are different in Medina-Sidonia, Cádiz, Chiclana de la Frontera, Sanlúcar de Barrameda, Rota, Salobreña and other towns in Andalusia. In these towns they are typical for Christmas but in the rest of Andalusia they are eaten throughout the year.

In Málaga they are called borrachuelos.

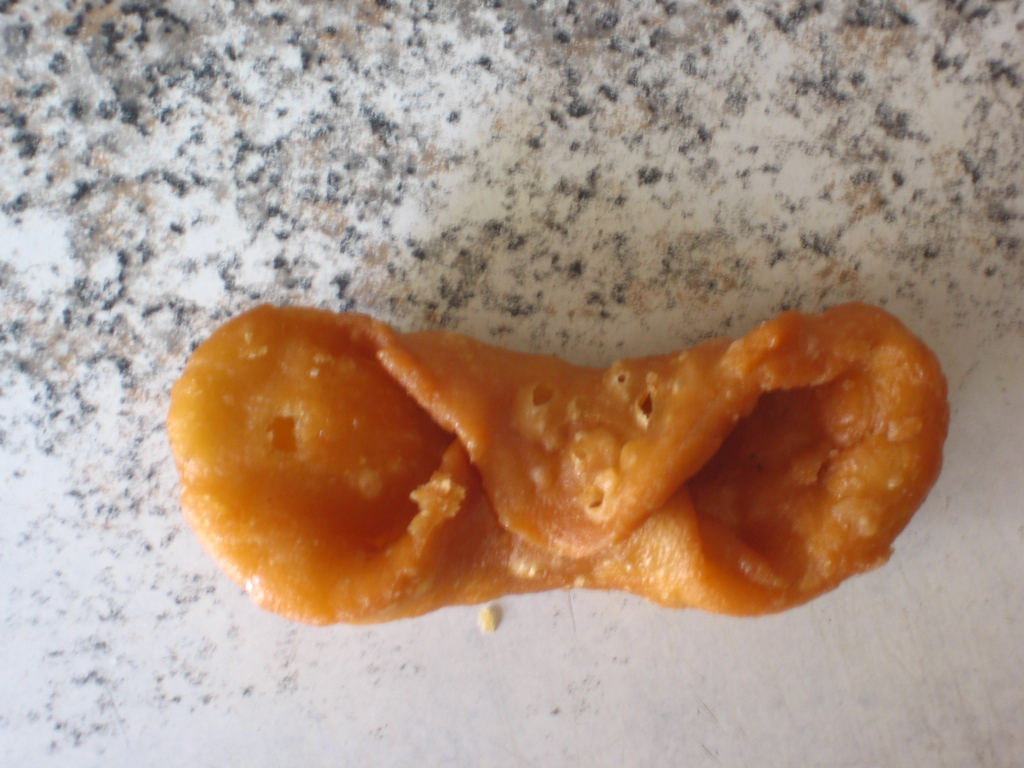

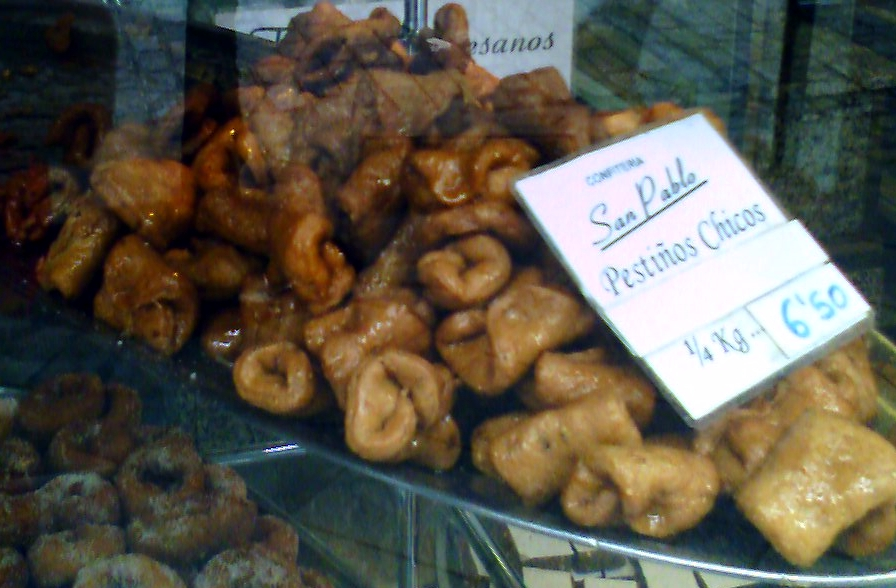
Pestiños de miel, a honey-coated sweet fritter

== See also ==
- Fazuelos
- Angel wings
- List of doughnut varieties
- List of fried dough varieties
