= Hagar Association =

Israeli educational organization

- Formation: 2006
- Headquarters: Beersheba, Israel
- Executive Director: Sam Shube
- Website: https://www.hajar.org.il/en

Hagar Association
- Beersheba; Israel

Information
- Established: 2007
- Grades: PreK-6
- Enrollment: 380 students (2023)
- Language: Arabic, Hebrew

The Hagar Association (Hebrew: לשוני בהגר, romanized: L'Shoni B'Hagar) also called Hagar – Jewish-Arab Education for Equality, is an educational organization located in Beersheba, Israel. The organization runs a bilingual school that serves both Jewish and Israeli-Arab children from preschool through sixth grade. It is the only integrated school in the Negev in southern Israel.

The organization also organizes cultural events in the community, and manages Scout Troop Adam, the country's only scouting troop with both Jewish and Arab members.

== History ==
Hagar Association was established in 2006 by Jewish and Arab community organizers and educators from Beersheba.

== Cultural events ==
In 2021, Hagar Association launched their Thaqafat initiative, which aimed to organize joint Arab-Jewish cultural events in the wider community. Events have included musical performances, poetry readings, and art exhibitions.

In March 2022, the group organized a concert in Rahat. In April, they organized a joint Iftar-Mimouna community meal.

In 2023, the group organized Beersheba Performing Arts Center's first Arab-Jewish concert.

In 2024, the group plans to stage four traveling art exhibitions with Rana, a Bedouin art center based in Rahat.

== School ==
=== Students ===
The school serves both Jewish and Arab-Israeli children, and attempts to balance enrollment so the student population is half Jewish and half Israeli-Arab.

For its first year of operation in 2007, the school only offered a kindergarten class. By 2009, the school offered preschool, kindergarten, and first grade, serving 72 students. The following year, enrollment increased to 140, with daycare, second, and third grade classes also being added. As of 2023, 380 students attended the school.

=== Education ===
Each class has a Jewish and an Arab teacher, with lessons being presented in both Hebrew and Arabic.

The school's curriculum includes lessons about shared values in Judaism, Christianity, and Islam, and field trips bring students to places of worship in the city. Holidays from the three religions and Israel's Independence Day, Nakba Day, and Yom HaShoah are all observed, with lessons focusing on universal values such as responsibility and empathy.

The school encourages students to undertake projects, such as letter-writing campaigns, to promote the equality of Hebrew and Arabic in the community.

In 2019, the school also opened the country's first "multi-age bilingual early childhood education center" with USAID financial support.

== Scout Troop Adam ==
The association launched Scout Troop Adam in 2019, numbering about a dozen children at its inception. The troop was open to any children living in Beersheba, and by 2023 the group had over a hundred members.
