= The Great Canadian Baking Show season 7 =

Television cooking show

The Great Canadian Baking Show
- Season 7
- Starring: Ann Pornel; Alan Shane Lewis; Bruno Feldeisen; Kyla Kennaley
- No. of episodes: 8

Release
- Original network: CBC Television
- Original release: October 1 – November 19, 2023

Season chronology
- ← Previous; The Great Canadian Holiday Baking Show (2022) Next → The Great Canadian Holiday Baking Show (2023)

The seventh season of The Great Canadian Baking Show premiered on CBC Television on October 1, 2023. As with previous seasons, ten amateur bakers will compete over eight weeks of challenges, vying for the title. Ann Pornel and Alan Shane Lewis return for their fourth season as hosts. Bruno Feldeisen and Kyla Kennaley return for their seventh and fifth seasons respectively as judges.

== Bakers ==
Baker	Age	Profession	Hometown
Andrew Evers	40	Public Service Manager	Toronto, ON
Andy Bui	30	Mental health nurse practitioner	Montreal, QC
Camila García Hernández	28	Software developer	Toronto, ON
Candice Riley	48	Partner at a tech firm	Brampton, ON
Heather Allen	40	Literacy educator	Winnipeg, MB
Katherine "Kathy" Neiman	57	Retired professor	Leduc, AB
Loïc Fauteux-Goulet	33	High school teacher	Creston, BC
Niv Saberi	31	Full-time parent	Port Elgin, ON
Rainier Maksoud	29	Business analyst	Laval, QC
Sydney Hayden	23	Student	Halifax, NS

== Results summary ==
Colour key:

Baker was one of the judges' least favourite bakers that week, but was not eliminated.
Baker was one of the judges' favourite bakers that week, but was not the Star Baker.
Baker got through to the next round.
Baker was eliminated.
Baker was the Star Baker.
Baker was a season runner-up.
Baker was the season winner.

Elimination chart
Baker	1	2	3	4	5	6	7	8
Loïc					SB			WINNER
Candice								Runner Up
Camila		SB					SB	Runner Up
Andrew						SB	OUT	
Heather	SB					OUT		
Kathy			SB		OUT			
Niv				OUT				
Rainier			OUT					
Sydney		OUT						
Andy	OUT							

== Episodes ==
Baker eliminated
Star Baker
Winner

=== Episode 1: Cake Week ===
For their first signature challenge, the bakers were given two hours to create a roll cake with a distinct pattern baked into the sponge cake. In the technical challenge set by Kyla, the bakers had an hour and 45 minutes to bake a Boston cream pie. For the showstopper, the bakers had three and a half hours to make a top-forward cake - a decorated cake that stands on its side.

Baker	Signature (Patterned roll cake)	Technical (Boston cream pie)	Showstopper (Top-forward cake)
Andrew	A Taste of the Falls Roll Cake	8th	Fish Bowl Cake
Andy	Fallen Greek Column Roll Cake	10th	Did not compete
Camila	Bocadillo Con Queso Roll Cake	6th	World Traveler Cake
Candice	Spring Roll Cake	1st	Bizz-Buzz Cake
Heather	Ancient Scroll Roll Cake	3rd	Prairie Skies Cake
Kathy	Swirls and Whirls Roll Cake	4th	Choose a Hue Cake
Loïc	Treasure Map Roll Cake	2nd	A Cake with a View
Niv	Rock 'n' Roll Cake	5th	Koala's Paradise Cake
Rainier	Evil Eye Roll Cake	9th	Ocean Waves Cake
Sydney	Poppy the Bunny Roll Cake	7th	Dream Come True Cake

=== Episode 2: Bread Week ===
For the signature challenge, the bakers were given 1 hour and 45 minutes bake a loaf of cornbread, enhanced with unique flavours, and accompanied with a condiment made by the bakers. For the technical challenge set by Kyla, the bakers had to make a rosca de reyes, "Three Kings Bread", crowned with candied fruit and decorated with coloured cookie stripes, in 2 hours. For the showstopper, inspired by the Cheung Chau Bun Festival in Hong Kong, the bakers had four hours to bake a "Festival of Buns" consisting of a tower of 24 individual buns, with 12 buns each in two different flavours and with distinct appearances.

Baker	Signature (Cornbread loaf)	Technical (Rosca de reyes)	Showstopper (Festival of Buns)
Andrew	Make Your Marc Cornbread	9th	Anniversary Tower
Camila	Cornbread con Chili	1st	Advent Tower
Candice	Chicken Dinner Cornbread	6th	Tanzanian Picnic
Heather	Three Sisters Cornbread	2nd	Bumble Buns & Bun-Shroom Tower
Kathy	Ode to Mexican Street Corn	3rd	Flower Tower
Loïc	Drunk & Corny Cornbread	5th	Tree of A-Bun-Dance
Niv	Persian Cornbread	7th	Monkeying Around the Banana Tree
Rainier	Mediterranean Cornbread	8th	Bridal Shower Tower
Sydney	Seaside Cornbread on the Cob	4th	Surf & Turf Tower

=== Episode 3: Cookie Week ===
For the signature challenge, the bakers were given 2 hours to bake a dozen embroidery cookies, carefully piped cookies decorated with royal icing to resemble embroidered patterns. For the technical challenge set by Bruno, the bakers had 1 hour and 30 minutes to bake 12 kaâk nakache, sculpted ring-shaped cookies from Algeria, flavoured with orange blossom water, cinnamon, and cloves, filled with spiced date paste, and decorated with a crimping pattern. For the showstopper, the bakers had three hours and 30 minutes to make a cookie layer cake, consisting of at least four layers, and alternating layers of any type of cookie and filling.

Baker	Signature (12 Embroidery cookies)	Technical (12 Kaâk nakache)	Showstopper (Cookie layer cake)
Andrew	Cookie Cocktail	7th	Big Ol' Carrot
Camila	Cumbia Cookies	4th	Berry Tasty Macaron Sandwich
Candice	Sugar, Spice, My Family is Nice Cookies	5th	Back in Time for Trifle
Heather	Plums for Oma	1st	Midnight Snack Cookie Cake
Kathy	Cuppa Tea Cookies	3rd	Out of the Box Cookies n' Lox
Loïc	Ode to William Morris	2nd	Macaron Charlotte
Niv	Cookie Tapestry	8th	Orchard of Cookies
Rainier	Proud Peacock Cookies	6th	Tall, Dark, & Mysterious Cookie Cake

=== Episode 4: Harvest Week ===
For the first ever Harvest Week, the bakers were given 1 hour and 45 minutes to produce 8 pide, a yeast-based Turkish stuffed flatbread, with a vegetable-based filling, for their signature challenge. In the technical challenge set by Bruno, the bakers had to make a dozen thousand-layer taro mooncakes, a Chinese dessert commonly enjoyed during the Mid-Autumn Festival, in 2 hours and 15 minutes. The variation calls for a flaky spiral layered crust with two different doughs and a taro and salted duck egg yolk filling. For the showstopper, the bakers had three hours to make a fruit tile tart, decorating the tart with a precise and eyecatching geometric design made of fruit tiles set upon two layers of filling.

Baker	Signature (8 Pide)	Technical (12 Thousand-layer taro mooncakes)	Showstopper (Fruit tile tart)
Andrew	Party Favourite Pide	5th	Fruit Explosion Tart
Camila	French Onion Pide	2nd	Sunny Day Salpicón Tart
Candice	Asparagus-Obsessed Pide	4th	Tropical Dream Tart
Heather	Home-Grown Harvest Pide	1st	Northern Lights Fruit Tart
Kathy	Peppy Pepper Pide	3rd	Crickets & Quilts Fruit Tart
Loïc	Wild Harvest Pide	7th	Throwback Tile Tart
Niv	Kashke Bademjan Pide	6th	Nuclear Trefoil Fruit Tart

=== Episode 5: Old School Week ===
For the signature challenge, the bakers were tasked with making 10 toaster pastries in 2 hours. For the technical challenge set by Kyla, the bakers had two and a half hours to make a knafeh, a Middle East dessert with a Palestinian origin, made of strips of phyllo-like dough, a filling of roasted pistachios and akkawi cheese, and soaked in a rose water syrup. In the showstopper, the bakers had 4 hours to produce a two-tiered kitsch cake - highly decorated cakes with elaborately piped buttercream.

Baker	Signature (10 Toaster pastries)	Technical (Knafeh)	Showstopper (Kitsch cake)
Andrew	Chocolate Orange Stocking Stuffer	6th	Nifty Shake Shoppe Kitsch Cake
Camila	Mango Chamoy Toaster Pastry	4th	Break the Mold Kitsch Cake
Candice	Falling for Pumpkin Spice Latte Toaster Pastry	3rd	Night at the Opera Kitsch Cake
Heather	Weihnachsmarkt Toaster Pastry	5th	Forest of Love Kitsch Cake
Kathy	Bologna for Breakfast Pastry	2nd	Groovy 70's Kitsch Cake
Loïc	Rad Mixtape Toaster Pastry	1st	Kitchiest of Birds Cake

=== Episode 6: Spice Week ===
For the first-ever Spice Week, the bakers had 2 hours to bake ras malai cake slices, a modern adaptation of ras malai with an eggless sponge cake soaked in a spiced milk and incorporating chhena soaked in spiced malai, for their signature challenge. For the technical challenge, the bakers had to make 12 Jamaican patties in 2 hours. In the showstopper, the bakers had 4 hours to build a cookie architectural wonder, a structure constructed from two types of spice-forward cookies.

Baker	Signature (Ras malai cake)	Technical (12 Jamaican patties)	Showstopper (Spice cookie architectural wonder)
Andrew	Raspberry Saffron Ras Malai Cake	4th	Dutch Treat
Camila	Chocolate with Cheese Ras Malai Cake	2nd	Balcony in Bogotá
Candice	Masala Chai Ras Malai Cake	5th	Faces of Home
Heather	Crab Apple Ras Malai Cake	3rd	Notions & Potions Shop
Loïc	Horchata Ras Malai Cake	1st	Cookie Frigate

=== Episode 7: Patisserie Week ===
For the signature challenge, the bakers had 2 hours and 15 minutes to bake 10 religieuse. In the technical challenge set by Bruno, the bakers had to make a postre chajá, an Uruguayan cake with layers of peach syrup soaked sponge and chantilly cream, and decorated with crunchy meringue and poached peach slices, in 2 hours and 15 minutes. In the showstopper, the bakers had 4 hours to make an entremet display, consisting of 24 entremets in two different flavours.

Baker	Signature (10 Religieuse)	Technical (Postre chajá)	Showstopper (Entremet display)
Andrew	Doggone Religieuses	4th	Beach Day Entremets
Camila	Ribbiting Religieuses	3rd	Bird's Nest Entremets
Candice	Welsh Rabbit Religieuses	1st	Wine 'n' Dine Entremets
Loïc	Fun Guy Fungi Religieuses	2nd	Critter-ful Entremets

=== Episode 8: Finale ===
For the signature challenge, the bakers had 2 hours to bake a torta diplomatica, or a diplomatic cake, an Italian dessert made of layers of puff pastry, ladyfingers, and creme diplomat. In the technical challenge, the bakers had to make a passion fruit mille-crêpe cake, with creme légère between layers, in 2 hours. As an additional challenge, the crepes were to be layered in an ombré fade pattern with the darkest layer at the bottom to lightest at the top, with a larger crepe to wrap around the entire cake and a tempered white chocolate collar. In the showstopper, the bakers had four and a half hours to create an anti-gravity cake, an illusion cake which appears to be suspended through concealed supports.

Baker	Signature (Torta diplomatica)	Technical (Passion fruit mille-crêpes cake)	Showstopper (Anti-Gravity cake)
Camila	Coffee & Caramel Torta Diplomatica	3rd	Life Story
Candice	Apple Pie Torta Diplomatica	1st	Family Garden
Loïc	Backyard Torta Diplomatica	2nd	Underwater Oasis
