= The Great Canadian Holiday Baking Show =

Television cooking show

The Great Canadian Holiday Baking Show is a Christmas special edition of The Great Canadian Baking Show. Episodes have featured bakers from previous seasons of The Great Canadian Baking Show competing in season baking challenges to be named "Star Holiday Baker", along with additional bakers from previous seasons performing as musical guests. Four episodes of The Great Canadian Holiday Baking Show have aired, in 2019, 2021, 2022, and 2023 respectively.

== 2019 ==
The Great Canadian Holiday Baking Show
- Starring: Carolyn Taylor; Aurora Browne; Bruno Feldeisen; Kyla Kennaley
- No. of episodes: 1

Release
- Original network: CBC Television
- Original release: November 13, 2019

Season chronology
- ← Previous; Season 3 Next → Season 4

The first episode of The Great Canadian Holiday Baking Show aired on November 13, 2019. It featured four bakers from the show's first two seasons returning to compete in seasonal baking challenges.

This marked the final episode of hosts Carolyn Taylor and Aurora Browne in their presenting roles.

=== Bakers ===
Baker	Age	Profession	Hometown	Notes
James Hoyland	47	Physics professor	Richmond, BC	Season 1 semifinalist
Megan Stasiewich	31	Hairstylist	Leduc, AB	Season 2 finalist
Timothy Fu	20	Medical student	Edmonton, AB	Season 2 quarterfinalist
Vandana Jain	38	Chief financial officer	Regina, SK	Season 1 finalist

=== Bakes ===
For the signature challenge, the bakers had two and a half hours to produce 12 edible ornament cookies. The technical challenge gave the bakers three hours to create a challah and accompany it with homemade butter and apple butter. The bakers' showstopper challenge was to construct an elaborate, edible, and structurally-sound Christmas village in four hours.

Baker	Signature (12 Cookie ornaments)	Technical (Challah)	Showstopper (Edible Christmas village)
James	Spiked Holiday Cookie Cards	3rd	Village of the Nisse
Megan	Christmas Cookie Balls	2nd	Christmas on the Slopes
Timothy	Alpaca Santa & His Loyal Elves	1st	Fort Santa
Vandana	Holiday Sparkle Cookie Ornaments	4th	Holiday Village by the Sea

== 2021 ==
The Great Canadian Holiday Baking Show
- Starring: Ann Pornel; Alan Shane Lewis; Bruno Feldeisen; Kyla Kennaley
- No. of episodes: 1

Release
- Original network: CBC Television
- Original release: December 12, 2021

Season chronology
- ← Previous; Season 5 Next → Season 6

A second episode of The Great Canadian Holiday Baking Show aired on December 12, 2021. It featured four finalists from the show's first three seasons returning to compete in seasonal baking challenges.

Ann Pornel and Alan Shane Lewis, the hosts since season 4 of The Great Canadian Baking Show, appeared as presenters.

=== Bakers ===
Baker	Age	Profession	Hometown	Notes
Linda Longson	67	Payroll supervisor	High River, AB	Season 1 finalist
Sachin Seth	46	Dentist and dental professor	Halifax, NS	Season 2 finalist
Jodi Robson	35	Table games dealer	Regina, SK	Season 3 finalist
Colin Asuncion	32	Marketing manager	Toronto, ON	Season 3 finalist

=== Bakes ===
For the signature challenge, the bakers had to make a festive baking tray with two different types of desserts in two and a half hours. The technical challenge gave the bakers one hour and 45 minutes to make a vínarterta, a seven layered cake of alternating layers of almond biscuit and prune jam, originally brought to Manitoba by Icelandic settlers. The bakers' showstopper challenge was to create a choux wreath with incredible flavours and elaborate decorations in four hours.

Baker	Signature (Festive baking tray)	Technical (Manitoba vínarterta)	Showstopper (Choux wreath)
Linda	'Tis the Season Shortbread Tray	4th	Holly Jolly Christmas Wreath
Sachin	Come in from the Cold Sweet Tray	1st	Carolling at Christmas Wreath
Jodi	Festive Gingerbread Forest Treats	3rd	Hors D'Oeuvres Wreath
Colin	Sugar and Spice Goodie Tray	2nd	Woodland Wreath

== 2022 ==
The Great Canadian Holiday Baking Show
- Starring: Ann Pornel; Alan Shane Lewis; Bruno Feldeisen; Kyla Kennaley
- No. of episodes: 1

Release
- Original network: CBC Television
- Original release: November 27, 2022

Season chronology
- ← Previous; Season 6 Next → Season 7

A third episode of The Great Canadian Holiday Baking Show aired on November 27, 2022. The episode featured returning bakers from the second, fourth, and fifth seasons to compete in seasonal baking challenges.

Ann Pornel and Alan Shane Lewis returned as presenters.

=== Bakers ===
Baker	Age	Profession	Hometown	Notes
Mengling Chen	34	Market research account manager	Toronto, ON	Season 2 semifinalist
Mahathi Mundluru	26	Marketing specialist	Markham, ON	Season 4 finalist
Stephen Nhan	31	Healthcare assessor	Regina, SK	Season 5 semifinalist
Steve Levitt	55	Small business owner	Aurora, ON	Season 5 finalist

=== Bakes ===
In the signature challenge, the bakers had two hours to make 18 savoury appetizers, 9 each of two different types for a holiday party platter. For the technical challenge, they were tasked with baking 20 gefüllte herzen, traditional German heart-shaped soft gingerbread cookies, with a layer of thick raspberry jam within, coated in dark chocolate and drizzled with white chocolate, in 2 hours and 15 minutes. For the showstopper, the bakers were given four hours to create a grand holiday scene cake, telling any holiday story or tradition, with the bakers being allowed to use any technique and additional bakes.

Baker	Signature (Holiday party platter)	Technical (Gefüllte Herzen)	Showstopper (Holiday scene cake)
Mengling	Cheesy Christmas Platter	3rd	Chinese New Year Cake
Mahathi	Elegant Indian Street Food Platter	2nd	Rooted in Two Traditions Cake
Stephen	Nordic Canapes	1st	Icelandic Snow Globe Cake
Steve	Apps-olutely Festive Family Platter	4th	It's a Wonderful Cake

== 2023 ==
The Great Canadian Holiday Baking Show
- Starring: Ann Pornel; Alan Shane Lewis; Bruno Feldeisen; Kyla Kennaley
- No. of episodes: 1

Release
- Original network: CBC Television
- Original release: November 26, 2023

Season chronology
- ← Previous; Season 7 Next → Season 8

A fourth episode of The Great Canadian Holiday Baking Show aired on November 26, 2023. The episode featured four previous winners from the second, third, fourth, and fifth seasons, returning for a chance to become a Star Holiday Baker.

Ann Pornel and Alan Shane Lewis returned as presenters.

=== Bakers ===
Baker	Age	Profession	Hometown	Notes
Andrei Godoroja	63	Software company co-owner	Vancouver, BC	Season 2 winner
Nataliia Shevchenko	37	Customer account administrator	Edmonton, AB	Season 3 winner
Raufikat Oyawoye	37	IT business analyst	Milton, ON	Season 4 winner
Vincent Chan	57	Graphic designer	Mississauga, ON	Season 5 winner

=== Bakes ===
For the signature challenge, the bakers had 2 hours and 15 minutes to bake a tart with the theme of "cookies and milk" for Santa Claus, with "cookies" being used in any way in the bake and "milk" being any dairy product. In the technical challenge, they were tasked with making 12 sufganiyot, deep-fried doughnuts traditionally made for Hanukkah, with half filled with strawberry jam and half filled with custard pastry cream, in 1 hour and 45 minutes. For the showstopper, the bakers were given 4 hours and 15 minutes to create a baking gift exchange, featuring elaborate desserts hidden inside handmade cookie boxes decorated for the season.

Baker	Signature (Cookies and milk tart)	Technical (12 Sufganiyot)	Showstopper (Baking gift exchange)
Andrei	Milky Way Tart	1st	Mini Italian Bakeshop
Nataliia	Cookies & Eggnog Tart	3rd	Ukrainian Tribute
Raufikat	Jammy & Creamy Tart	2nd	Fruity & Nutty Jewelry Box
Vincent	Fortune Cookie Tart	4th	Warm & Frosty Holiday Gift

== 2026 ==
The Great Canadian Holiday Baking Show
- Starring: Ann Pornel; Alan Shane Lewis; Bruno Feldeisen; Kyla Kennaley
- No. of episodes: 1

Release
- Original network: CBC Television
- Original release: November 29, 2026

Season chronology
- ← Previous; Season 10

A fifth episode of The Great Canadian Holiday Baking Show is set to air on November 29, 2026. The episode will feature four previous bakers from the first, fourth, seventh, and ninth seasons, each joined by a junior family member in the first-ever multi-generational special for the show. The pairs will compete together in three challenges for a chance to become the show's first family Star Bakers.

Ann Pornel and Alan Shane Lewis will return as presenters.

=== Bakers ===
Bakers	Relationship	Hometown	Notes
Vandana Jain & Niam	Parent and child	Regina, SK	Season 1 finalist (Vandana)
Raufikat Oyawoye & Fadilah	Parent and child	Milton, ON	Season 4 winner (Raufikat)
Andrew Evers & Beau	Uncle and nephew	Toronto, ON	Season 7 semifinalist (Andrew)
Jo Mandet & Margot	Parent and child	Vancouver, BC	Season 9 winner (Jo)
