= Friand =

Small almond cake

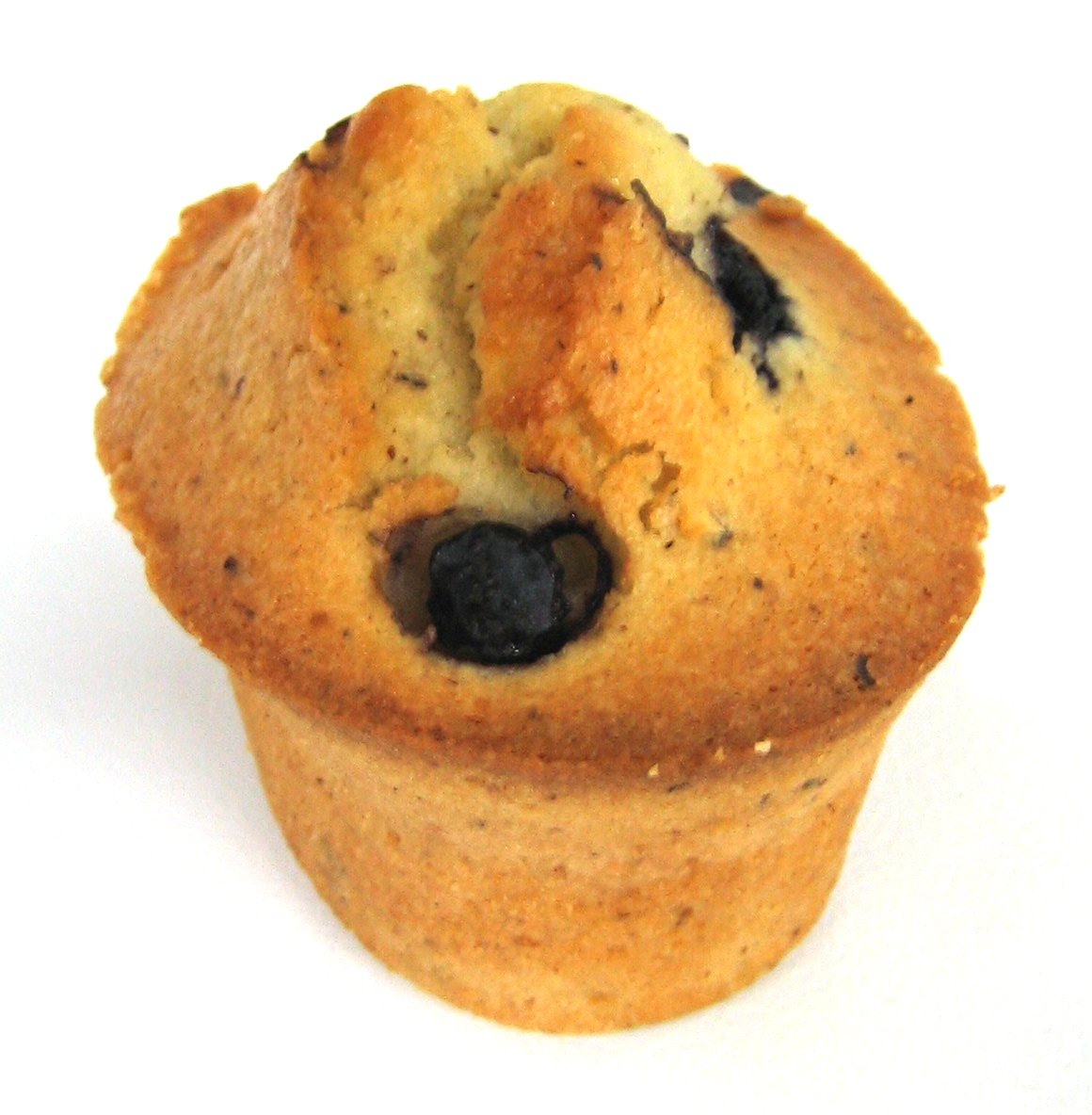
- A blueberry friand
- Type: Cake
- Main ingredients: Beurre noisette; almond flour, egg whites, sugar

A friand is a small almond cake.

The principal ingredients are almond flour, egg whites, butter, and powdered sugar. A friand typically has additional flavorings such as coconut, chocolate, fruit, and nuts. It is baked in small moulds, typically oval or barquette in shape. French financiers do not have additional flavorings.

In French, a friand, which literally means 'a tasty item' or 'something delicious', generally refers to sausage, cheese, herbs or other stuffing baked in puff pastry. The word is not generally used to refer to an almond cake. See the wiktionary entry for friand.

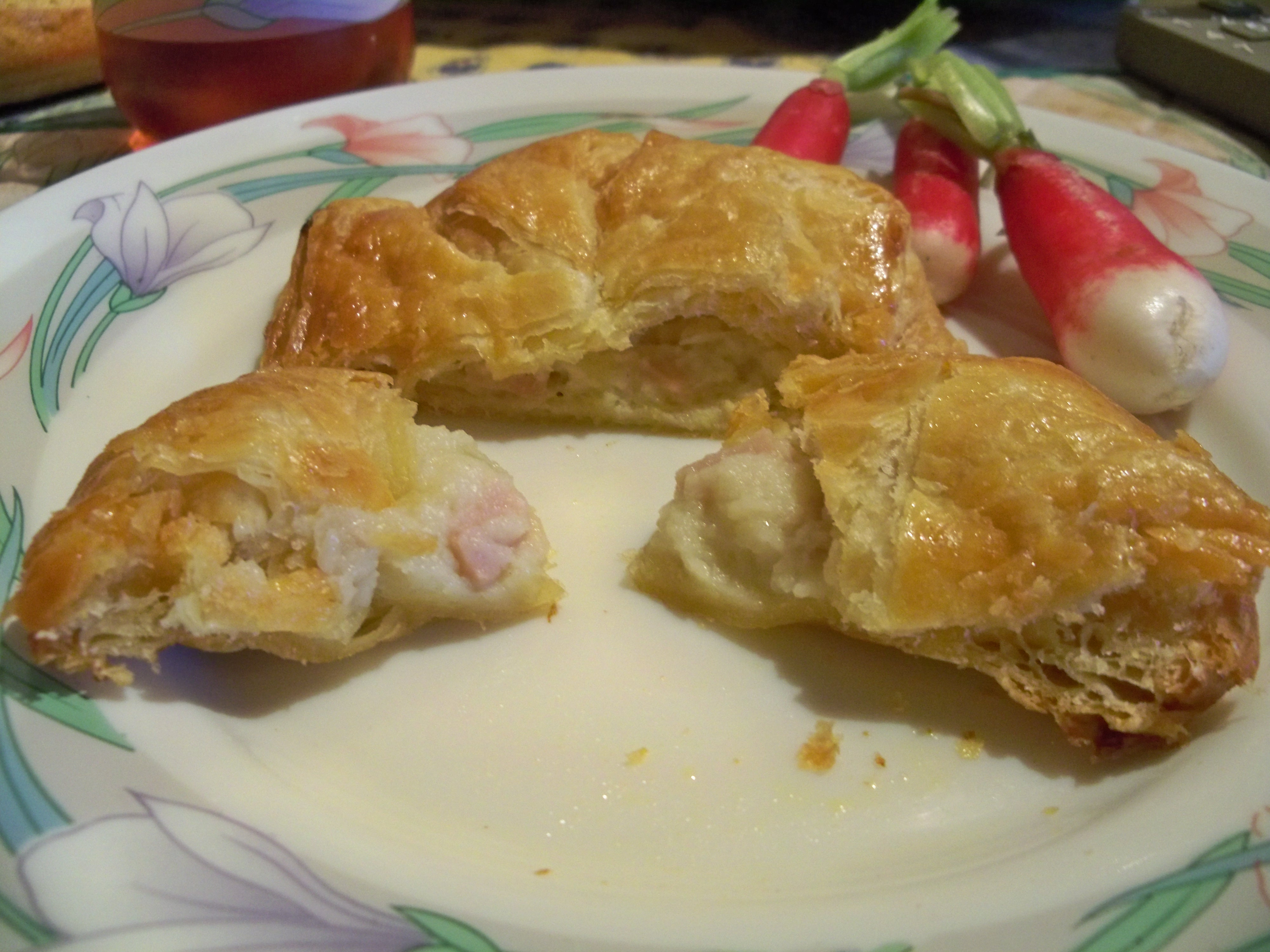
A ham and cheese friand

== See also ==
- List of almond dishes
