= Shebakia =

Pastry of Moroccan and Algerian origin

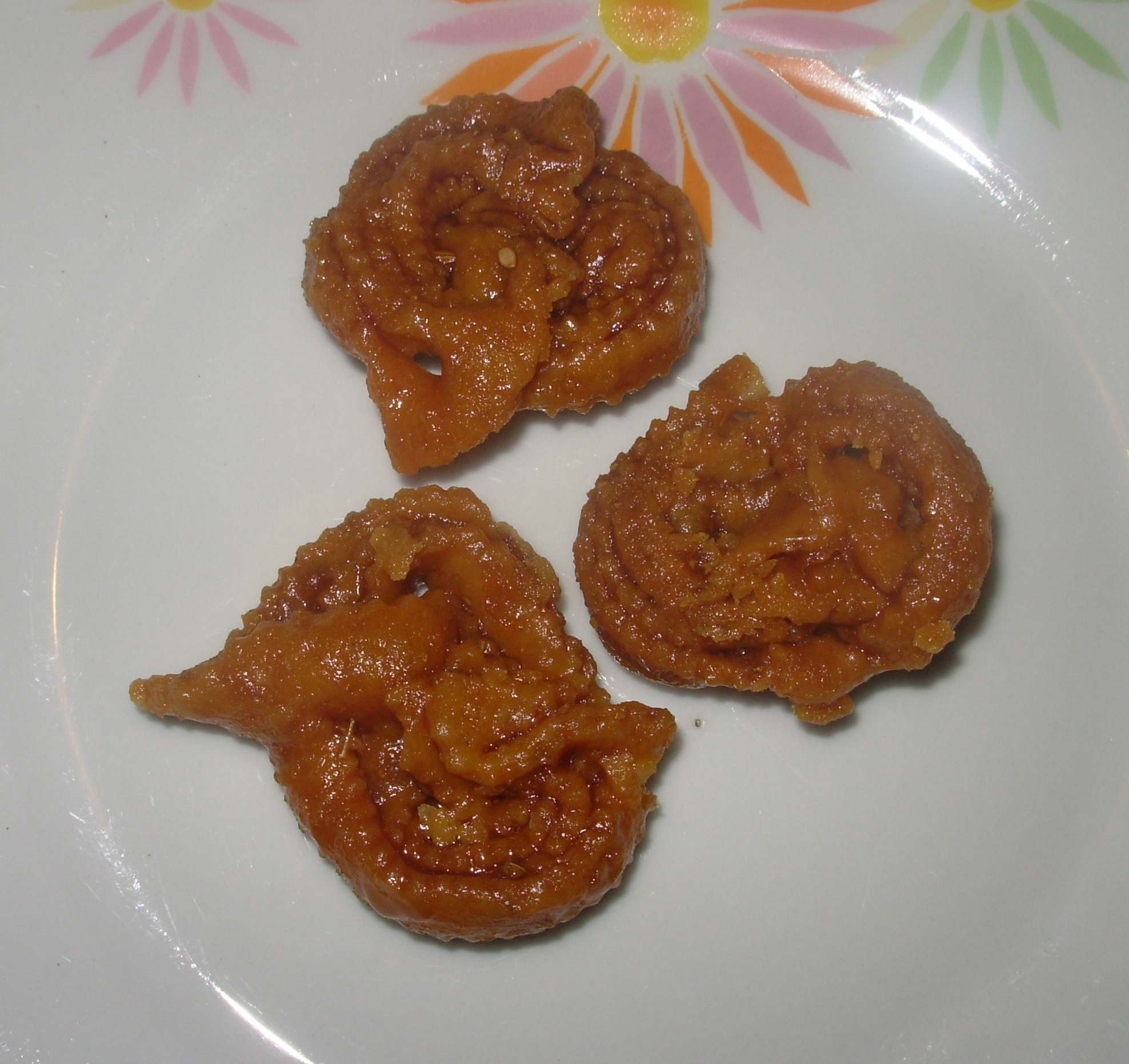
- Type: Dessert
- Place of origin: Ottoman Empire
- Region or state: Maghreb
- Main ingredients: Dough, honey, and orange blossom water

Shebakia (Arabic: شباكية) or chebakia, also known as griwech or griouech, is a Maghrebi sweet pastry made of strips of dough rolled to resemble a rose, deep-fried until golden, then coated with a syrup made of honey and orange blossom water and sprinkled with sesame. It is typically consumed during Ramadan and religious celebrations. Chebakia is from the Ottoman desserts culture.

Chebakia is made using yeast spiced with anise, cinnamon, and saffron. The dough is made from ground sesame seeds mixed with flour and maybe squeezed through a pastry tube or twisted by hand to achieve the flower-like shape. It is then fried like a doughnut. The pastry is often produced in large batches at the start of Ramadan. Although it is sweet and is often paired with coffee and tea, Moroccans also eat chebakia with spicy food such as harira.

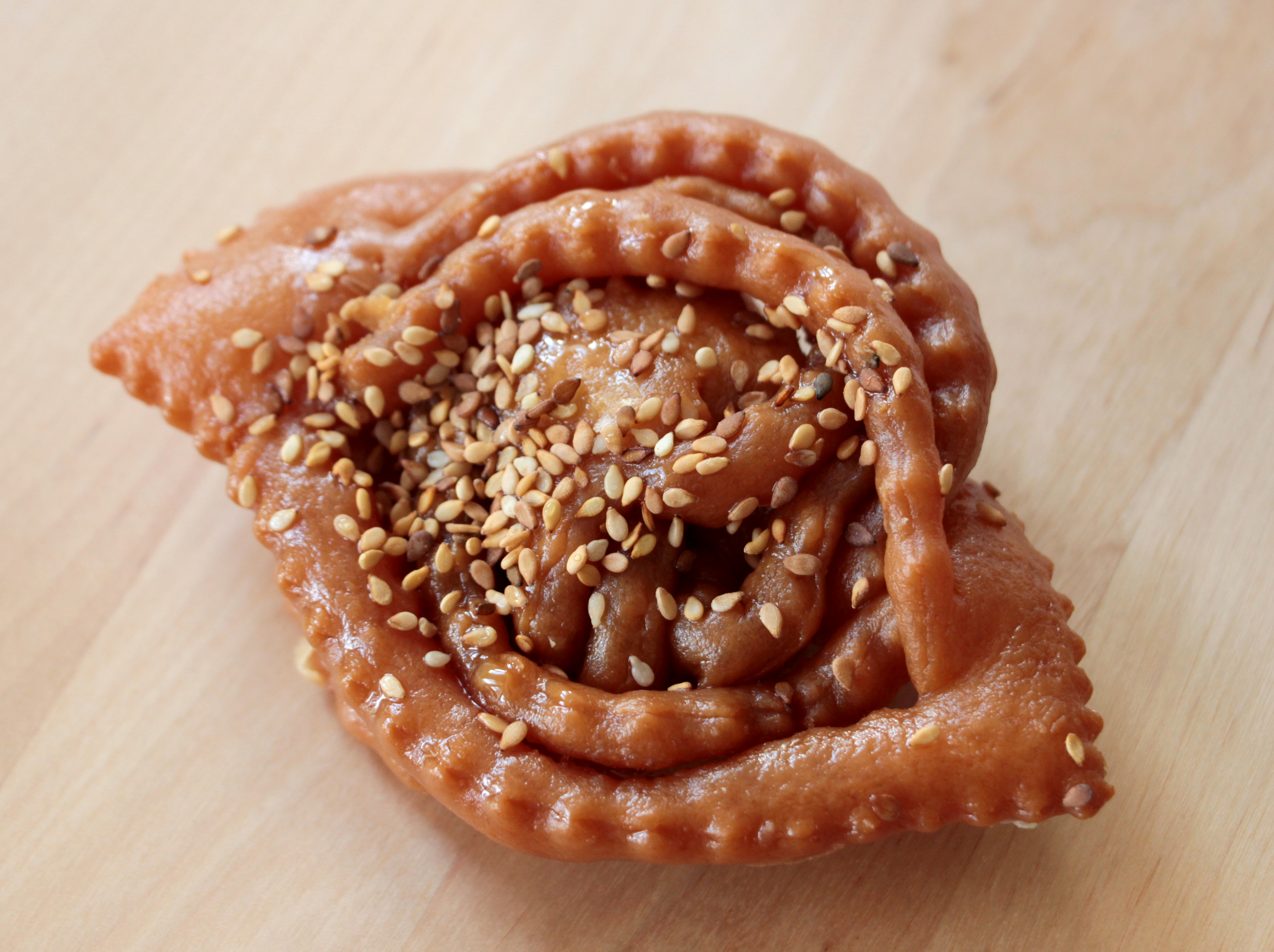
Griouech

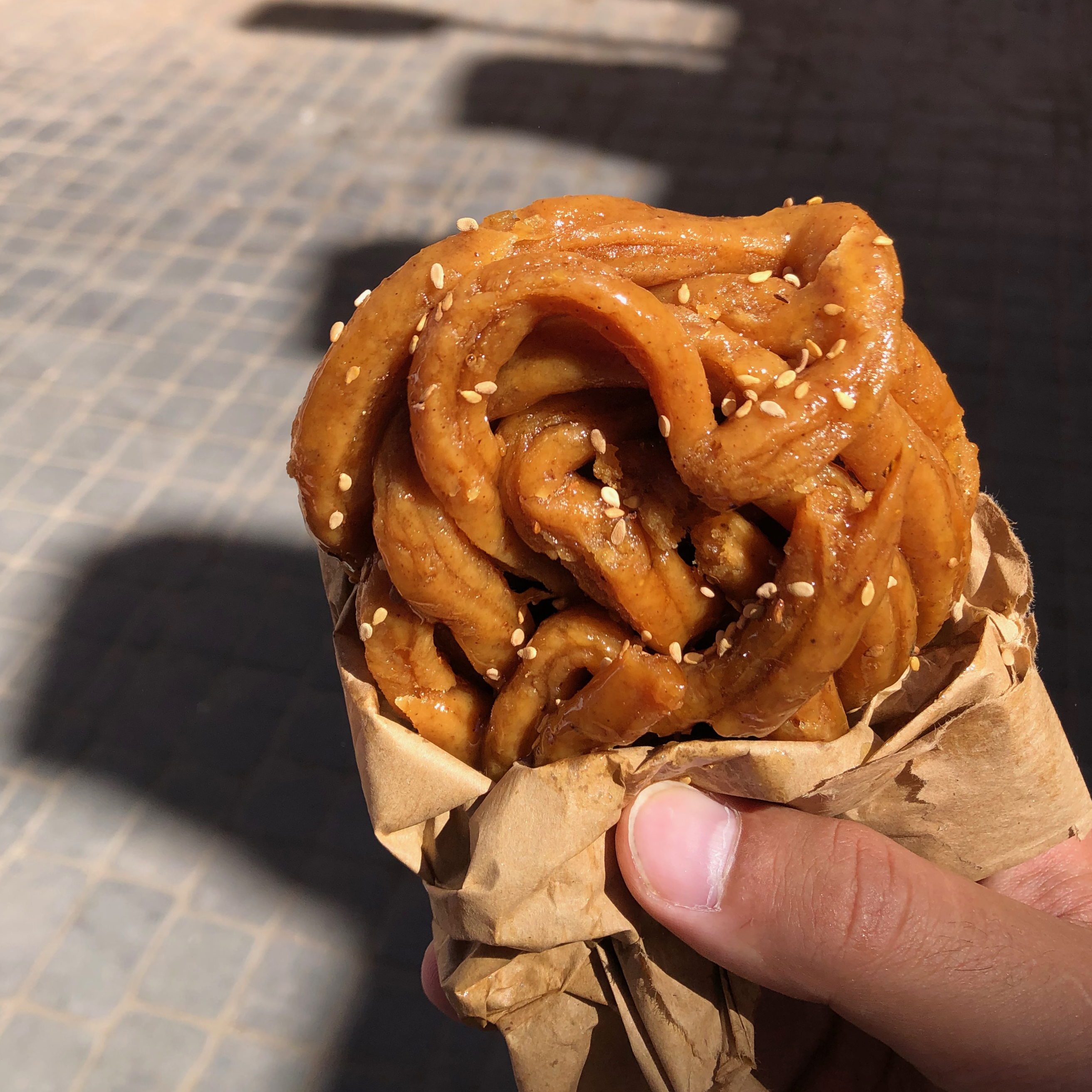
A massive shebakia in Marrakesh.

Similar pastries include cartellates and fazuelos, though the latter are constructed differently, and are thinner, less dense and from different regions.

== Names and origin ==
=== Etymology ===
The names of Chebbakia, and its size, shape and exact ingredient may vary by region. In Algeria and in Fez, Morocco, it's known as griwech (Moroccan Arabic: ڭريوش or Algerian Arabic: قريوش). In Rabat, as mkherqa (مخرقة). In Salé, as El-qli (القلي). In Ouezzane as lahlou (الحلو), and in some other Moroccan region as kliwech (كليوش).

=== History ===
The origin of this pastry is likely Ottoman, due to its similarity to Eastern pastries such as baklawa in former Ottoman areas, and meshbek in Syria also known as zalabiyeh.

In Algeria it is known as griwech and is well-known in Oran, according to some its origins date back to the city of Tiaret. Griwech is mentioned among the sweets eaten in the Eid tradition during the Ottoman Algerian period. The people would wear their finest clothes embroidered in gold and silver, after the Eid prayer relatives would visit each other and a confectionery of sweets would be offered including griwech which would be served along with coffee or sherbet.

In Morocco, a folk origin story claims that chebbakia was invented by an ambulant pastry merchant, who fell in love with a beautiful girl he saw every day at her window, and decided to make honeyed pastries in the shape of her window (Arabic: شباك, shubbak), to give her as a gift.

== See also ==
- List of pastries
