= Rumpelnacht =

Ashkenazi Jewish holiday

Rumpelnacht (translated: Night of Chaos or Night of Transition) is a term used by some Ashkenazi Jews for the night of 22 Nisan (the evening after the seventh day of Passover in Israel) or the night of 23 Nisan (the evening after the last day of Passover outside of Israel).

The expression in German means "Night of Transition", and it refers to the packing and storing of Passover utensils, and simultaneously the return of Chametz utensils into the home for use. The term "Rumpelnacht", which means "Night of Chaos", expresses the end of the Passover holiday in contrast to "Seder Night", which is the beginning of Passover. This night has earned a special nickname because it is characterized by urgency and special swiftness. Many families hurry to store the Passover utensils before bringing any Chametz into their homes. Therefore, on the evening after the holiday, they do not eat Chametz unless they go out to eat outside their home. In Germany, the end of the 'Rumpel' was marked by drinking beer.
