= Hélène Jawhara Piñer =

French-Spanish historian

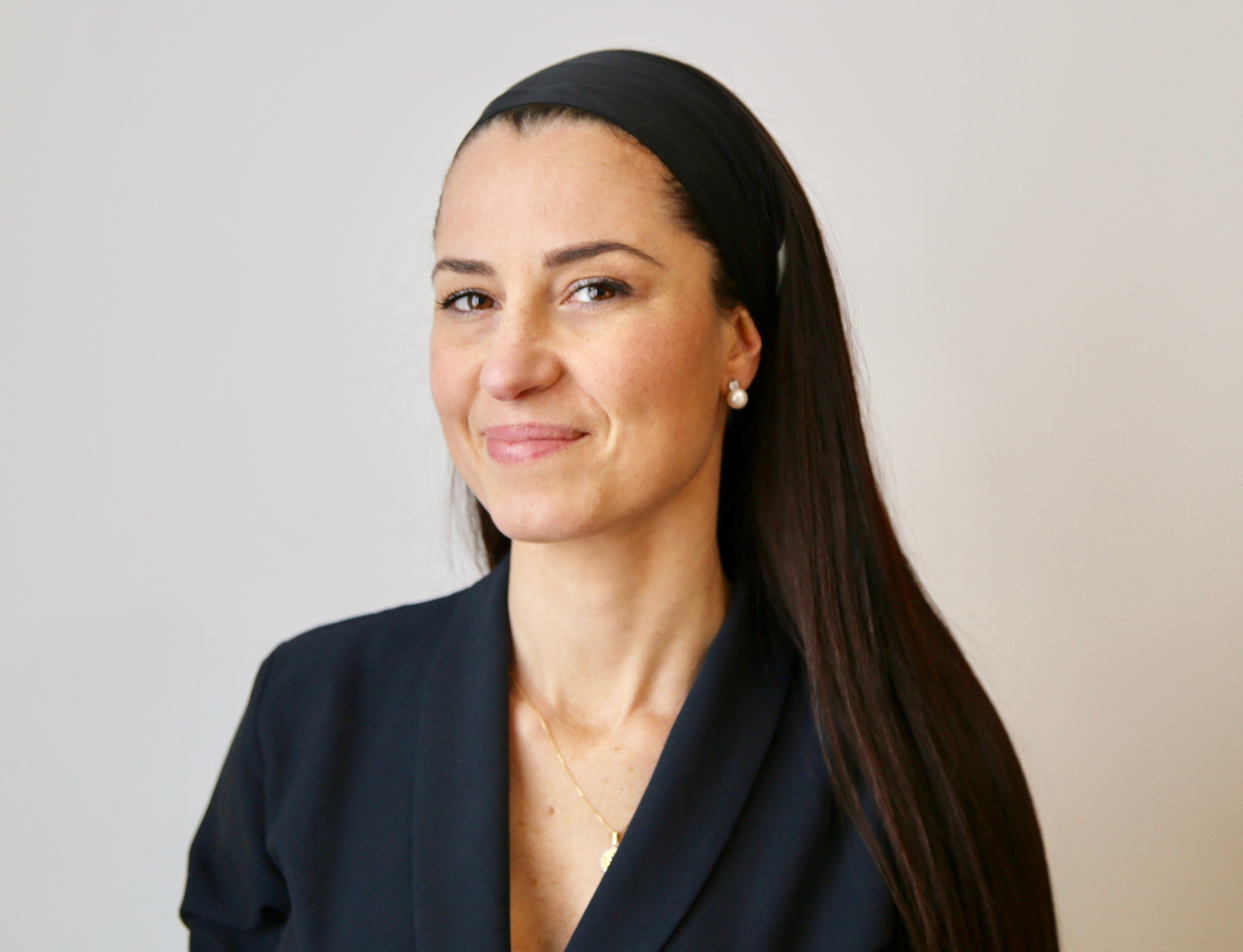
- Education: Ph.D. in Medieval History and History of Food
- Alma mater: University of Tours
- Occupations: Historian, educator, and chef
- Website: helenejawharapiner.com

Hélène Jawhara Piñer is a French-Spanish historian, educator, and chef. She is the author of a cookbook on Sephardic cuisine and a study of medieval Jewish food culture in Spain and France. She has published articles and recipes in English, French, and Spanish in magazines and academic journals, and has lectured in cooking programs on the Sephardic culinary heritage among diasporic communities in Europe and in North and South America. She specializes in the recreation of historical recipes, such as hojuelas, a fried pastry that originated in sixteenth-century Spain which Jews in Argentina make for Purim; mufleta, a pastry made by Moroccan Jews for the holiday of Mimouna, which marks the end of Passover; and almodrote, a northern Spanish recipe for eggplant dip which closely resembles recipes for mashed eggplant included in two thirteenth-century Arabic cookbooks from Andalusia. In 2021, she presented a twelve-episode online cooking show on Sephardic culinary history for the American Sephardi Federation.

== Education and career ==
Helene Jawhara Piñer earned her PhD in Medieval History and the History of Food from the University of Tours in France, in 2019.

Piñer teaches at the University of Bordeaux-Montaigne and the University of Tours. She has lectured at institutions such as the Jewish Theological Seminary (New York), Carnegie Mellon University, the University of Pennsylvania, the Hebrew University of Jerusalem, Bar-Ilan University, and Yale University. She is a member of French research groups including the Institute of European History and Cultures of Food (IEHCA), Centre for Advanced Studies of the Renaissance (CESR), and Cooking Recipes of the Middle Ages Project (CoReMa).

Piñer has collaborated with chefs and cookbook authors including Michael Solomonov of the Philadelphia Israeli restaurant Zahav, with whom she has re-created historic Sephardic foods and menus.

In 2021, Piñer published her first cookbook, Sephardi: Cooking the History. Recipes of the Jews of Spain and the Diaspora, from the 13th Century to Today, in 2021. The book features recipes that highlight the culinary history and culture of the Sephardic Jewish diaspora. Many recipes come from an Andalusian Arabic cookbook of unknown authorship, called Kitab al-Tabikh ("The Book of Cooking"). Others come from contemporary Arabic and Catalan sources; still other recipes are her contemporary adaptations of historic recipes, using ingredients common in countries where Sephardic Jews settled, such as Brazil (with regard to manioc and tapioca flour) and Morocco. She suggests in the introduction that "to eat is to remember," and explains how recreating Sephardic meals commemorates Sephardic history. The recipes in Sephardi come from Spain, North Africa (especially Morocco), the lands of the former Ottoman Empire (especially Greece, Turkey, and the southern Balkans), and the Americas (especially Brazil and Mexico). Among the recipes is one for peot, a braided, leavened dough, scented with saffron and featured in a thirteenth-century Arabic recipe from Spain, which she suggests may have been a precursor to the challah bread now associated with Ashkenazi Jews – except that peot was fried rather than baked. This book won the 2021 Gourmand World Cookbook Awards Prize for Best Jewish Cuisine Book.

Piñer published a monograph, Jews, Food, and Spain, in 2022. In the book, she discusses the role of food in the culture of Jews and conversos in the Iberian Peninsula. Using cookbooks and Inquisition tribunal records as her primary sources, she analyzes recipes and food customs against the literary, medical, judicial, and religious history of Sephardic Jews in Spain during the pre-1492 era of Islamic rule, and later, in the sixteenth century, after the Reconquista. Piñer argues that food offers insights into what she calls "culinary ideology," and contends that Christian leaders in post-Reconquista Spain used claims about food practices to assert Christian supremacy and to suppress and persecute conversos, or Christian converts suspected of practicing Judaism in secret. She considers what made certain dishes "Jewish" in the eyes of Sephardic Jews themselves (for example, through adherence to kashrut, or kosher practices), and later, in the eyes of informants who reported people as "secret Jews" to Inquisitors. She concludes that these legacies of post-Reconquista culinary ideologies persist in the culinary culture of present-day Spain.

In 2024, Piñer published her second cookbook, entitled Matza and Flour: Recipes from the History of the Sephardic Jews, which draws on historical records such as Inquisition tribunal records. This book reconstructs historic recipes from Spain, Portugal, Mexico, Brazil, Morocco, Italy, and Greece, which use flours made from wheat, maize, chickpeas, barley, and rice and which include dishes such as matzah, tortillas, and empanadas. The recipes follow particular holidays such as Rosh Hashanah, Sukkot, and Passover.

== Bibliography ==
- Piñer, Hélène Jawhara (2021). Sephardi: Cooking the History. Recipes of the Jews of Spain and the Diaspora, from the 13th Century to Today. Academic Studies Press. ISBN 9781644695333.
- Piñer, Hélène Jawhara (2022). Jews, Food, and Spain: The Oldest Medieval Spanish Cookbook and the Sephardic Culinary Heritage. Academic Studies Press. ISBN 9781644699201.
