= Francisco Delicado =

Spanish writer and editor (c. 1480 – c. 1535)

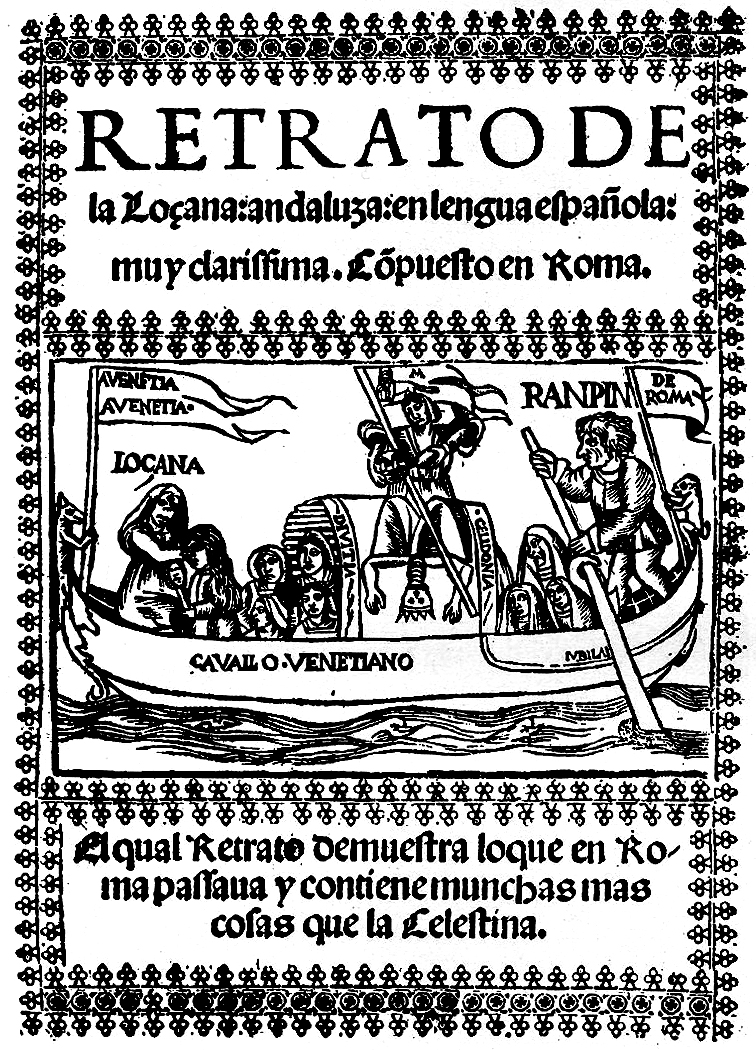
La Loçana andaluza, Venice, 1528.

Francisco Delicado (or Delgado) (c. 1480 – c. 1535) was a Spanish writer and editor of the Renaissance. Little is known about his life. He was born in Cordoba, Spain and, for uncertain reasons, he moved to Rome, where he Italianized his surname to Delicado. After the sack of Rome, he went to Venice where he wrote his novel Portrait of Lozana: The Lusty Andalusian Woman (El retrato de la Loçana Andaluza, 1528), that continues on the lines of the novel in dialogue exemplified by Celestina. The book is a social and historical portrait of Rome and its dark side in the first years of the 16th century, and one of the first works of the picaresque novel. He was also a disciple of Antonio de Nebrija (who wrote Gramática de la lengua castellana, the first extensive work on Spanish language grammar) and editor of books such as Amadis de Gaula (1533), Celestina (1531–1534), Primaleon (1534) and some medical treatises like El modo de adoperare el legno de India (about the use of leño de Indias in the treatment of syphilis) and De consolatione infirmorum (a work that is only mentioned at the end of Portrait of Lozana but of which no copies are known).

He himself suffered of syphilis. His favourable portrait of Jews has led some to suspect that he was a Converso.
