= Mofletta =

Maghrebi Jewish pancake

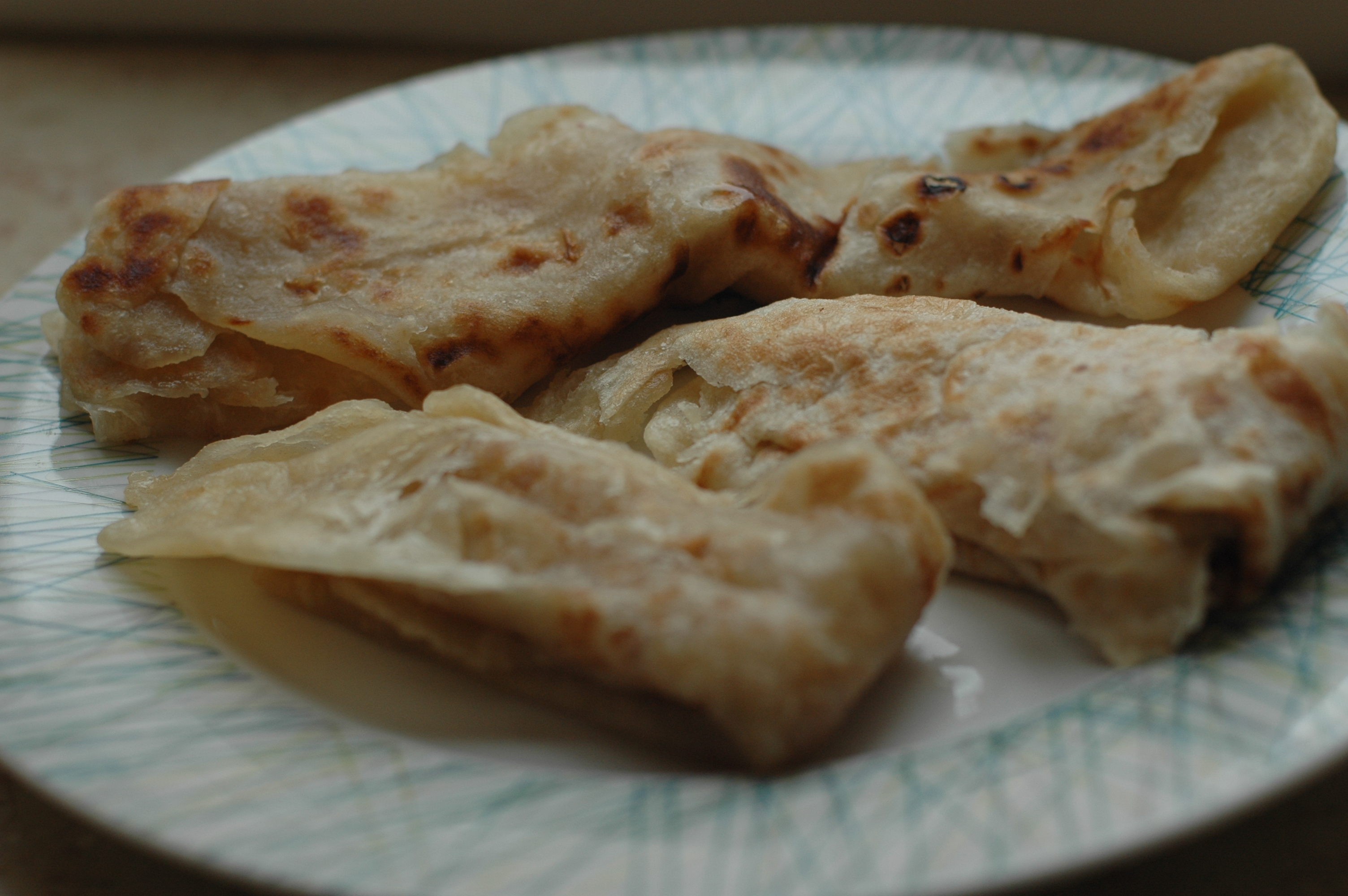
- Type: Crêpe
- Place of origin: Maghreb
- Serving temperature: Warm
- Main ingredients: Water, flour, oil

Mofletta (Hebrew: מופלטה, also Mufleta, Mofleta, Moufleta etc.) is a Maghrebi Jewish pancake traditionally eaten during the Mimouna celebration, the day after Passover.

Mofletta is a thin crêpe made from water, flour, and oil. The dough is rolled out thinly and cooked in a greased frying pan until it is yellow-brown. It is usually eaten warm and is spread with butter, honey, syrup, jam, walnuts, pistachios, or dried fruits.

The Mimouna holiday, brought to Israel by the Jewish communities of Maghreb, notably Jews in Morocco, is celebrated immediately after Passover. In the evening, a feast of fruit, confectionery, and pastries is set out for neighbors and visitors, and mofletta is one of the dishes traditionally served.

== History ==
According to Hélène Jawhara Piñer, the earliest known version of mofletta appears in the Kitāb al-ṭabīẖ, a cookbook composed in Medieval Spain during the 12th or 13th centuries CE. This cookbook includes a sweet dish called murakkaba, which involves cooking pancakes on one side only, stacking them into a small tower, and then drizzling the stack with melted butter and honey. This preparation method is unique within the cookbook and is not reflected in any other recipe.

== See also ==
- Cuisine of the Mizrahi Jews
- Israeli cuisine
