= Portrait of Lozana: The Lusty Andalusian Woman =

Book by Francisco Delicado

Portrait of Andalucian Lozana
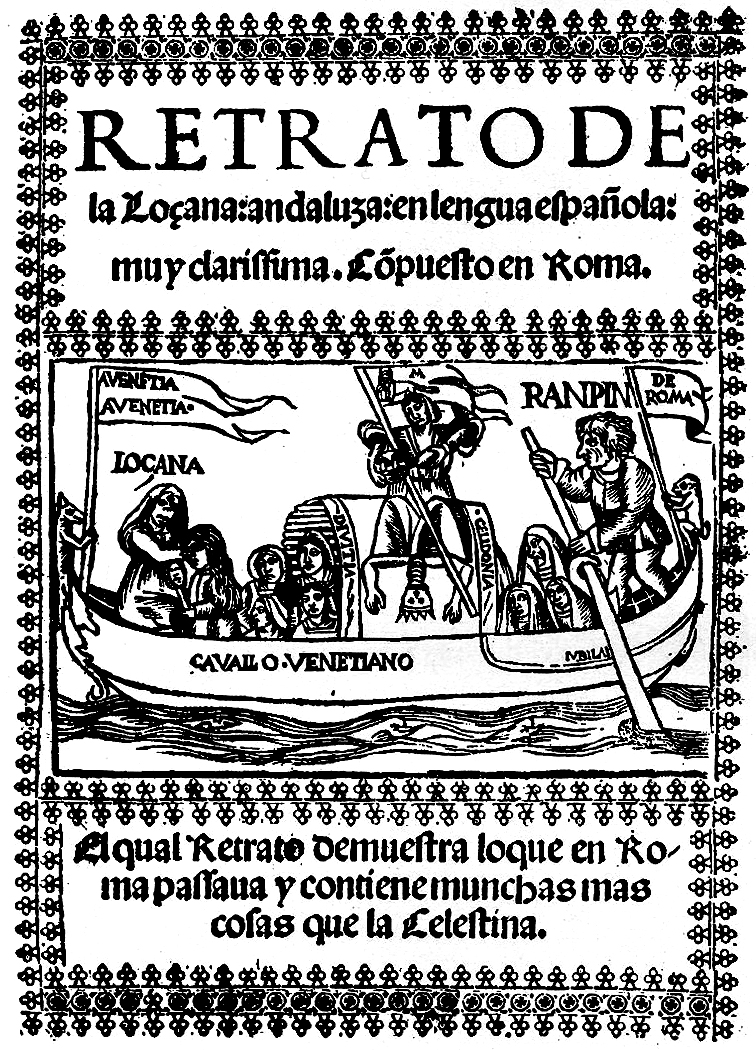
- Retrato de la Loçana andaluza..., Venice, 1528.
- Author: Francisco Delicado
- Original title: Retrato de la Loçana andaluza
- Translator: Bruno M. Damiani
- Language: Spanish
- Genre: Novel
- Publisher: Scripta Humanistica
- Publication date: 1528 (English trans. August 1987)
- Publication place: Spain
- Media type: Print (Hardback)
- Pages: 301 pp (Eng. Trans. hardback edition)
- ISBN: 0-916379-41-8 (Eng. Trans. hardback edition)
- OCLC: 15695720
- Dewey Decimal: 863/.3 19
- LC Class: PQ6388.D2 E5 1987

The Portrait of Andalucian Lozana (original title in Spanish: Retrato de la Loçana andaluza, translated into English by Bruno Damiani in 1987 as Portrait of Lozana: The Lusty Andalusian Woman) was published in Venice by the Spanish Renaissance writer, Francisco Delicado, in 1528, after he escaped from Rome due to the anti-Spanish sentiment that arose after the sack of Rome a year earlier. Published anonymously, the book contains a description of the life in Rome's underworld during the first third of the 16th century, focusing particularly on the world of immigrant women from Spain and Spanish Southern Italy. It includes one of the first accounts of women making beauty products, and working as beauty technicians. It is considered a descendant of Celestina (written some thirty years before by Fernando de Rojas) because of the literary genre, the novel in dialogue, and one of the earliest manifestations of the picaresque novel. There is only one extant copy of the book, now in the National Library of Austria, Vienna.

== Plot summary ==
The book begins in Cordoba where the sexually precocious Aldonza lives with her mother. After her mother's death, she moves to her aunt's house from where she escapes with Diomedes, a sea merchant. After travelling to many cities of the Mediterranean Sea and the Middle East and changing her name to Lozana, they come to Marseille to meet the father of Diomedes, who, disgusted with his son, sends him to prison and pays a sailor to make Lozana disappear. However, the sailor disobeys the order given and takes Lozana to Livorno, where she continues her journey up to Rome. Without money, Lozana goes to the Spanish sector in Rome to request help; there, the women see her abilities in cooking, and creating beauty products (although her face is a little bit disfigured by syphilis). After a Neapolitan woman gives her a servant called Rampin, Lozana makes an agreement with him so that he becomes, for a time, her servant and lover. Following the advice of a post man, and with the aid of a Jew called Trigos who installs her in a house he owns, she begins her new life as a prostitute. After a few years, she becomes the madame of a brothel, then Lozana and Rampin move to Lipari; the book ends with a little narration about the sack of Rome.

== Literary significance and criticism ==
One of the most important characteristics of the book is the didactic-satiric tone (like other examples of the picaresque novel, as Lazarillo de Tormes conceived as a strong critique done by the humanists), because it unveils the moral decadence of Rome, and all the characters displayed — from the bishops to the villains — appear surrounded by a world of corruption, prostitution and violence. This makes the book an eloquent, realistic testimony of the manners and life in the Roman underworld from the years 1513 to 1524 and the ulterior attack by the imperial forces of Charles V in 1527 that led to the finalisation of the first period of the Renaissance. While the narration never gets to 1527, there are some clues that prophesy this end, which can be compared to the punishment of Babel for the Romans' sins: Pues «año de veinte e siete, deja a Roma y vete», says the author (Arrived the year of twenty-seven, leave Rome and go away), as a clear manifestation of the divine punishment for the bad actions (along with the dogma of remuneration in the Christian faith).

The literary aspects in this book are the social description of characters as Lozana and Rampin, the defense of the Jews (in a historic moment when an intolerant attitude against them, as well as Muslims, had begun in Spain; also supported by the theory that Francisco Delicado was a converso). With the occasional intervention of the author as a character (as in the earlier Cárcel de Amor (Prison of Love) by Diego de San Pedro), its narrative structure (divided in 3 parts and 66 mamotretos) goes on the line begun by Celestina and the narration constructed on the basis of dialogues:

Lozana. Más gana tengo de dormir que de otra cosa

Tía. Sobrino, cená con nosotros, en tanto que vo e la ayudo a desnudar

Rampín. Señora, sí.

(Lozana. I would prefer to sleep rather than anything else

Aunt. Nephew, have dinner with us, while I go and help her to undress

Rampin. Yes, my lady).

The scatological and sexual elements prevail during the narration: there are descriptions of a ménage à trois; an episode in which Rampin gets covered from head to foot in excrement after falling in a latrine; and other uninhibited allusions to the reconstruction of hymen, and procreation. It gives one of the testimonies about syphilis as a plague in the first years of the 16th century: Linguistically, it uses different variants of Spanish as Germanía, Catalan and Italian. The book was considered obscene by Marcelino Menéndez y Pelayo who, according to the Mexican philologist, Antonio Alatorre, enjoyed the fact that Lozana hadn't had descendents in Spanish literature; a commentary that doesn't apply for the Italian literature in which Lozana's influence became evident in contemporary works as the Ragionamenti written almost a decade after by the Italian humanist Pietro Aretino.

== Film, TV or theatrical adaptations ==
There was a Spanish-Italian film version from 1975.

== Bibliography ==
- Alatorre, Antonio. 2002. Los 1001 años de la lengua española (México: FCE) (in Spanish).
- Delicado, Francisco. 1987. Portrait of Lozana: The Lusty Andalusian Woman: ISBN 0-916379-41-8
- Delicado, Francisco. 1969. La Lozana Andaluza. Bruno Damiani, ed. (Madrid: Castalia) (in Spanish).
- Delicado, Francisco. 1985. La Lozana Andaluza. Claude Allaigre, ed. (Madrid: Cátedra) (in Spanish).
