= Mimouna =

Traditional Maghrebi Jewish celebration dinner

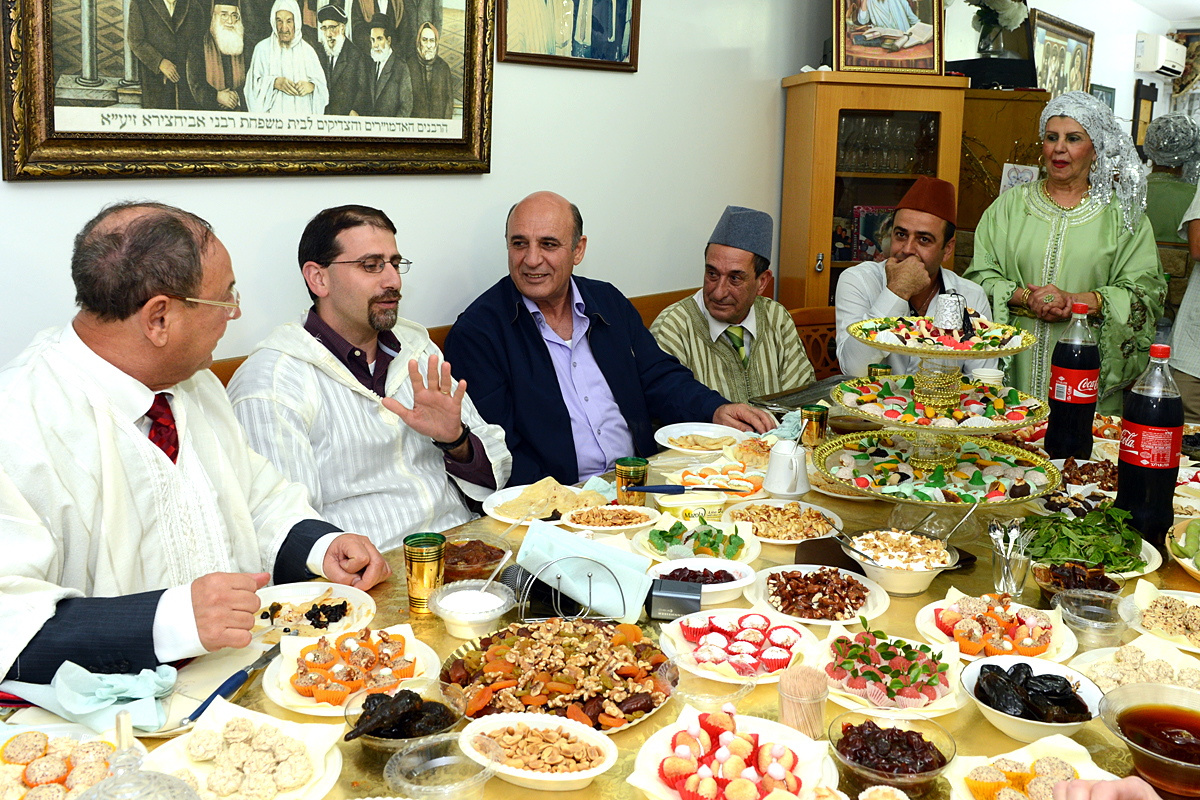
- Mimouna celebration, 2013
- Official name: מימונה
- Observed by: Maghrebi Jews
- Significance: Celebration of the end of chametz prohibition and of Passover
- Begins: 21st day of Nisan in Israel; 22nd day of Nisan outside of Israel
- Ends: 22nd day of Nisan in Israel; 23rd day of Nisan outside of Israel
- Date: 21 Nisan, 22 Nisan, 23 Nisan
- 2025 date: Sunset, 20 April – nightfall, 21 April
- 2026 date: Sunset, 9 April – nightfall, 10 April
- 2027 date: Sunset, 29 April – nightfall, 30 April
- 2028 date: Sunset, 18 April – nightfall, 19 April
- Related to: Passover

Mimouna (Hebrew: מִימוּנָה, Arabic: ميمونة, Berber: Mimuna, ⵎⵉⵎⵓⵏⴰ) is a traditional Maghrebi Jewish celebration dinner that takes place in Morocco, Israel, France, Canada, and other places around the world where Maghrebi Jews live. It is held the day after Passover, marking the return to eating hametz (leavened bread), which is forbidden throughout the week of Passover.

== History ==
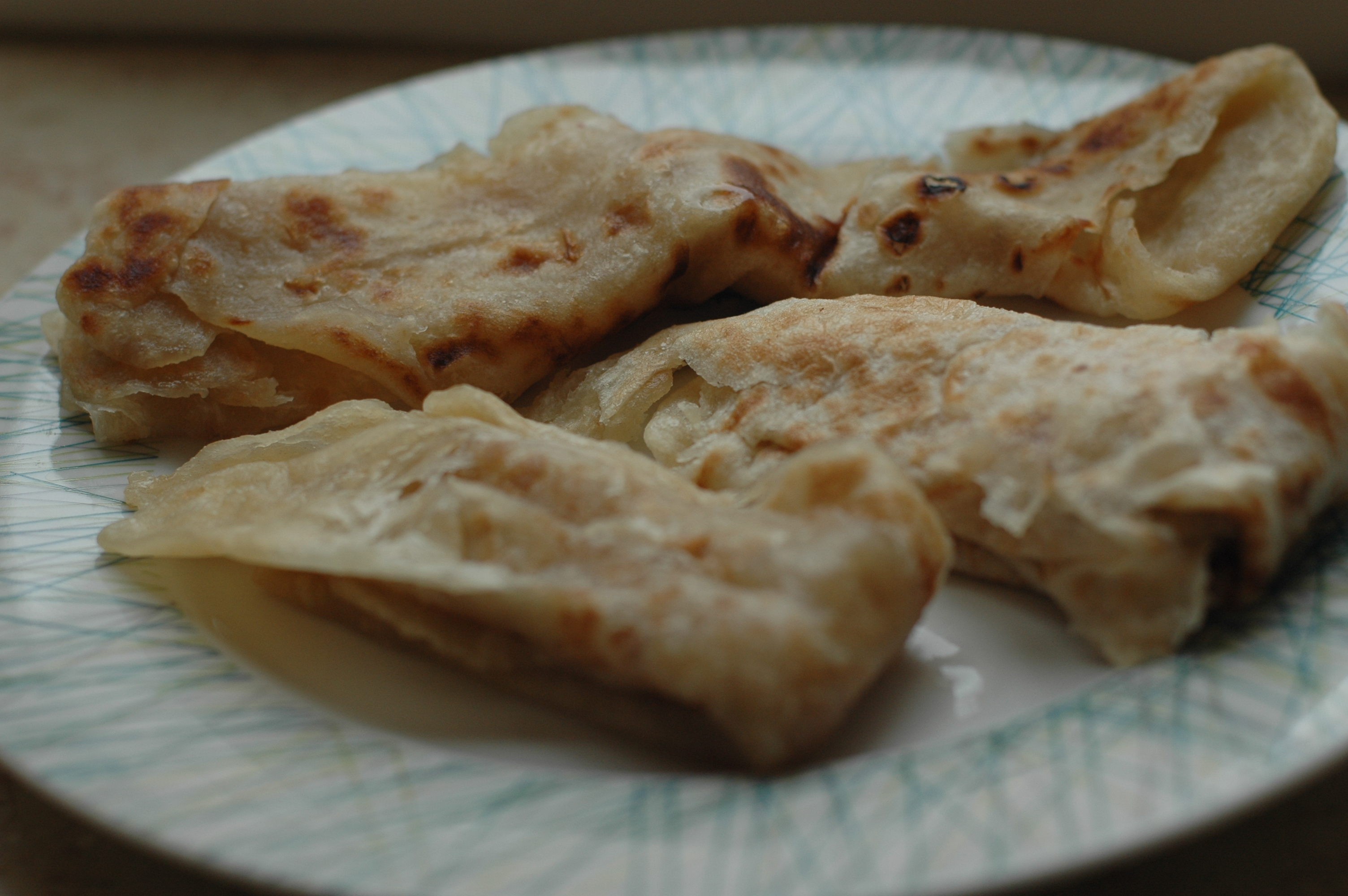
Mofletta

Though the practice only began to be recorded in the middle of the 18th century, its derivation and etymology are ancient. Possible derivations for the name Mimouna include:

- The name of Maimonides' father Maymun. Mimouna might mark the date of his birth or death
- Hebrew: אמונה, romanized: ʾəmunā "faith" or Hebrew: מאמין, romanized: Maʾămîn "I believe"
- The Arabic word for "wealth" or "good luck" as on this day, according to the midrash, the gold and jewelry of the drowned Egyptians washed up on the shore of the Red Sea and enriched the Israelites. Mimouna is associated with faith and belief in immediate prosperity, as seen in its customs of matchmaking, and well-wishes for successful childbearing.
- Manna, which was the food God provided following the Exodus, and during the subsequent wandering in the desert.
- The name of a Berber goddess is also a possible etymology.

Mimouna celebrates belief in both the Exodus and the future Messianic redemption: "In Nisan (the month in which Passover falls), the Jews were redeemed and in Nisan they will be redeemed in the future. When Passover ends and the Jews are still not redeemed, the Moroccan Jews do not lose their faith; as the Sages said: 'Even if he tarries, I will expect him every day.'"

It was at the crossing of the Yam Suph on the final day of Passover that the entire nation witnessed the awesome power and might of God which was an experience that strengthened their faith. "And Israel saw the great work which the LORD did upon the Egyptians, and the people feared the LORD; and they believed in the LORD, and in His servant Moses." – Exodus 14:31

== Holiday customs ==
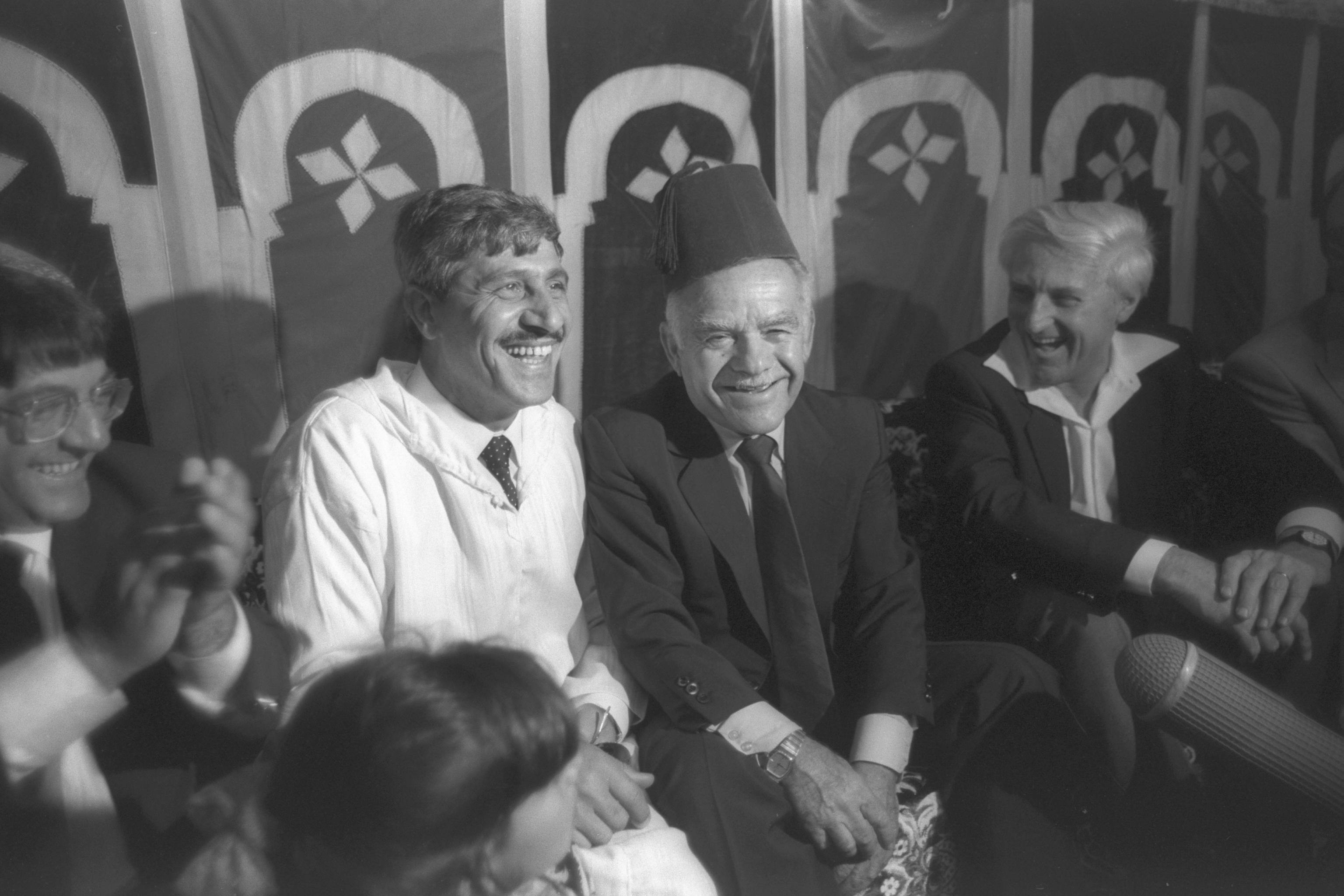
Israeli Prime Minister Yitzhak Shamir and Tel Aviv Mayor Shlomo Lahat at a Mimouna celebration in 1987

The celebration begins after nightfall on the last day of Passover. In many communities, non-Jewish neighbors sell chametz back to Jewish families as a beginning of the celebration. Moroccan and Algerian Jews throw open their homes to visitors, after setting out a lavish spread of traditional holiday cakes and sweetmeats. One of the holiday favorites is mofletta. The table is also laid with various symbols of luck and fertility, with an emphasis on the number five, such as five pieces of gold jewelry or five beans arranged on a leaf of pastry. The repetition of the number five references the five-fingered amulet called the hamsa common in North African and Middle Eastern communities of all faiths since premodern times.

Typically all those in attendance at a Mimouna celebration are sprinkled with a mint sprig or other green dipped in milk, symbolizing good fortune and new beginnings. Early in the day of the Mimouna, families go to the sea, splash water on their face, and walk barefoot in the water, to replay the scene of the miraculous crossing of the Yam Suph, which is held to have taken place on the last day of Passover. In Morocco, Jewish families prepared flour, honey, milk, and butter to be used to prepare post-Passover hametz celebration dinners. Jews would walk to an orchard to recite Birkat Ha'Ilanot and recite passages from the Book of Proverbs and the Mishna.

Celebration of Mimouna in Israel began in 1966. The first mass picnic was organized in Ben Shemen by a community activist, Shaul Ben Shimhon, who saw it as a way of unifying the North African Jewish community. This event was attended by 300 people, but the following year it attracted 3,000. By 1970, the main event in Jerusalem drew tens of thousands. Now Mimouna is an annual happening featuring outdoor parties, picnics and BBQs. The central event is held in Jerusalem’s Sacher Park, drawing large crowds and Israeli politicians. Israeli law requires employers to grant an employee unpaid leave for Mimouna if requested. One source estimated that in 2012 nearly two million people in Israel participated in Mimouna festivities.

== See also ==
- Culture of Morocco
- Culture of Israel
- Moroccan Jews in Israel
- Jewish holidays
