= The Great Canadian Baking Show season 10 =

10th season of Canadian Baking Show

The Great Canadian Baking Show
- Season 10
- Starring: Ann Pornel; Alan Shane Lewis; Bruno Feldeisen; Kyla Kennaley
- No. of episodes: 7

Release
- Original network: CBC Television
- Original release: October 4, 2026

Season chronology
- ← Previous; Season 9 Next → The Great Canadian Holiday Baking Show (2026)

The tenth season of The Great Canadian Baking Show premiered on CBC Television on October 4, 2026. As with previous seasons, ten amateur bakers compete over eight weeks of challenges, vying for the title. Ann Pornel and Alan Shane Lewis return for their seventh season as hosts. Bruno Feldeisen and Kyla Kennaley return for their tenth and eighth seasons respectively as judges.

== Bakers ==
Baker	Age	Profession	Hometown
Ahmad Farhat	32	Senior Policy and Program Analyst	Montreal, QC
Andrew Arcello	38	Music and drama teacher	Stittsville, ON
Angie Kealey	52	Cardiologist	Calgary, AB
Jen Hudson	51	Podcast producer	Mundleville, NB
Justine Reyes	37	Lab supervisor	Saskatoon, SK
Kami Elmekki	27	Policy analyst	Montreal, QC
Sam Kim	33	Social media marketer	Toronto, ON
Saul Caverhill	39	Electrical engineer	Calgary, AB
Slavomira Blahová	38	Office manager	Edmonton, AB
Vandana Singh	41	Customer Success Manager	Fredericton, NB

== Results summary ==
Colour key:

Baker was one of the judges' least favourite bakers that week, but was not eliminated.
Baker was one of the judges' favourite bakers that week, but was not the Star Baker.
Baker got through to the next round.
Baker was eliminated.
Baker was the Star Baker.
Baker was a season runner-up.
Baker was the season winner.

Elimination chart
Baker	1	2	3	4	5	6	7	8
Andrew								
Justine				SB		SB		
Saul		SB					SB	
Angie	SB						OUT	
Slavomira					SB	OUT		
Kami					OUT			
Vandana				OUT				
Jen			OUT					
Ahmad		OUT						
Sam	OUT							

== Episodes ==
Baker eliminated
Star Baker
Winner

=== Episode 1: Cake Week ===
To celebrate the tenth season, the signature challenge is an homage to the technical challenge from the show's first season: the bakers had to make their version of a Battenberg cake in 2 hours. In the technical challenge, the bakers had 2 hours to bake a Nanaimo bar cheesecake. The dessert reimagines a Nanaimo bar as a cake with a brownie base, vanilla custard cream cheese filling, chocolate ganache topping, and decorated with tempered chocolate. For the showstopper, the bakers were given 4 hours to make a cake inspired by the number 10.

Baker	Signature (Battenberg cake)	Technical (Nanaimo bar cheesecake)	Showstopper (Celebrating 10 cake)
Ahmad	Inside Out & Round About Battenberg	5th	Uncle Ahmad's Pan-Cake
Andrew	Teatime Battenberg	7th	10 Keys of Flavour
Angie	Chai-normous Battenberg	6th	Towering 10th Anniversary
Jen	Margarita Battenberg	8th	Sweet October
Justine	Battenberg on Ice	3rd	Superpowered Showstopper
Kami	Whimsy & Matcha Battenberg	4th	Top 10 Playlist Cake
Sam	Buzzworthy Battenberg	10th	Crab Cake
Saul	Winter Wonderland Battenberg	9th	Taste of 10 Years Cake
Slavomira	Royal Merger Battenberg	1st	10 Commandments of Baking
Vandana	Taste of India Battenberg	2nd	Oh Canada Cake

=== Episode 2: Milk and Cookies Week ===
For the first ever Milk and Cookies Week, the bakers had 2 hours to bake 12 decorated cookies for dunking in dip of their choice for the signature challenge. The technical challenge had the bakers make 9 maamoul mad bil ashta dessert bars in 2 hours. The Lebanese dessert is composed semolina maamoul mad biscuits sandwiching a thick layer of ashta cream enriched with areesha cheese made by the bakers and orange blossom water, and topped with pistachios and kumquats. For the showstopper, the bakers were given 4 hours to create a Milky Way cookie display inspired by outer space, that must be composed of two types of cookies and incorporate milk in some way.

Baker	Signature (12 Dunkers with dip)	Technical (9 Maamoul Mad Bil Ashta)	Showstopper (Milky Way Cookie Display)
Ahmad	We All Scream for Ice Cream Dunkers	5th	Look to the Gods Cookie Display
Andrew	Ode to Gram Dunkers	6th	Black Hole Cookie Display
Angie	Boozy Apple Dunkers	4th	Welcome to Earth Cookie Display
Jen	Everything's Peachy Keen Dunkers	8th	Milky Way Rapids Cookie Display
Justine	Marshmallow Swirl Dunkers	7th	Ube-yond the Milky Way Cookie Display
Kami	Breakfast in Sudan Dunkers	1st	Intergalactic Love Story Cookie Display
Saul	Sweet Pick-Me-Up Dunkers	3rd	Close Encounters of the Cookie Kind Display
Slavomira	Stuffed Speculaas Dunkers	2nd	Rocket Ship for Dávid Cookie Display
Vandana	Gajar Halwa Biscotti Dunkers	9th	The Sun Meets the Moon Cookie Display

=== Episode 3: Tropical Week ===
In the signature challenge, the bakers had 2 hours to make flan featuring tropical flavours. In the technical challenge, the bakers had to bake 6 pastelitos de guayaba y queso, popular Cuban puff pastries filled with guava paste and whipped cream cheese, in 2 hours and 15 minutes. For the showstopper, the bakers were given 4 hours to make a tropical themed pavlova stack with at least two tiers.

Baker	Signature (Flan)	Technical (6 Pastelitos)	Showstopper (Pavlova stack)
Andrew	Pineapple Upside-Down Flan	2nd	Queen's Park Swizzle Pavlova
Angie	Spiked Orange Flan	7th	Pretty in Pink Pavlova Stack
Jen	Sunny Orange Cardamom Flan	6th	Citrus Stack
Justine	Filipino Leche Flan	4th	Pretty Pavlova Planter
Kami	Ube Leche Flan	8th	Tropical Sea Stack
Saul	Cheesy Guanábana Flan	1st	Tropical Tang Pavlova Stack
Slavomira	Midnight Monarch Flan	3rd	Green Queen
Vandana	Heart of Pandan Flan	5th	Tropical Burst Pavlova Stack

=== Episode 4: Picnic Week ===
In the first ever Picnic Week, the bakers had to bake a loaf of South African picnic bread, an eggy quick bread with savoury ingredients, and an complementary condiment, in 1 hour and 45 minutes for the signature challenge. For the technical challenge set by Kyla, the bakers had to make illusion ants on a log, with a sugar cookie base resembling celery, peanut butter mousse, and chocolate truffle ants, in 2 hours and 15 minutes. For the showstopper, the bakers were given 4 hours to make a pain surprise. A French favourite consisting of a large loaf of bread hollowed out and filled with small sandwiches and covered with bread lid, the bakers' version needed to include two different types of bread, one for the vessel and one for the sandwiches with fixings of their choice.

Baker	Signature (South African picnic bread)	Technical (4 Illusion ants on a log)	Showstopper (Pain surprise)
Andrew	Soup-er Lentil Loaf	7th	Greek Holiday Pain Surprise
Angie	Got No Beef Wellington Loaf	5th	Tortue Pain Surprise
Justine	Tocilog Picnic Loaf	3rd	Crispy Katsu-rprise
Kami	That's Elote! Picnic Loaf	1st	Focaccia FLT Surprise
Saul	Beer 'n' Cheese 'n' Onion Loaf	4th	Challah'va Surprise
Slavomira	Back to Italy Loaf	2nd	Slovakian Surprise
Vandana	Kali Mirch Picnic Loaf	6th	Picnic Basket Surprise

=== Episode 5: Birthday Week ===
For the signature challenge, the bakers had to bake a lapis legit, an Indonesian celebration cake, featuring at least ten layers, in 2 hours and 15 minutes. For the technical challenge set by Bruno, the bakers were given 2.5 hours to make 6 birthday bao. Known also as longevity peach buns, the Chinese steamed buns are shaped to resemble peaches and filled with lotus seed paste. For the showstopper, the bakers needed to create a birthday-inspired donut display, composed of at least 18 donuts of two different kinds, in 4 hours.

Baker	Signature (Lapis legit)	Technical (6 Birthday bao)	Showstopper (Birthday donut display)
Andrew	Strawberry Shortcake Lapis Legit	3rd	Backyard Birthday Donut Display
Angie	Big Gold Pineapple Lapis Legit	4th	Sweet Gown Donut Display
Justine	Bubble Tea Lapis Legit	2nd	Boozy Birthday Donut Display
Kami	All Grown Up Birthday Lapis Legit	6th	Say Cheese & Popcorn Donut Display
Saul	Birthday Banan-za!	5th	Summer Half-Birthday Donut Display
Slavomira	Honey Cake Meets Lapis Legit	1st	Childhood Memories Donut Display

=== Episode 6: Vintage Week ===
For first-ever Vintage Week signature challenge, the bakers had to bake 8 gougères, savoury French pastries made of choux dough mixed with grated cheese, in 2 hours and 15 minutes. In the technical challenge set by Kyla, the bakers had to make a flapper pie in 2 hours. Made popular in the Canadian Prairies in the 1920s, the flapper pie consists of a vanilla-rye whiskey custard filling with lemon zest, graham cracker shortcrust, and is topped with a torched meringue dome decorated with graham cracker feathers. For the showstopper, the bakers needed to create a Charlotte Royale centrepiece in 4 hours and 15 minutes. In addition to a Charlotte Royale cake made of Bavarian cream dome and decorated with jelly roll slices, the bakers must also include an additional cake layer for the centrepiece.

Baker	Signature (8 Gougères)	Technical (Flapper pie)	Showstopper (Charlotte Royale centrepiece)
Andrew	Fancy Fiesta Gougères	4th	Royally 90's Charlotte Centrepiece
Angie	Curry Spice & Everything Nice Gougères	1st	Thanksgiving Charlotte Centrepiece
Justine	Khao Soi Soup-gères	2nd	Charlotte Royale à la Mode
Saul	Peas de Resistance Gougères	3rd	Monday Memories Charlotte Centrepiece
Slavomira	Bryndzové Halušky Gougères	5th	Very Berry Charlotte Royale

=== Episode 7: Arts and Crafts Week ===
For the signature challenge, the bakers had to bake a decorated bread wreath in 2 hours and 15 minutes. In the technical challenge set by Bruno, the bakers had to craft a Japanese teapot cake, composed of layers of green tea flavoured cake and white chocolate white peach buttercream and molded with fondant and decorated with florals to resemble a Japanese teapot, in 2.5 hours. For the showstopper, the bakers needed to create a 3D stained glass cookie sculpture, using sugar work to create a stained glass effect, in 4 hours and 15 minutes.

Baker	Signature (Decorated bread wreath)	Technical (Japanese teapot cake)	Showstopper (3D Stained glass cookie sculpture)
Andrew	Christmas Carol Babka Wreath	4th	Succulent Cookie Terrarium
Angie	Rollin' with Stollen Bread Wreath	1st	Trip to the Fair Cookie Carousel
Justine	Dim Sum Dragon Bread Wreath	3rd	Wok Still Life Cookie Sculpture
Saul	Ooey Gooey Bread Wreath	2nd	Light of My Life Cookie Lanterns
