= The Great Canadian Baking Show season 9 =

9th season of Canadian Baking Show

The Great Canadian Baking Show
- Season 9
- Starring: Ann Pornel; Alan Shane Lewis; Bruno Feldeisen; Kyla Kennaley
- No. of episodes: 8

Release
- Original network: CBC Television
- Original release: October 5 – November 23, 2025

Season chronology
- ← Previous; Season 8 Next → Season 10

The ninth season of The Great Canadian Baking Show premiered on CBC Television on October 5, 2025. As with previous seasons, ten amateur bakers compete over eight weeks of challenges, vying for the title. Ann Pornel and Alan Shane Lewis return for their sixth season as hosts. Bruno Feldeisen and Kyla Kennaley return for their ninth and seventh seasons respectively as judges.

== Bakers ==
Baker	Age	Profession	Hometown
Dan Vano	35	Customer Success Associate	Burnaby, BC
Dominic Ménard-Bilodeau	49	CÉGEP Geography Teacher	Longueuil, QC
Jennifer Tsang	24	Masters Student	Burnaby, BC
Jo Mandet	44	Event Planner	Vancouver, BC
Kavi Chatoorgoon	48	Pediatric General Surgeon	Saskatoon, SK
Margaret Bose-Johnson	66	Part-Time Kindergarten Teacher	Parkland County, AB
Ryan Gridzak	34	Steel Mill Crane Operator	Sault Ste. Marie, ON
Shaneka Ekanayake	38	Sales Support Administrator	Barrie, ON
Tamara Church	56	Family Court Counsellor	St. John's, NL
Zoë Weinrebe	31	Marketing Manager	Toronto, ON

== Results summary ==
Colour key:

Baker was one of the judges' least favourite bakers that week, but was not eliminated.
Baker was one of the judges' favourite bakers that week, but was not the Star Baker.
Baker got through to the next round.
Baker was eliminated.
Baker was the Star Baker.
Baker was a season runner-up.
Baker was the season winner.

Elimination chart
Baker	1	2	3	4	5	6	7	8
Jo		SB				SB		WINNER
Ryan								Runner Up
Zoë							SB	Runner Up
Jennifer	SB						OUT	
Margaret					SB	OUT		
Dominic			SB		OUT			
Kavi				OUT				
Tamara			OUT					
Shaneka		OUT						
Dan	OUT							

== Episodes ==
Baker eliminated
Star Baker
Winner

=== Episode 1: Cake Week ===
For their first signature challenge, the bakers were given 2 hours to make a Korean lunchbox cake: mini layered cakes with adorable decorations that are included as single servings in takeout containers. In the technical challenge set by Bruno, the bakers had 2 hours to bake a bolo de cenoura, a dessert inspired by the Brazilian carrot cake flavoured with orange juice and zest and puréed carrots, and decorated with chocolate curls and candied carrots. For the showstopper, the bakers had 4 hours to make a homegrown cake, a cake that embodies a place they call home.

Baker	Signature (Korean lunchbox cake)	Technical (Bolo de cenoura)	Showstopper (Homegrown cake)
Dan	Chocolate Hills Lunchbox Cake	9th	Northern Lights Cake
Dominic	Tea-riffic Lunchbox Cake	2nd	Home Away from Home Cake
Jennifer	Cherry Blossom Lunchbox Cake	1st	Joffre Lakes Cake
Jo	Evil Eye Lunchbox Cake	3rd	English Countryside Cake
Kavi	Tropical Carrot Lunchbox Cake	7th	Journey Home Cake
Margaret	German Welcome Lunchbox Cake	4th	Garden Bliss Cake
Ryan	Busy Bee Lunchbox Cake	6th	Winter in the Soo Cake
Shaneka	Into the Sunset Lunchbox Cake	10th	Ode to Sri Lanka
Tamara	Love in Full Bloom Lunchbox Cake	8th	Back to Bay Bulls Cake
Zoë	Guava Nice Day Lunchbox Cake	5th	Jamaican Beach Cake

=== Episode 2: Bread Week ===
For their signature challenge, the bakers were given 2 hours to make eight steamed buns: fluffy and pillowy buns that are stuffed or filled. In the technical challenge set by Kyla, the bakers had 2 hours to bake a dozen Norwegian school bread, cardamom-infused enriched dough desserts filled with custard and decorated with icing dipped in grated coconut. For the showstopper, the bakers had 4 hours to make a muffuletta, a giant sandwich to be shared.

Baker	Signature (8 Steamed buns)	Technical (Norwegian school bread)	Showstopper (Muffuletta)
Dominic	Moroccan Dream Buns	2nd	Banh-mi-Letta
Jennifer	Lucky Money Bag Bao	6th	Blooming Rose Muffuletta
Jo	Sunny Salmon Steamed Buns	1st	Mediterranean Feast Muffuletta
Kavi	Trini-Indian Steamed Buns	3rd	Veggie Rainbow Muffuletta
Margaret	Black Pearl Burgers	5th	Sea of Salmon Muffuletta
Ryan	Fluffy & Floral Steamed Buns	7th	Game Day Muffuletta
Shaneka	Sri Lankan Heat Steamed Buns	9th	Pork & Jackfruit Muffuletta
Tamara	Ocean Breeze Steamed Buns	4th	Jigg's Dinner Muffuletta
Zoë	Tangerine Twist Steamed Buns	8th	All Things German Muffuletta

=== Episode 3: Carnival Week ===
For the first ever Carnival Week, the bakers were given 2 hours to make eight servings of fried dough treats, personalized with exciting flavours and garnishes, for their signature challenge. In the technical challenge set by Bruno, the bakers were tasked with making a prinjolata, a Maltese Carnival dessert, in 2 hours and 15 minutes. The dessert is made of lemon sponge cake, chocolate cookies, pine nuts, and amaretto buttercream in a marbled pattern shaped to form a dome that is encased in a decorated torched Italian meringue. For the showstopper, the bakers had 4 hours to create a colourful cookie Carnival mask, taking inspiration from any carnival or festival.

Baker	Signature (8 Fried dough treats)	Technical (Prinjolata)	Showstopper (Cookie Carnival mask)
Dominic	Sweet Heat Peach Pies	5th	Demon of Bali
Jennifer	Korean Corn Dog Rings	2nd	Lion Dance Mask
Jo	With Love from England Apple Pies	6th	Party in Rio
Kavi	Ruby Kurma Balls	8th	Peacock for Madhuri Mask
Margaret	Mardi Gras Mash-Up	1st	Dapper Devil Mask
Ryan	Choco-Churro Carny Cones	4th	Spiced & Iced Jester Mask
Tamara	Have a Touton or Do Wit'out 'Ne	7th	Ode to Jellybean Row
Zoë	Lemony Stick-It Mochi	3rd	Lime n' Thyme Caribbean Festival Mask

=== Episode 4: Maple Week ===
For the first ever Maple Week, the bakers had to make eight pudding chômeur, or "poor man's pudding", a dessert from Quebec with a cake-like batter in a maple sauce, for their signature challenge, in 2 hours. In the technical challenge set by Kyla, the bakers were given 2 hours and 15 minutes to bake a maple mousse tart, with a shortcrust pastry shell, and layers of maple syrup mousse, maple butter-walnut fudge, and raspberry jam. For the showstopper, the bakers had 4 hours to create a maple brunch platter, with sweet and savoury bakes featuring maple. The bakers needed to make six servings of three different bakes, which must include one with a laminated dough, one quick bread, and one being the baker's choice.

Baker	Signature (8 Pudding chômeur)	Technical (Maple mousse tart)	Showstopper (Maple brunch brunch)
Dominic	Miso Maple Kiss	1st	Sugar Shack Brunch
Jennifer	Maple Margarita Chômeur	3rd	Under the Apple Tree Brunch
Jo	Boozy Banana Chômeur	4th	Family Favourites Brunch
Kavi	Maple Chômeur Latte	7th	Mad Maple Mélange
Margaret	Maple Berry Bliss	2nd	Buncha Bruncha
Ryan	Maple Cherry Bomb Chômeur	6th	Sweet & Spicy Brunch
Zoë	Smokin' Sesame Chômeur	5th	Jamaican Maple Brunch

=== Episode 5: Indulgence Week ===
For the first ever Indulgence Week, the signature challenge required the bakers to make six decadent mini cheesecakes in 2 hours and 15 minutes. In the technical challenge set by Bruno, the bakers had to bake six Dubai chocolate cookies, made with three different types of chocolate and stuffed with a pistachio and tahini paste and fried kataifi dough filling, in 2 hours and 15 minutes. For the showstopper challenge, the bakers were given 4 hours and 15 minutes to create a layer cake wrapped within sponge cake with a detailed printed design.

Baker	Signature (6 mini cheesecakes)	Technical (6 Dubai chocolate cookies)	Showstopper (Cake-wrapped layer cake)
Dominic	Berry Good Cheesecake	5th	Dive into Fall Cake
Jennifer	Pretty in Pink Cheesecake	3rd	Chinese Porcelain Cake
Jo	"Why So Blue?" Cheesecake	1st	Boozy Black Forest Cake
Margaret	Strawberry Domes Forever	2nd	Smell the Roses Cake
Ryan	Ube-tter Believe It's Cheesecake	4th	Spooktacular Cake
Zoë	Cherry Chai Cheesecake	6th	Strawberry Patch Cake

=== Episode 6: Pastry Week ===
For their signature challenge, the bakers were given 2 hours and 15 minutes to make a birthday pie. In the technical challenge set by Kyla, the bakers had to bake a lenza, a hybrid dessert from Egypt made of a cake-like batter that is pressed into a tart pan and then filled with mahalabia, a milk pudding, and pomegranate jam, in 2 hours and 15 minutes. For the showstopper challenge, the bakers were given 4 hours to create a family-sized mille-feuille.

Baker	Signature (Birthday pie)	Technical (Lenza)	Showstopper (Mille-feuille)
Jennifer	Par-Tea Hat Pie	2nd	Fan-tastic Mille-Feuille
Jo	Caviar in the Country Pie	3rd	English Trifle Mille-Feuille
Margaret	Live, Laugh, Lemon Birthday Pie	5th	Trip to Sicily Mille-Feuille
Ryan	Pear-fect Birthday Pie for Grandma	1st	Hearty Mille-Feuille
Zoë	S'more Pie for Dad	4th	Picnic Party Mille-Feuille

=== Episode 7: Fairy Tale Week ===
For the first-ever Fairy Tale Week, the bakers were given 2.5 hours to reinvent fairy bread, a popular treat in Australia and New Zealand at children's parties, as eight buns with sprinkles made by the bakers, for their signature challenge. In the technical challenge set by Bruno, the bakers had to bake ten cookies as a reimagining of sugar plums, in 1 hour and 45 minutes. The cookies must resemble plums and are composed of soft cookies sandwiched around plum jam and whipped ricotta cheese. For the showstopper challenge, the bakers were given 4.5 hours to create an edible pop-up story book of their favourite fairy tale, with components made of cake and cookies.

Baker	Signature (8 Fairy bread buns)	Technical (10 Sugar plum cookies)	Showstopper (Pop-up story book)
Jennifer	Spill the Tea Fairy Buns	4th	Beauty & the Beast Rose Garden
Jo	Sweet Sunset Conchas	2nd	Snow White Pop-up Book
Ryan	Sticky Ooey-Gooey Fairy Buns	1st	Jack & the Beanstalk Pop-up Book
Zoë	B-A-N-A-N-A Land Fairy Buns	3rd	Princess & the Pea Pop-up Book

=== Episode 8: Finale ===
For the signature challenge, the bakers had 2 hours and 15 minutes to make a bossche bollen vlaai, a dessert that combines two popular Dutch pastries: the vlaai, a flat tart with a yeasted crust, and bossche bollen, profiteroles filled with whipped cream and covered in dark chocolate. The bakers may use any fillings and toppings for their version of the bossche bollen vlaai. In the technical challenge set by Kyla, the bakers had to bake a crema de fruta, a Filipino dessert made of a calamansi chiffon cake and vanilla custard, and decorated with whipped cream, graham cracker crumbs, and fruit cocktail set in pandan gelatin, in 2 hours and 15 minutes. For the showstopper challenge, the bakers were given 4.5 hours to create a madeleine tree, a stunning tower made of madeleines and paired with an additional bake of their choice.

Baker	Signature (Bossche bollen vlaai)	Technical (Crema de fruta)	Showstopper (Madeleine tree)
Jo	Poire Belle Bossche Bollen Vlaai	3rd	Sweetie Tree
Ryan	Charcuterie Picnic Bossche Bollen Vlaai	1st	Garden Party Tree
Zoë	Fiery Ginger-Carrot Bossche Bollen Vlaai	2nd	Tree of Fortune
