= The Great Canadian Baking Show season 8 =

Television cooking show

The Great Canadian Baking Show
- Season 8
- Starring: Ann Pornel; Alan Shane Lewis; Bruno Feldeisen; Kyla Kennaley
- No. of episodes: 8

Release
- Original network: CBC Television
- Original release: October 6 – November 24, 2024

Season chronology
- ← Previous; The Great Canadian Holiday Baking Show (2023) Next → Season 9

The eighth season of The Great Canadian Baking Show premiered on CBC Television on October 6, 2024. As with previous seasons, ten amateur bakers compete over eight weeks of challenges, vying for the title. Ann Pornel and Alan Shane Lewis return for their fifth season as hosts. Bruno Feldeisen and Kyla Kennaley return for their eighth and sixth seasons respectively as judges.

== Bakers ==
| Baker | Age | Profession | Hometown |
|---|---|---|---|
| Guillaume Boivin | 35 | Psychologist | Saguenay, QC |
| Christine Campbell | 46 | Customer service representative | Saint John, NB |
| Jen Childs | 45 | Bookkeeper | Esquimalt, BC |
| Patty De Guia | 50 | Stay-at-Home Cat Mom | Toronto, ON |
| Elora Khanom | 42 | E-commerce process assistant | Edmonton, AB |
| Pamela Kramer | 34 | Cooperative education teacher | Stayner, ON |
| Réjean Mayer | 58 | Retired communications manager | Ottawa, ON |
| Erica Schell | 30 | Ecologist | Calgary, AB |
| Marcus Tam | 30 | Tax manager | Vancouver, BC |
| Rita Vathje | 60 | Retired | Calgary, AB |

== Results summary ==
Colour key:

Baker was one of the judges' least favourite bakers that week, but was not eliminated.
Baker was one of the judges' favourite bakers that week, but was not the Star Baker.
Baker got through to the next round.
Baker was eliminated.
Baker was the Star Baker.
Baker was a season runner-up.
Baker was the season winner.

Elimination chart
| Baker | 1 | 2 | 3 | 4 | 5 | 6 | 7 | 8 |
|---|---|---|---|---|---|---|---|---|
| Elora | | | SB | | | | SB | WINNER |
| Jen | SB | | | | SB | | | Runner Up |
| Pamela | | | | SB | | | | Runner Up |
| Erica | | | | | | | OUT | |
| Rita | | | | | | OUT | | |
| Marcus | | | | | OUT | | | |
| Guillaume | | SB | | OUT | | | | |
| Patty | | | OUT | | | | | |
| Réjean | | OUT | | | | | | |
| Christine | OUT | | | | | | | |

== Episodes ==
Baker eliminated
Star Baker
Winner

=== Episode 1: Cake Week ===
For their first signature challenge, the bakers were given two hours to make a love cake, using nut flours and flavoured with spices and aromatics. In the technical challenge set by Bruno, the bakers had 2 hours to bake a schmoo cake, a cake from Winnipeg composed of layers of pecan angel food cake, whipped cream, candied pecans, and caramel sauce. For the showstopper, the bakers had four hours to make a split cake - a cake that is split open and decorated on the inside and outside.

| Baker | Signature (Love cake) | Technical (Schmoo cake) | Showstopper (Split cake) |
|---|---|---|---|
| Guillaume | Woodsy Cake | 3rd | Gynandromorphic Moth Cake |
| Christine | Lime in the Coconut Cake | 9th | Split Heritage Cake |
| Jen | Ode to the Tent | 1st | Half & Half Black Forest |
| Patty | Filipino Love Cake | 6th | Impressive Impressionist Cake |
| Elora | Ras Malai Love Cake | 5th | Geode Split Cake |
| Pamela | From Uruguay with Love Cake | 7th | Bananas for Split Cake |
| Réjean | Proposal Cake | 10th | Family Tree Cake |
| Erica | Perfect Morning Love Cake | 2nd | Pumpkin Patch at First Frost |
| Marcus | Pumpkin Redemption Cake | 8th | Tasty to the Core Cake |
| Rita | Love for Mama Cake | 4th | Don't Burst My Bubble Cake |

=== Episode 2: Cookie Week ===
For the signature challenge, the bakers had to bake 10 stuffed cookies, with any type of filling, in 2 hours. In the technical challenge, the bakers were given 1 hour and 45 minutes to make 12 raspberry wafer cookies, with white chocolate raspberry buttercream and drizzled with tempered white chocolate and dried raspberry powder. For the showstopper, the bakers had four hours to create a cookie map, with two different types of cookie with different flavour profiles.

| Baker | Signature (10 Stuffed cookies) | Technical (12 Raspberry wafer cookies) | Showstopper (Cookie map) |
|---|---|---|---|
| Guillaume | Straight from the Heart Stuffed Cookies | 1st | Fight or Flight Cookie Map |
| Jen | Charcute-cookie | 2nd | Journey to a Sweater Cookie Map |
| Patty | Sweet 'n Salty Stuffed Cookies | 7th | Cookie Map of Patty's Brain |
| Elora | Malaysian Tart Stuffed Cookies | 3rd | Home Sweet Home Cookie Map |
| Pamela | Badge of Honour Stuffed Cookies | 9th | Dreams of Japan Cookie Map |
| Réjean | Berry Good Stuffed Cookies | 8th | Family Garden Cookie Map |
| Erica | Ginger 'n Spice Stuffed Cookies | 6th | Yummy Ecological Map of Alberta |
| Marcus | East Meets East Stuffed Cookies | 4th | Memory Lane Cookie Map |
| Rita | S'more Please Stuffed Cookies | 5th | Skeleton Track Cookie Map |

=== Episode 3: Savoury Week ===
For the first ever Savoury Week, the bakers had two hours to make twelve samosas with any savoury filling, with a complementary condiment, for the signature challenge. In the technical challenge, the bakers were given 2.5 hours to bake eight Korean garlic cream cheese buns, a popular South Korean street food made with an enriched dough and filled with garlic and onion cream cheese made from scratch. For the showstopper, the bakers had 3.5 hours to bake a wellington, with any flavours, but must have distinct layers and be made of puff pastry.

| Baker | Signature (12 Samosas) | Technical (8 Korean garlic cream cheese buns) | Showstopper (Wellington) |
|---|---|---|---|
| Guillaume | Tourtière du Saguenay Samosas | 1st | Squid-tacular Wellington |
| Jen | Saag Samosa Flowers | 7th | Beet Wellington |
| Patty | Pad Gra Prow Samosas | 8th | Shu Mai Wellington |
| Elora | Secret Spice Chicken Samosas | 2nd | Tikka-Twist Wellington |
| Pamela | Chori-mosas | 6th | Hiker's Treasure Wellington |
| Erica | Tandoori Flames Samosas | 5th | Love My Loaf Wellington |
| Marcus | East Meets Feast Samosas | 4th | Galette de Rois Wellington |
| Rita | Cheeseburger Samosas | 3rd | Sunday Salmon Supper Wellington |

=== Episode 4: Coffee and Tea Week ===
For the first ever Coffee and Tea Week, the bakers had two hours to make a tiramisu in any style, but must have distinct layers and ladyfingers, for the signature challenge. In the technical challenge, the bakers were given two hours to bake a melktert, a South African milk custard tart; as a variation, the recipe included two layers of custard: vanilla milk flavoured layer and a rooibos tea flavoured layer, and dusted in cinnamon and a macadamia nut and rooibos tea brittle. For the showstopper, the bakers had 3 hours and 45 minutes to create a fika display, which must include a cake, buns, and cookies.

| Baker | Signature (Tiramisu) | Technical (Melktert) | Showstopper (Fika display) |
|---|---|---|---|
| Guillaume | Banana-Misu | 5th | Foraging Vikings Fika |
| Jen | Movie Night Tiramisu | 2nd | Folksy Family Fika |
| Elora | Tea Party Tiramisu | 1st | Fruit-Tea Fika |
| Pamela | Revved Up Choco-Hazelnut Tiramisu | 7th | Fika Merienda |
| Erica | Retro Black Forest Tiramisu | 4th | Tea for Three Fika |
| Marcus | Double Mousse Charlotte-Misu | 3rd | Fika of Love |
| Rita | Coffee & Spice Tiramisu | 6th | Fun-Forward Fika |

=== Episode 5: Arts and Crafts Week ===
For first ever Arts and Crafts Week, the bakers had to make a focaccia painting, with the bread as a canvas and the toppings as the painting, in 2 hours and 15 minutes, for the signature challenge. In the technical challenge, the bakers were given 2.5 hours to create two origami entremets. The elaborate dessert is composed of layers of vanilla bean sponge cake, cherry gelée, and white chocolate cherry blossom mousse, encased in a meringue buttercream mould made from a precisely folded paper template, and decorated with tuile, cascading cherry blossom petals, and a paint splatter pattern. For the showstopper, the bakers had 4 hours to bake a cartoon cake, a layered cake decorated to resemble a 2D cartoon image with distinct black outlines.

| Baker | Signature (Focaccia painting) | Technical (2 Origami entremets) | Showstopper (Cartoon cake) |
|---|---|---|---|
| Jen | Ode to Grandma | 3rd | Sad Little Ice Cream Cake |
| Elora | Proud Peacock Focaccia | 4th | Mojito to Go |
| Pamela | Festive Focaccia | 2nd | Mocha Mug Cake |
| Erica | Focaccia-saurus | 1st | Jiggly Jelly Cake |
| Marcus | Mother Nature Focaccia | 5th | Piggy in Pink Cake |
| Rita | A Neck Above the Rest Focaccia | 6th | Road Trip Zoetrope Cake |

=== Episode 6: Nature Week ===
In the first ever Nature Week, the bakers had 2 hours and 15 minutes to make ten critter macarons, made to resemble their favourite animal, for the signature challenge. For the technical challenge, the bakers to bake a m'hancha, a Moroccan dessert named for its resemblance to a coiled snake, in 2 hours. The dessert is made of layers of warqa pastry, wrapped around almond paste flavoured with orange blossom water, lemon zest, and cinnamon, soaked in honey syrup, coiled into circle, and garnished with toasted almonds. For the showstopper, the bakers had 4 hours and 15 minutes to create an edible shadow box featuring a scene from nature, with components made from cookies and cake.

| Baker | Signature (10 critter macarons) | Technical (M'hancha) | Showstopper (Edible shadow box) |
|---|---|---|---|
| Jen | No Prob Llama Macarons | 1st | Land & Sea Shadow Box |
| Elora | Beautiful Butterfly Macarons | 3rd | Into the Woods Shadow Box |
| Pamela | Pup Cup Macarons | 4th | Squash Blossom Field Shadow Box |
| Erica | Mischievous Moose Macarons | 2nd | What Bug Dat? Shadow Box |
| Rita | Cute Caterpillar Macarons | 5th | Whistler Waterfall Shadow Box |

=== Episode 7: Celebration Week ===
In the signature challenge, the bakers were given 2 hours and 15 minutes to create a Diwali sweet box, with a dozen different South Asian treats that could be baked, fried, or cooked. For the technical challenge, the bakers had 2.5 hours to make a Turrón de Doña Pepa, a dessert from Peru made to celebrate El Señor de los Milagros ("Lord of Miracles"). The dessert is made of anise-flavored cookie logs, covered in fruit caramel, and topped with colourful sprinkles made by the bakers. For the showstopper, the bakers had to bake a kek lapis sarawak in 4 hours and 15 minutes.

| Baker | Signature (Diwali sweet box) | Technical (Turrón de Doña Pepa) | Showstopper (Kek lapis sarawak) |
|---|---|---|---|
| Jen | Diwali Gift of Nature | 4th | Waves of Flavour Kek Lapis Sarawak |
| Elora | Bangladeshi Eid Treats | 3rd | Rainbow Sarawak Delight |
| Pamela | Heartfelt Diwali Box | 1st | Royal Velvet Kek Lapis Sarawak |
| Erica | Diwali Dance of Flavours | 2nd | Calming Koi Pond Kek Lapis Sarawak |

=== Episode 8: Finale ===
In the signature challenge, the bakers had to make six elegant tartlets that include two different flavours, in 2 hours and 15 minutes. For the technical challenge, the bakers were given 2.5 hours to make a choux cake. The dessert consisted of two layers of choux buns, filled with crème chiboust and lemon curd, and divided with three large lemon sugar cookie rings. For the first time, the final showstopper challenge involved an all-bread creation. The bakers had 4.5 hours to make a korovai, an Eastern European enriched bread served at weddings, with stacks of three different breads, including at least one bread with a filling, and any theme for decorations.

| Baker | Signature (6 elegant tartlets) | Technical (Choux cake) | Showstopper (Korovai) |
|---|---|---|---|
| Jen | Strawberry Rhubarb Reverie | 1st | Garden Party Pagoda |
| Elora | Mango Magic Tarts | 2nd | Bunny Wedding Korovai |
| Pamela | Citrus Squeeze and Floral Breeze Tarts | 3rd | Old, Blue and New Korovai |
