= The Great Canadian Baking Show season 5 =

Television cooking show

The Great Canadian Baking Show
- Season 5
- Starring: Ann Pornel; Alan Shane Lewis; Bruno Feldeisen; Kyla Kennaley
- No. of episodes: 8

Release
- Original network: CBC Television
- Original release: October 17 – December 5, 2021

Season chronology
- ← Previous; Season 4 Next → The Great Canadian Holiday Baking Show (2021)

The fifth season of The Great Canadian Baking Show premiered on CBC Television on October 17, 2021. As with previous seasons, ten amateur bakers competed over eight weeks of challenges, vying for the title. Ann Pornel and Alan Shane Lewis returned for their second season as hosts. Bruno Feldeisen and Kyla Kennaley returned for their fifth and third seasons respectively as judges.

== Bakers ==
Baker	Age	Profession	Hometown
Aimee DeCruyenaere	23	Industrial design student	Ottawa, ON
Alina Fintineanu	30	Orthodontic dental hygienist	Toronto, ON
Amanda Muirhead	45	Paralegal	Westmoreland, PE
Caron Lau	26	Occupational therapist	Richmond, BC
Dougal Nolan	31	Mental health researcher	Dartmouth, NS
Kunal Ranchod	30	Choreographer	Montreal, QC
Marian Castelino	41	Designer	Ottawa, ON
Stephen Nhan	30	Health administrator	Regina, SK
Steve Levitt	54	Small business owner	Aurora, ON
Vincent Chan	55	Graphic designer	Mississauga, ON

== Results summary ==
Colour key:

Baker was one of the judges' least favourite bakers that week, but was not eliminated.
Baker was one of the judges' favourite bakers that week, but was not the Star Baker.
Baker got through to the next round.
Baker was eliminated.
Baker was the Star Baker.
Baker was a season runner-up.
Baker was the season winner.

Elimination chart
Baker	1	2	3	4	5	6	7	8
Vincent			SB		SB			WINNER
Aimee		SB		SB			SB	Runner Up
Steve	SB							Runner Up
Stephen						SB	OUT	
Amanda						OUT		
Dougal					OUT			
Alina				OUT				
Caron			OUT					
Marian		OUT						
Kunal	OUT							

== Episodes ==
Baker eliminated
Star Baker
Winner

=== Episode 1: Cake ===
For their first signature challenge, the bakers were given two hours to create a decorated pound cake in any flavour of their choice. For the technical challenge, the bakers had an hour and 45 minutes to make 20 lamingtons, with light, fluffy sponge layers, raspberry jam to hold the layers together, and covered with a layer of chocolate glaze and desiccated coconut. For the showstopper, the bakers had three hours and 30 minutes to make a fault line cake - a cake with a decorative crack that creates the illusion of what is within the cake.

Baker	Signature (Pound cake)	Technical (20 Lamingtons)	Showstopper (Fault line cake)
Aimee	Rhubarb Swirl Pound Cake	2nd	Grand Canyon Sunrise Fault Line
Alina	Carrot Crystal Pound Cake	10th	Checkmate Cake
Amanda	Double Decker Pound Cake	8th	Hummingbird Fault Line
Caron	Hong Kong Lemon Tea Pound Cake	4th	Over the Rockies Fault Line
Dougal	East Coast Pound Cake	6th	Ideal Birthday Cake
Kunal	Lemon Blueberry Pound Cake	9th	Kintsugi Cake
Marian	Grapefruit Blackberry Pound Cake	5th	Cherry Blossom Fault Line
Stephen	Pandan Surprise Pound Cake	7th	Ode to Geodes Fault Line
Steve	Chai Butterfly Pound Cake	1st	Queen Bee Cake
Vincent	Candied Lemon Pound Cake	3rd	Champagne Celebration Cake

=== Episode 2: Cookies ===
For the signature challenge for this year's Cookie Week, the nine remaining bakers had two hours 15 minutes to create 12 icebox sandwich cookies, made from a stiff dough that is put in the freezer to further stiffen before it is sliced and baked. They had to ensure the dough was multi-coloured, and that when sliced, would display intricate designs. They also had to create a complementary filling that would be sandwiched between two cookies. For the technical challenge, set by Bruno, the bakers had two hours to create 20 pirouette cookies: a thin, hollow, rolled wafer cookie with a characteristic chocolate stripe, filled with a chocolate hazelnut mixture. For the showstopper challenge, the bakers were allotted 4 hours to create a cookie mosaic, which consisted of colourful cookie tiles arranged in a certain way on a cookie base.

Baker	Signature (12 icebox sandwich cookies)	Technical (20 pirouette cookies)	Showstopper (Cookie mosaic)
Aimee	Savoury Sandwich Cookies	5th	Vintage Cookie Lamp
Alina	Toy Block Cookies	2nd	Postcard from Santorini
Amanda	Perfectly Pear Cookies	7th	Cookie Map of PEI
Caron	Passionate for Passionfruit Cookies	8th	Cookie Rainbow Estate
Dougal	Zesty Blueberry Cookies	3rd	Buzz-worthy Mosaic
Marian	Kek Lapis Cookies	9th	Window into Bahrain Mosaic
Stephen	Strawberry Lemonade Cookies	4th	Achy Bakey Heart
Steve	Lemon and Rasp-Beary Cookies	1st	Easy Ride Mosaic
Vincent	Garden of Roses Cookies	6th	Lotus Garden

=== Episode 3: Celebration ===
For the signature challenge, the bakers were given two hours to create eclairs for a special occasion. For the technical challenge, the bakers were given two and a half hours to make a spider web mirror glaze cake, with layers of sponge and mousse over a peanut base, topped with a shiny mirror finish, and applying a spiderweb pattern and tuille. For the showstopper, the bakers were give four hours to complete a wedding centrepiece made of multiple types of meringue.

Baker	Signature (12 Special occasion eclairs)	Technical (Spiderweb mirror glaze cake)	Showstopper (Meringue wedding centrepiece)
Aimee	Year of the Tiger Eclairs	2nd	Butterfly Garden Wedding Centrepiece
Alina	Engagement Eclairs	6th	Tropical Wedding Centrepiece
Amanda	"Oh, Canada!" Eclairs	7th	Ode To My Sister Wedding Centrepiece
Caron	Convocation Eclairs	4th	Christmas Wedding Centrepiece
Dougal	Santa's Jacket Eclairs	3rd	Winter Woodland Wedding Centrepiece
Stephen	Ode to Mom Eclairs	8th	Floral Wedding Centrepiece
Steve	Happy 21st Birthday Eclairs	5th	Campfire Wedding Centrepiece
Vincent	Cherry Blossom Festival Eclairs	1st	Pretty in Pink Wedding Centrepiece

=== Episode 4: Bread ===
The signature challenge saw the bakers bake a babka, a braided bread with either a sweet or savoury filling, in two and a half hours. The technical challenge gave the bakers two and a half hours to bake 12 bolo bao, or pineapple buns, named for the characteristic topping that resembles the texture of a pineapple. The bakers also had to make their own butter to insert into six of their twelve pineapple buns to create the bolo yau ("buttered pineapple") variant. For the showstopper, the bakers were given four and a half hours to bake and create an elaborate bread basket, with at least two kinds of bread. The "basket" holding the baker's bread could be any shape or type of vessel, as long as it was also made of bread.

Baker	Signature (Babka)	Technical (12 Bolo bao)	Showstopper (Elaborate bread basket)
Aimee	Herb Garden Babka	3rd	Buns in the Oven
Alina	Nuts About Chocolate Babka	7th	Basket of Flours
Amanda	Twelve Days of Babka	2nd	All-a-Bread to PEI Boat
Dougal	"It's My Jam" Babka	4th	Brunch Platter
Stephen	Dutch Dreams Babka	5th	Ode to Cheese and Dough
Steve	Christmukkah Babka	1st	Love Boat
Vincent	Gilded Star Babka	6th	Knitting Bowl of Kittens

=== Episode 5: Pies and Tarts ===
In the signature challenge, the bakers had two hours to bake a sweet pie or tart inspired by a particular province of Canada. For the technical challenge, the bakers were given two hours and fifteen minutes to bake 14 pastéis de nata, Portuguese egg custard tarts. In the showstopper challenge, the bakers needed to produce two-tiered hand-raised pies using hot water crust pastry with two distinct flavours and at least two layers within the pie in four and half hours.

Baker	Signature (Provincial Pie or Tart)	Technical (14 Pastéis de Nata)	Showstopper (Tiered Hand-raised Pies)
Aimee	Peaches and Cream Tart	5th	Pasta Dinner Pies
Amanda	Mile High PEI Lemon Pie	6th	Maritime Fast Food Pies
Dougal	Summer on the East Coast Pie	2nd	"Hold the Meat" Pies
Stephen	Prairie Berry Pie	3rd	Peruvian & Pork Pies
Steve	Top of Superior Pie	1st	Deli & Diner Pies
Vincent	Blueberry-Lime Trillium Pie	4th	All in the Family Pies

=== Episode 6: Caramel ===
For the first ever caramel signature challenge, the bakers had to make florentines with tempered chocolate, with 12 each in two different flavours for a total of 24 biscuits, in two hours. In the technical challenge, the bakers had an hour and 45 minutes to make a baker's dozen of doughnuts made of a yeast-based dough, with a caramel praline pastry cream filling and caramel glaze with praline topping. For the showstopper challenge, the bakers had four hours to bake a caramel layer cake of any design and flavour as long as caramel was the featured element.

Baker	Signature (24 Florentines)	Technical (13 Caramel doughnuts)	Showstopper (Caramel layer cake)
Aimee	Rise & Shine Florentines	1st	Nuts for Bananas Bake
Amanda	Silver Anniversary Florentines	2nd	Fall for Caramel Cake
Stephen	Sweet & Spicy Florentines	5th	Night at the Movies Cake
Steve	Heart & Soul Florentines	4th	Choux-in for a Win Cake
Vincent	Chinese-Canadian Florentines	3rd	Fairest of Them All Cake

=== Episode 7: Patisserie ===
For the signature challenge, the bakers had two hours and forty-five minutes to bake 16 vol-au-vents with two different fillings. For the technical challenge, the bakers had two hours to make a baba au rhum without a mixer. For the showstopper challenge, the bakers had four hours to bake 36 petit fours of any design and flavour; the bakers had to bake 12 each of 3 types, each with their own respective flavours.

Baker	Signature (16 Vol-au-vents)	Technical (Baba au rhum)	Showstopper (36 petit fours)
Aimee	Pineapple & Avocado Two Ways Vol-au-Vents	1st	Jewelry Box Petit Fours
Stephen	Luxurious Lobster & Blackberry Vol-au-Vents	2nd	Summer Tea Party Petit Fours
Steve	Dinner & Dessert Vol-au-Vents	4th	Redemption Petit Fours
Vincent	Hot & Cool Vol-au-Vents	3rd	Garden Party Petit Fours

=== Episode 8: Finale ===
For the final Signature challenge of the season, the finalists had to create a multi-layer mousse tart in 2 hours 15 minutes, making sure the layers of their creations were distinct and well set. For the final Technical challenge, the bakers had 2 hours 45 minutes to make 10 delizie al limone, an Italian dessert composed of a sponge cake base with lemon pastry cream, lemon curd, lemon whipped cream and limoncello syrup. The last Showstopper challenge (and last challenge overall) of the season saw the finalists create a baking journey cake in 4 and a half hours; the cake had to tell a story about their evolution as bakers.

Baker	Signature (Mousse tart)	Technical (10 Delizie al limone)	Showstopper (Baking journey cake)
Aimee	Sweet Pea Garden Tart	1st	Turtle Extravaganza
Steve	Lime in the Coconut Mousse Tart	3rd	Dessert Tower
Vincent	Mojito Madness Mousse Tart	2nd	Journey to Elegance
