= The Great Canadian Baking Show season 4 =

Television cooking show

The Great Canadian Baking Show
- Season 4
- Starring: Ann Pornel; Alan Shane Lewis; Bruno Feldeisen; Kyla Kennaley
- No. of episodes: 8

Release
- Original network: CBC Television
- Original release: February 14 – April 4, 2021

Season chronology
- ← Previous; The Great Canadian Holiday Baking Show Next → Season 5

The fourth season of The Great Canadian Baking Show premiered on CBC Television on February 14, 2021. As with previous seasons, ten amateur bakers will compete over eight weeks of challenges, vying for the title. The season marked the debut of Ann Pornel and Alan Shane Lewis as hosts, who replaced Carolyn Taylor and Aurora Browne. Bruno Feldeisen and Kyla Kennaley returned for their fourth and second seasons respectively as judges.

== Bakers ==
Baker	Age	Profession	Hometown
Anjali Helferty	36	Recent PhD graduate	Toronto, ON
Bertie Diaz	54	Corporate travel agent	Toronto, ON
Dominike Audet	42	Radio host and novelist	Quebec, QC
Larry Harris	53	Business operations manager	Edmonton, AB
Maggie Frith	42	Stay-at-home mom and former lawyer	Toronto, ON
Mahathi Mundluru	24	Business analyst	Markham, ON
Oyakhire "Oyaks" Airende	28	Project scheduler and engineer	Calgary, AB
Raufikat Oyawoye	35	IT support engineer	Milton, ON
Sheldon Lynn	25	Software developer	Vancouver, BC
Tanner Davies	28	Marketing consultant	Winnipeg, MB

== Results summary ==
Colour key:

Baker was one of the judges' least favourite bakers that week, but was not eliminated.
Baker was one of the judges' favourite bakers that week, but was not the Star Baker.
Baker got through to the next round.
Baker was eliminated.
Baker was the Star Baker.
Baker was a season runner-up.
Baker was the season winner.

Elimination chart
Baker	1	2	3	4	5	6	7	8
Raufikat					SB		SB	WINNER
Tanner						SB		Runner Up
Mahathi			SB					Runner Up
Maggie							OUT	
Sheldon				SB		OUT		
Larry		SB			OUT			
Dominike				OUT				
Oyaks	SB		OUT					
Anjali		OUT						
Bertie	OUT							

== Episodes ==
Baker eliminated
Star Baker
Winner

=== Episode 1: Cake ===
For their first signature challenge, the bakers were given one hour and forty-five minutes to create a bundt cake that was topped with either a complementary glaze or drizzle. For the technical challenge, the bakers had to make a cupid cake — a vertically-striped red velvet cake with a Swiss meringue buttercream icing, topped with tempered ruby chocolate decorations—in two hours. For the showstopper, the bakers had three and a half hours to create a mirror glaze cake; their cake could be in whatever flavour they wanted, but the cake had to be multi-tiered to allow the mirror glaze to cascade down the cake.

Baker	Signature (Bundt cake)	Technical (Cupid cake)	Showstopper (Cascading mirror glaze cake)
Anjali	Baton Rouge Bundt Cake	8th	Social Movement Mirror Glaze Cake
Bertie	Memories of Cuba Bundt Cake	10th	Hello Broadway Mirror Glaze Cake
Dominike	Cabane à Sucre Bundt Cake	6th	Pink Dream Mirror Glaze Cake
Larry	Fig & Apricot Bundt Cake	5th	The Dog Ate My Mirror Glaze Cake
Maggie	Lemon Blueberry Bundt Cake	9th	Up & Away Mirror Glaze Cake
Mahathi	Gulab Jamun Bundt Cake	2nd	Chasing Waterfalls Mirror Glaze Cake
Oyaks	Chai Spice Bundt Cake	3rd	Piña Colada Mirror Glaze Cake
Raufikat	Lime and Coconut Bundt Cake	1st	Chocolate Hazelnut Mirror Glaze Cake
Sheldon	Lucky Dragon Bundt Cake	4th	Georgia O'Keeffe Mirror Glaze Cake
Tanner	Citrus & Floral Bundt Cake	7th	Water Lilies Mirror Glaze Cake

=== Episode 2: Bread ===
For the signature challenge, the bakers had two and a half hours to create a tarte tropézienne, along with a complementary cream filling. The bakers were asked by Kyla in the technical challenge to bake one dozen soft pretzels, along with a complementary zesty cheese dip, in two and a half hours. For the showstopper, the bakers were to make a two-tiered bread centrepiece that showcased at least two different types of bread in four hours.

Baker	Signature (Tarte tropézienne)	Technical (12 pretzels and zesty cheese dip)	Showstopper (Two-tiered bread centrepiece)
Anjali	Grass is Greener Tropézienne	5th	Eguzkilore Centrepiece
Dominike	Sunny Days Tropézienne	8th	Foodie Fantasy Centrepiece
Larry	Pastel Perfection Tropézienne	1st	Ode to France Centrepiece
Maggie	Chai Latte Tropézienne	4th	Mad Hatter Centrepiece
Mahathi	Orange and Pomegranate Tropézienne	2nd	Sea Slug Centrepiece
Oyaks	Going for Gold Tropézienne	7th	Duck Duck Fruit Centrepiece
Raufikat	Maple Walnut Tropézienne	9th	Sweet and Savoury Centrepiece
Sheldon	B.C. Summer Tropézienne	3rd	Char Siu Centrepiece
Tanner	Caramel Macchiato Tropézienne	6th	Spanish Sunflower Centrepiece

=== Episode 3: Cookies ===
The signature challenge saw the bakers bake 18 identical Linzer cookies in 90 minutes. For this week's technical, Bruno set the bakers the challenge of making 12 stroopwafels in 1 hour 45 minutes. In the showstopper challenge, the bakers were given 3 and a half hours to create a family portrait cookie sculpture. The sculpture could be either two- or three-dimensional, but it had to be made of at least two types of cookies and it had to incorporate the use of royal icing.

Baker	Signature (18 Linzer cookies)	Technical (12 stroopwafels)	Showstopper (Family portrait sculpture)
Dominike	Double Linzers	3rd	Cozy Home
Larry	Hazelnut and Jam Linzers	2nd	Family Meal
Maggie	Great Grandma's Linzers	6th	Holiday Farmhouse
Mahathi	Classical Linzers	1st	Diwali Cookie Celebration
Oyaks	Mango Jam Linzers	5th	Dad's Library
Raufikat	Vanilla Sun & Mocha Moon Linzers	4th	Knock Knock Giggles
Sheldon	Mosaic Linzers	8th	Immigration Story
Tanner	Crown Jewels Linzers	7th	Postcard from the Falls

=== Episode 4: Italian ===
The bakers, in this week's Signature challenge, had to create 24 biscotti in two different flavours in 1 hour 30 minutes. The Technical challenge required the bakers to make 12 Italian puff pastry cream horns, also known as cannoncini, in 3 hours 15 minutes, the program's longest technical challenge ever. For the Showstopper challenge, the bakers had 4 hours to create a tower at least 3 feet tall made of at least three different sweet or savoury Italian treats.

Baker	Signature (24 biscotti)	Technical (12 cannoncini)	Showstopper (Italian pastry tower)
Dominike	PB & C Biscotti	7th	"That's Amore" Tower
Larry	Pistachio & Cherry Almond Biscotti	3rd	Torre Geniale
Maggie	Family Favourite Treats	4th	Wedding Tower
Mahathi	Taste of Jamaica	1st	Fashion Week Tower
Raufikat	Mum and Dad Biscotti	6th	Tower of Tuscany
Sheldon	Memories of Summer Camp Biscotti	2nd	Magical Italian Tower
Tanner	Buon Natale Biscotti	5th	Calabrese Tower

=== Episode 5: Botanical ===
For the first ever botanical Signature challenge, the bakers were given 2 hours to make 8 mini fruit tarts, using any combination of custard, pastry cream, frangipane, and fruit that they wanted. In the Technical challenge, set by Kyla, the bakers had 1 hour 45 minutes to cook 16 pan-fried herb garden dumplings, along with an accompanying scallion sauce. The two-toned dumpling wrappers were made of two doughs combined together, with one dough the traditional white colour and the other tinted green with spinach juice. For the Showstopper challenge, the bakers had 4 hours to create a two-tier cake that showcased the week's theme: the cake had to incorporate a botanical element, and the bakers had to demonstrate their decorating skills by making handmade, edible flowers (whether through buttercream, sugar paste, or the use of a palette knife) to adorn the cake.

Baker	Signature (8 mini fruit tarts)	Technical (16 garden dumplings)	Showstopper (Two-tier floral cake)
Larry	Dragon Ball Fruit Tarts	4th	Mediterranean Garden Cake
Maggie	Lavender Peach Tarts	5th	Garden Party Cake
Mahathi	Fresh Tropi-fruit Tarts	6th	Encyclopedia Botanica Cake
Raufikat	Brown Butter Berry Tarts	1st	Hibiscus Raspberry Cake
Sheldon	Tanghulu Strawberry Tarts	2nd	Flower Power Cake
Tanner	Little Tarts of Sunshine	3rd	Australian Outback Cake

=== Episode 6: Pastry ===
For the quarter-final Signature challenge, the bakers were tasked with mastering the art of strudel pastry dough, by creating a strudel that was at least 12 inches long, and filled with either a savoury or sweet component in two and a half hours. For the Technical challenge, bakers were given a pared-down recipe of a Bakewell tart—a classic British tart consisting of a pâte sablée crust, raspberry jam, frangipane, two-toned icing with a feathered design, and topped with a half glacé cherry—which they had to make in two and a half hours. The Showstopper challenge required the bakers to create a vegetable tart using at least three different types of colourful vegetables in two and a half hours.

Baker	Signature (Sweet or savoury strudel)	Technical (Bakewell tart)	Showstopper (Vegetable tart)
Maggie	Caramel Pear Strudel	5th	Root Vegetable Tart
Mahathi	Palak Paneer Strudel	3rd	Coconut Curry Vegetable Tart
Raufikat	Chicken Pot Pie Strudel	1st	"Favourite Veggie" Vegetable Tart
Sheldon	Sticky Rice & Pork Strudel	4th	Malaysian Sunset Vegetable Tart
Tanner	Wild Rice & Mushroom Strudel	2nd	"Wise Owl" Vegetable Tart

=== Episode 7: Fancy Desserts ===
For the semi-final Signature challenge, the bakers had three hours to bake 12 mini entremets. The Technical challenge, set by Bruno, saw the bakers make a passion chocolate charlotte in 2 hours 15 minutes; the cake contained six individual elements—two mousses, a chocolate ladyfinger lining, a passion fruit gelée, chocolate passion fruit ganache, and chocolate cookie crumble—which forced the bakers to closely follow the pared-down recipe, as well as their instincts, to ensure the elements were set on time. The penultimate Showstopper challenge featured the bakers making a meringue cake in three and a half hours; they could use either curd, custard or cream in any flavour between the meringue layers, but the meringue itself had to crunch when cut into to be served.

Baker	Signature (12 mini entremets)	Technical (Passion chocolate charlotte)	Showstopper (Meringue crunch cake)
Maggie	Summer Strawberry Entremets	3rd	Blackberry Lime Crunch Cake
Mahathi	Taste of Thailand Entremets	4th	Ancient Aztec Crunch Cake
Raufikat	Choco-Orange Entremets	1st	Tropical Tang Crunch Cake
Tanner	Southern Charm Entremets	2nd	Blueberry Banana Crunch Cake

=== Episode 8: Finale ===
For the final Signature challenge of the season, the three finalists had two and a half hours to create a bombe, which had to feature at least two different types of ice cream on top of a sponge cake base. For the final Technical challenge, the bakers had two hours forty-five minutes to create a gâteau St-Honoré, a classic French cake which forced the bakers to demonstrate their mastery of puff, choux pastry and crème Chiboust, all while working with a heavily pared-down recipe. For the final Showstopper, the bakers had four and a half hours to create a treat trolley, which had to consist of one picturesque pie, six mini cakes, six viennoiseries and eight elegant cookies, for a total of 21 items.

Baker	Signature (Bombe)	Technical (Gâteau St-Honoré)	Showstopper (Treat Trolley)
Mahathi	Pineapple Bombe	1st	Around the World in 4 Bakes
Raufikat	Ice Cream Sundae Bombe	2nd	Sweet Wedding Dreams
Tanner	Sophisticated Bombe	3rd	Symphony of Berries
