= The Great Canadian Baking Show season 1 =

Season 1 of television series

The Great Canadian Baking Show
- Season 1
- Starring: Dan Levy; Julia Chan; Bruno Feldeisen; Rochelle Adonis
- No. of episodes: 8

Release
- Original network: CBC Television
- Original release: November 1 – December 20, 2017

Season chronology
- Next → Season 2

The first season of The Great Canadian Baking Show premiered on CBC Television on November 1, 2017. Ten amateur bakers competed over eight weeks of challenges throughout the competition for the title.

This season was hosted by Canadian actor and television personality Dan Levy and British actress Julia Chan. The judging panel consisted of French chef Bruno Feldeisen, a multiple James Beard Award nominee and the former executive pastry chef for Four Seasons Hotels in New York and Vancouver, and Canadian-Australian pastry chef Rochelle Adonis, the European-trained creator of an eponymous high tea salon and confectionery brand in Australia.

After eight weeks of competition, Sabrina Degni was crowned the winner with Vandana Jain and Linda Longson as runners-up.

== Bakers ==
Baker	Age	Profession	Hometown
Corey Shefman	31	Human rights lawyer	Toronto, ON
James Hoyland	45	Physics professor	Richmond, BC
Jude Somers	60	Retired animator	Victoria, BC
Julian D'Entremont	45	Contractor	Halifax, NS
Linda Longson	63	Payroll supervisor	High River, AB
Pierre Morin	56	Retired musician and dentist	Cantley, QC
Sabrina Degni	24	Graphic designer	Montreal, QC
Sinclair Shuit	44	Optometrist	London, ON
Terri Thompson	36	Domestic engineer	Sherwood Park, AB
Vandana Jain	36	Chief financial officer	Regina, SK

== Results summary ==
Colour key:

Baker was one of the judges' least favourite bakers that week, but was not eliminated.
Baker was one of the judges' favourite bakers that week, but was not the Star Baker.
Baker got through to the next round.
Baker was eliminated.
Baker was the Star Baker.

Baker was a season runner-up.
Baker was the season winner.

Elimination chart
Baker	1	2	3	4	5	6	7	8
Sabrina		SB						WINNER
Linda			SB				SB	Runner Up
Vandana					SB			Runner Up
James				SB			OUT	
Terri	SB					OUT		
Julian					OUT			
Jude				OUT				
Corey			OUT					
Sinclair		OUT						
Pierre	OUT							

== Episodes ==
Baker eliminated
Star Baker
Winner

=== Episode 1: Cake ===
For the signature challenge, the bakers were given two hours to make 24 cupcakes with two different types of flavours. The technical challenge was to create a cherry and pistachio Battenberg cake – a recipe handpicked by Rochelle – with the marzipan, fondant, and jam provided to them. The bakers had an hour and 45 minutes to complete the cake, making sure to expose the ends of the cake as traditionally presented. For the showstopper, the bakers had four hours to make a chocolate layer cake with at least two layers and at least two different kinds of chocolate.

Baker	Signature (24 cupcakes)	Technical (Battenberg cake)	Showstopper (Chocolate layer cake)
Corey	Chocolate Beer and Maple Whiskey Cupcakes	2nd	Milk & Cookies Cake
James	Ginger Stout and Apple Oatmeal Cupcakes	5th	Chocolate Record Player
Jude	Breakfast Banana Maple and Saskatoon Berry Cupcakes	4th	Chocolate Ginger Gnome Cake
Julian	Birch Syrup and Chocolate Cream Liqueur Cupcakes	8th	Builder's Cake
Linda	Nanaimo Bar and Lemon Cupcakes	3rd	Chocolate Raspberry Layer Cake
Pierre	Chocolate Raspberry and White Chocolate Pistachio Cupcakes	9th	Elysée Cake
Sabrina	Tiramisu and Cookies & Cream Cupcakes	6th	Melted Ice Cream Cone Cake
Sinclair	Whiskey Cream and Mojito and Lime Cupcakes	10th	Galaxy Glaze Cake
Terri	Cotton Candy and Carrot Cake Cupcakes	7th	Chocolate Raspberry & Pistachio Layer Cake
Vandana	Chocolate Rose & Coconut Key Lime Cupcakes	1st	Chocolate Hazelnut Cake

=== Episode 2: Bread ===
For the signature challenge, the bakers were given two hours and 30 minutes to make a flavourful focaccia in whatever shape they chose. The technical challenge was to bake one dozen Montreal bagels: six with poppy seeds and six with sesame seeds. The bakers had two hours and 10 minutes to complete the bagels, ensuring they were properly poached in honey water to achieve subtle sweetness and the balance of a crispy crust and chewy centre. For the showstopper, the bakers had four hours to make a bread-based centrepiece with one or more sweet fillings.

Baker	Signature (Focaccia)	Technical (24 Montreal bagels)	Showstopper (Sweet bread centrepiece)
Corey	Moroccan Focaccia	8th	Tree of Life Challah
James	Blue Cheese and Walnut Focaccia	9th	Middle Eastern Star Bread
Jude	Italian Boot Focaccia	2nd	Paint Pot Centrepiece
Julian	East Coast Focaccia	6th	Cinnamon Bun Kraken
Linda	Traditional Focaccia	3rd	Bread Flower Basket
Sabrina	Italian Pride Focaccia	4th	Bread Basket
Sinclair	Parmesan and Herb Focaccia	5th	Walnut Bread Wreath with Puff-Pastry Pear
Terri	Family Favourite Focaccia	1st	Caramel Apple Centrepiece
Vandana	Mediterranean Focaccia	7th	Winter Melon and Cashew Wreath

=== Episode 3: Dessert ===
For the signature challenge, the bakers were given two hours to make a sweet pie or tart. The technical challenge was to bake one dozen Fondant Fancies, small sponge cake squares glazed with butter cream and then drizzled in fondant. The bakers had two hours to complete the fancies, ensuring they were all equally square and properly coated in fondant. For the showstopper, the bakers had three hours to make a pavlova.

Baker	Signature (Sweet pie or tart)	Technical (12 Fondant Fancies)	Showstopper (Pavlova)
Corey	Pear & Salted Chocolate Pie	7th	Pumpkin Pie Pavlova
James	Pi Pie	6th	Chocolate Plum Pavlova
Jude	Pumpkin Cashew Tart	5th	Pavlova Music Box
Julian	Lemon Meringue Pie	8th	Wild Blueberry Pavlova
Linda	Raspberry Swirl Pie	2nd	Pavlova Wreath
Sabrina	Tropical Delight Tart	3rd	Raspberry Rose Pavlova
Terri	Northern Lights Tart	4th	Peaches & Cream Pavlova
Vandana	Mango Ginger Cream Pie	1st	Saffron Cardamom Pavlova

=== Episode 4: Canadian ===
For the signature challenge, the bakers were given two hours to bake a tourtière. They were allowed to fill the pie with whatever they wanted, but had to also make a condiment to complement the pie. In the technical, the bakers were given one hour and forty-five minutes to make sixteen maple leaf cream cookies. The showstopper challenge was to make twelve doughnuts – six in one flavour and six in another – in three hours.

Baker	Signature (Tourtière)	Technical (16 Maple leaf cream cookies)	Showstopper (12 doughnuts)
James	Saucy Vegetarian Tourtière	2nd	Okanagan Peach Beignet and French Cruller
Jude	Tourtière à la Vancouver Island	7th	Sea to Sea Donuts
Julian	Halifax Donair Tourtière	3rd	Glazed Canoe and Nova Scotia Rum Runner Donuts
Linda	Traditional Tourtière	1st	Maple Bacon and Double Double Donuts
Sabrina	Homestyle Tourtière	5th	S'mores and Poutine Donuts
Terri	Christmas Eve Tourtière	6th	Marshmallow Puff and Maple Glazed Donuts
Vandana	Chickpea & Cashew Tourtière	4th	Saskatoon Berry White Chocolate and Sour Cherry Lemonade Donuts

=== Episode 5: Best of Britain ===
For the Best of Britain Signature challenge, the bakers had 2 hours to create a trifle, making sure that there were clearly defined layers of sponge cake, custard, cream, fresh fruit and jelly, along with a boozy element to the dish. In the Technical challenge, the bakers were given an hour and a half to create 20 brandy snaps, a popular British snack consisting of a thin, sugary biscuit rolled into a cylinder and filled with whipped cream. For the Showstopper challenge, the bakers had 4 hours to create a high tea platter. The bakers needed to create at least 3 different bakes, totalling 18 items on the platter, they needed to be an assortment of sweet and savoury delights, and there needed to be an overall theme to the high tea platter.

Baker	Signature (Trifle)	Technical (20 Brandy snaps)	Showstopper (High Tea)
James	Gin & Blueberry Trifle	3rd	British High Tea
Julian	Mixed Berry Trifle with Chocolate Ganache	6th	East Coast High Tea
Linda	Raspberry Lemon Trifle	4th	Albertan High Tea
Sabrina	Strawberry Swirl Trifle	1st	Peach High Tea
Terri	Strawberry Rhubarb Trifle	2nd	High Tea with Nan
Vandana	Mango Kiwi Strawberry Trifle	5th	Maharaja High Tea

=== Episode 6: Holiday Baking ===
For the first ever Holiday-themed week in the tent, the bakers had two and a half hours to create a bûche de Noël, a Christmas cake traditionally served in French-speaking countries. The bakers had 1 hour and 45 minutes to create 32 rugelach, a Jewish crescent-shaped filled pastry product traditionally enjoyed around Hanukkah; the bakers had to fill half of them with apricot jam and the other half with chocolate. For the Showstopper challenge, the bakers had 4 and a half hours to create an elaborate gingerbread structure.

Baker	Signature (Bûche de Noël)	Technical (32 Rugelach)	Showstopper (Gingerbread house)
James	Chocolate Orange Roll	1st	Gingerbread Eco-Home
Linda	Pumpkin Caramel Roll	4th	Gingerbread Barn
Sabrina	Gingerbread Spice Roll	3rd	Gingerbread Rockefeller Center
Terri	Birch Tree Yule Log	5th	Gingerbread Dream Home
Vandana	Chocolate Cherry Log	2nd	Gingerbread Treehouse

=== Episode 7: French Pâtisserie ===
In the semi-final Signature challenge, the bakers had two hours to create 12 mille-feuille. The pastries had to be in two different flavours, have at three different layers of puff pastry, and a complementary filling. The semi-final Technical, set by Bruno, saw the bakers make an Opera cake - a dessert made of almond joconde sponge soaked in coffee syrup, layered with chocolate buttercream and ganache, topped with a chocolate glaze, along with the word "Opera" elegantly piped in chocolate on top - in two hours 15 minutes. For the penultimate Showstopper challenge, the bakers were given four hours to create a croquembouche, a pastry tower consisting of cream-filled choux pastry puffs bound in spun sugar. The bakers were given free range with flavour and decoration of their creation.

Baker	Signature (12 Mille-feuille)	Technical (Opera cake)	Showstopper (Croquembouche)
James	Strawberry Basil and Blackberry-Balsamic Reduction Mille Feuille	1st	Coconut Custard Chocolate & Raspberry Croquembouche
Linda	Raspberry White Chocolate and Cardamom-Caramel Mille Feuille	3rd	Mascarpone & Coffee Croquembouche
Sabrina	Strawberry-Pistachio and Mango-Coconut Mille Feuille	2nd	Vanilla Mousseline Croquembouche
Vandana	Rooh Afza and Raspberries & Lemon-Pistachio Cream Mille Feuille	4th	Mint Chocolate & Orange Croquembouche

=== Episode 8: Finale ===
For the final Signature challenge, the bakers had 2 and a half hours to create 24 mini mousse cakes, which had to be in two different varieties. The final Technical challenge, set by Bruno, saw the judges ask the bakers to create a pear charlotte in 2 hours 20 minutes; the various components in creating the cake featured techniques that the judges felt the finalists struggled with in the past seven weeks. For their very last Showstopper (and the final challenge of the season), the three finalists had to create a wedding cake that was at least three tiers high in four hours' time.

Baker	Signature (24 mini mousse cakes)	Technical (Pear charlotte)	Showstopper (Three-tiered wedding cake)
Linda	Pineapple Coconut and Cherry Chocolate Mousse Cakes	1st	Carrot Wedding Cake
Sabrina	Blueberry Apricot and Strawberry Mousse Cakes	2nd	Pink Champagne Wedding Cake
Vandana	Passionfruit and White Chocolate Mousse Cakes	3rd	Red Velvet Wedding Cake
