= The Great Canadian Baking Show season 2 =

The Great Canadian Baking Show
- Season 2
- Starring: Dan Levy; Julia Chan; Bruno Feldeisen; Rochelle Adonis
- No. of episodes: 8

Release
- Original network: CBC Television
- Original release: September 19 – November 7, 2018

Season chronology
- ← Previous; Season 1 Next → Season 3

The second season of The Great Canadian Baking Show premiered on CBC Television on September 19, 2018. Ten amateur bakers competed over eight weeks of challenges throughout the competition for the title. Canadian actor and television personality Dan Levy and Canadian-British actress Julia Chan returned as hosts, with French-born Canadian chef Bruno Feldeisen and Canadian-Australian pastry chef Rochelle Adonis also returning as judges. For the second season, producer Marike Emery stated that the audition process prioritized "skill over personality" and that the tasks would be more challenging than the first season.

After eight weeks of competition, Andrei Godoroja was crowned the winner with Sachin Seth and Megan Stasiewich as runners-up.

This was also the last season for hosts Dan Levy and Julia Chan, as well as judge Rochelle Adonis.

== Bakers ==
Baker	Age	Profession	Hometown
Andrei Godoroja	58	Software engineering consultant	Vancouver, BC
Ann Marie Whitten	49	Operations manager	Pickering, ON
Devon Stolz	27	Substitute teacher, gravestone carver	Regina, SK
Megan Stasiewich	30	Hairstylist	Leduc, AB
Mengling Chen	30	Market research consultant	Toronto, ON
Sachin Seth	43	Dentist, university professor	Halifax, NS
Sadiya Hashmi	38	Homeschooling mom	Edmonton, AB
Timothy Fu	19	Undergraduate student	Edmonton, AB
Tim Chauvin	38	Hardware store assistant manager	Brockville, ON
Wendy McIsaac	54	Senior policy analyst	Cornwall, PE

== Results summary ==
Colour key:

Baker was one of the judges' least favourite bakers that week, but was not eliminated.
Baker was one of the judges' favourite bakers that week, but was not the Star Baker.
Baker got through to the next round.
Baker was eliminated.
Baker was the Star Baker.

Baker was a season runner-up.
Baker was the season winner.

Elimination chart
Baker	1	2	3	4	5	6	7	8
Andrei	SB				SB			WINNER
Sachin		SB				SB		Runner Up
Megan				SB			SB	Runner Up
Mengling							OUT	
Timothy						OUT		
Devon					OUT			
Sadiya			SB	OUT				
Ann Marie			OUT					
Wendy		OUT						
Tim	OUT							

== Episodes ==
Baker eliminated
Star Baker
Winner

=== Episode 1: Cake ===
The inaugural Signature Challenge had the bakers make an upside-down fruit cake with any ingredients of their choosing to put "on top," with two hours to create it. The Technical Challenge involved the bakers creating an orange chiffon cake - along with an orange glaze and candied orange toppings - in two hours. The Showstopper Challenge featured the bakers creating a birthday cake - with at least three layers and two different flavours - for anyone of their choosing, all within four hours.

Baker	Signature (Upside down cake)	Technical (Orange chiffon cake)	Showstopper (Birthday cake)
Andrei	Rhubarb Parquet Upside Down Cake	3rd	Queen for a Day Cake
Ann Marie	Rosemary Fig Upside Down Cake	6th	Happy Hour Cake
Devon	Mango Gingerbread Upside Down Cake	4th	Coconut Matcha Cake
Megan	Mango Berry Upside Down Cheesecake	8th	Day of the Dead Cake
Mengling	Apple Pecan Bourbon Cake with Maple Caramel	2nd	Blueberry Lime Naked Cake
Sachin	Chai Spice Pear Upside Down Cake	1st	S'mores Birthday Cake
Sadiya	Pistachio Cardamom Cranberry Cake	5th	Party in the Jungle Cake
Timothy	Pear & Lemon Dark Chocolate Upside Down Cake	10th	Remains of a Phoenix Cake
Tim	Triple Berry Lemon Upside Down Cake	7th	Coconut Chocolate Ocean Cake
Wendy	Sticky Banana Upside Down Cake	9th	Anne of Green Gables Cake

=== Episode 2: Biscuits and Bars ===
For the Signature challenge, the bakers had to make 24 dessert bars with at least 3 distinct layers in two hours. For the Technical Challenge, bakers had to make 18 digestive biscuits topped with tempered chocolate in 1 hour 30 minutes. In the Showstopper Challenge, the bakers had 4 1/2 hours to bake 36 identical cookies to be placed inside an edible and elaborate biscuit box.

Baker	Signature (24 Dessert bars)	Technical (18 Chocolate Digestive biscuits)	Showstopper (Edible biscuit box)
Andrei	Chocolate Frangipane Pear Bars	4th	Grand Piano Biscuit Box
Ann Marie	Chocolate Coffee Nanaimo Bars	6th	Jellybean Row Biscuit Box
Devon	Mascarpone Date Squares	3rd	Classroom Library Shelf
Megan	Movie Night Indulgence Bars	1st	Galaxy Cookie Box
Mengling	Walnut Green Tea Bars	5th	Treasure Box
Sachin	Piña Colada Bars	2nd	Fall Harvest Cookie Basket
Sadiya	Brownie Cheesecake Bars	8th	Around the World Cookie Tray
Timothy	Red Bean & Sticky Rice Bars	7th	Gingerbread GO Box
Wendy	Pistachio Lime Delights	9th	By the Sea Cookie Shell

=== Episode 3: Bread ===
For the Signature Challenge, the bakers had to produce two loaves (or 12 pieces) of a quick bread (a bread which does not use yeast) along with a homemade spread in one and a half hours. The Technical Challenge required to the bakers to create 20 uniform hot cross buns, including an apricot glaze, in two and a half hours. In the Showstopper Challenge, bakers had four and a half hours to create a sandwich cake, including decorations and a proper balance of bread and filling.

Baker	Signature (Quick bread)	Technical (20 Hot cross buns)	Showstopper (Sandwich cake)
Andrei	"Russian Blini" Soda Bread	1st	"Koi Pond" Sandwich Cake
Ann Marie	Rosemary Asiago Soda Bread	7th	Seafood Extravaganza
Devon	"Red Velvet" Loaf	8th	"My Big Fat Greek" Sandwich Cake
Megan	"Tipsy Tex-Mex" Bread	3rd	"Garden by the Sea" Sandwich Cake
Mengling	Hazelnut Chocolate Chunk Quick Bread	2nd	"Mall Sushi" Cake
Sachin	"Summer Picnic" Soda Bread	5th	Muffuletta Sandwich Cake
Sadiya	Sesame Coriander Naan	4th	"Memories of Bahrain" Sandwich Cake
Timothy	"Rise and Shine" Quick Bread	6th	"Rou Jia Mo" Sandwich Cake

=== Episode 4: International ===
For the Signature challenge, the bakers were given 2 hours to craft 24 hand pies. They could fashion and flavour the hand pies any way they wished, but they also had to accompany the pies with a complementary dipping sauce. In the Technical challenge, the bakers had 2 hours to craft 12 daifuku mochi, a traditional Japanese dessert consisting a glutinous rice cake stuffed with a strawberry encased in a sweetened red bean paste. For the Showstopper challenge, bakers had four hours to create a sculpture or diorama of at least two types of Italian cookies.

Baker	Signature (24 Hand pies)	Technical (12 Daifuku mochi)	Showstopper (Italian cookie sculpture)
Andrei	Mini Koulibiaka with Cucumber Relish	5th	"Fish in the Ocean" Scene
Devon	Bibimbap Hand Pies with Spicy Ketchup	6th	Southwest Cookie Scene
Megan	Hamburger Hand Pies with Special Sauce	1st	Northern Lights Scene
Mengling	Pork Xian Bing with Spicy Soy Dipping Sauce	7th	Beehive
Sachin	Pork & Pea Samosas with Mint Chutney	3rd	Egyptian Sphinx
Sadiya	Beef Fatayer with Tamarind Chutney	4th	Ludo Board
Timothy	Spring Roll Hand Pies with Sweet and Sour Sauce	2nd	"Waiting for the Bus" Cookie Scene

=== Episode 5: Pastry ===
For the Signature Challenge, the bakers were asked to make a fruit-filled slab pie: a shallow pie that is rectangular rather than round, baked in a rimmed baking sheet pan or jelly roll pan, in two hours and 15 minutes. The Technical Challenge gave them two hours and 15 minutes to create two dozen palmiers, 12 sweet and 12 savoury, using rough puff pastry. For the Showstopper Challenge, bakers had four and a half hours to produce a basket of 18 breakfast pastries—six croissants, six Danish, and six sweet buns.

Baker	Signature (Slab pie)	Technical (24 Palmiers)	Showstopper (Basket of breakfast pastries)
Andrei	"Strawberry Garden" Slab Pie	3rd	"Petit Déjeuner" Pastry Basket
Devon	"Dungeons & Dragons" Slab Pie	6th	"The Full Brunch" Pastry Basket
Megan	"Farm Views" Slab Pie	4th	"All Our Favourites" Pastry Basket
Mengling	"Three Dog Moon" Slab Pie	1st	Yuzu Strawberry Pastry Basket
Sachin	Apple Frangipane Slab Pie	2nd	"Christmas Morning" Pastry Basket
Timothy	"Tiny Dancer" Slab Pie	5th	"Happy Morning" Pastry Basket

=== Episode 6: Chocolate ===
In the quarterfinal Signature Challenge, the bakers were given two hours to create a tart with tempered chocolate decorations. The tart itself could be any shape or flavour as long as chocolate was the "star" ingredient. The uniquely time-sensitive nature of the Technical Challenge, one hour and 45 minutes to bake a chocolate soufflé, required that the bakers' starting times be staggered (in order - Mengling, Sachin, Timothy, Megan, Andrei) and the judges taste each soufflé fresh from the oven. Finally, the Showstopper Challenge required the bakers to create a modern re-imagining of the Black Forest cake.

Baker	Signature (Chocolate tart)	Technical (Soufflé)	Showstopper (Black Forest cake)
Andrei	"A Passion for Sailing" Chocolate Tart	2nd	"Winter Wonderland" Entremets
Megan	Exploding Chocolate Crunch Tart	1st	"Cherry on Top" Black Forest Cake
Mengling	Tea & Toffee Tart	3rd	Chocolate Miso Pink Cherry Cake
Sachin	"Ode to Lakshmi" Mocha Tart	4th	Marbled Black Forest Entremets
Timothy	Earl Grey & Lemon Chocolate Tart	5th	Black Forest St. Honoré

=== Episode 7: French Pâtisserie ===
The Pâtisserie Signature Challenge had the bakers make a mille crêpes cake: a cake built of at least 25 layered crêpes with a sweet filling between the layers, in two hours. For the Technical Challenge, they had two hours, 15 minutes to make 12 miniature jocondes, a cake of layered and filled almond sponge and mousse. The Showstopper gave them four hours to produce 36 savoury canapés: 12 with puff pastry, 12 tartlets, and 12 finger sandwiches.

Baker	Signature (Mille crêpes cake)	Technical (12 miniature joconde cakes)	Showstopper (36 Canapés)
Andrei	Coffee & Maple Mille Crêpes Cake	3rd	"Flavours of the World" Canapé Platter
Megan	Orange Crêpe-sicle Cake	1st	"World of Cheese" Canapés
Mengling	"Mont Blanc" Mille Crêpes Cake	4th	"Ingenious Flavours" Canapé Platter
Sachin	Blackberry & Raspberry Mille Crêpes Cake	2nd	"Memories of Childhood" Canapés

=== Episode 8: Finale ===
For the Signature challenge the finalists had two and a half hours to make 24 mini Swiss rolls, in two flavours. The Technical Challenge was to produce a Swedish Princess cake in two hours and 15 minutes. For the final showstopper, the bakers had to prepare a Choux pastry tower with at least three layers, and a minimum of two shapes of choux and three flavours of fillings, in four and a half hours; it was the hottest day of filming, handicapping the bakers in assembling their chocolate and cream towers.

Baker	Signature (24 Swiss rolls)	Technical (Princess cake)	Showstopper (Choux pastry tower)
Andrei	Mango Mascarpone and Opera Cake Swiss Rolls	2nd	Hommage à la Pâtisserie
Megan	Carrot Cake and Chocolate Strawberry Swiss Rolls	1st	Choux Owl
Sachin	Neapolitan and Lemon Ginger Swiss Rolls	3rd	Indian Wedding Choux Tower
