= The Great Canadian Baking Show season 3 =

Television cooking show

The Great Canadian Baking Show
- Season 3
- Starring: Carolyn Taylor; Aurora Browne; Bruno Feldeisen; Kyla Kennaley
- No. of episodes: 8

Release
- Original network: CBC Television
- Original release: September 18 – November 6, 2019

Season chronology
- ← Previous; Season 2 Next → The Great Canadian Holiday Baking Show

The third season of The Great Canadian Baking Show premiered on CBC Television on September 18, 2019. Ten amateur bakers competed over eight weeks of challenges, vying for the title. The season marked the debut of Carolyn Taylor and Aurora Browne, of the Baroness von Sketch Show, as hosts and chef Kyla Kennaley as judge. French-born Canadian chef and pastry expert Bruno Feldeisen returned as judge for a third season.

The winner of the season was Nataliia Shevchenko, with Colin Asuncion and Jodi Robson as runners-up.

== Bakers ==
Baker	Age	Profession	Hometown
Andrea Nauta	30	Barista	Comox, BC
Betty Chan	64	Retired executive assistant	Vancouver, BC
Chris Koo	30	Family physician	Edmonton, AB
Colin Asuncion	30	Marketing manager	Toronto, ON
Jasmine Linton	22	University student	Richmond Hill, ON
Jay Smidt	51	Government trade officer	Cantley, QC
Jodi Robson	33	Table games dealer	Regina, SK
Liam Harrap	30	Journalist	Revelstoke, BC
Mary Lou Snow	67	College physiotherapy instructor	Conception Bay South, NL
Nataliia Shevchenko	33	Administrative assistant	Edmonton, AB

== Results summary ==
Colour key:

Baker was one of the judges' least favourite bakers that week, but was not eliminated.
Baker was one of the judges' favourite bakers that week, but was not the Star Baker.
Baker got through to the next round.
Baker was eliminated.
Baker was the Star Baker.
Baker was a season runner-up.
Baker was the season winner.

Elimination chart
Baker	1	2	3	4	5	6	7	8
Nataliia	SB						SB	WINNER
Colin			SB					Runner Up
Jodi						SB		Runner Up
Chris					SB		OUT	
Jasmine				SB		OUT		
Liam					OUT			
Jay				OUT				
Andrea			OUT					
Mary Lou		OUT						
Betty	OUT							

== Episodes ==
Baker eliminated
Star Baker
Winner

=== Episode 1: Cake ===
For their first signature challenge, the bakers were given two hours to create a cake in the shape of a number that was of great significance to them, making sure that the story of their number shone through in the bake. For the technical challenge, the bakers were tasked with making a strawberry roulade with an Italian buttercream in one hour and thirty minutes. For the showstopper, the bakers had three hours to create a cake inspired by any one of Canada's ten provincial flags, whether the flag of their home province or elsewhere.

Baker	Signature (Number cake)	Technical (Strawberry roulade)	Showstopper (Provincial flag cake)
Andrea	Frolicking Mermaid Cake	6th	Sunshine Cookies & Cream Cake
Betty	Good Fortune Carrot Cake	10th	Provincial Genoise Cake
Chris	88 Keys Cake	8th	Slice of Alberta Cake
Colin	Boy Band Cake	9th	Ginger Molasses Cake
Jasmine	(Un)Lucky Thirteen Cake	2nd	Ode to Maligne Lake Cake
Jay	Caramel Banana Rugby Cake	1st	Sugar Shack Cake
Jodi	Four Season Cake	4th	Prairie Summer Cake
Liam	Outdoor Adventure Cake	7th	Sunrise Over The Ocean Cake
Mary Lou	Chocolate Birthday Cake	5th	Iceberg Alley Cake
Nataliia	Ukrainian Honey Cake	3rd	Ukraine in Alberta Cake

=== Episode 2: Biscuits ===
The signature bake required the making of 36 identical savoury crackers, with a complimentary spread, in 90 minutes. In the technical challenge, Kyla asked the bakers to make a dozen marshmallow puff cookies, in one hour and 20 minutes. For the showstopper they were asked to create a fantasy scene made out of cookies, using at least two different types of cookie dough, in four hours.

Baker	Signature (36 Savoury crackers and dip)	Technical (12 Marshmallow puffs)	Showstopper (Cookie fantasy)
Andrea	Magical Butterfly Crackers	3rd	Magical Fairy Garden
Chris	Japanese Tea Ceremony Biscuits	1st	Dragon Boss Biscuit Battle
Colin	Cinco de Mayo Crackers	5th	Land of the Mer-People
Jasmine	Jamaican Jerk Crackers	8th	Super Jasmine Saves the City
Jay	Rustic Scandi Crackers	2nd	Dog Sanctuary
Jodi	Pretty in Pink Daisy Crackers	7th	Dragon Hoarding Treasure
Liam	Parsnip Patch Crackers	9th	Is Anybody Gnome?
Mary Lou	A Taste of Home Mustard Crackers	6th	Newfoundland Ghost Ship
Nataliia	Beet & Dill Crispy Twists	4th	Galactic Metropolis

=== Episode 3: Bread ===
For the signature challenge, the bakers were asked to make a povitica in two and a half hours; while maintaining its distinctive folds and swirly interior, the bakers were allowed to size, shape and flavour the loaf however they wanted. For the technical challenge, the bakers had to make twelve hand-kneaded brioche à tête, with a chocolate interior, in two hours forty-five minutes. The showstopper challenge featured the bakers creating a bread sculpture, with at least two types of yeast-leavened bread, in four and a half hours.

Baker	Signature (Povitica)	Technical (12 Brioche à tête)	Showstopper (Bread sculpture)
Andrea	Mocha Coco Loco Povitica	5th	Bouquet of Bread
Chris	Chinese Roots Povitica	4th	Mythological Mermaid
Colin	Chai Spice Povitica	1st	Constellation Challah
Jasmine	Spumoni Povitica	7th	Panda-Monium
Jay	Black Forest Povitica	6th	Butterfly Bread
Jodi	Chocolate Raspberry Povitica	3rd	Pretzel-Mania
Liam	Savoury Ethiophian Berbere Povitica	8th	Birdcage of Bread
Nataliia	Hazelnut & Mango Povitica	2nd	Ukra-nadian Girl

=== Episode 4: Old School ===
For the signature challenge, the bakers had to make a coffee cake with a complementary streusel topping in ninety minutes. For the technical challenge, the bakers were given one hour fifteen minutes to make six crème caramel desserts. The showstopper challenge had the bakers make a slab cake to celebrate any occasion of their choosing in three and a half hours; the cake also had to have a well-piped inspirational message on top.

Baker	Signature (Coffee Cake)	Technical (6 Crème caramel)	Showstopper (Celebration Slab Cake)
Chris	"Chai Spice" Coffee Cake	2nd	"We Did It" Slab Cake
Colin	"Morning Glory" Coffee Cake	1st	"Next Adventure" Slab Cake
Jasmine	"Sweet Peach" Coffee Cake	3rd	"Toast to the Class" Slab Cake
Jay	"Memphis" Coffee Cake	6th	"Rainbow Pride" Slab Cake
Jodi	Spring Harvest Coffee Cake	4th	"Sweetheart" Slab Cake
Liam	"Pear Shaped" Coffee Cake	5th	"Good Luck Grace" Slab Cake
Nataliia	Summer Orchard Coffee Cake	7th	"Happy Birthday" Spinach Slab Cake

=== Episode 5: Chocolate ===
For the signature challenge, the bakers had two hours to produce 24 chocolate sandwich cookies, with a filling of their choice that also had to feature chocolate as a primary flavour. This week's technical required the bakers to create a marquise de chocolat in two hours. The bakers' showstopper challenge was to create a box of eighteen chocolates of three different kinds. along with a solid chocolate centrepiece - all tied together in a common theme - in three and a half hours.

Baker	Signature (24 Chocolate sandwich cookies)	Technical (Marquise au chocolat)	Showstopper (Box of chocolate)
Chris	Chocolate Dacquoise Treats	1st	Memories of Singapore Chocolate Box
Colin	Chocolate Pomegranate Hearts	2nd	Spooky Halloween Chocolate Box
Jasmine	Wine & Roses Chocolate Cookies	3rd	Honey Bee Chocolate Box
Jodi	Chocolate Churro Cookies	5th	Hawaiian Dreams Chocolate Box
Liam	Homey Peanut Butter Cookies	6th	Falling Leaves Marzipan Chocolate Box
Nataliia	Dulce de Leche Chocolate Walnut Cookies	4th	Weekend Getaway Chocolate Box

=== Episode 6: International ===
The signature bake asked the competitors to produce a Pastel de tres leches, a Latin American style sponge cake soaked in a milk mixture, in three hours. The technical challenges gave them 90 minutes to make a Kransekake, a Norwegian or Danish cone-shape tower of almond cookie rings held together with royal icing, traditionally eaten on special occasions. The showstopper challenge was to bake and decorate an internationally inspired cheesecake in four hours.

Baker	Signature (Pastel de tres leches)	Technical (Kransekake)	Showstopper (Cheesecake)
Chris	Yin and Yang Tres Leches	2nd	Strawberry Mojito Soufflé Cheesecake
Colin	Coconut Ube Tres Leches	3rd	Cassava and Cheddar Cheesecake
Jasmine	Ponche-de-Creme Tres Leches	5th	Altar to Demeter Greek Cheesecakes
Jodi	Creamy Caramel Coffee Tres Leches	1st	Tropical Celebration Cassata
Nataliia	Coffee Walnut Crunch Tres Leches	4th	Fruit Explosion Zapekanka

=== Episode 7: Pie ===
The semi-finals signature bake asked the contestants to make a pie with a recognizable face on it, using any pastry and filling, sweet or savoury, in two-and-a-half hours. The technical challenge gave them 2 hours and 15 minutes to make a pithivier, a puff pastry tart, filled with frangipane and sour cherry jam. The showstopper challenge was to bake a themed tower of at least three pies and/or tarts in four hours.

Baker	Signature (Pastry Pie Face)	Technical (Pithivier)	Showstopper (Tiered Pie Tower)
Chris	Howling Wolf Savoury Pie	4th	Pies of Alsace
Colin	Savoury Medusa Pie	1st	Family Cottage Favourites Pie Tower
Jodi	Black Bear-y Cheesecake Pie	3rd	Brunchuppert Pie Tower
Nataliia	Face in the Mirror Pie	2nd	Euro Dinner Pie Tower

=== Episode 8: Finale ===
For the Signature challenge the finalists had three hours to make a fraisier cake, a French strawberry cake with both mousse and sponge. The Technical Challenge was to produce a marjolaine, a dessert cake combining almond and hazelnut meringue layers with French buttercream, chocolate ganache, and candied hazelnuts, in two and a half hours. For the final showstopper, the bakers had to prepare a pièce montée centrepiece incorporating choux pastry, cake, icing and cookies, in the shape of a recognizable landmark, in four and a half hours.

Baker	Signature (Fraisier cake)	Technical (Marjolaine)	Showstopper (Pièce montée)
Colin	French Toast Fraisier	2nd	"Top of the Tower" Pièce Montée
Jodi	Strawberry "Chocaholic" Fraisier	3rd	"City of Love" Pièce Montée
Nataliia	Matcha Madness Fraisier	1st	Motherland Monument Pièce Montée
