= The Great Canadian Baking Show =

Canadian television series

- Genre: Reality television; Baking competition
- Presented by: Dan Levy; Julia Chan; Aurora Browne; Carolyn Taylor; Alan Shane Lewis; Ann Pornel
- Judges: Bruno Feldeisen; Rochelle Adonis; Kyla Kennaley
- Narrated by: Julia Chan; Aurora Browne; Carolyn Taylor; Ann Pornel; Alan Shane Lewis
- Country of origin: Canada
- Original language: English
- No. of seasons: 9
- No. of episodes: 51 (including specials)

Production
- Executive producer: Cathie James
- Producers: Marike Emery; Mark Van de Ven
- Production companies: Proper Television; Love Productions

Original release
- Network: CBC Television
- Release: November 1, 2017 – present

Related
- Raufikat's Better Bake Along (CBC Gem)

The Great Canadian Baking Show is a Canadian cooking competition television series that premiered on CBC Television on November 1, 2017. It is an adaptation of the British television series The Great British Bake Off, which airs in Canada under the title The Great British Baking Show.

For its first two seasons, the show was hosted by Dan Levy and Julia Chan, with French-born Canadian chef Bruno Feldeisen and Canadian-Australian pastry chef Rochelle Adonis as judges. The third season was hosted by Aurora Browne and Carolyn Taylor, comedians and actors of Baroness von Sketch Show fame, with Feldeisen returning as a judge joined by Canadian chef Kyla Kennaley. From the fourth season onward, it has been hosted by comedians and Second City alumni Ann Pornel and Alan Shane Lewis.

== Premise ==
Each season of the show features 10 amateur baking contestants selected from across Canada to participate in a competition of themed baking challenges. Adapted from The Great British Bake Off, each episode features three rounds: the Signature Bake, the Technical Challenge, and the Showstopper. After the two judges taste and critique the entries, they determine which contestant is crowned each week's "Star Baker" and which contestant will be sent home.

In each season finale, the final three bakers compete to be named the winner of The Great Canadian Baking Show and take home the GCBS cake stand.

== Production ==
Produced by Proper Television in association with the CBC and Love Productions, the show is filmed on the grounds of the Canadian Film Centre in Toronto during mid-summer, then premiered in November for season 1, and September for seasons 2 and 3, on CBC. The executive producer is Cathie James, and the series producers are Marike Emery (seasons 1 through 4) and Mark Ven de Ven (season 5).

Levy, a self-proclaimed "huge fan" of the British series upon which the show is based, stated that he "actively pursued" the hosting role for the premiere season.

CBC Television announced on February 7, 2018 that the series was renewed for a second season, and all hosts and judges would be returning. The series was renewed for a third season in 2019 with judge Bruno Feldeisen being joined by new judge Kyla Kennaley and new hosts Aurora Browne and Carolyn Taylor. The series was renewed for a fourth season due to air in 2020, but due to the COVID-19 pandemic, production was delayed and the season aired in early 2021, with new hosts Alan Shane Lewis and Ann Pornel. The fifth season aired in 2021 with the same hosts and judges.

== Hosts and judges ==
Hosts/Judges	Season													
Hosts/Judges	1	2	3	Holiday	4	5	Holiday	6	Holiday	7	Holiday	8	9	10
Current
Bruno Feldeisen	Judge													
Kyla Kennaley			Judge											
Alan Shane Lewis					Host									
Ann Pornel					Host									
Former
Dan Levy	Host													
Julia Chan	Host													
Rochelle Adonis	Judge													
Aurora Browne			Host											
Carolyn Taylor			Host											

== Reception ==
John Doyle, reviewing the first episode for The Globe and Mail, called the show boring and said that it lacked "the major ingredients of eccentric flair and idiosyncratic contestants [of the original]." Doyle's criticism of host Dan Levy's "feyness" in the review was called homophobic by Levy and others. Eater Montreal writer Tim Forster said the show's first episode is "like somebody left the sugar out of the recipe: it looks right, but the flavour is kind of bland" due to a lack of focus on the contestants' stories, which he primarily attributed to poor editing and a rushed pace due to a shorter running time than the British series. Joanna Schneller called the judging by Bruno Feldeisen and Rochelle Adonis "consistently dull" in a review of the second episode for the Toronto Star. She suggested that, like the judges in the original series, they should be instructing on the significance of dishes as well as judging.

Greg David of TV, eh? called the show "unapologetically entertaining" and "a calming oasis amid the noisy negativity we're besieged with," specifically praising the chemistry of hosts Levy and Chan. Katherine DeClerq, reviewing the final episode in Women's Post, said she was "pleasantly surprised" by the series and "while the dry humour could be a bit dryer and the puns slightly less cheesy, I have to say I am in love with The Great Canadian Baking Show."

== Season overview ==
Season	Episodes	Premiere	Finale	Runners-up	Winner	Average viewers (millions)
1	8	November 1, 2017	December 20, 2017	Linda Longson	Sabrina Degni	1.4
1	8	November 1, 2017	December 20, 2017	Vandana Jain	Sabrina Degni	1.4
2	8	September 19, 2018	November 17, 2018	Sachin Seth	Andrei Godoroja	1.4
2	8	September 19, 2018	November 17, 2018	Megan Stasiewich	Andrei Godoroja	1.4
3	8	September 18, 2019	November 6, 2019	Colin Asuncion	Nataliia Shevchenko	1.2
3	8	September 18, 2019	November 6, 2019	Jodi Robson	Nataliia Shevchenko	1.2
Holiday (2019)	1	November 13, 2019		James Hoyland	Timothy Fu	
Holiday (2019)	1	November 13, 2019		Megan Stasiewich	Timothy Fu	
Holiday (2019)	1	November 13, 2019		Vandana Jain	Timothy Fu	
4	8	February 14, 2021	April 4, 2021	Tanner Davies	Raufikat Oyawoye	
4	8	February 14, 2021	April 4, 2021	Mahathi Mundluru	Raufikat Oyawoye	
5	8	October 17, 2021	December 5, 2021	Aimee DeCruyenaere	Vincent Chan	
5	8	October 17, 2021	December 5, 2021	Steve Levitt	Vincent Chan	
Holiday (2021)	1	December 12, 2021		Jodi Robson	Sachin Seth	
Holiday (2021)	1	December 12, 2021		Linda Longson	Sachin Seth	
Holiday (2021)	1	December 12, 2021		Colin Asuncion	Sachin Seth	
6	8	October 2, 2022	November 20, 2022	Chi Nguyễn	Lauren Tjoe	
6	8	October 2, 2022	November 20, 2022	Zoya Thawer	Lauren Tjoe	
Holiday (2022)	1	November 27, 2022		Mengling Chen	Mahathi Mundluru	
Holiday (2022)	1	November 27, 2022		Stephen Nhan	Mahathi Mundluru	
Holiday (2022)	1	November 27, 2022		Steve Levitt	Mahathi Mundluru	
7	8	October 1, 2023	November 19, 2023	Camila García Hernández	Loïc Fauteux-Goulet	
7	8	October 1, 2023	November 19, 2023	Candice Riley	Loïc Fauteux-Goulet	
Holiday (2023)	1	November 26, 2023		Nataliia Shevchenko	Andrei Godoroja	
Holiday (2023)	1	November 26, 2023		Raufikat Oyawoye	Andrei Godoroja	
Holiday (2023)	1	November 26, 2023		Vincent Chan	Andrei Godoroja	
8	8	October 6, 2024	November 24, 2024	Jen Childs	Elora Khanom	
8	8	October 6, 2024	November 24, 2024	Pamela Kramer	Elora Khanom	
9	8	October 5, 2025	November 23, 2025	Zoë Weinrebe	Jo Mandet	
9	8	October 5, 2025	November 23, 2025	Ryan Gridzak	Jo Mandet	
10	8	October 4, 2026		TBA	TBA	
10	8	October 4, 2026		TBA	TBA	

=== Season 1 (2017) ===
The inaugural season featured 10 bakers from across Canada competing over eight weeks. The season was won by Sabrina Degni of Montreal, Quebec. Runners-up were Vandana Jain (Regina, Saskatchewan) and Linda Longson (High River, Alberta).

=== Season 2 (2018) ===
Auditions for the second season were announced by CBC Television on February 7, 2018. The season began airing on September 19, 2018. The season was won by Andrei Godoroja of Vancouver, British Columbia. Runners-up were Sachin Seth (Halifax, Nova Scotia) and Megan Stasiewich (Leduc, Alberta).

=== Season 3 (2019) ===
Auditions for the third season were announced on January 24, 2019 with a release date of September 18, 2019. The winner of the season was Nataliia Shevchenko of Edmonton, Alberta. Runners-up were Colin Asuncion (Toronto, Ontario) and Jodi Robson (Regina, Saskatchewan).

=== The Great Canadian Holiday Baking Show (2019) ===
CBC announced a holiday special episode of The Great Canadian Baking Show on October 30, 2019 featuring four bakers from the competition's first two seasons: Season 1's Vandana Jain and James Hoyland alongside Season 2's Megan Stasiewich and Timothy Fu.

=== Season 4 (Winter 2021) ===
CBC announced auditions for the fourth season on April 17, 2020. Due to the ongoing COVID-19 pandemic, production (and thus the show's premiere) was delayed; as a result, the fourth season premiered on February 14, 2021. The season winner was Raufikat Oyawoye of Milton, Ontario. The runners-up were Tanner Davies (Winnipeg, Manitoba) and Mahathi Mundluru (Markham, Ontario).

=== Season 5 (Fall 2021) ===
On February 26, 2021, while Season 4 was still in progress, CBC announced auditions for the fifth season. Filming took place in June and July 2021, with the season premiering on October 17, 2021. The season winner was Vincent Chan of Mississauga, Ontario. Runners-up were Aimee DeCruyenaere (Ottawa, Ontario) and Steve Levitt (Aurora, Ontario).

=== The Great Canadian Holiday Baking Show (2021) ===
CBC announced a second holiday special episode of The Great Canadian Baking Show on November 18, 2021 featuring four bakers from the competition's previous seasons: Season 1's Linda Longson, Season 2's Sachin Seth, and Season 3's Colin Asuncion and Jodi Robson.

=== Season 6 (2022) ===
CBC announced auditions for the sixth season on January 21, 2022. The sixth season premiered on CBC Television on October 2, 2022. The season winner was Lauren Tjoe of Tsawwassen, British Columbia, with Chi Nguyễn (Toronto, Ontario) and Zoya Thawer (Edmonton, Alberta) as runners-up.

=== The Great Canadian Holiday Baking Show (2022) ===
CBC announced a third holiday special episode of The Great Canadian Baking Show on November 16, 2022 featuring four bakers from the competition's previous seasons: Season 2's Mengling Chen, Season 4's Mahathi Mundluru, and Season 5's Stephen Nhan and Steve Levitt.

=== Season 7 (2023) ===
CBC announced auditions for the seventh season on January 23, 2023. Auditions were held in-person at select cities and virtually. The seventh season premiered on CBC Television on October 1, 2023. The season winner was Loïc Fauteux-Goulet of Creston, British Columbia, with Camila García Hernández (Toronto, Ontario) and Candice Riley (Brampton, Ontario) as runners-up.

=== The Great Canadian Holiday Baking Show (2023) ===
CBC announced a fourth holiday special episode of The Great Canadian Baking Show on November 14, 2023 featuring four winners from the competition's previous seasons: Season 2's Andrei Godoroja, Season 3's Nataliia Shevchenko, Season 4's Raufikat Oyawoye, and Season 5's Vincent Chan. The episode aired on November 26, 2023.

=== Season 8 (2024) ===
CBC announced auditions for the eighth season on February 6, 2024, with both virtual and in-person auditions held in select cities. The eighth season premiered on CBC on October 6, 2024. The season winner was Elora Khanom of Edmonton, Alberta, with Jen Childs (Esquimalt, British Columbia) and Pamela Kramer (Stayner, Ontario) as runners-up.

=== Season 9 (2025) ===
Auditions for a ninth season were announced by CBC on January 8, 2025, with virtual and in-person auditions held in Toronto, Saskatoon, Vancouver, and St. John's. The ninth season premiered on CBC on October 5, 2025. The season was won by Jo Mandet of Vancouver, British Columbia, with Ryan Gridzak (Sault Ste. Marie, Ontario) and Zoë Weinrebe (Toronto, Ontario) as runners-up.

=== Season 10 (2026) ===
CBC announced auditions for a tenth season on November 21, 2025, with casting via virtual and in-person auditions held in Toronto, Montreal, Winnipeg, Charlottetown, Edmonton, and Moncton. The tenth season premiered on CBC on October 4, 2026.
