= Pouding chômeur =

Québécois dessert

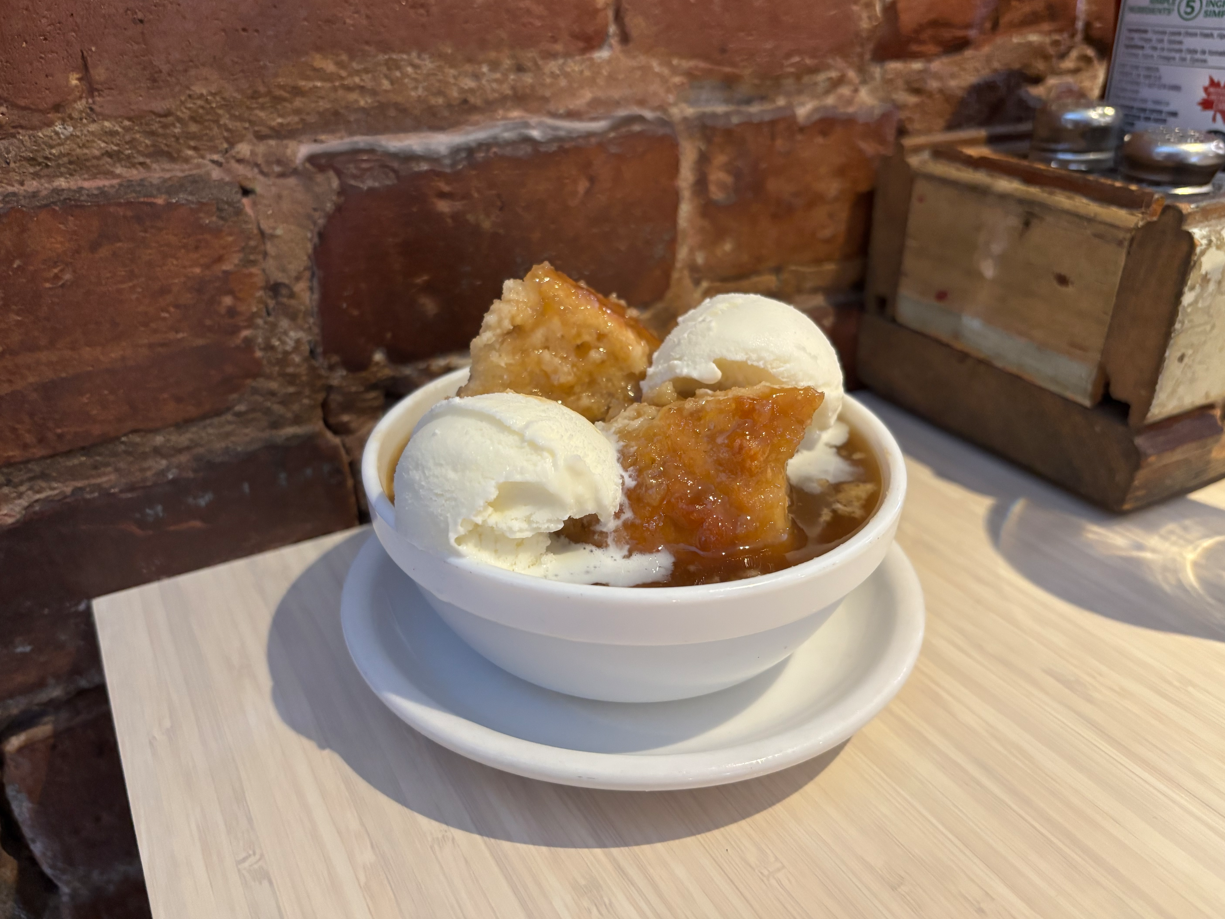
- Course: Dessert
- Place of origin: Canada
- Region or state: Quebec
- Serving temperature: Cold or warm
- Main ingredients: Maple syrup, Eggs, Flour, Butter, Cream

Pouding chômeur ("unemployed man's pudding", often translated idiomatically as "poor man's pudding") is a dessert that was created during the early years of the Great Depression in Quebec, Canada. It typically involves a bread pudding covered in a mixture with a syrup, usually maple syrup and cream. Today, it is casually served as a regional dessert, perhaps being a bit more popular during the saison des sucres, when maple sap is collected and processed and is usually part of the offerings during a meal at a sugar shack, but it is not specifically a maple dessert.

In Australia, New Zealand, and parts of the United Kingdom, a similar dessert known as "self saucing pudding" (or often just called pudding) exists, although it is now more commonly sold in baking mix packages alongside other cakes, rather than being prepared at home.

== Description ==
The pouding chômeur is a basic cake batter onto which a hot syrup, typically maple or caramel is poured before baking. The cake then rises through the liquid which settles at the bottom of the pan, mixing with the batter and creating a distinct layer at the bottom of the dish. The syrup or caramel can be made from brown sugar, white sugar, maple syrup or a combination of these.

During the worst of the Depression, stale bread was used in lieu of cake batter.

== Linguistic variations ==
The dessert is also sometimes called pouding du chômeur or pouding au chômeur and is sometimes written using the formal English word pudding.

== See also ==
- Cuisine of Quebec
- Galaktoboureko
- Bread pudding
