= Flapper pie =

Dessert in Canadian cuisine

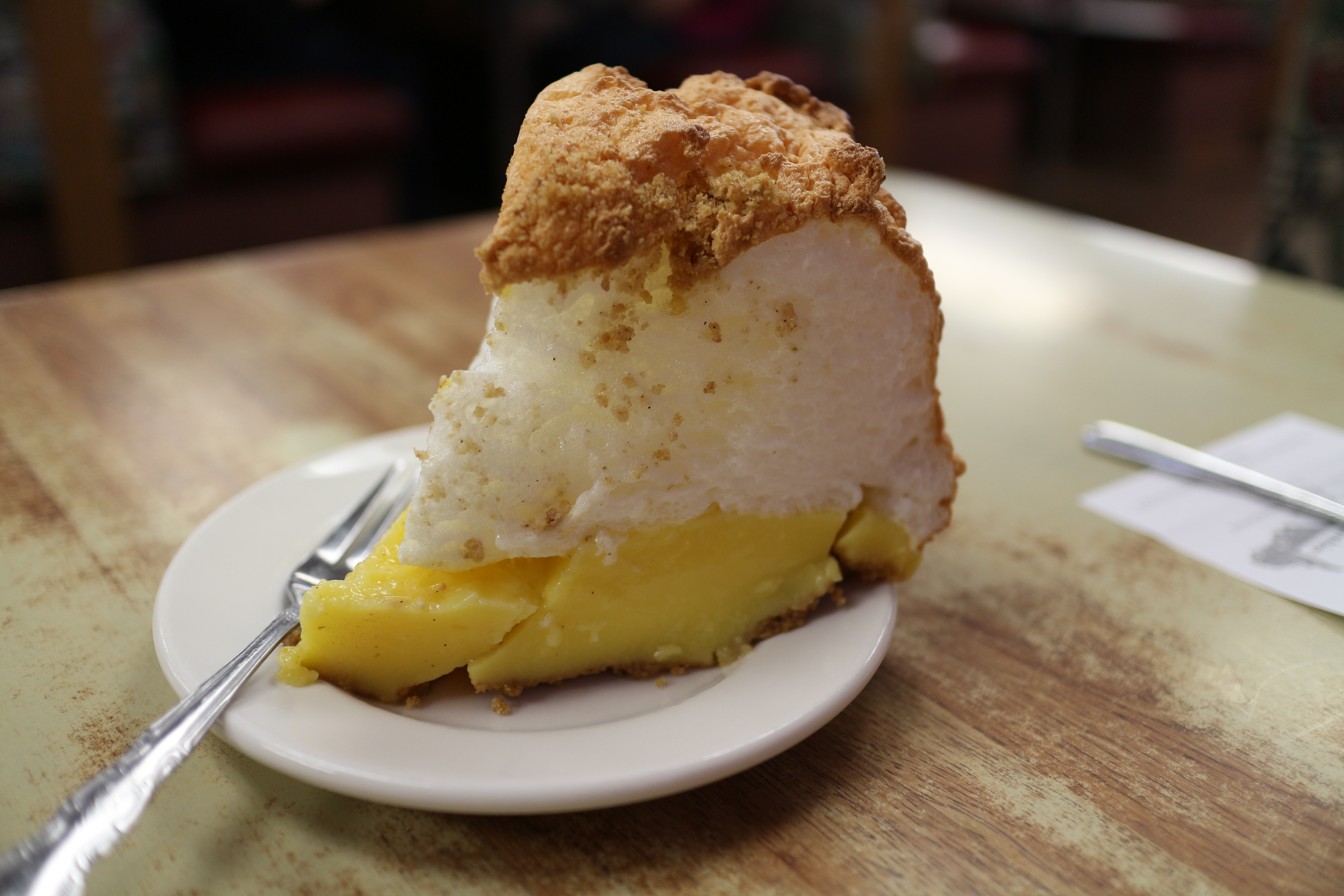
- Type: Custard pie
- Place of origin: Canada
- Main ingredients: Graham cracker, custard, meringue

Flapper pie, or the forgotten Prairie pie, is a vanilla custard pie topped with meringue (or sometimes whipped cream in Southern Saskatchewan) within a graham cracker crust.

The pie is a staple of the Canadian prairie culture. At the Salisbury House chain of restaurants in Winnipeg, it is sold as "wafer pie".

== Additional ingredients ==
Whiskey, peach leaves, lemon peel, or vanilla may be added to the custard filling of flapper pie.

== History ==
The exact origin of flapper pie is unknown. However, flapper pie became popular across the Canadian Prairies during the 1920s, with the dessert earning its name from flappers. Flapper pie continued to be made during the Depression era due to the recipe only needing simple ingredients. By the 1940s, the pie had faded into obscurity and become "forgotten."

== See also ==
- List of custard desserts
- List of pies, tarts and flans
