= Mhancha =

Algero-Ottoman pastry

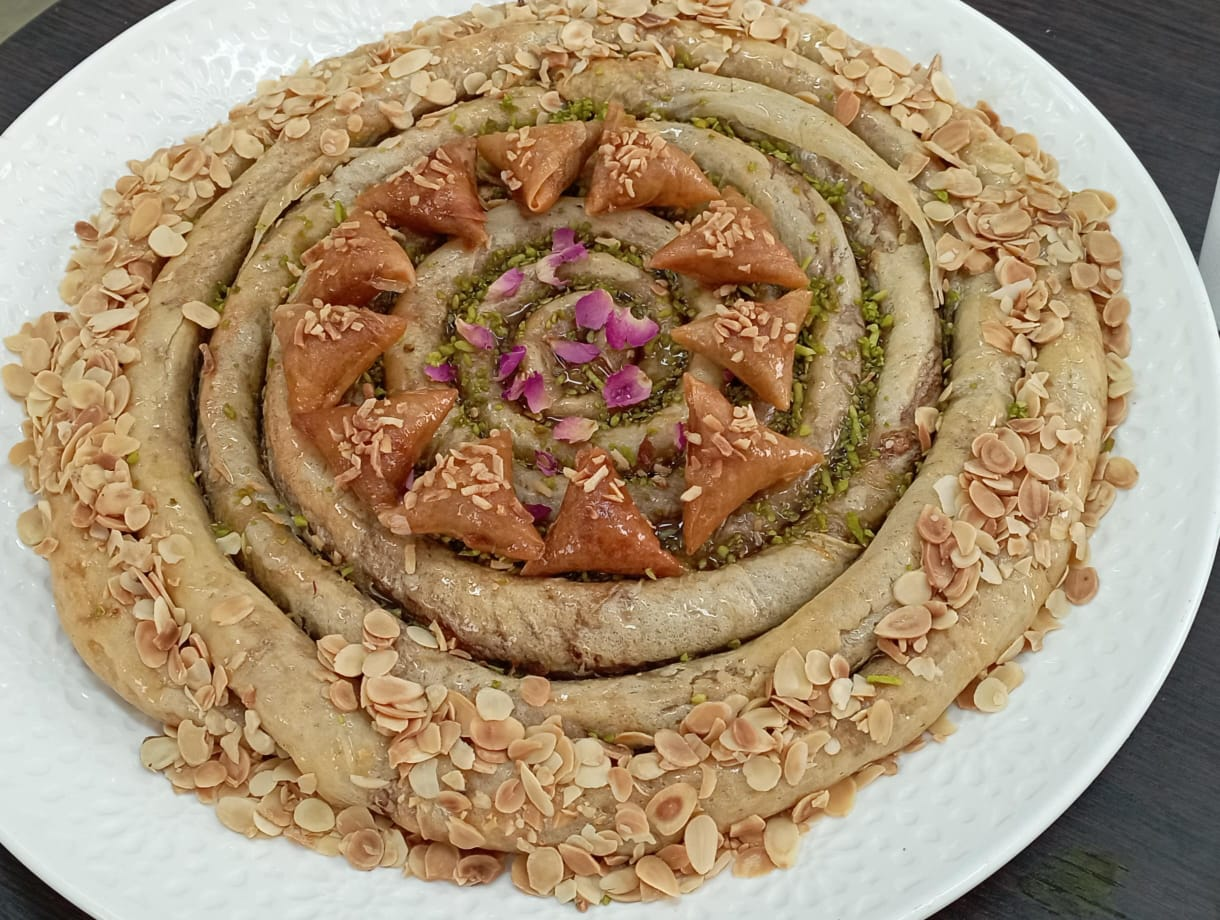
- Course: Pastry; dessert
- Place of origin: North Africa
- Region or state: Maghreb

Mhancha is a sweet coiled "serpentine" pastry made using phyllo dough and almonds.

Mhancha is made using ground almonds or an almond paste or even walnuts. It is made using thin sheets of phyllo dough pastry and is arranged in a spiral, hence its name. It is either fried or baked.
