= Ants on a log =

Celery-based snack using raisins

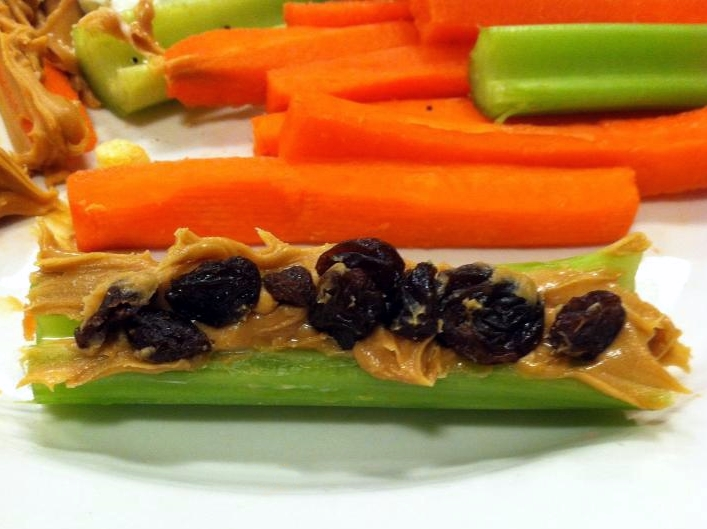
Ants on a log made with peanut butter

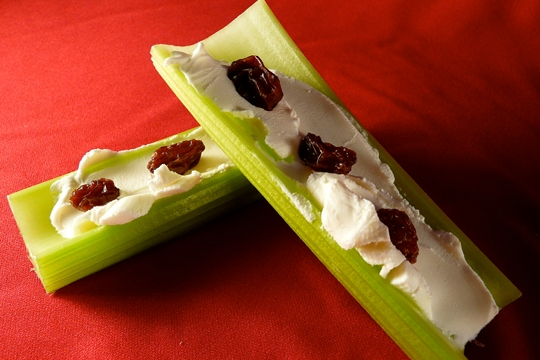
Ants on a "snowy" log made using cream cheese

Ants on a log is a North American snack made by spreading peanut butter, cream cheese, ricotta cheese, or another spread on celery, pretzels or bananas and placing raisins, blueberries, or chocolate chips, etc. on top. The snack and its name are presumed to originate in the 1950s. The classic peanut butter version of ants on a log is recommended as a healthy snack by the McKinley Health Center at the University of Illinois at Urbana-Champaign.

== Origins ==
Stuffed celery became a popular snack in the early 1900s after the inclusion of such recipes as Celery with Roquefort in the book Catering for Special Occasions with Menus and Recipes by Fannie Merritt Farmer. Celery was most commonly stuffed with a form of cheese, the most popular being cream cheese, and was often topped with capers or olives. The inventor of the peanut butter/raisin combination of the snack is unknown. However, many attribute the popularization of the combination to the Girl Scouts, where the recipe has been featured in several iterations of the Girl Scout Cookbook as far back as 1946, although at that time the recipe was titled "Celery Sticks" and did not include raisins. The first time the "Ants on a Log" snack was mentioned in print was in an article published by the Star Tribune on February 15, 1959, which reads, "Anne Marie is working on snacks. Popcorn, cheese dips, and the other night, ants on a log have been some of the foods the family has shared.”

== Variants ==
There are numerous variations of ants on a log, including:

- Gnats on a log: currants
- Ants on vacation: without "ants" (raisins)
- Ants on a Slip 'n Slide: add honey on top of the peanut butter before adding raisins
- Ants on a canoe: substitute apple slices for traditional celery
- Pigs in a pen: substitute pimento cheese for peanut butter and replace "ants" (raisins) with bacon bits (pigs)
- Ants on a ranch: substitute ranch dressing for peanut butter and peas for raisins
- Fish on a stream: Hummus spread on a celery stalk and topped with Goldfish crackers

== See also ==
- List of peanut dishes
- List of vegetable dishes
