= Rochelle Adonis =

Australian pastry chef, restaurateur, and television personality

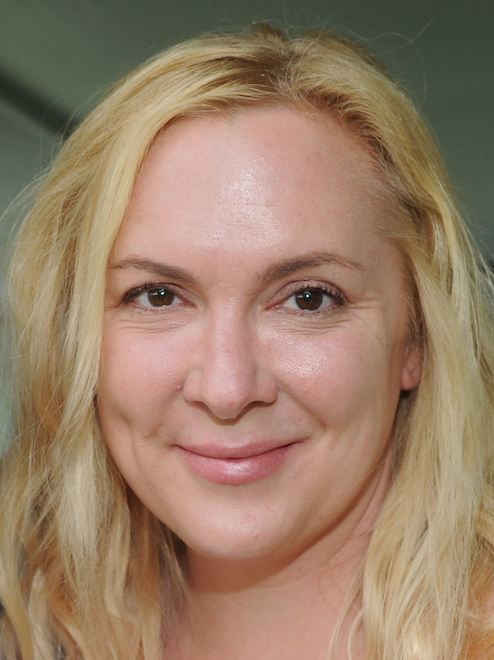
- Adonis at the 2018 Canadian Film Centre Garden Party
- Born: April 2, 1972 (age 54); Montreal, Quebec, Canada
- Culinary career
- Ratings: Michelin stars; AAA Motor Club; Mobil; Good Food Guide
- Current restaurant(s): Rochelle Adonis Cakes + Confections, Highgate, Western Australia
- Television show: The Great Canadian Baking Show (2017-18)

Rochelle Adonis is a Canadian Australian pastry chef, restaurateur, and television personality. She appeared as a celebrity judge on the first two seasons of The Great Canadian Baking Show alongside French-born Canadian chef Bruno Feldeisen.

== Early life and travel ==
Adonis was born and raised in Montreal, Quebec. She moved to Sydney at the age of ten, where she later studied to be a chef. Having worked extensively in pastry kitchens across Europe, including the Hotel Sacher in Vienna, Adonis returned to Australia in 1998, assuming senior pastry positions in several of Sydney's finest dining establishments. Adonis moved to Perth in 2001 and sold wedding cakes and taught cooking classes.

== Career ==
Adonis founded her eponymous brand in 2007, delivering cakes, handmade confections, and her own take on the traditional high tea dining experience in Perth, Western Australia. In 2008, Adonis opened her first exclusive studio. Adonis relocated her flagship business in 2013 to Highgate, a northern suburb of Perth, after outgrowing her original studio.

=== Television chef ===
Adonis was a judge on the first two seasons of The Great Canadian Baking Show (a Canadian adaptation of The Great British Bake Off), produced for the CBC Television network from 2017 to 2018.
