= Prinjolata =

Traditional dessert from Malta

- Course: dessert
- Place of origin: Malta
- Main ingredients: Sponge cake, Filling: Whisky/Vermouth, pine nuts, glacé cherries, cocoa nibs, butter, sugar, vanilla, Topping: whipping cream, glacé cherries, flaked almonds, chocolate

Prinjolata is a traditional dessert from Malta. The dessert gets its name from the Maltese word prinjol meaning pine nuts which are used in both the filling and the topping.

== Cultural significance ==
Prinjolata is generally prepared as a treat to be eaten at the Maltese Carnival; a festival introduced to Malta in the 1400s, and popularised by the Knights of St John a century later. In Malta, Carnival is held five days before Ash Wednesday.
