= Battenberg cake =

British sponge cake

Battenberg Cake
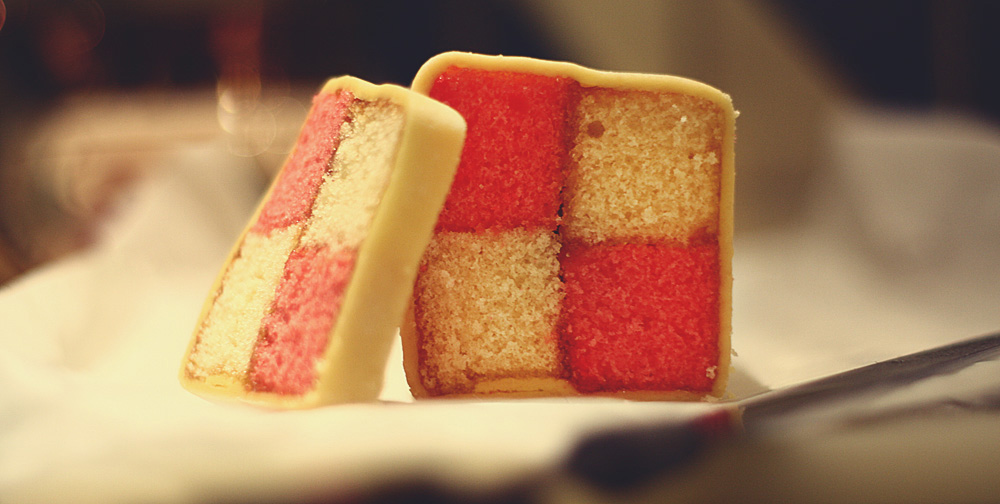
- A homemade Battenberg cake with typical chequered pink-and-yellow squares
- Type: Sponge cake
- Place of origin: England
- Created by: Unknown
- Main ingredients: Flour, jam, marzipan

Battenberg or Battenburg cake is a light sponge cake with coloured sections held together with jam and covered in marzipan. In cross section, the cake has a distinctive pink-and-yellow check pattern. It originated in England.

The chequered patterns on many emergency vehicles' liveries are officially referred to as Battenburg markings because of their resemblance to the cake.

== Recipe ==
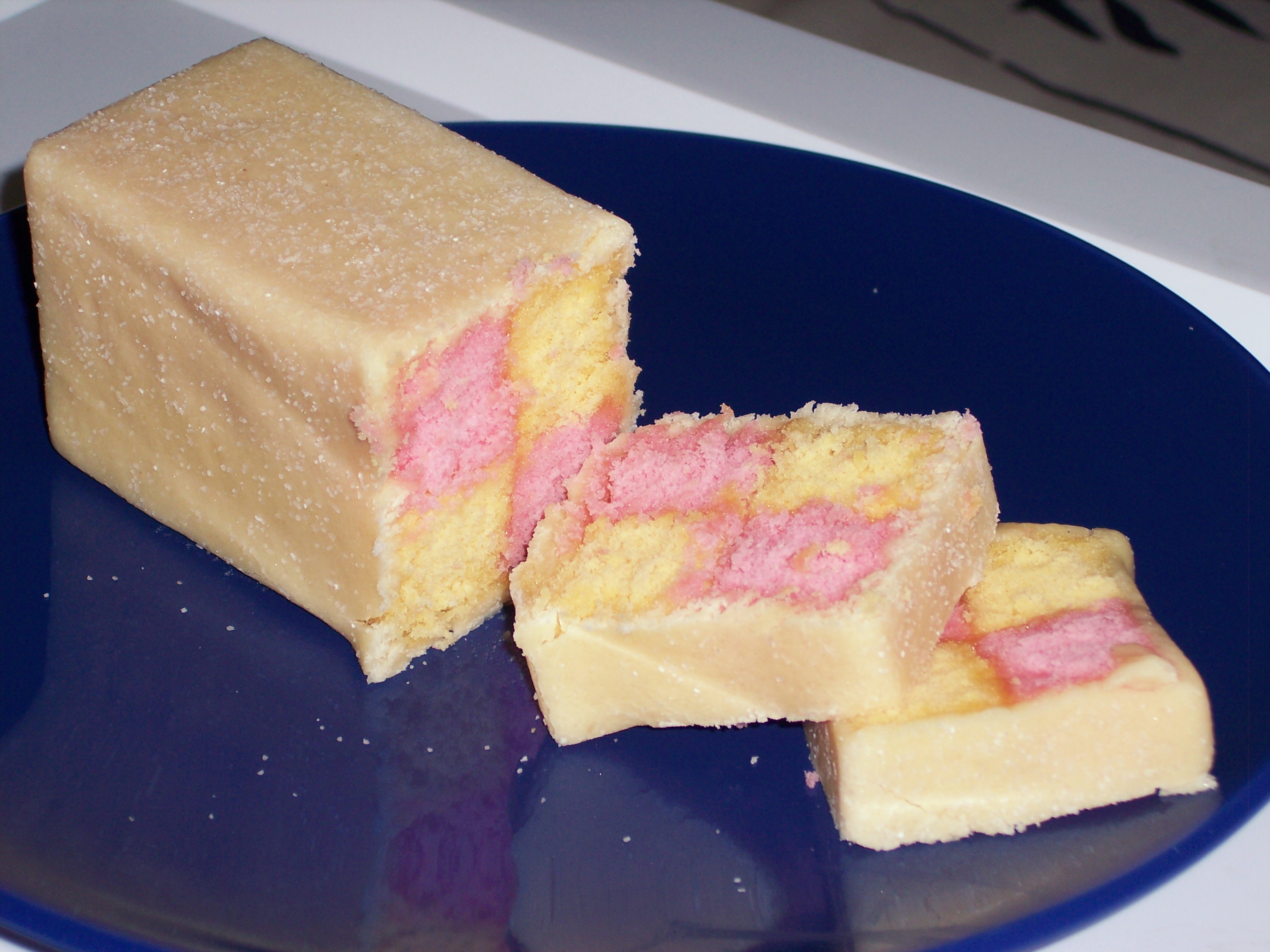
Battenberg cake by British food manufacturer Lyons

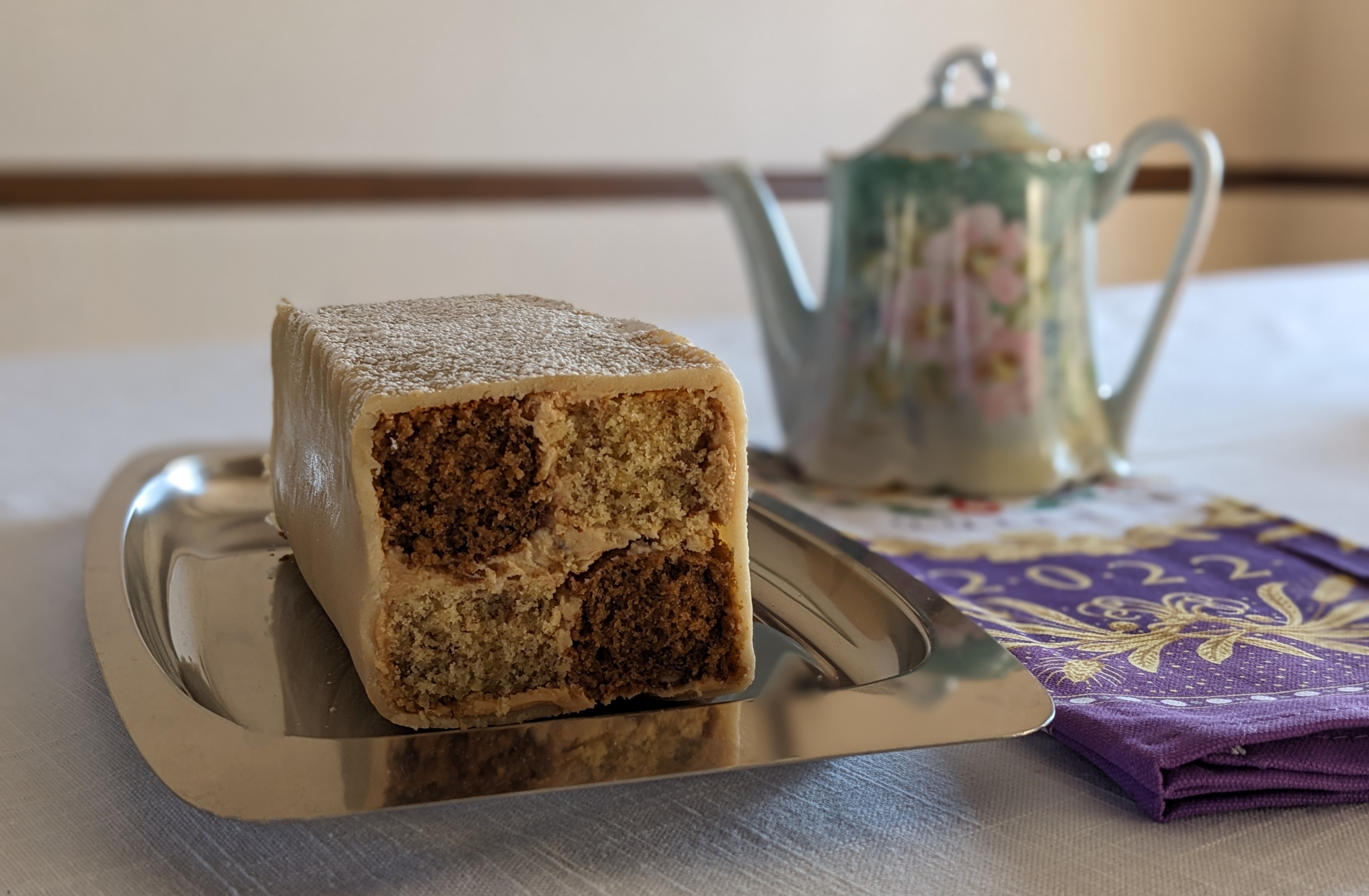
A coffee and walnut Battenberg with tea

Battenberg cakes are constructed by baking yellow and pink almond sponge-cakes separately, then cutting and combining the pieces in a chequered pattern. The cake is held together by jam and covered with marzipan.

== Origins ==
While the cake originates in England, its exact origins are unclear, with early recipes also using the alternative names "Domino Cake" (recipe by Agnes Bertha Marshall, 1898), "Neapolitan Roll" (recipe by Robert Wells, 1898), or "Church Window Cake".

The cake was purportedly named in honour of the marriage of Princess Victoria, a granddaughter of Queen Victoria, to Prince Louis of Battenberg in 1884. It refers to the German town of Battenberg, Hesse, which was the seat of an aristocratic family who died out in the early Middle Ages and whose title was transferred in 1851 to Countess Julia Hauke on the occasion of her marriage to Prince Alexander of Hesse and by Rhine; then first Countess of Battenberg, afterwards Princess of Battenberg, known in Britain since 1917 as Mountbatten.

The food historian Ivan Day refuted the idea that the four panels are in reference to four princes or houses, as older recipes show as many as 25 panels. He said the four panels were likely standardised by industrial bakers such as Lyons, as this was easier to produce on a production line.

According to The Oxford Companion to Food, the name "Battenberg cake" first appeared in print in 1903. However, a "Battenburg cake" appears in Frederick Vine, Saleable Shop Goods for Counter-Tray and Window ... (London, England: Office of the Baker and Confectioner, 1898).

== See also ==
- List of foods named after people
