= Julia Chan =

British actress and presenter

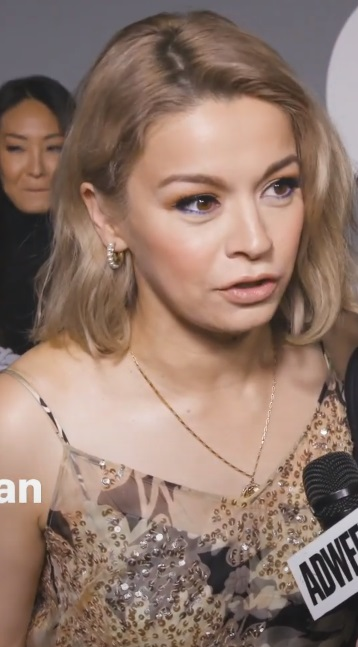
- Chan at The CW Upfront in 2019
- Born: May 9, 1983 (age 43); Cheshire, England
- Other name: Julia Taylor Ross
- Education: University College London; Harvard University (BA); The New School (MFA)
- Occupations: Actress; presenter
- Years active: 2009–present
- Spouse: Erik Ratensperger (m. 2011; div. 2019)

Julia Chan (also known as Julia Taylor Ross) is an English actress and presenter. Her television roles include Dr. Maggie Lin in the CTV series Saving Hope (2012–2017), as a co-host of the first two seasons of The Great Canadian Baking Show (2017–2019), and as Pepper Smith in The CW series Katy Keene (2020). In film, she played Sophia in the 2011 horror film Silent House.

== Early life and education ==
Chan was born and raised in Cheshire. Chan's father, Roy Chan, is a Hong Kong–based solicitor of Chinese heritage; her mother, Lorna, is a Canadian ballerina. She studied at University College London and then attended Harvard University in Cambridge, Massachusetts. While there, she frequently acted at the nearby American Repertory Theater. She graduated with a BA in History of Art and Architecture. She received her master's degree from New York's New School of Drama in 2010.

== Career ==
While still at graduate school, Chan gained a role in the Global Television Network's Rookie Blue (2010) (airing in the United States on ABC). Between 2011 and 2017, Chan played regular series character Dr. Maggie Lin for five seasons on CTV's Saving Hope, which was carried in the U.S. by NBC. She appeared in the role of Sophia in Silent House, a 2011 American horror film directed by Chris Kentis and Laura Lau, and the following year the romantic comedy film Missed Connections.

Chan has appeared in two Canadian television programs, miniseries Bloodletting & Miraculous Cures and series Republic of Doyle. In 2015, Chan appeared in the movie, Ava's Possessions. Chan has also made guest appearances in episodes of Gotham (2016) and Schitt's Creek (2017).

She hosted The Great Canadian Baking Show with Dan Levy, which premiered on 1 November 2017, on CBC. Chan returned as host for the second season in 2018, but neither she nor Levy returned for the show's third season.

On 21 February 2019, it was announced that she had landed the role of Pepper Smith in The CW's Katy Keene, a spin-off series of Riverdale which started airing in 2020. She appears alongside Lucy Hale, Ashleigh Murray, and Jonny Beauchamp.

In 2021, Chan appeared in the stage play 2:22 A Ghost Story. She appeared in Archive 81 which premiered on Netflix on 14 January 2022.

In 2024, she was cast in the medical drama television series Brilliant Minds.

== Personal life ==
Chan was married to Erik Ratensperger from 2011 to 2019.

== Filmography ==
=== Film ===
Year	Title	Role	Notes
2008	Twenty One	Kate	Credited as Julia Taylor Ross
2010	B.U.S.T.	Tina	Credited as Julia Taylor Ross
2010	Feather Weight	Kate	
2012	Silent House	Sophia	Credited as Julia Taylor Ross
2012	Missed Connections	Yoga Zoe	Credited as Julia Taylor Ross
2014	Dear Dead Abby	Rachel	Credited as Julia Taylor Ross
2015	Ava's Possessions	Punk Rock Chick	
2018	A Kid Like Jake	Michelle	
2021	Extinct	Mrs. Sun / Little Girl	Voice role

=== Television ===
Year	Title	Role	Notes
2010	Bloodletting & Miraculous Cures	Adrianne	Episode: "Family Practice"; credited as Julia Taylor Ross
2010	Rookie Blue	Emily Starling	Episode: "Mercury Retrograde"; credited as Julia Taylor Ross
2010, 2012	Republic of Doyle	Karen Becker	2 episodes; credited as Julia Taylor Ross
2012	Pan Am	Female Art Patron	Episode: "New Frontiers"; credited as Julia Taylor Ross
2012–2017	Saving Hope	Dr. Maggie Lin	Main role; 79 episodes; credited as Julia Taylor Ross
2016	Gotham	Karen Jennings	Episode: "Pinewood"; credited as Julia Taylor Ross
2017	Schitt's Creek	Elaine	Episode: "New Car"; credited as Julia Taylor Ross
2017–2018	The Great Canadian Baking Show	Herself	Co-host; credited as Julia Chan
2018–2019	Little Dog	Pamela	Recurring role; credited as Julia Chan
2019–2020	BoJack Horseman	Pickles Aplenty (voice)	Replaced Hong Chau
2020	Katy Keene	Pepper Smith	Main role; credited as Julia Chan
2022	Archive 81	Anabelle Cho	Main role; 8 episodes
2023	Accused	Sarah Tamura	Episode: "Jiro's Story"
2024	Before	Therapist	2 episodes
2024	Brilliant Minds	Alison Zhang-Whitaker	4 episodes
2023–2026	Will Trent	Ava Green	3 episodes
2025	Ripple	Kris	Main role; 8 episodes
