= Alan Shane Lewis =

Canadian comedian, actor and television host

Alan Shane Lewis is a Canadian comedian, actor and television host, best known as the co-host with Ann Pornel of The Great Canadian Baking Show since season 4.

An alumnus of The Second City's Toronto company who appeared most notably in the 2019 revue If I Could #Throwback Time, he is a partner with Coko Galore, PHATT Al, Brandon Ash-Mohammed, Nkasi Ogbonnah, Ajahnis Charley, Aba Amuquandoh and Brandon Hackett in Untitled Black Sketch Project, Canada's first all-Black Canadian sketch comedy troupe.

He has also had acting roles in the television series Christian & Nat and the short film Duppy, and competed in episodes of Roast Battle Canada

Lewis and Pornel received a Canadian Screen Award nomination for Best Host or Presenter in a Factual or Reality/Competition Series at the 10th Canadian Screen Awards in 2022 for The Great Canadian Baking Show.
