= Ann Pornel =

Canadian comedian and actress

- Education: University of Toronto
- Known for: Great Canadian Baking Show, This Hour Has 22 Minutes, Second City Toronto, The Baroness von Sketch Show
- Height: 5 ft 3 in (160 cm)
- Website: annpornel.com

Ann Pornel is a Canadian sketch comedian, actress, and television host based in Toronto.

Pornel was born in the Philippines and immigrated to Canada with her family as a child. She grew up in the High Park area of Toronto.

Pornel got into sketch comedy as an undergraduate student in the sciences at the University of Toronto and seeking a non-academic outlet. She is a former member of The Sketchersons and performed in the troupe's weekly sketch show Sunday Night Live. She later joined The Second City and starred in the all-woman production She the People featuring Second City sketches written by and about women. In a review of the show for NOW, Glenn Sumi called Pornel a "force of nature." She was named the 2017 Performer of the Year by My Entertainment World.

In 2021, she debuted alongside Alan Shane Lewis as the co-hosts of the fourth season of The Great Canadian Baking Show. A fashion enthusiast, Pornel collaborated with designer Vanessa Magic to come up with her wardrobe for the show. Prior to her co-hosting duties on the Baking Show, Pornel appeared in guest roles on the Baroness von Sketch Show and This Hour Has 22 Minutes. In 2023, she guest starred in season 2 of Run the Burbs episode 5, "Phestival of Life" and episode 7, "Phresh Start" playing real estate agent Orelei Pena. In the same year she appeared in the film Mother of All Shows.

Lewis and Pornel received a Canadian Screen Award nomination for Best Host or Presenter in a Factual or Reality/Competition Series at the 10th Canadian Screen Awards in 2022 for The Great Canadian Baking Show. In 2023, she was nominated and was the recipient of the Top 25 Canadian Immigrant Awards,
