= Kyla Kennaley =

Canadian pastry chef and TV bake show judge

Kyla Kennaley (also Kyla Eaglesham) is a Canadian pastry chef who has been a judge on The Great Canadian Baking Show since series three in 2019.

Kennaley was raised in Ontario, where her parents operated a resort in the Kawarthas. She received a Culinary Management Diploma from Algonquin College and a bachelor's degree from the University of Ottawa. After graduation, she worked as a flight attendant with Air Canada. She opened a pastry shop in Toronto in 2004 and became noted as a baking media personality, serving as "In-House Pastry Expert" on Steven and Chris. In 2019, she and her husband moved to London, where she worked as a talent development manager at the Savoy Hotel. In 2024, she worked as the learning and development manager at the Corinthia Hotel London. As of 2025, she is Head of Learning at Dorchester Collection Academy while also teaching at the George Brown College Centre for Hospitality and Culinary Arts in Toronto and continuing to judge the Great Canadian Baking Show.
