= Bruno Feldeisen =

French chef, restaurateur and television personality

- Born: 1964 or 1965 (age 61–62); Clermont-Ferrand, France
- Culinary career
- Cooking style: French
- Current restaurant(s): Semiahmoo Resort, Blaine, Washington
- Previous restaurants: Patina, Los Angeles, California; Four Seasons Hotel New York, New York; Metropolitan Hotel, Toronto, Ontario; Soléa, San Francisco, California; Four Seasons Hotel Vancouver, British Columbia
- Television show: The Great Canadian Baking Show (2017-)

Bruno Feldeisen (born 1964 or 1965) is a French chef, restaurateur and television personality. He is current executive chef at the Semiahmoo Resort near Blaine, Washington and a judge for The Great Canadian Baking Show on CBC Television. Aside from his work as a chef, Feldeisen is a spokesman for the mental health advocacy group Anxiety Canada.

He is the former executive pastry chef for the Four Seasons Hotel New York in New York City and Four Seasons Hotel Vancouver in Vancouver. Feldeisen is also a former instructor at the Pacific Institute of Culinary Arts and a multiple James Beard Award nominee.

== Early life ==
Feldeisen was born in Clermont-Ferrand, France. He moved to the United States in the 1980s and permanently relocated to Vancouver in 2007.

== Television career ==
He has been a competitor on the cooking competition reality series Sweet Genius, Chopped Canada, Donut Showdown, and Beat Bobby Flay.

Since November 2017, Feldeisen has been a judge for The Great Canadian Baking Show, a Canadian adaptation of The Great British Bake Off produced for CBC Television.
