= Bou Ismaïl District =

- District
- Location of Bou Ismaïl within Tipaza Province
- Country: Algeria
- Province: Tipaza Province
- Time zone: UTC+1 (CET)

Bou Ismaïl District is a district of Tipaza Province, Algeria.

The district is further divided into 4 municipalities:

- Bou Ismaïl
- Aïn Tagourait
- Bouharoun
- Khemisti
