= Sidi Ghiles =

Coordinates: 36°35′N 2°07′E

Sidi Ghiles Novi Novi
- Commune and town
- Location of Sidi Ghiles within Tipaza Province
- Country: Algeria
- Province: Tipaza Province

Population (2008)
  - Total: 15,281
- Time zone: UTC+1 (CET)
- Postal code: 42115
- Website: Archived 9 December 2007 at the Wayback Machine

Sidi Ghiles (Arabic: سيدي غيلاس; formerly Novi during the French colonization) is a town on Algeria's Mediterranean coast. The municipality of Novi is located about 32 kilometres (20 mi) west of Tipasa and 7 kilometres (4.3 mi) southwest of Cherchell. This agricultural locality is 100 kilometres (62 mi) from Algiers.

Novi, known for its fertile soil, vineyards and wines, is located by the sea. It is a modern village despite its traditionally typical so-called "colonization" villages with its traced streets, airy, lined with houses and villas resplendent with whiteness.

An agricultural colony, Novi was originally managed by the military authority and founded by decree of the National Assembly of 19 September 1848 and by order of the Minister of War Louis Juchault de Lamoricière (1806-1865) on 27 September that same year. It is one of the first seven centers of colonization created in Algeria.

== Names ==
After the independence of Algeria on 5 July 1962, the town of Novi became known as Sidi Ghiles.

== History ==
=== Inhabitation ===
Located in the middle of the Algerian vineyards between the sea and mountains, Sidi Ghiles' initial population was mainly made up of the political deportees of 1848, and became an annex of Cherchell.

It was, then, a municipality that covered an area of 1,647 hectares (4,070 acres) with a population of 1,047 inhabitants including 423 French. Most of the other inhabitants were native Berbers indigenous to the surrounding hills and Atlas Mountains.

In 1903, Mayor Léon Roseau gave Novi a school group. In 1908, some owners grouped themselves to create a co-operative wine cellar of 5,000 hectares (12,000 acres) whose notability has crossed the borders of North Africa.

=== The department ===
The department of Algiers is one of the French departments of Algeria, which existed between 1848 and 1962. Considered a French province, Algeria was departmentalized on 9 December 1848. The departments created on that date were the civil zone of the three provinces corresponding to the Beyliks of the regency of Algiers then recently conquered. Therefore, the city of Algiers was made the prefecture of the department bearing its name, then covering the center of Algeria, leaving to the east the department of Constantine and to the west the department of Oran.

On 28 January 1956 an administrative reform, to take account of strong population growth, separated the department of Algiers from its hinterland, creating, on 20 May 1957, three additional departments: Médéa, Orleansville and Tizi Ouzou. The district of Cherchell, in the department of Orleansville, consisted of eight localities: Bouyamine, Cherchell, Genoa Fountain, Gouraya, Marceau (Menaceur), Novi, Villbourg and Zurich (Sidi Amar).

=== The emigration ===
On 11 August 1962, 293 of the 300 Frenchmen of Novi left by boat for Marseille, under the protection of the French army.
