= Ahmer El Aïn District =

Coordinates: 36.5078°N 2.5284°E

- District
- Location of Ahmer El Aïn within Tipaza Province
- Country: Algeria
- Province: Tipaza Province
- Time zone: UTC+1 (CET)

Ahmer El Aïn District is a district of Tipaza Province, Algeria.

The district is further divided into 3 municipalities:

- Ahmar El Ain
- Bourkika
- Sidi Rached
