= Gouraya District =

- District
- Location of Gouraya within Tipaza Province
- Country: Algeria
- Province: Tipaza Province
- Time zone: UTC+1 (CET)

Gouraya District is a district of Tipaza Province, Algeria.

The district is further divided into 3 municipalities:

- Gouraya
- Messelmoun
- Aghbal
