= Sidi Amar District =

- District
- Location of Sidi Amar within Tipaza Province

- Location within Algeria
- Country: Algeria
- Province: Tipaza Province
- Time zone: UTC+1 (CET)

Sidi Amar District is a district of Tipaza Province, Algeria.

The district is further divided into 3 municipalities:

- Sidi Amar
- Nador
- Menaceur
