= Koléa District =

- District
- Country: Algeria
- Province: Tipaza Province
- Time zone: UTC+1 (CET)

Koléa District is a district of Tipaza Province, Algeria.

The district is further divided into 3 municipalities:

- Koléa
- Chaiba
- Attatba
