= Gérard Lecointe =

French general

Général de corps d'armée Gérard Lecointe
- Born: 7 July 1912; Poitiers, France
- Died: 30 January 2009 (aged 96); La Baule-Escoublac, France
- Military career
- Allegiance: France
- Service: French Army
- Service years: 1930–1972
- Rank: Général de corps d'armée
- Units: 1st Regiment of Moroccan Tirailleurs; 7th Moroccan Infantry Regiment
- Commands: 24th Guard Chasseur Battalion; Cherchell District; 11th Mechanized Brigade; French Forces of the Palatinate; 4th Infantry Division; French forces of the Levant and the Sahara; French Forces in Algeria; 8th Infantry Division; French Forces in Germany
- Conflicts: Pacification of French Morocco; Grand Atlas campaign; World War II; Phoney War; Battle of France; Battle of Gembloux; Tunisian campaign; Italian campaign; Operation Dragoon; Vosges campaign; Cold War; Algerian War
- Awards: Grand Officer of the Legion of Honour; Grand Officer of the National Order of Merit; Grand Officer of the Order of Merit of the Federal Republic of Germany

Gérard Pierre Louis François Armand Lecointe (7 July 1912, in Poitiers, France – 30 January 2009, in La Baule-Escoublac, France) was a French général de corps d'armée. He served in World War II and the Cold War and saw colonial service in French North Africa. He was the last commander of French forces in Algeria, and completed his career as commander-in-chief of the French Forces in Germany.

== Biography ==
=== Early life and career ===
Lecointe was born in Poitiers on 7 July 1912, the son of Capitaine (Captain) Henri Lecointe, an Officer of the Legion of Honor. He attended high school in Douai, where he won eleven awards for excellence. He originally planned to attend the École Polytechnique, but instead chose to attend the military academy at Saint-Cyr, which he entered in 1930 at the age of eighteen in the "Joffre class." While at the school, he was promoted from cadet to aspirant in 1931.

Lecointe graduated from Saint-Cyr in 1932 and was appointed sous-lieutenant (second lieutenant) in the 1st Regiment of Moroccan Tirailleurs, in which he took part in the final operations of the pacification of French Morocco in the Grand Atlas in 1933 and in southern Morocco in 1934. He received his baptism of fire at Iskerioul on 3 September 1933.

=== World War II ===
World War II broke out in September 1939, and Lecointe returned to France in October 1939 with the 1st Moroccan Division, in which he commanded the 2nd Company of the 1st Regiment of Moroccan Tirailleurs. During the "Phoney War" period, he took part in the outpost battles of December 1939 along the French border with Germany. During the Battle of France, he distinguished himself at the Battle of Gembloux in the vicinity of Gembloux, Belgium, on 14–15 May 1940, during which he was the last French officer to leave the soil of Gembloux when the high command ordered a retreat. He was seriously wounded near Lille on 24 May 1940 and was made a Knight of the Legion of Honour. The Battle of France ended with France′s surrender to the Germans on 22 June 1940.

Lecointe resumed combat in 1942 as a company commander in the 7th Moroccan Infantry Regiment, operating as part of the Free French forces against German and Italian forces in Tunisia. At the head of his company, he distinguished himself during violent assaults on enemy positions in Tunisia in December 1942 and April 1943. He later participated in the battles of the Italian campaign with the French Expeditionary Corps in 1944 and with the French 1st Army in the Allied invasion of Southern France (Operation Dragoon) in August 1944 and the subsequent campaign in the Vosges and to the Rhine with the 1st Regiment of Moroccan Tirailleurs.

=== Post-World War II ===
After World War II, LeCointe returned to French Morocco. He was made an Officer of the Legion of Honor on an exceptional basis in 1948 and entered the École supérieure de Guerre (France′s war college) in 1949. Completing his studies there in 1951, he was promoted to commandant that year and posted to the general staff of the French Forces in Germany, where he served as head of the operations office until 1954. He then took command of the 24th Guard Chasseur Battalion, a unit of the French 5th Armored Division, at Bad Bergzabern, West Germany.

In 1956, Lecointe left West Germany for Algeria, where he successively served as Chief of Staff of the Army Corps of Algiers and then for 30 months as commander of the Cherchell District. Made a Commander of the Legion of Honor on an exceptional basis in 1958, he left Algeria in 1959 for Fribourg, France, where he served as deputy to the general commanding the French 3rd Infantry Division. In 1960, he became auditor at Saint-Cyr at the Centre des hautes études militaires (Center for Advanced Military Studies, or CHEM) and the Institut des hautes études de défense nationale (Institute for Advanced National Defense Studies, or IHEDN).

Promoted to général de brigade (brigadier general) in 1961, LeCointe returned that year to West Germany and took command of the 11th Mechanized Brigade at Landau and of the French Forces of the Palatinate. In 1963 he was promoted to général de division, and from 1963 to 1964 he was in Algeria, where he commanded the 4th Infantry Division and the French Forces of the Levant and the Sahara. He was the last commander of the French forces in Algeria, which under his command totaled 40,000 men.

In 1966, Leconte took command of the 8th Infantry Division at Compiègne, France, and then returned to Paris as first assistant to the military governor of Paris. In 1970, he was promoted to général de corps d'armée and succeeded General Jacques Massu as commander-in-chief of the French Forces in Germany, which under his command totaled 110,000 French personnel, including 73,000 soldiers and 38,000 civilians. He completed this tour in 1972 and retired from the French Army.

Lecointe died on 30 January 2009 at La Baule-Escoublac, France.

== Personal life ==
Lecointe was married to Mattéa Celli. After she died, he married Christiane Pensereau, the daughter of Colonel Léonce Pensereau and Denise Naudeau. His second marriage ended in divorce.

== Awards and honors ==
=== French awards ===
- Grand Officer of the Legion of Honour
- Commander of the Legion of Honour
- Knight of the Legion of Honour
- Grand Officer of the National Order of Merit
- Croix de Guerre with two palms and two stars
- Cross for Military Valour with two palms and one star
- Resistance Medal
- Cross of the resistance volunteer combatant
- Combatant's Cross
- Medal for voluntary military service
- Commemorative medal for voluntary service in Free France
- 1939–1945 Commemorative war medal with Africa, Italy, and France clasps
- North Africa Security and Order Operations Commemorative Medal with Algeria clasp
- Medal for the War Wounded

=== Foreign awards ===
- Grand Officer of the Order of Merit of the Federal Republic of Germany
- Officer of the Order of Glory (French protectorate of Tunisia)
- For his actions during the Battle of Gembloux in May 1940, Lecointe was made an Honorary Citizen of Gembloux, Belgium, in 1954.
