= Hadjout District =

Coordinates: 36°30′45″N 2°24′50″E

- District
- Location of Hadjout within Tipaza Province
- Country: Algeria
- Province: Tipaza Province
- Time zone: UTC+1 (CET)

Hadjout District is a district of Tipaza Province, Algeria.

The district is further divided into 2 municipalities:

- Hadjout
- Meurad
