= Cherchell District =

- District
- Location of Cherchell within Tipaza Province
- Country: Algeria
- Province: Tipaza Province
- Time zone: UTC+1 (CET)

Cherchell District is a district of Tipaza Province, Algeria.

The district is further divided into 4 municipalities:

- Cherchell
- Sidi Ghiles
- Hadjeret Ennous
- Sidi Semiane
