= Bourkika =

Coordinates: 36°30′N 2°29′E

Bourkika بلدية بورقيقة
- Commune and town
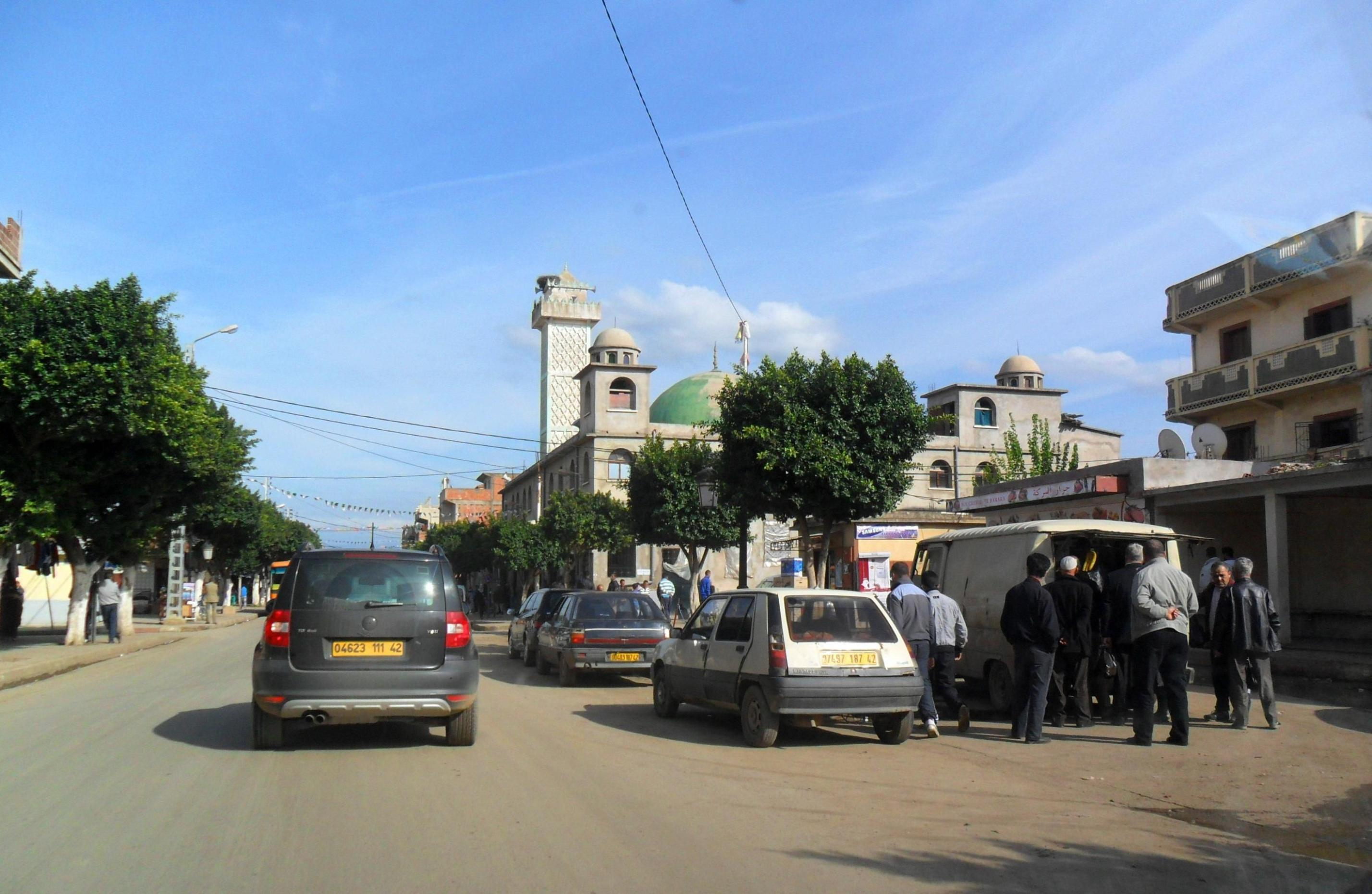

- Location of Bourkika within Tipaza Province
- Country: Algeria
- Province: Tipaza Province

Population (1998)
  - Total: 22,118
- Time zone: UTC+1 (CET)

Bourkika is a town and commune in Tipaza Province in northern Algeria. The territory of the municipality is located to the southeast of the wilaya, at 36.4931118n, 2.475915e about 18 km southeast of Tipaza. In 1984, Bourkika became part of the commune of Douaouda.

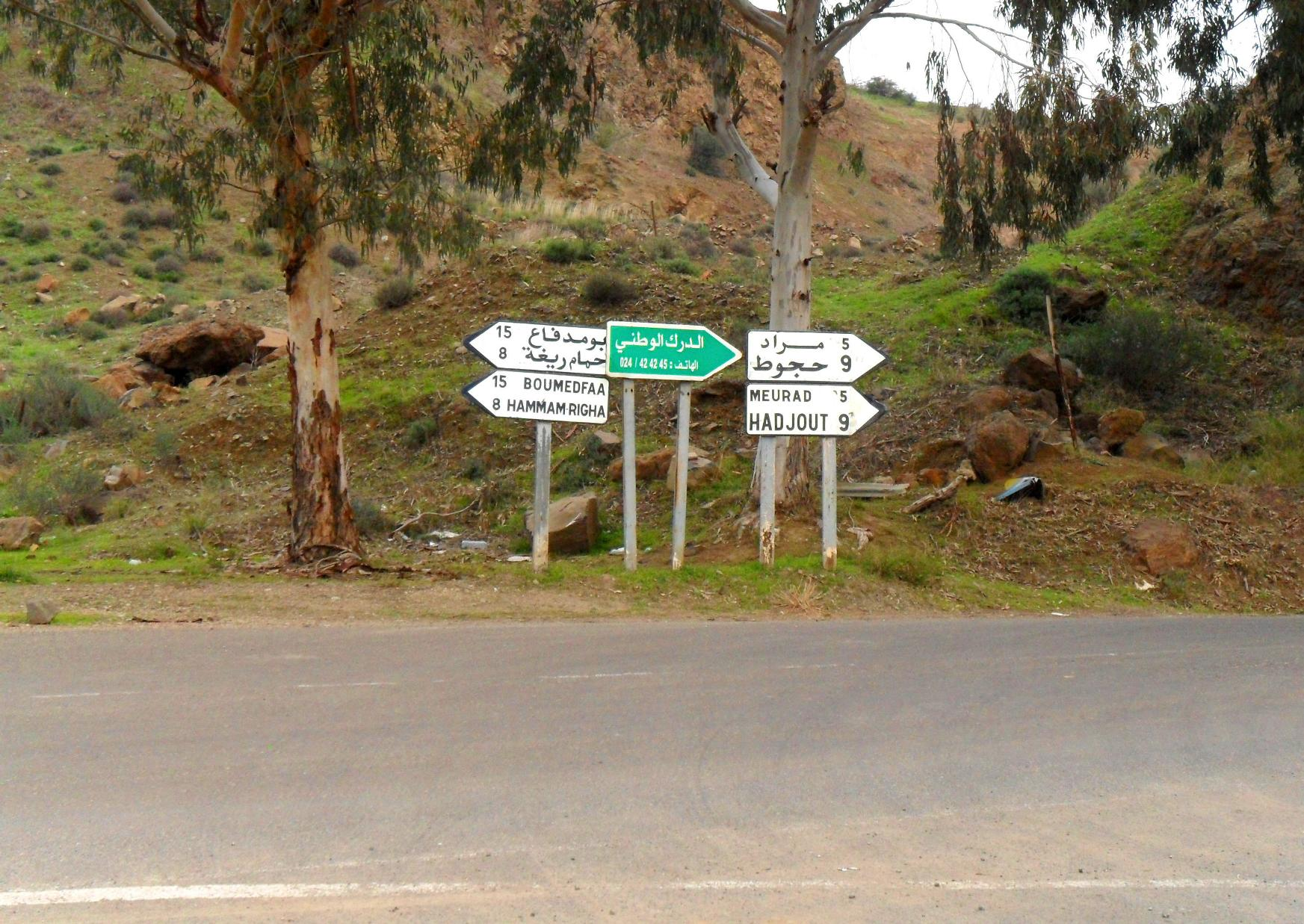
The area around Bourkika.
