= Tipaza Province =

Province of Algeria

Tipaza Province ولاية تيبازة
- Province
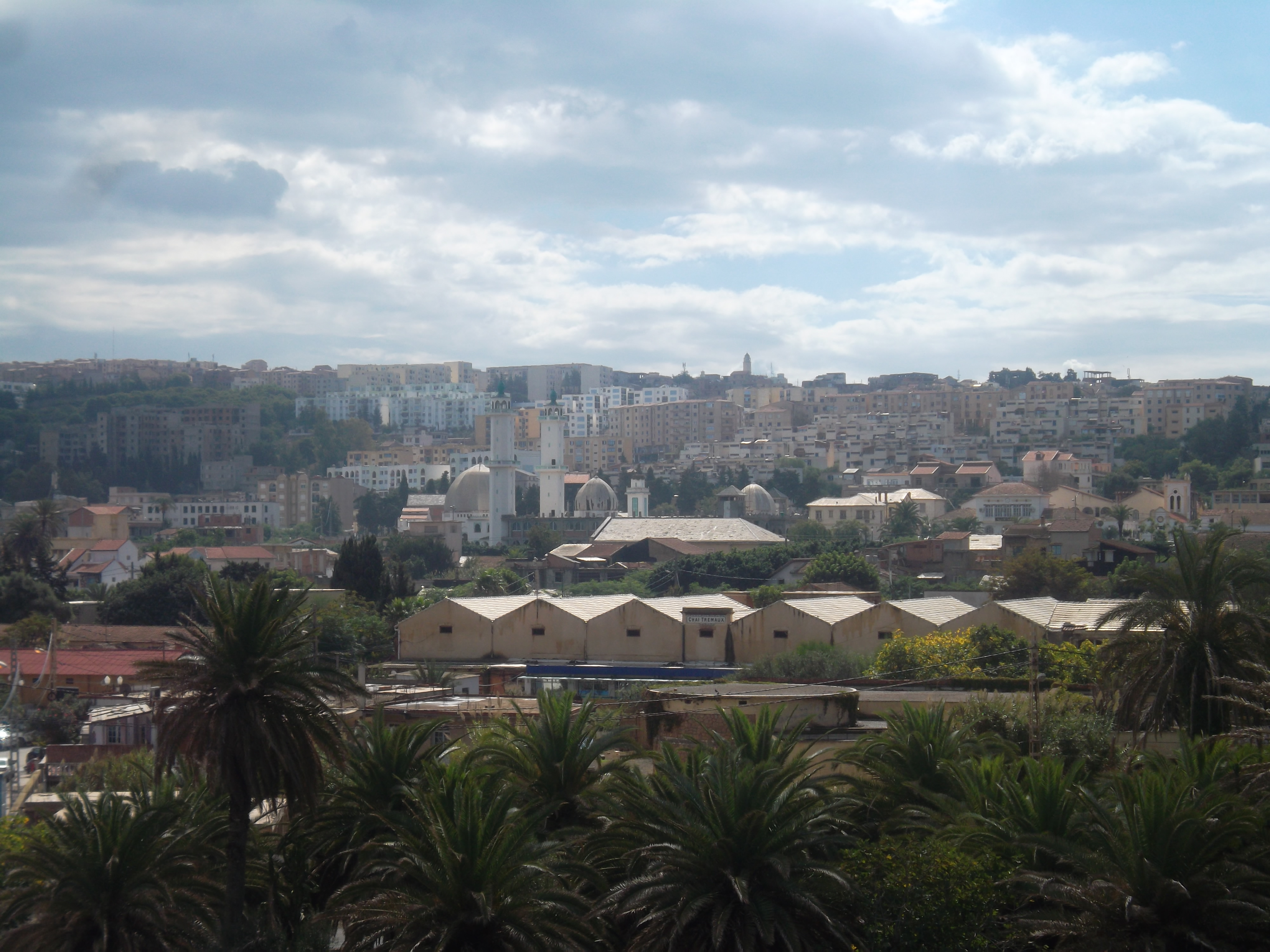
- City of Tipaza

- Map of Algeria highlighting Tipaza
- Coordinates: 36°35′N 2°26′E
- Country: Algeria
- Capital: Tipaza

Government
  - Wāli: Ali Moulai

Area
  - Total: 2,166 km^{2} (836 sq mi)

Population (2008)
  - Total: 617,661
  - Density: 285.2/km^{2} (738.6/sq mi)
- Time zone: UTC+01 (CET)
- Area Code: +213 (0) 24
- ISO 3166 code: DZ-42
- Districts: 10
- Municipalities: 28

Tipaza or Tipasa (Arabic: ولاية تيبازة, Tibaza, older Tefessedt) is a province (wilaya) on the coast of Algeria, Its capital is Tipaza, 50 km west of Algiers, the capital of Algeria, and 70 km east of Mahelma Forest, with a population of 706054 inhabitants in 2019, with a density of 414/square kilometers.

== History ==
The province was created from Blida Province in 1984.

== Administrative divisions ==
The province is divided into 10 districts (daïras), which are further divided into 28 communes or municipalities.

=== Districts ===
1. Ahmer El Aïn
2. Bou Ismaïl
3. Cherchell
4. Damous
5. Fouka
6. Gouraya
7. Hadjout
8. Koléa
9. Sidi Amar
10. Tipaza

=== Communes ===
1. Aghbal
2. Ahmar El Ain
3. Ain Tagourait
4. Attatba
5. Beni Milleuk
6. Bou Ismaïl
7. Bouharoun
8. Bourkika
9. Chaiba
10. Cherchell
11. Damous
12. Douaouda
13. Fouka
14. Gouraya
15. Hadjeret Ennous
16. Hadjout
17. Khemisti
18. Kolea
19. Larhat
20. Menaceur
21. Messelmoun
22. Meurad
23. Nador
24. Sidi Amar
25. Sidi Ghiles
26. Sidi Rached
27. Sidi Semiane
28. Tipaza
