= Bou Ismaïl =

Bou Ismaïl بواسماعيل
- Commune and town
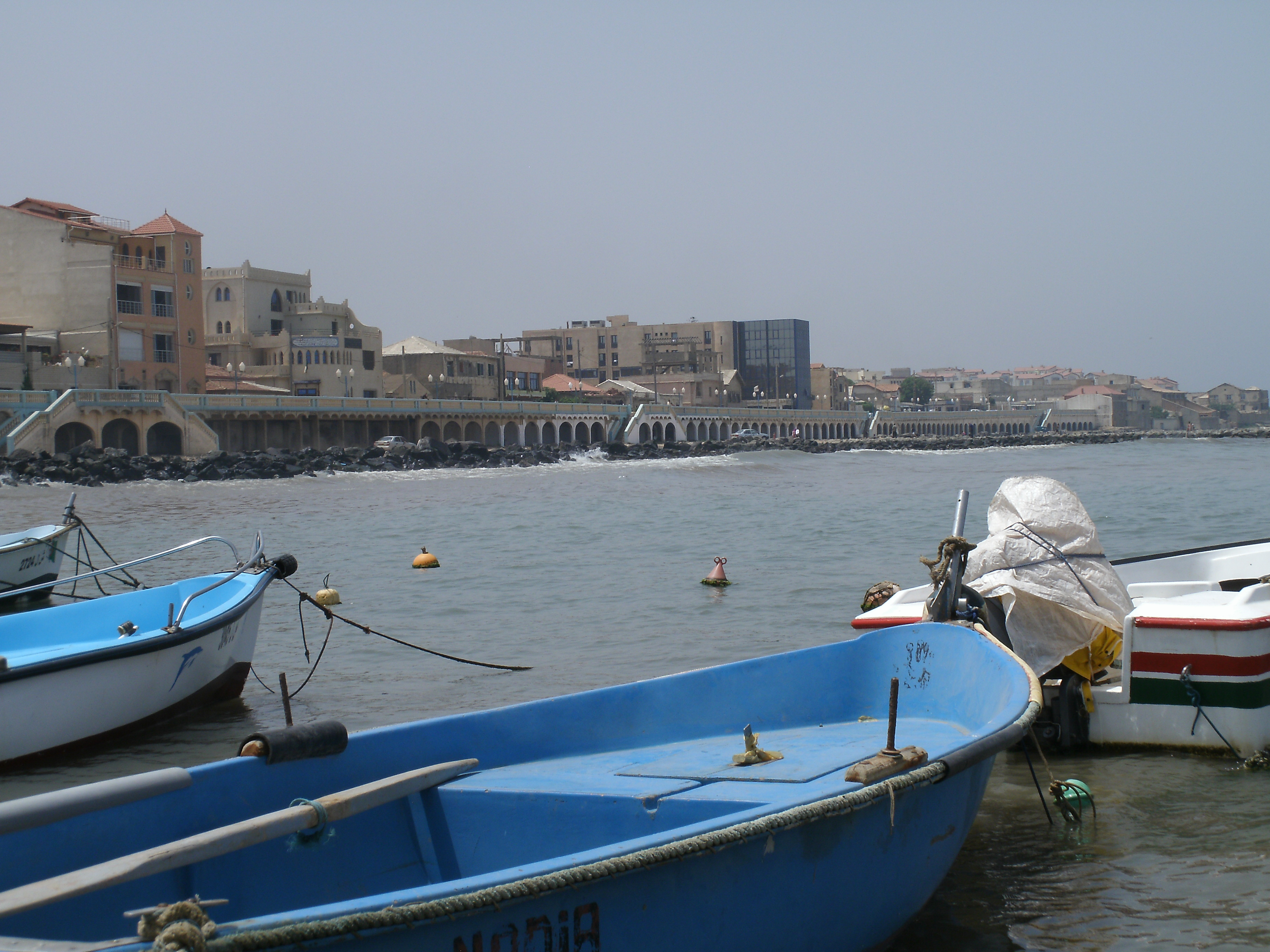

- Location of Bou Ismaïl within Tipaza Province

- Location within Algeria
- Coordinates: 36°39′N 2°42′E
- Country: Algeria
- Province: Tipaza Province
- Time zone: UTC+1 (CET)

Bou Ismaïl (Algerian Arabic: بو إسماعيل) is a city in Bou Ismaïl District, Tipasa Province, Algeria. In 2008 it had a population of 40,984. Its French colonial name was Castiglione.

== Notable residents ==
- Jean-Pierre Bacri, French actor
- Boualem Khoukhi, Algerian-Qatari footballer
