= Koléa =

Kolea القليعة
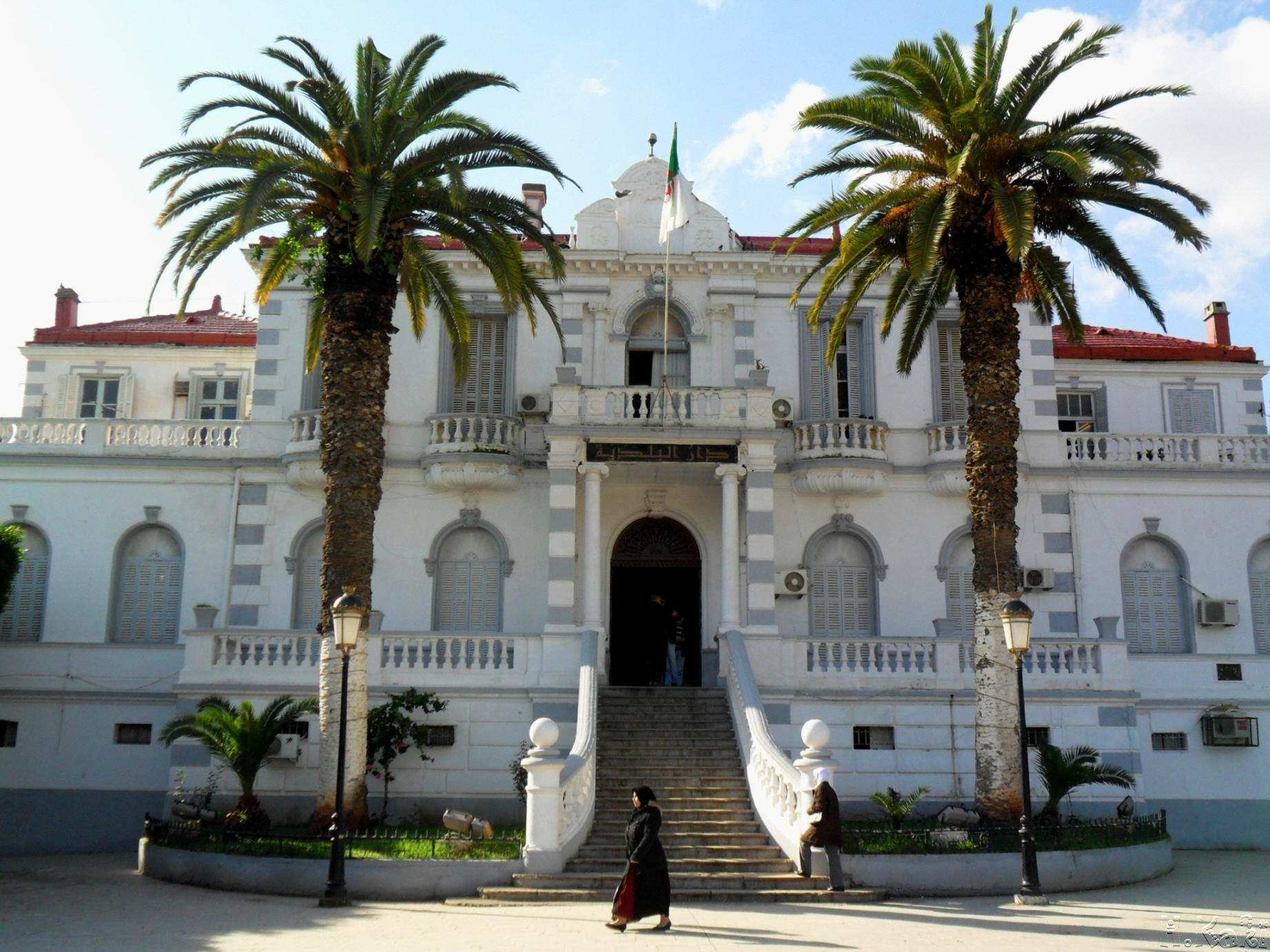
- Kolea city hall

- Koléa District highlighted in Tipaza Province

- Location of Koléa in Algeria
- Coordinates: 36°38′26″N 2°45′54″E
- Country: Algeria
- Province: Tipaza
- District: Koléa

Population (Census 2008)
  - Total: 61,643

Koléa (Arabic: القليعة) is a city in Tipaza Province, northern Algeria, located approximately 17 miles (27 km) southwest of Algiers. Its population in 2010 was 46,685.

== History ==
Kolea was founded in 1550 by Hayreddin Barbarossa. In 1838, Lamoricère moved there with his regiment of Zouaves and built four forts: at Fouka, Tombourouf, Ben Azzouz, and Mokta-Khera.
