= Douaouda =

- Commune and town
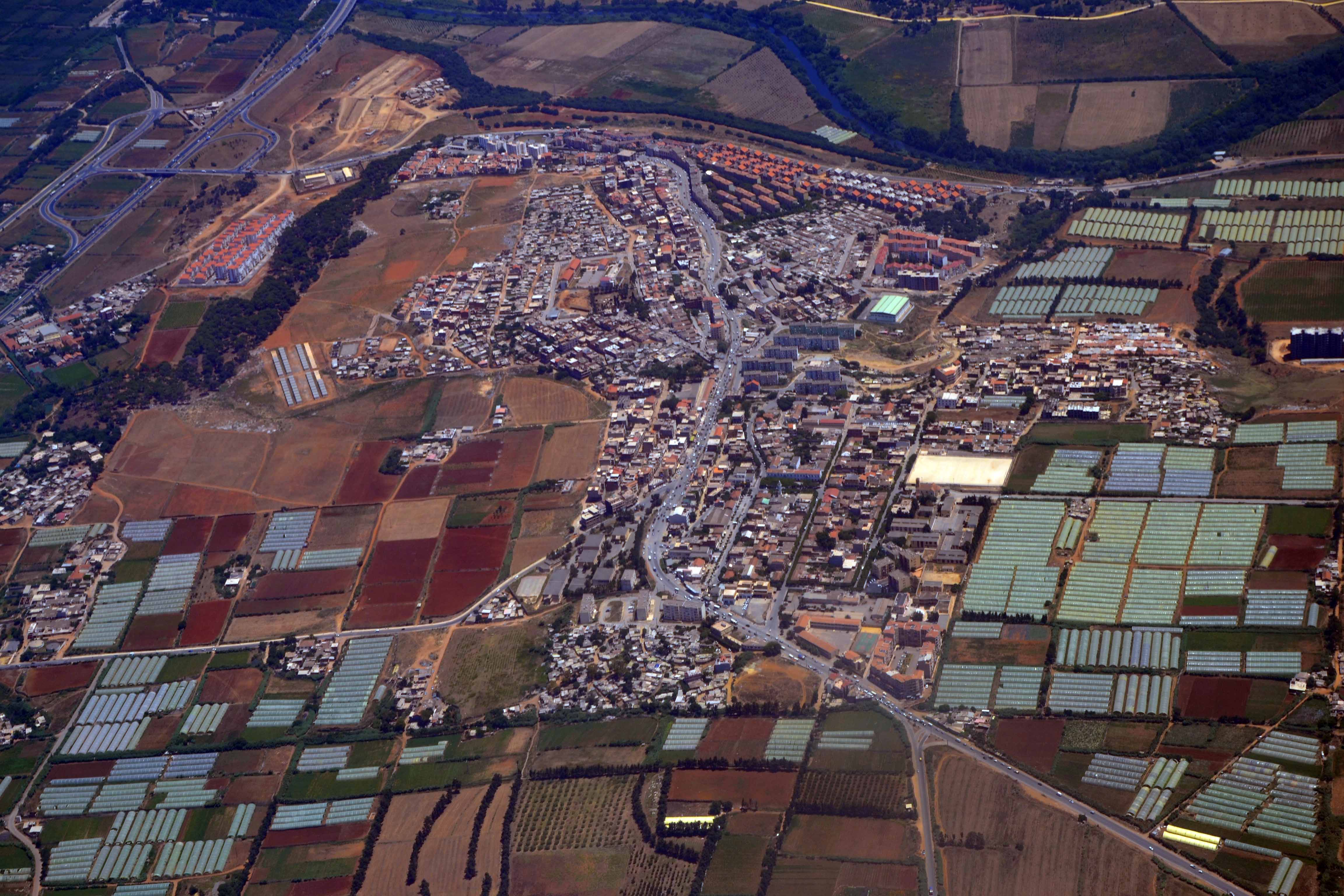

- Location within Algeria
- Coordinates: 36.666667°N 2.783333°E
- Country: Algeria
- Province: Tipaza Province
- Time zone: UTC+1 (CET)

Douaouda is a town and commune in Tipaza Province in northern Algeria.
