= Chaiba =

Coordinates: 36°37′28″N 2°43′45″E

- Commune and town
- Location of Chaiba within Tipaza Province
- Country: Algeria
- Province: Tipaza Province
- Time zone: UTC+1 (CET)

Chaiba is a town and commune in Tipaza Province in northern Algeria.
