= Larhat =

Coordinates: 36°33′N 1°48′E

- Commune and town
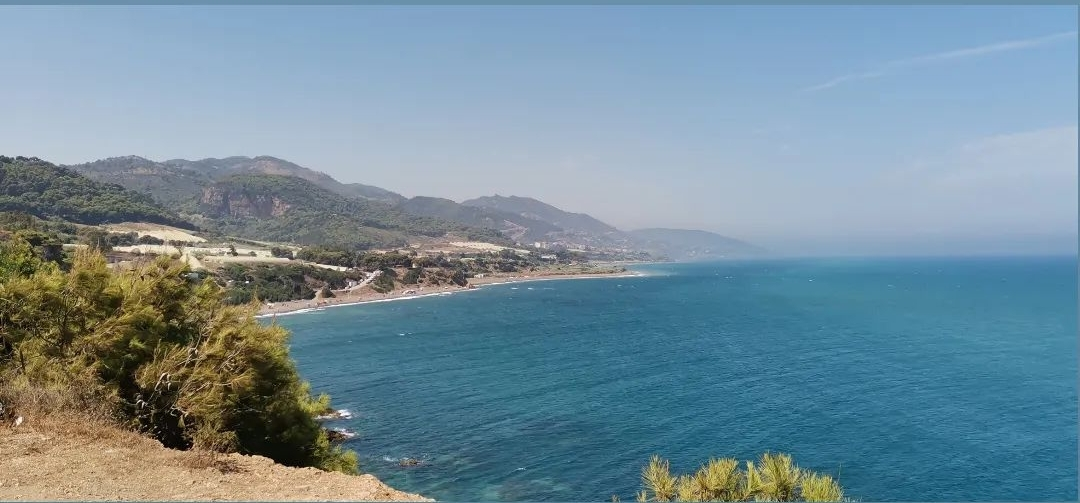

- Location of Larhat within Tipaza Province
- Country: Algeria
- Province: Tipaza Province
- Time zone: UTC+1 (CET)

Larhat is a town and commune in Tipaza Province in northern Algeria.
