= Ahmar El Ain =

Coordinates: 36°28′41″N 2°33′50″E

Ahmer El Ain أحمر العين
- Commune and town
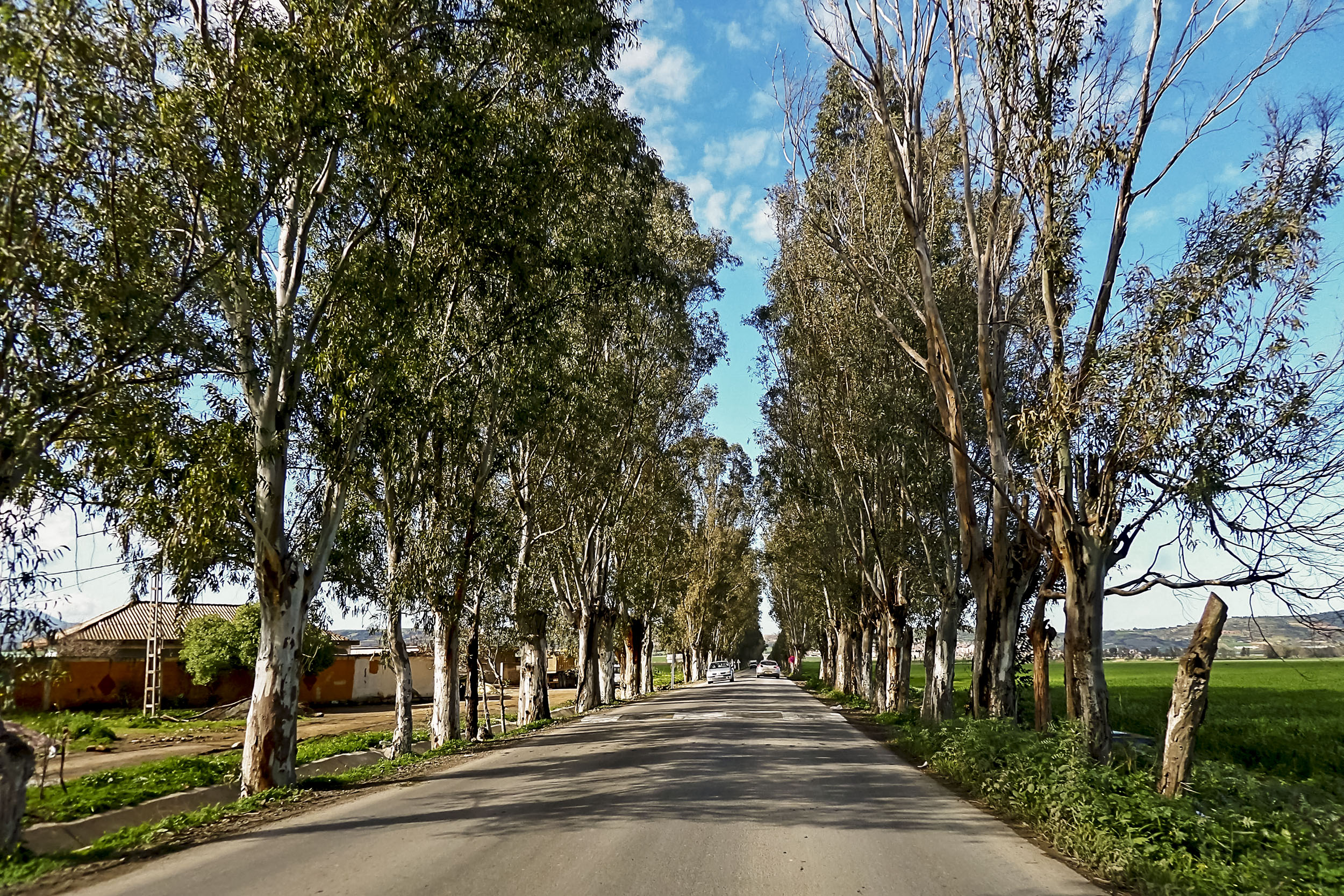

- Location of Ahmer Al Ain within Tipaza Province
- Country: Algeria
- Province: Tipaza Province
- District: Ahmer El Ain

Area
  - Total: 36 sq mi (92 km^{2})
- Elevation: 515 ft (157 m)

Population (2011)
  - Total: 29,000
- Time zone: UTC+1 (CET)
- Postal code: 42005
- Area code: ±213 (0) 24

Ahmar El Ain is a town and commune in Tipaza Province in northern Algeria.
