= Aïn Tagourait =

Coordinates: 36°36′13″N 2°36′34″E

Ain Tagourait
- Commune and town
- Country: Algeria
- Province: Tipaza Province
- Time zone: UTC+1 (CET)

Ain Tagourait is a town and commune in Tipaza Province in northern Algeria.
