= Damous =

Coordinates: 36°33′N 1°42′E

Damous الداموس Catula
- Commune and town
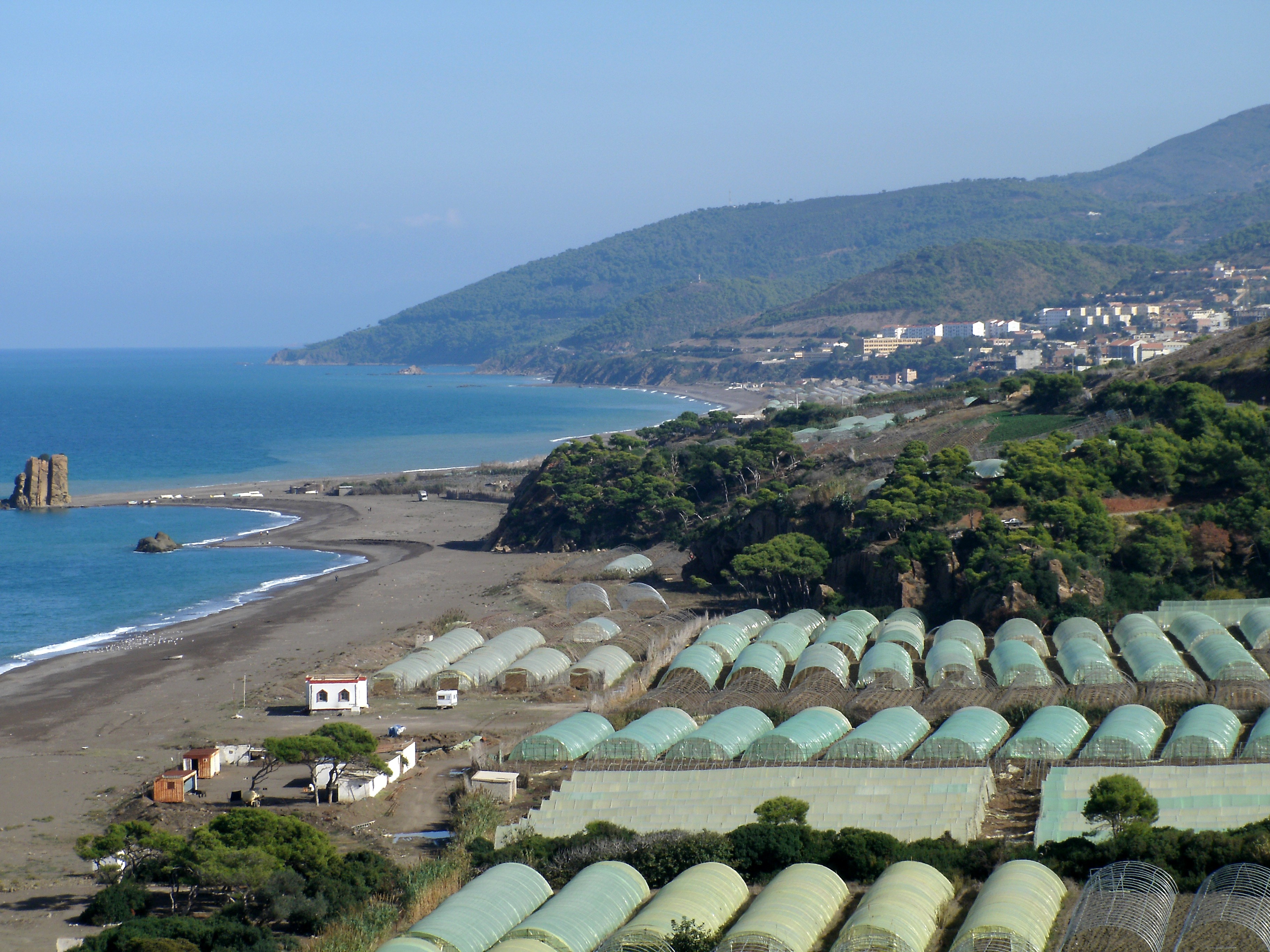

- Location of Damous within Tipaza Province
- Country: Algeria
- Province: Tipaza Province

Population (1998)
  - Total: 17,111
- Time zone: UTC+1 (CET)

Damous is a town and commune in Tipaza Province in northern Algeria.

The territory of the commune of Damous is located northwest of the wilaya of Tipaza, about 70 km west of Tipaza, 50 km west of Cherchell and 55 km east of Ténès. At its creation in 1984, the municipality of Damous consists of seven localities:

- Béni Hatita
- Béni Zioui
- Damous
- Oued Harbil
- Roff
- Reggou
- Remamène

== History ==
The origin of the village dates back to a very distant period. It was once a trading post or a small port of Phoenician cabotage called Cartili before becoming the ancient Carcome of the Romans.

The construction of the colonial village, Dupleix, dates back to the end of the nineteenth century in 1896. It naturally expanded with the construction of a town hall, a school with two classes, a wash house, A church, a bridge crossing the Wadi Damous and the barracks for the garrison.

In 1896, during the colonization, the city is named Dupleix and is part of the department of Algiers. After independence, it takes the name of Damous.

According to the elders of the village Dâ; Grandfather in kabyle; And Mous; The first name Moussa; Will give its name to this locality and to the wadi which crosses it
