= Sidi Rached =

Coordinates: 36°33′45″N 2°32′00″E

- Commune and town
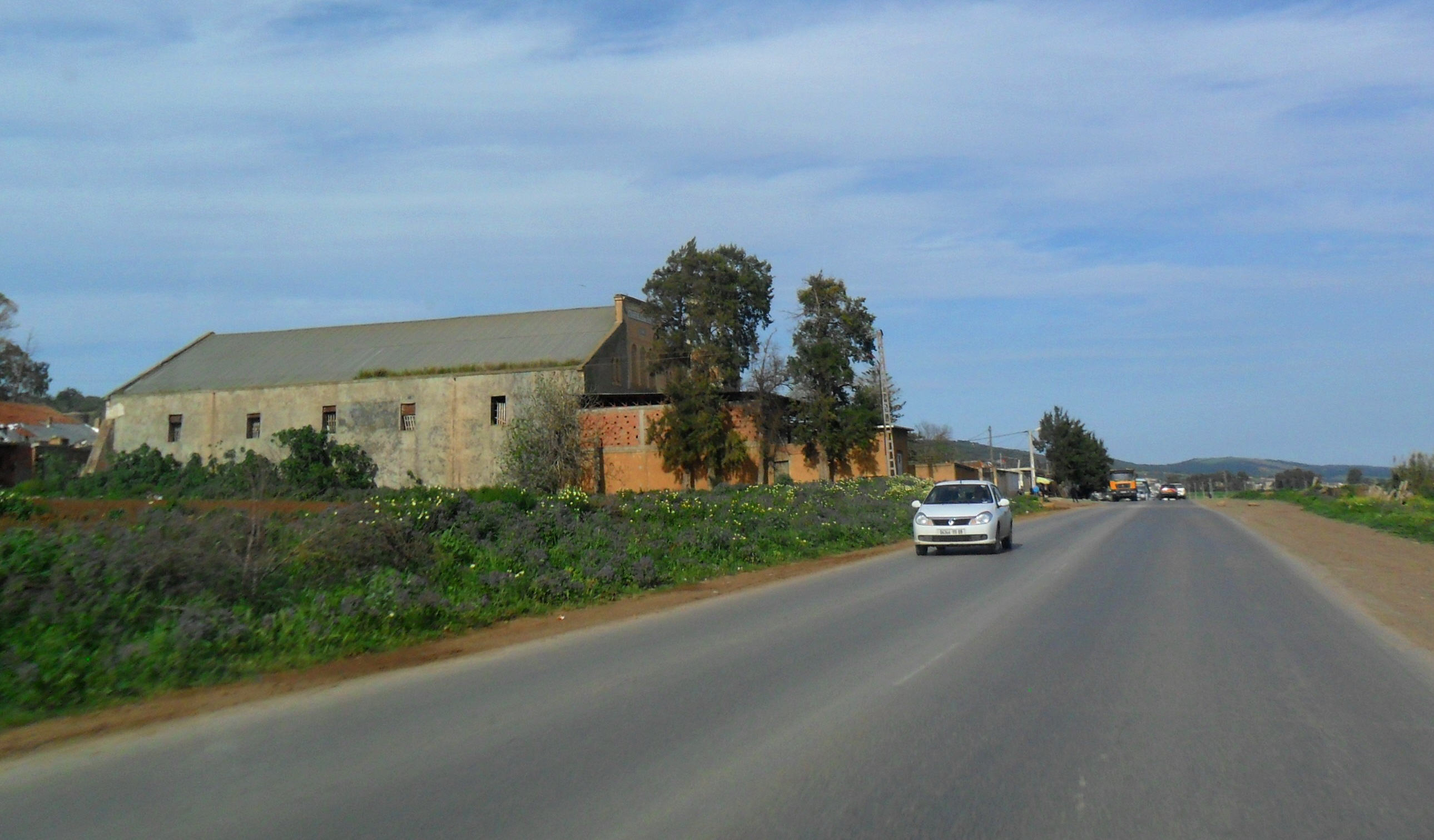

- Location of Sidi Rached within Tipaza Province
- Country: Algeria
- Province: Tipaza Province
- Time zone: UTC+1 (CET)

Sidi Rached is a town and commune in Tipaza Province in northern Algeria.
