= Hadjeret Ennous =

Coordinates: 36°34′24″N 2°03′07″E

- Commune and town
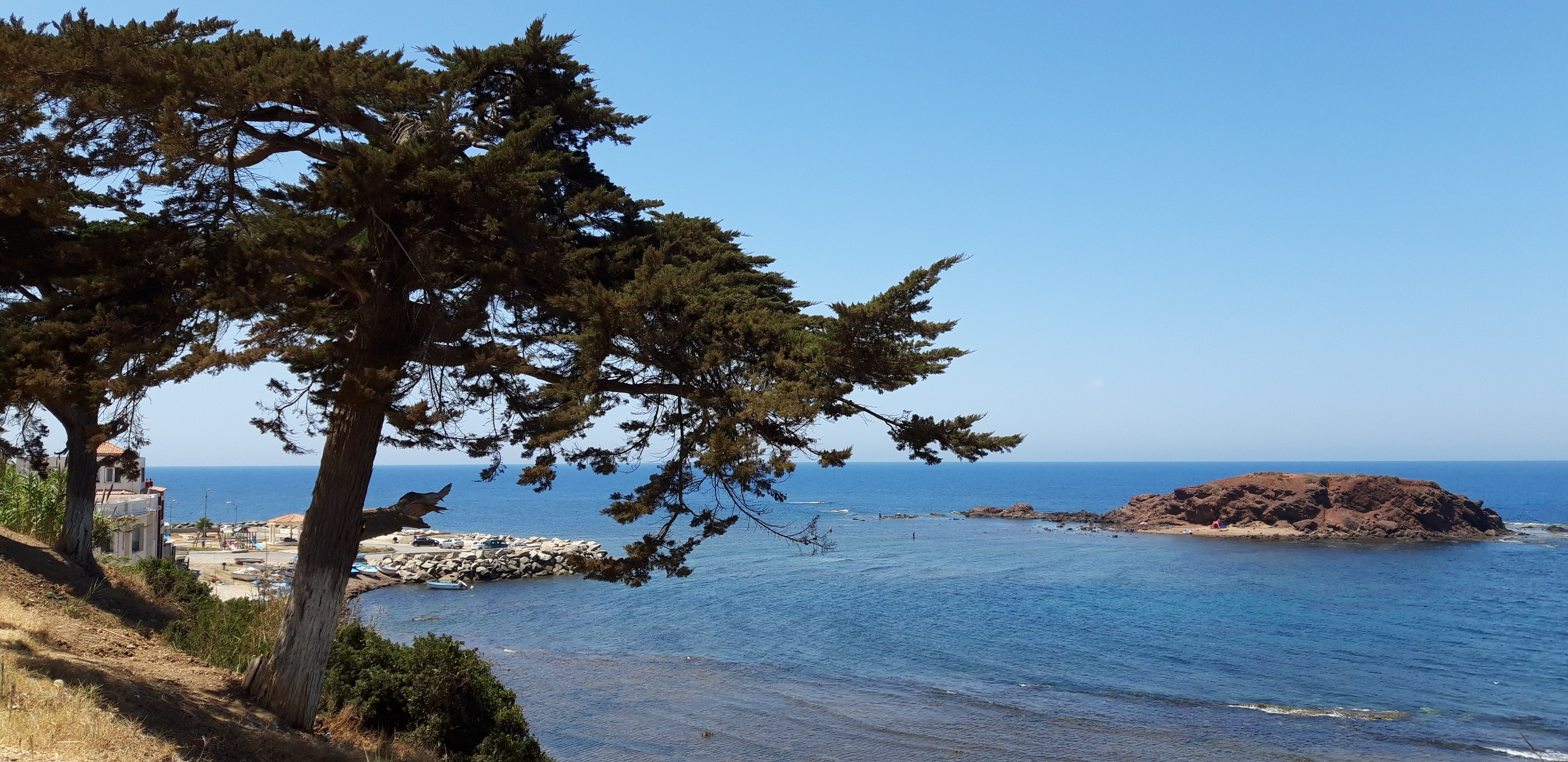

- Location of Hadjeret Wnnous within Tipaza Province
- Country: Algeria
- Province: Tipaza Province
- Time zone: UTC+1 (CET)

Hadjeret Ennous is a town and commune in Tipaza Province in northern Algeria.
