= Beni Milleuk =

Coordinates: 36°25′01″N 1°44′59″E

Beni Milleuk بني ميلك
- Commune and town
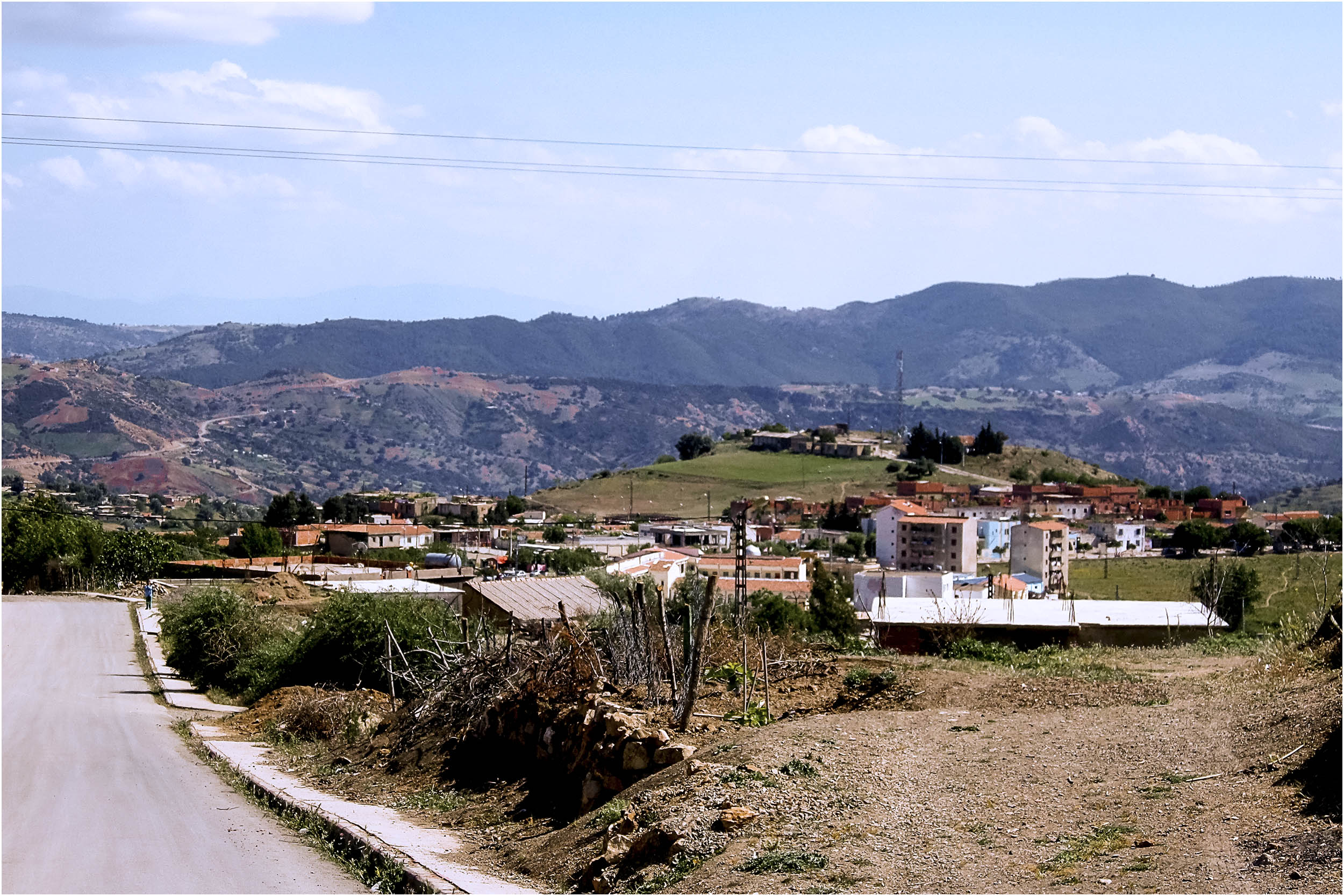

- Location of Beni Milleuk within Tipaza Province
- Country: Algeria
- Province: Tipaza Province
- Time zone: UTC+1 (CET)

Beni Milleuk or Beni Mileuk is a town and commune in Tipaza Province in northern Algeria.
