= Bouharoun =

Coordinates: 36.6234°N 2.6548°E

- Commune and town
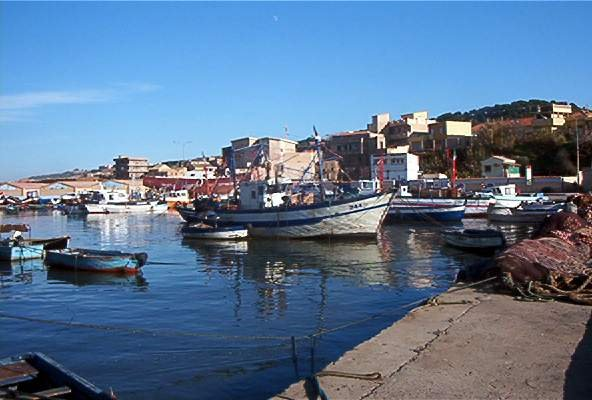

- Location of Bouharoun within Tipaza Province
- Country: Algeria
- Province: Tipaza Province
- Time zone: UTC+1 (CET)

Bouharoun is a town and commune in Tipaza Province in northern Algeria.
