= Cherchell =

Cherchell شرشال
- Town
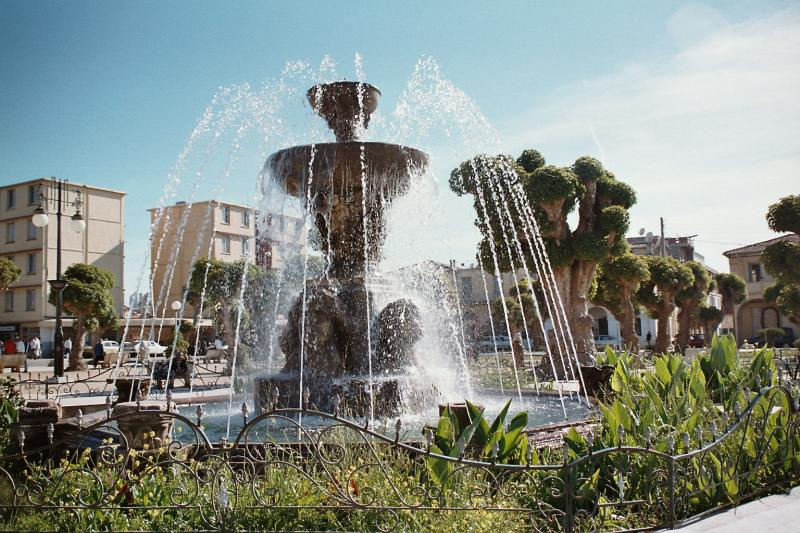
- Cherchell's fountain place

- Location of Cherchell in the Tipaza Province

- Location within Algeria
- Coordinates: 36°36′27″N 02°11′24″E
- Country: Algeria
- Province: Tipaza
- District: Cherchell

Population (2008)
  - Total: 34,372
- Fort Joinville Lighthouse; Cherchell
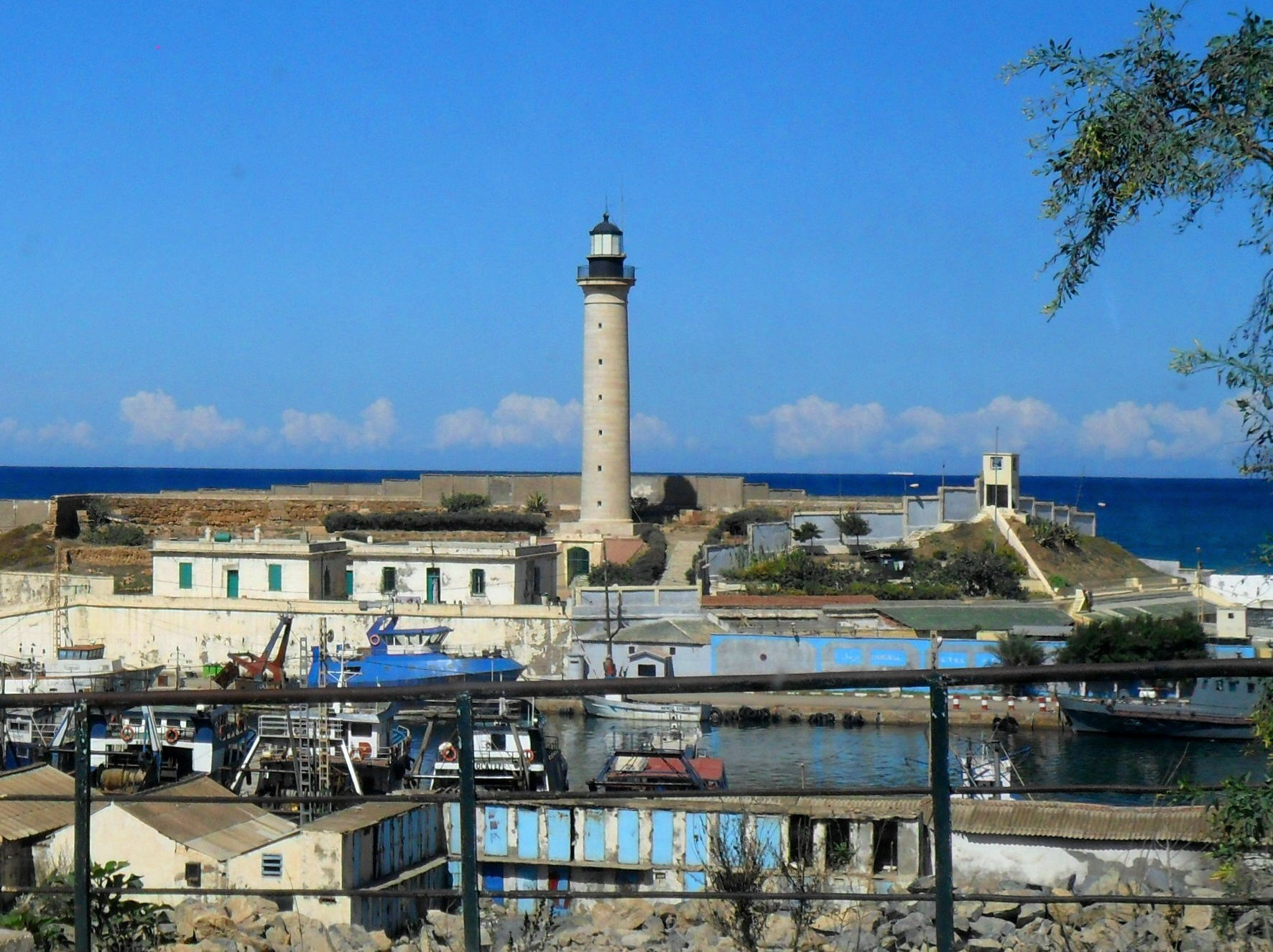
- Coordinates: 36°36′41″N 2°11′17″E
- Constructed: 1881
- Foundation: stone base
- Construction: stone tower
- Height: 28.60 metres (93.8 ft)
- Shape: cylindrical tower with balcony and lantern
- Markings: unpainted tower, black lantern
- Operator: Office Nationale de Signalisation Maritime
- Focal height: 40.10 metres (131.6 ft)
- Light source: main power
- Intensity: 1,000 W
- Range: 25 nautical miles (46 km; 29 mi)
- Characteristic: Fl (2+1) W 15s.

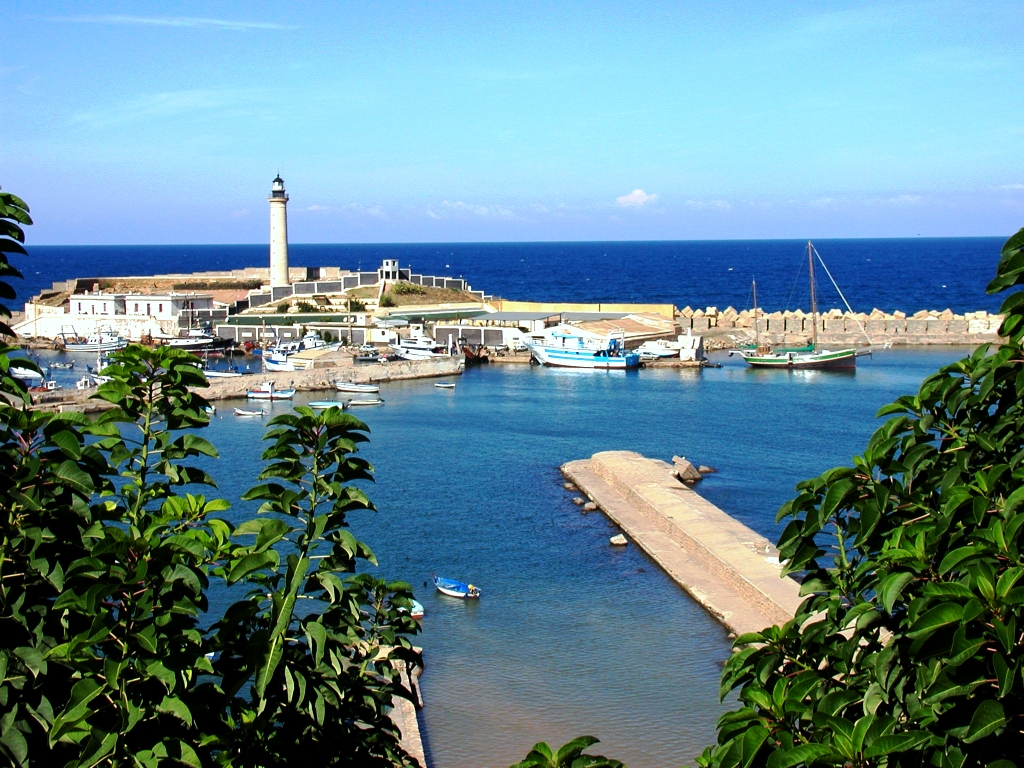
The port of Cherchell

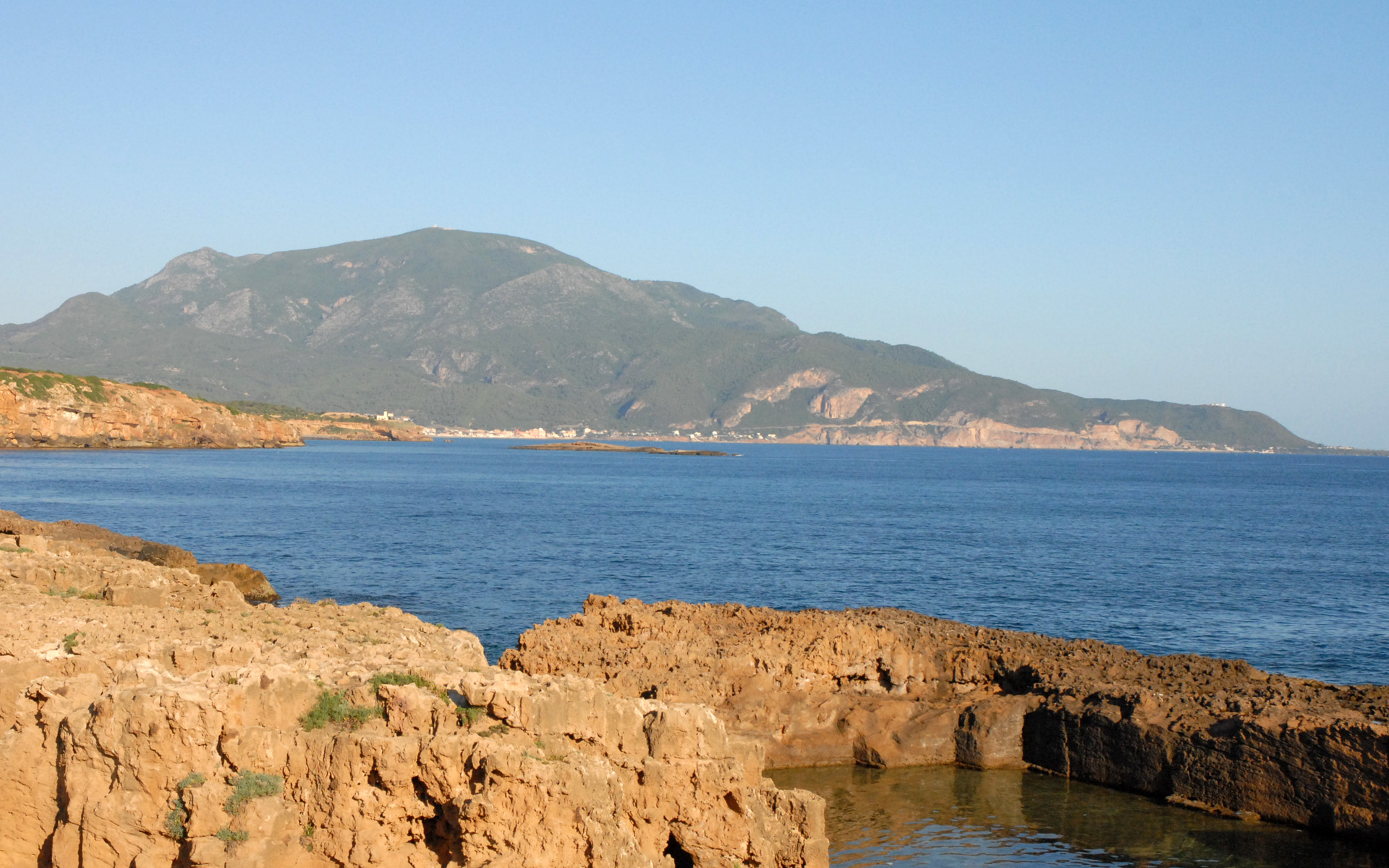
Cherchell bay with Mont Chenoua in the background

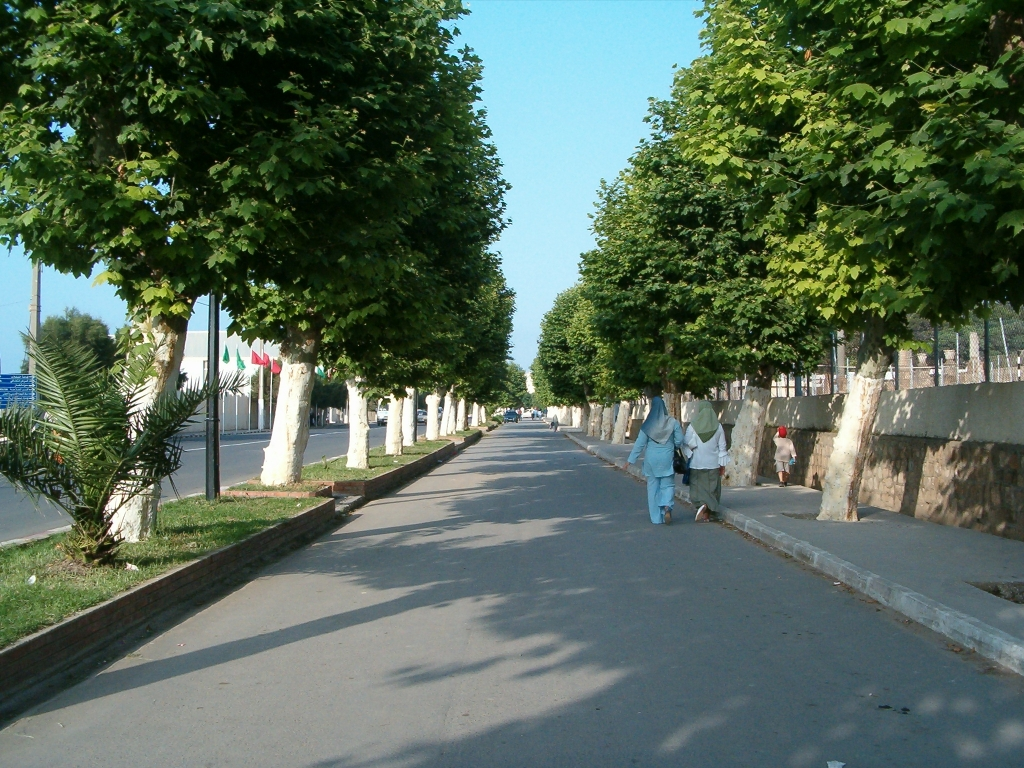
Road to the neighborhood of Tizirine

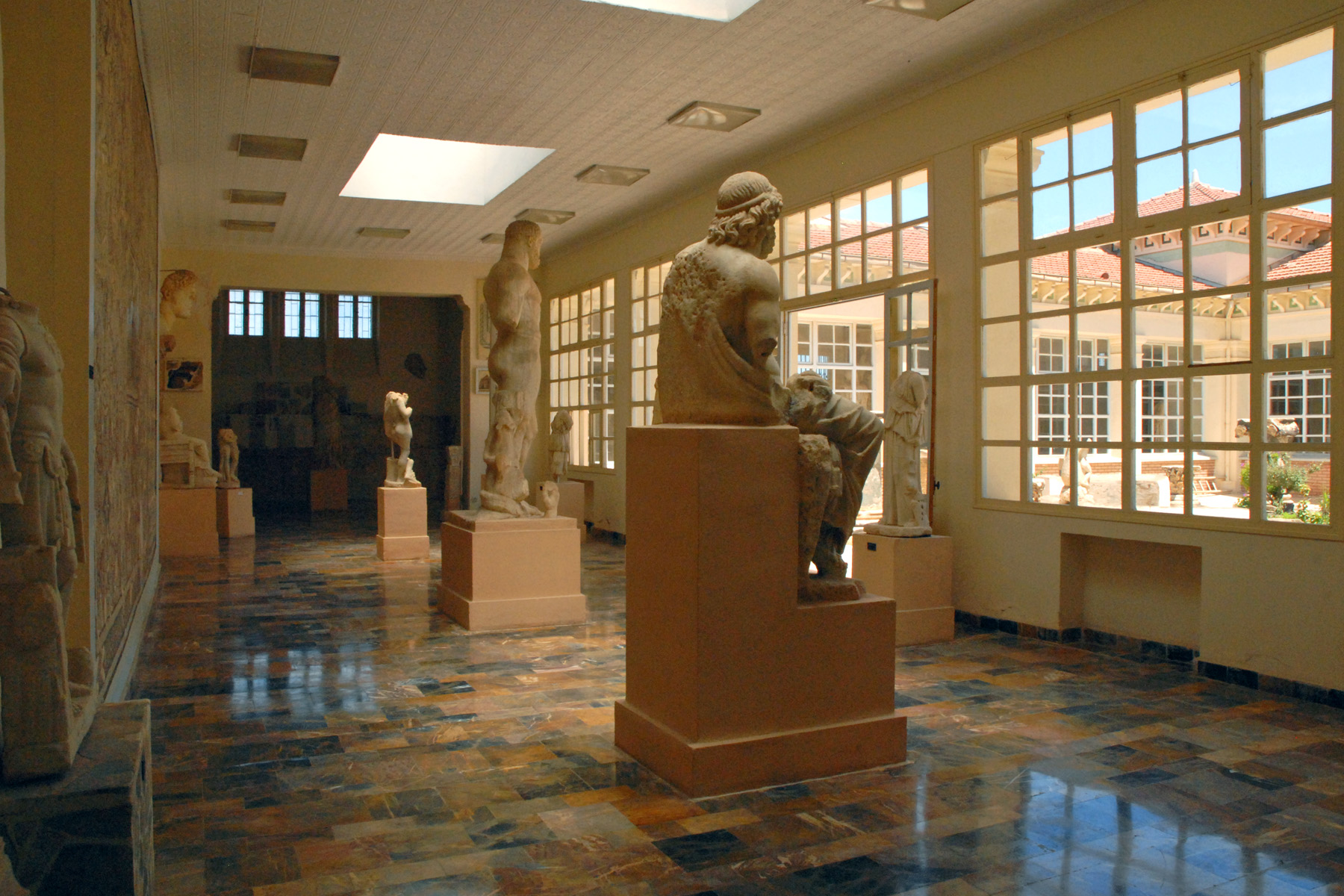
Archaeological Museum of Cherchell.

Cherchell (Arabic: شرشال) is a town on Algeria's Mediterranean coast, 89 kilometers (55 mi) west of Algiers. It is the seat of Cherchell District in Tipaza Province. Under the names Iol and Caesarea, it was formerly a Roman colony and the capital of the kingdoms of Numidia and Mauretania.

== Names ==
The town was originally known by a Phoenician and Punic name that included the element ʾy (𐤀𐤉), meaning "island". Yol is often attributed to the name of a local divinity of the sea as the word "Ilel / Yelel" in local etymology meaning sea in Tamazight This may have been ʾy-ḥol, meaning "Island of Sand". The Punic name was hellenized as Iṑl (Greek language:Ἰὼλ) and latinized as Iol. The modern name Cherchel and Cherchell are French transcriptions of the berber word Šaršār (Achercher) to signify "Waterfall".

The modern name may have derived from the town's old Latin name Caesarea (Greek language: ἡ Καισάρεια, hē Kaisáreia), the name given by the ruler Juba II to honor his benefactor Augustus, who had legally borne the name "Gaius Julius Caesar" after his posthumous adoption by Julius Caesar in 44 bc. It was later distinguished from the many other Roman towns named Caesarea by calling it Caesarea in Mauretania, Caesarea Mauretaniae ("Mauretania's Caesarea"), Iol Caesarea (Ἰὼλ Καισάρεια, Iṑl Kaisáreia), or Caesarea Iol. After its notional refounding as a Roman colony, it was formally named Colonia Claudia Caesariensium Iol after its imperial patron Claudius.

== History ==
=== Antiquity ===
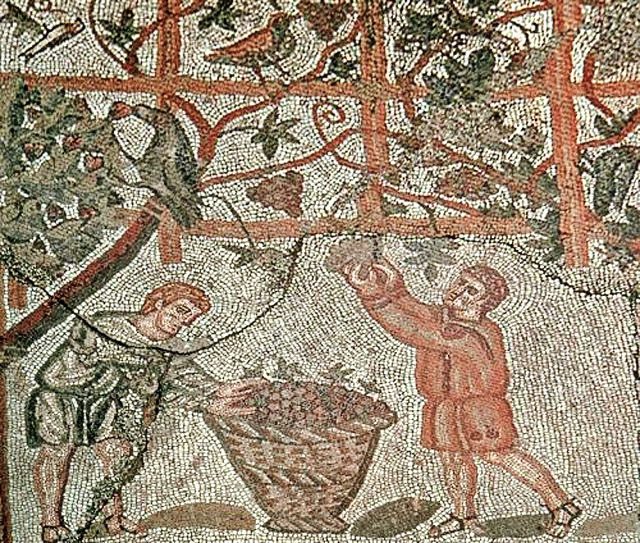
The Museum of Cherchell has many mosaics (like this one about viticulture) showing the riches of Caesarea

Phoenicians established their first major wave of colonies on the coasts between their homeland and the Strait of Gibraltar in the 8th century BC, but Iol was probably established around 600 BC and the oldest remains so far discovered at Cherchell date from the 5th century BC. By that time, Carthage had already taken control of the Phoenicians in the western Mediterranean. Punic Iol was one of the more important trading posts in what is now Algeria. In the 3rd century BC, it was fortified and began issuing Numidia's first coins in bronze and silver, bearing Punic text, Carthaginian gods, and images of local produce, particularly fish.

After the Punic Wars, Carthage's holdings in northwest Africa were mostly given to Rome's local allies. Iol was given to Micipsa, the king of Numidia, who first established it as a royal court. It became an important city for the kingdom and was the primary capital for Bocchus I and II. The town minted its own coins and received new defensive works in the 1st century BC. Its Punic culture continued, but worship of Baal Hammon was notionally substituted with worship of his Roman equivalent Saturn.

Iol was annexed directly to Rome in 33 BC. Augustus established Juba II as king of Mauretania in 25 BC, giving him the city as his capital, which Juba then renamed in his honor. Juba and his wife Cleopatra (the daughter of Mark Antony and Cleopatra of Egypt) rebuilt the city on a lavish scale, combining Roman and Hellenized Egyptian styles. The roads were relaid on a grid and amenities included a theater, an art gallery, and a lighthouse modeled after the Pharos in Alexandria. He probably began the Roman wall that ran for about 7 kilometers (4 mi) around a space of about 400 hectares (988 acres); about 150 of that total was used for the settlement in antiquity. The royal couple were buried in the Royal Mausoleum of Mauretania. The seaport capital and its kingdom flourished during this period, with most of the population being of Greek and Phoenician origin with a minority of Berbers.

Their son Ptolemy was assassinated by Caligula during a trip to Rome in AD 40. Rome proclaimed the annexation of Mauretania, which was resisted by Ptolemy's former slave Aedemon and by Berber leaders such as Sabalus. Caligula himself was murdered before Rome's response could be made, but his successor Claudius sent legions under Gn. Hosidius Geta and G. Suetonius Paulinus to complete the conquest. By 44, most resistance had been ended and the former kingdom was divided into two Roman provinces, one governed from Tingis (present-day Tangiers) and another governed from Caesarea. Mauretania Caesariensis extended along what is now the Algerian coast and included most of the hinterland as far as the Atlas Mountains.

Roman colonies of veteran soldiers were established in the new provinces to maintain order. Caesarea itself was made a colony, with its residents gaining Roman citizenship. It prospered as a provincial capital during the 1st and 2nd centuries, reaching a population of over 20,000 and possibly as many as 30,000. It was defended by auxiliary units and was the harbor of Rome's Mauretanian Fleet, which was established as a permanent force after Berber raids in the early 170s. The city featured a hippodrome, amphitheater, numerous temples, and civic buildings like a basilica. It was surrounded by suburban villas whose agricultural mosaics are now celebrated. It had its own school of philosophy, academy, and library. It received a new forum and further patronage from the African emperor Septimius Severus and his dynasty, possibly reaching as many as 100,000 inhabitants. Its native son Macrinus and his son Diadumenian became the first Berber and lower-class emperors, reigning in 217 and 218. (Their predecessor's wastefulness and wars required unpopular financial adjustments that led to their overthrow in favor of Elagabalus.) Juba's theater was converted into an amphitheater sometime after the year 300.

The city was sacked by a Berber revolt in 371 and 372. It largely recovered, but was ravaged again by the Vandals after they were invited into Roman North Africa by Count Boniface in 429. Parts of the town received new fortifications. After the Vandal Kingdom conquered Carthage in 439, they also acquired a large part of Rome's Mediterranean fleet which they used to carry out raids all over the sea. Caesarea's port was sometimes used as a base for these raiders, and the city prospered from their plunder. Its schools produced the famous grammarian Priscian, who emigrated to the Byzantine east.

=== Middle Ages ===
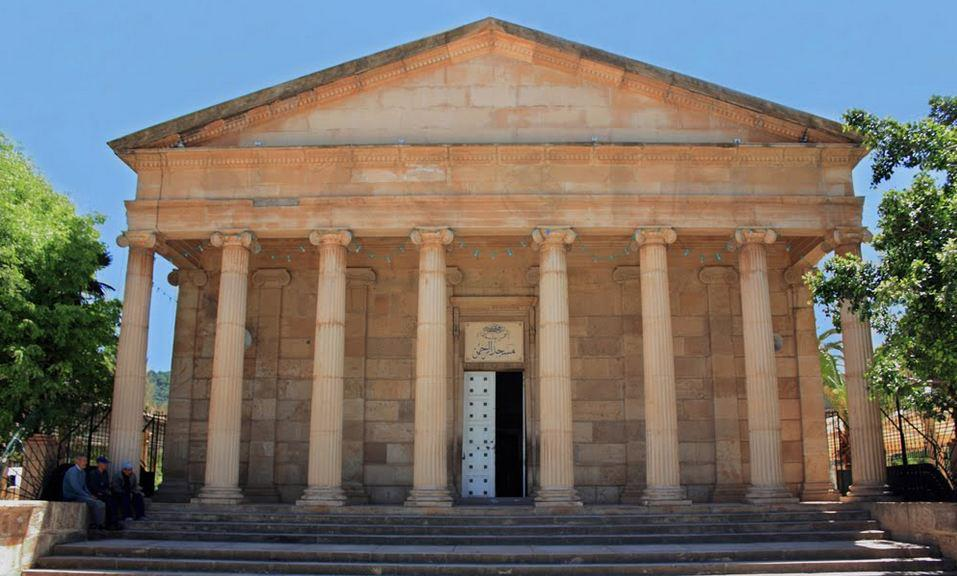
El Rahman Mosque in Cherchell, built as a Christian church during the French colonial years, adapting a Roman pagan temple in the forum of Caesarea, later used for Christian worship

In 533, the Vandal Kingdom was conquered by Byzantine forces under Justinian's general Belisarius. Caesarea was among the areas to return to imperial rule. It was the seat of Mauretania's duke (Latin: dux), but it went into decline and its city center was given over to ramshackle housing for the poor. The first duke was named John; that he was given an infantry unit rather than cavalry implies that he was meant to hold the port without much concern about controlling its surrounding hinterland.

The town remained under Byzantine control until its Muslim conquest in the late 7th century. Successive waves of Umayyad attacks into Byzantine North African territory over 15 years wore down the smaller and less motivated imperial forces, until finally Umayyad troops laid siege to the city of Caesarea and, although the defenders were resupplied by Byzantine fleets, finally overwhelmed it. Much of the Byzantine nobility and officials fled to other parts of the Empire, while most of the remaining Roman and semi-Roman Berber population accepted Islamic rule which granted them protected status.

Some remained Christians. For two generations what remained of the Roman population and Romanized Berbers launched several revolts often in conjunction with reinforcements from the Empire. As a result, by the ninth century down much of the city's defences were damaged beyond repair, and resulting in its political loss of importance, leaving the former city little more than a small village.

For the following few centuries, the city remained a power center of Arabs and Berbers with a small but significant population of Christians who were fully assimilated by the beginning of the Early Modern period. Similarly, by the 10th century the city's name had transformed in the local dialect from a Latin to a Berber and ultimately into the Arabised form Sharshal (in French orthography, Cherchell).

The Norman Kingdom of Africa raided Berreshk, near Cherchell, in 1144.

=== Modernity ===
Eventually, Ottoman Turks managed to successfully reconquer the city from Spanish occupation in the 16th century, using the city primarily as a fortified port. In 1520, Hayreddin Barbarossa captured the town and annexed the Algerian Pashalic. His elder brother Oruç Reis built a fort over the town. Under Turkish occupation, the city's importance as a port and fort led to it being inhabited by Moslems of many nationalities, some engaging in privateering and piracy on the Mediterranean.

In reply, European navies and especially the French Navy and the Knights Hospitaller (self-proclaimed descendants of the Crusaders) laid siege to the city and occasionally captured it for limited periods of time. For a century in the 1600s and for a brief period in the 1700s the city either was under Spanish or Hospitallar control. During this period a number of palaces were built, but the overwhelming edifice of Hayreddin Barbarossa's citadel, was considered too militarily valuable to destroy and uncover the previous ancient buildings of old Caesarea.

After the end of the Napoleonic Wars and Revolutions of the early 19th century, the French under both British, American, and other European powers were encouraged to attack and destroy the Barbary Pirates. From 1836 to 1840 various allied navies, but mostly French hunted down the Barbary pirates and conquered the Barbary ports while threatening the Ottoman Empire with war if it intervened. In 1840, the French after a significant siege captured and occupied the town. The French lynched the Barbary Pirates including the local pasha for Crimes against the laws of nations.

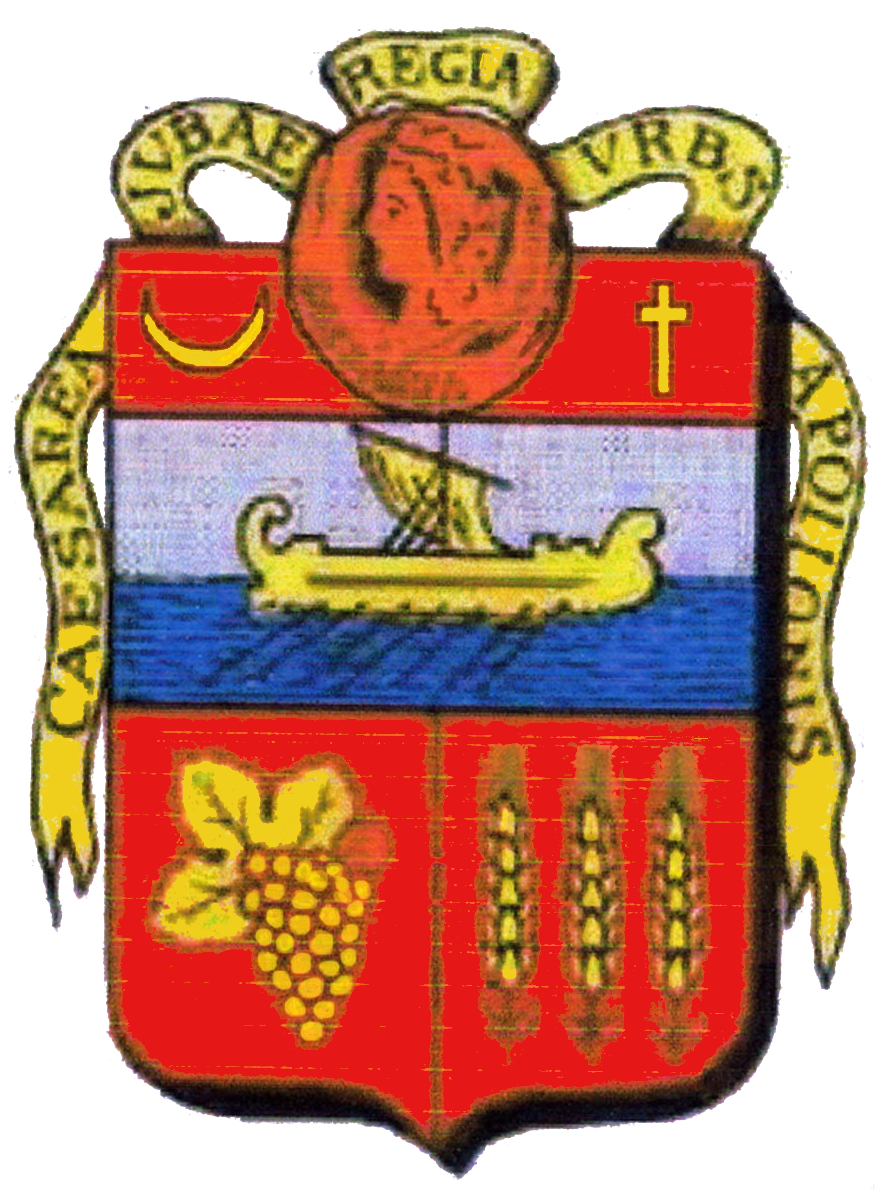
Coat of arms of French Cherchell

In turn, many ancient statues and buildings were either restored and left in Cherchell, or taken to museums in Algiers or Paris, for further study. However, not all building projects were successful in uncovering and restoring the ancient town. The Roman amphitheatre was considered mostly unsalvageable and unnecessary to rebuild. Its dress stones were used to the build a new French fort and barracks. Materials from the Hippodrome were used to build a new church. The steps of the Hippodrome were partly destroyed by Cardinal Charles Lavigerie in a search for the tomb of Saint Marciana.

French occupation also brought new European settlement, to join the city's long-established communities of semi-Arabized Christians of local origin and old European merchant families, in addition to Berbers and Arab Muslims. Under French rule, European and Christians became a majority of the population again until World War II.

In the immediate years before World War II, losses to the French national population from World War I, and a declining birthrate in general among Europeans kept further colonial settlement to a trickle. Arab and Berber populations started seeing an increase in growth. French-Algerian colonial officials and landowners encouraged larger numbers of surrounding Berber tribesmen to move into the surrounding region to work the farms and groves cheaply. In turn, more and more Berbers and Arabs moved into the city seeking employment. By 1930 the combined Berbo-Arab Algerian population represented nearly 40% of the city's population.

The changing demographics within the city were disguised by the large numbers of French military personnel based there and the numbers of European tourists visiting what had become known as the Algerian Riviera. Additionally, during World War II, Cherchell, with its libraries, cafes, restaurants, and hotels served as a base for the United States Army and Allied War effort, hosting a summit conference between the US and UK in October 1942.

The end of the war with its departure of Allied forces and a reduction of French naval personnel due to rebasing saw an actual decline in Europeans living in the city. Additionally, the general austerity of the post-war years dried up the tourism industry and caused financial stagnation and losses to the local Franco-Algerian community. In 1952, a census recorded that the Frenco-Algerian population had declined to 50% of the population.

For the remaining 1950s, Cherchell was only slightly caught up by the Algerian War of Independence. With its large proportion of Europeans, French control and influence was strong enough to discourage all but the most daring attacks by anti-French insurgents. By 1966, after independence from the French, Cherchell had lost nearly half of its population and all of its Franco-Algerian population.

=== Independent Algeria ===
Cherchell has continued to grow post-independence, recovering to peak colonial-era population by the 1980s. Cherchell currently has industries in marble, plaster quarries and iron mines. The town trades in oils, tobacco and earthenware. Additionally, the ancient cistern first developed by Juba and Cleopatra Selene II was restored and expanded under recent French rule and still supplies water to the town.

Although the Algerian Riviera ended with the war, Cherchell is still a popular tourist place in Algeria. Cherchell has various splendid temples and monuments from the Punic, Numidian and Roman periods, and the works of art found there, including statues of Neptune and Venus, are now in the Museum of Antiquities in Algiers. The former Roman port is no longer in commercial use and has been partly filled by alluvial deposits and has been affected by earthquakes. The former local mosque of the Hundred Columns contains 89 columns of diorite. This remarkable building now serves as a hospital. The local museum displays some of the finest ancient Greek and Roman antiquities found in Africa. Cherchell is the birthplace of writer and movie director Assia Djebar.

=== Historical population ===
| Year | Population |
|---|---|
| 1901 | 9,000 |
| 1926 | 11,900 |
| 1931 | 12,700 |
| 1936 | 12,700 |
| 1954 | 16,900 |
| 1966 | 11,700 |
| 1987 | 18,700 |
| 1998 | 24,400 |
| 2015 | 30,000 |

== Remains ==
Earthquakes, wars and plunder have ravaged many of the ancient remains.

The town (of Caesarea) remains insufficiently known....The town walls, studied in 1946, pose more problems; and the monuments are more often simply marked than completely known. The amphitheater, which has been excavated, remains unpublished; the very large hippodrome, which appears clearly on aerial photographs, is known only through old borings. The temples, which have been found on a spur of the mountain to the East of the central esplanade, on the edge of the route from Ténès to the West of the modern town, are too much destroyed to warrant publication even of plans. The baths along the edge of the sea, rather majestic, are also badly preserved. One would scarcely recognize several houses recently excavated. Grouped around peristyles with vast trichinia, they are readily adapted to the terrain and are constructed on terraces on the lower slopes or on the edge of cliffs with views over the sea. They often are preserved for us only in a late form—4th c. A.D.—and traces of the era of Juba are found only in the lower strata. The theater is an exception; still well preserved in 1840, it has since served as a quarry. It was set against the slope of the mountain. At the back of the scaena towards the N was a portico, covered over today by a street, where Gsell saw the S side of the forum. Of the rich scaenae frons there remain only traces and several statues, of which two are colossal muses. The orchestra had later undergone great modification which had resulted in the disappearance of the platform of the stage: an oval arena had been built, intended for hunting spectacles, and a wall was raised between the first row of seats and the cavea to protect spectators from the wild beasts. The sumptuously decorated monument is consequently very much mutilated, but is of interest specifically because of its complex history. The amphitheater, in the E part of the town, was erected in flat open country. It was not oval but rectangular, with the short sides rounded. The tiers of seats, for the most part missing, were carried on ramping vaults, and the arena floor was cut by two perpendicular passages intended for beasts. It is in this arena that St. Marciana was martyred.

Some remains can be seen in the local Archeological Museum of Chercell-Caesarea.

== Religion ==
Christianity arrived in Caesarea early enough to produce martyrs during the Diocletianic Persecution. For vandalizing an idol of Diana, St Marciana was supposedly tortured and killed in Caesarea's arena, gored by a bull and mauled by a leopard for the amusement of the crowd. St Theodota and her sons were also supposedly martyred in the city.

Caesarea was a bishopric from about 314 to 484, although not all of its bishops are known. Fortunatus took part in the 314 Council of Arles, which condemned Donatism. Clemens was mentioned in one of Symmachus's letters and would have served in the 370s. During the 411 synod at Carthage, Caesarea was represented by the Donatist Emeritus and the orthodox Deuterius. St Augustine accosted Emeritus at Caesarea in the autumn of 418 and secured his exile. Apocorius was an orthodox bishop whom Huneric summoned to Carthage in 484 and then exiled. An early 8th-century Notitia Episcopatuum still included this see.

Caesarea was revived by the Roman Catholic Church as a titular see in the 19th century. It was distinguished as "Caesarea in Mauretania" in 1933. Its bishops have included:

- Titular Bishop Biagio Pisani (1897.04.23 – 1901.06.07)
- Titular Bishop Pietro Maffi (1902.06.09 – 1903.06.22)
- Titular Bishop Thomas Francis Brennan (1905.10.07 – 1916.03.20)
- Titular Archbishop Pierre-Célestin Cézerac (1918.01.02 – 1918.03.18)
- Titular Archbishop Cardinal Wilhelmus Marinus van Rossum, CSSR (1918.04.25 – 1918.05.20)
- Titular Archbishop Benedetto Aloisi Masella (1919.12.15 – 1946.02.18)
- Titular Bishop Luigi Cammarata (1946.12.04 – 1950.02.25)
- Titular Bishop Francesco Pennisi (1950.07.11 – 1955.10.01)
- Titular Bishop André-Jacques Fougerat (1956.07.16 – 1957.01.05)
- Titular Bishop Carmelo Canzonieri (1957.03.11 – 1963.07.30)
- Titular Bishop Archbishop Enea Selis (1964.01.18 – 1971.09.02)
- Titular Bishop Giuseppe Moizo (1972.01.22 – 1976.07.01)
- Titular Archbishop Sergio Sebastiani (1976.09.27 – 2001.02.21)
- Titular Bishop Gerard Johannes Nicolaas de Korte (2001.04.11 – 2008.06.18)
- Titular Bishop Stanislaus Tobias Magombo (2009.04.29 – 2010.07.06)
- Titular Archbishop Walter Brandmüller (2010.11.04 – 2010.11.20)
- Titular Archbishop Marek Solczyński (2011.11.26 – present)

== Gallery ==
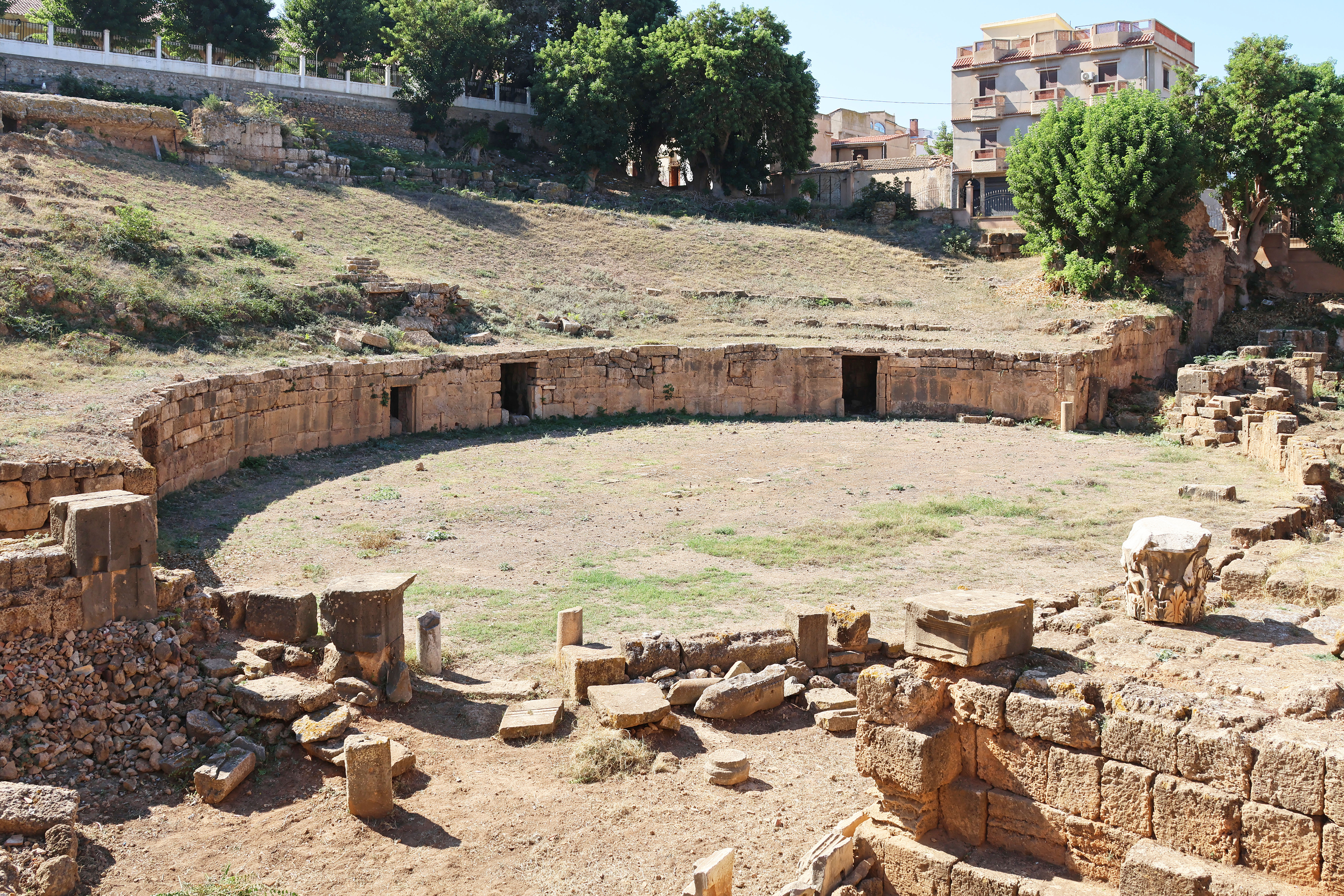
Roman theater

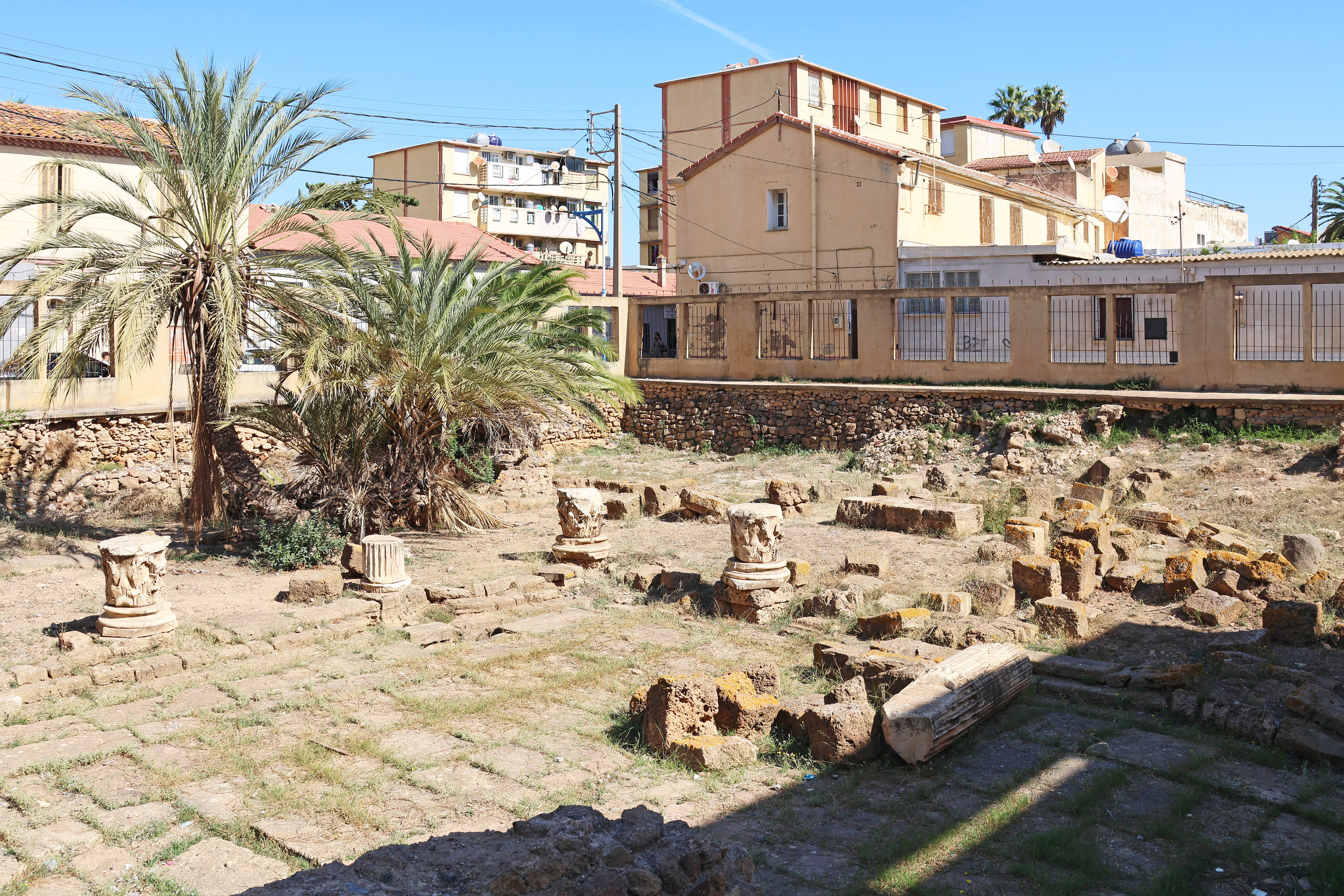
Ancient Roman forum

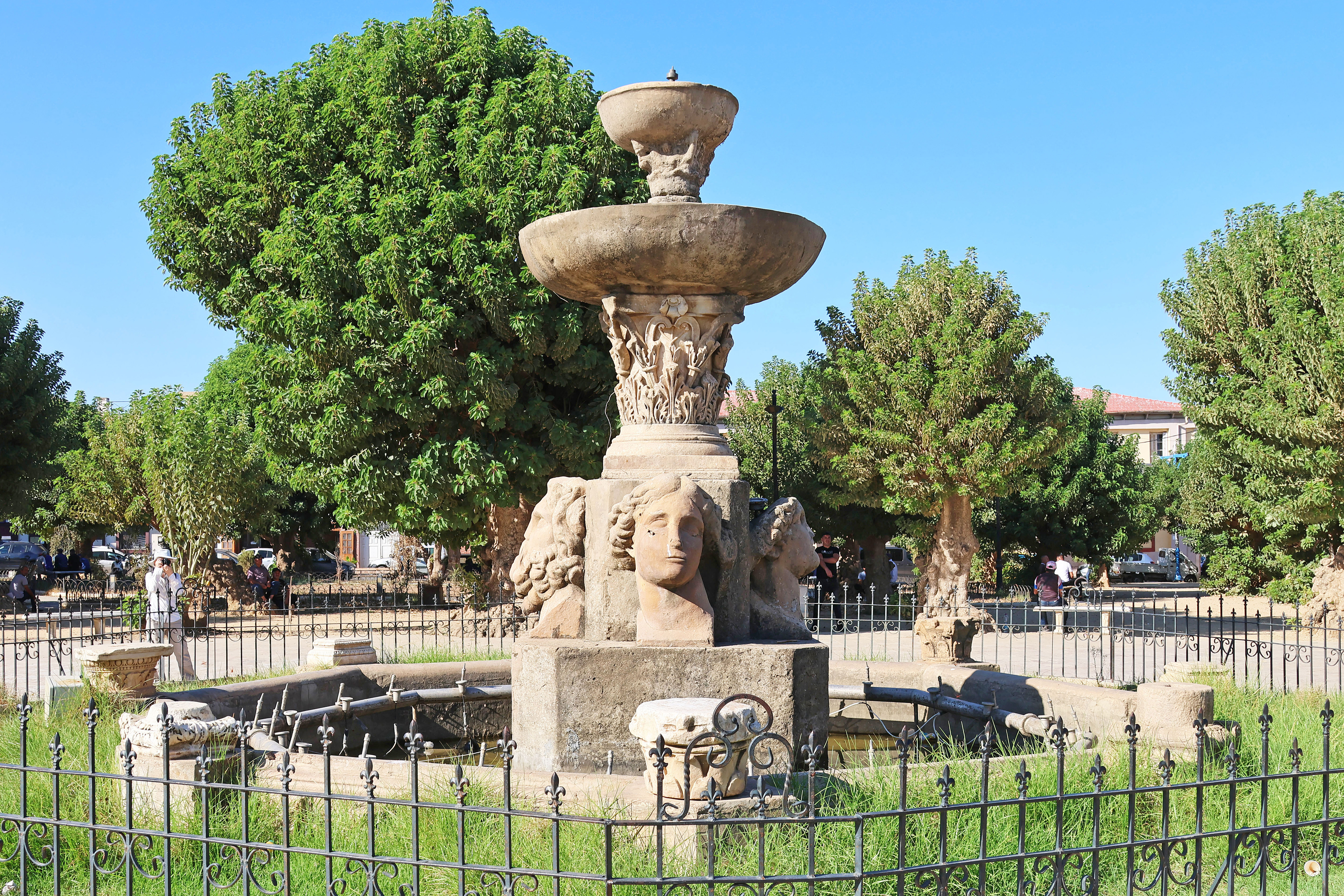
Ancient Roman fountain

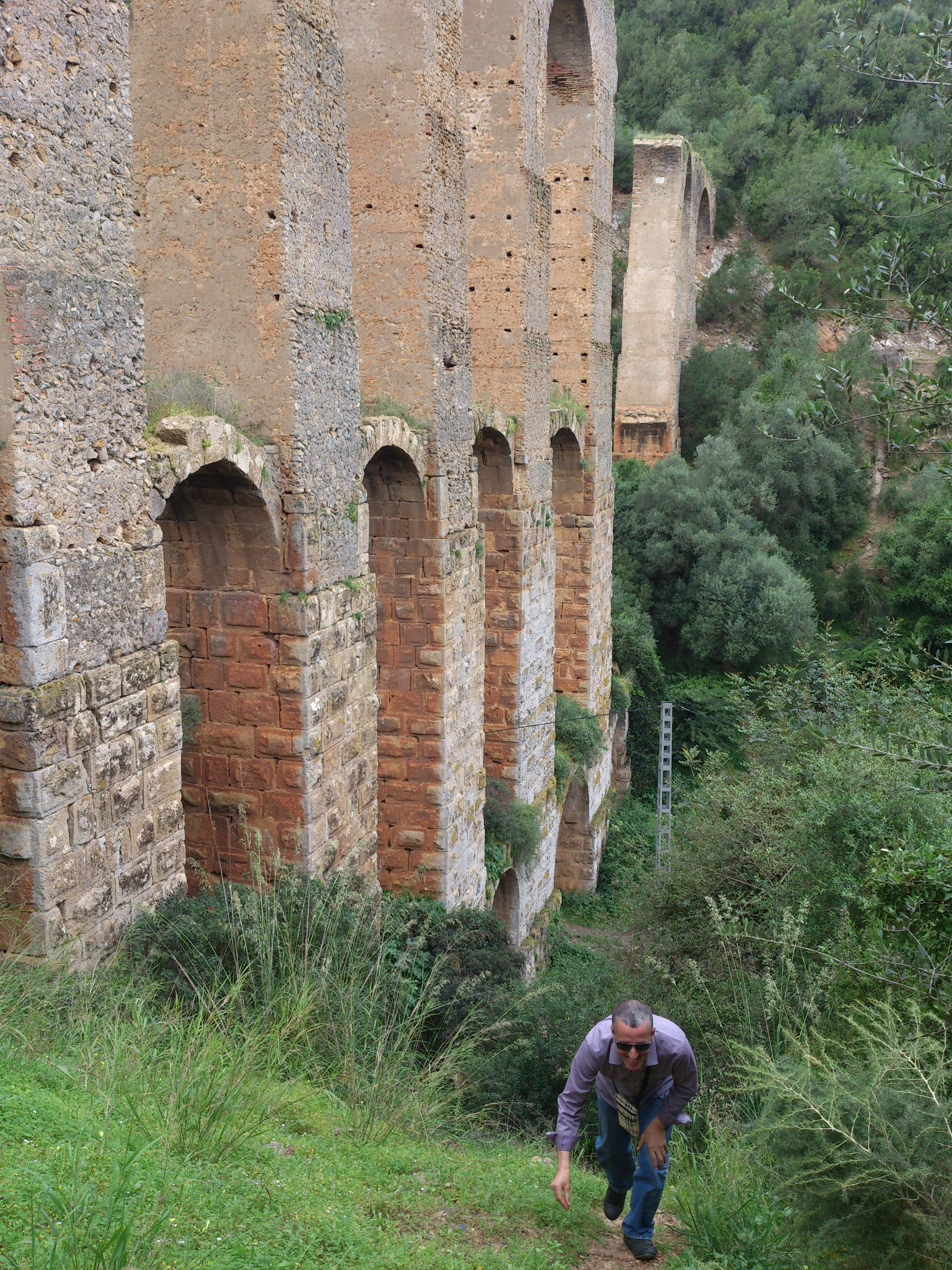
Section of Caesarea's Roman aqueduct

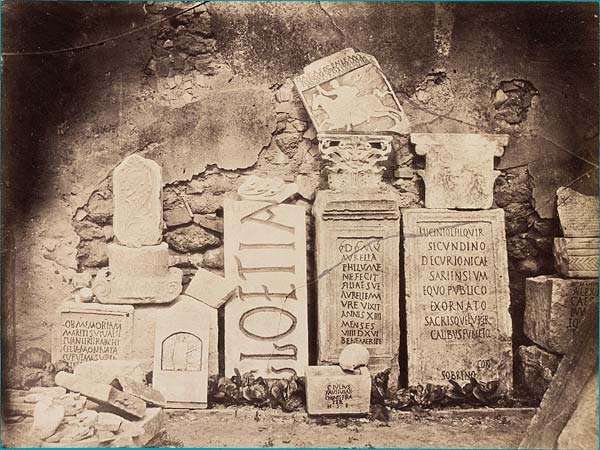
Photography of ancient Roman inscriptions from Cherchell, 1856

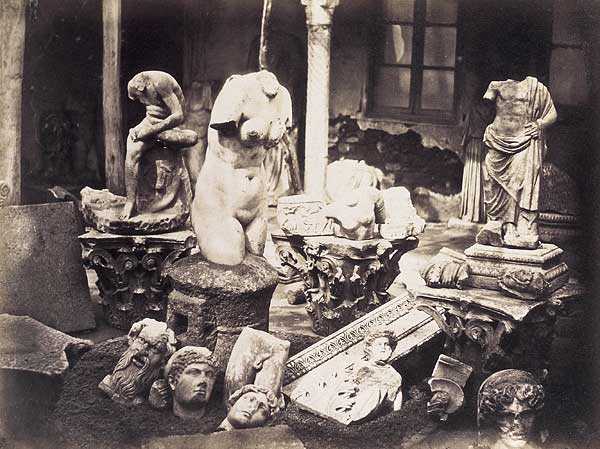
Photography of Roman remains from Caesarea, 1856

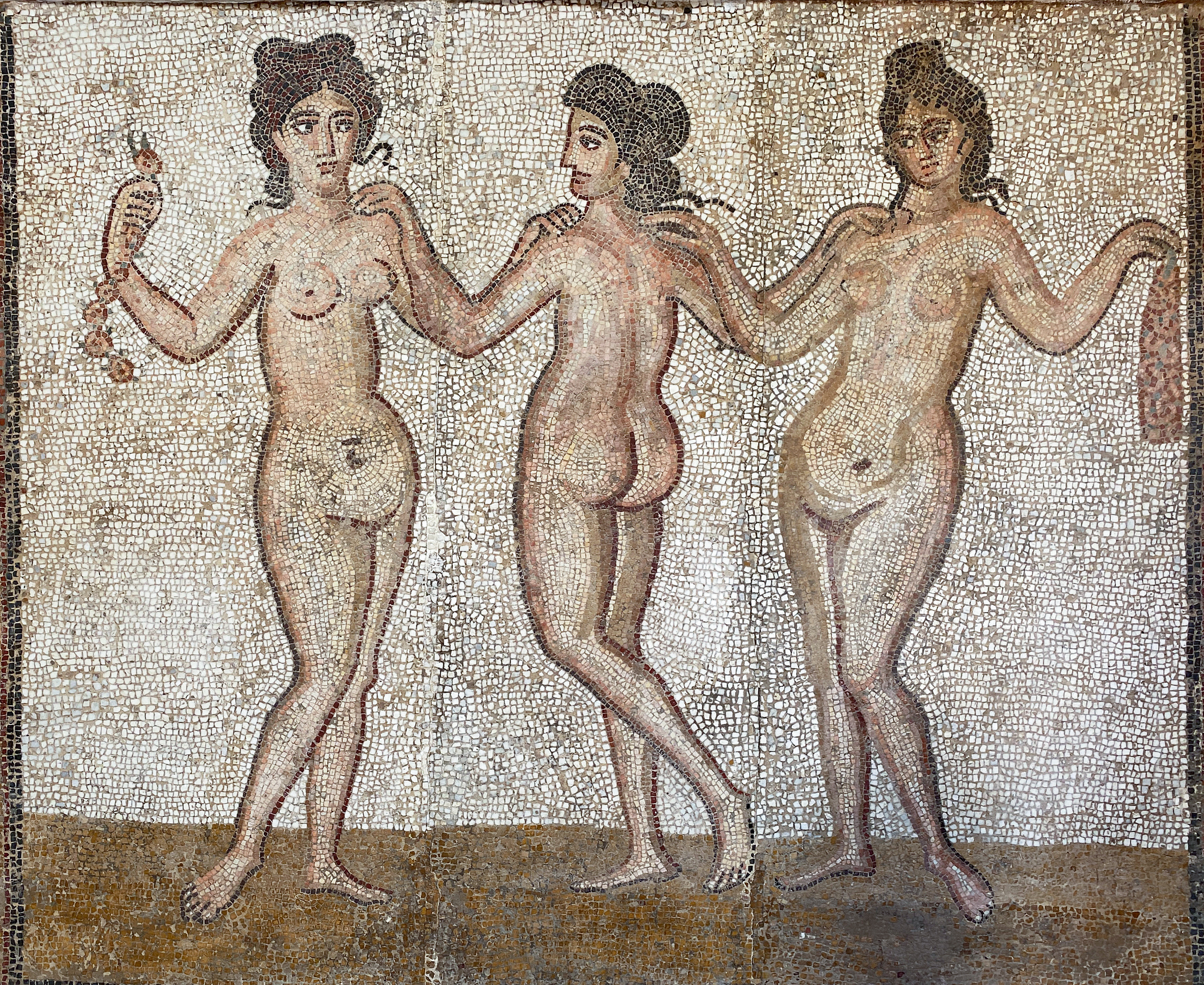
Mosaic of the Three Graces from Caesarea

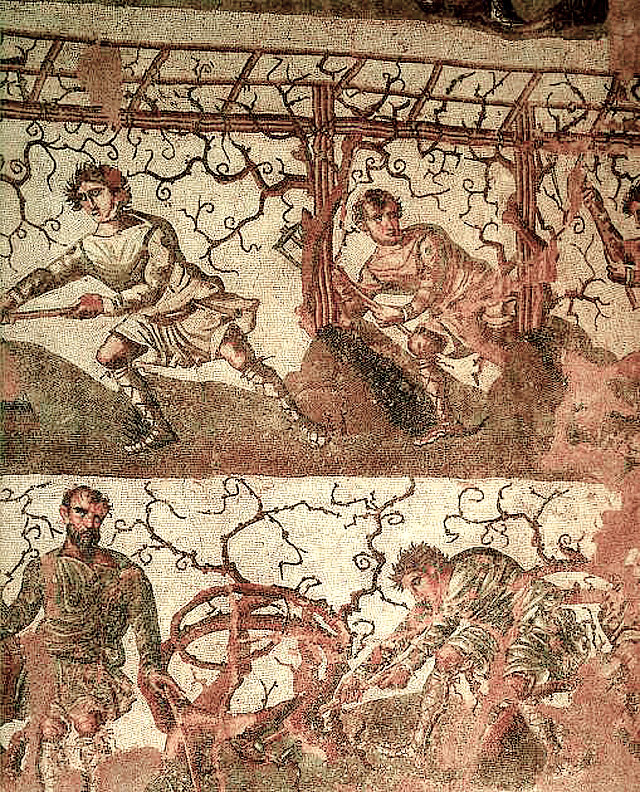
Mosaic of vineyard workers

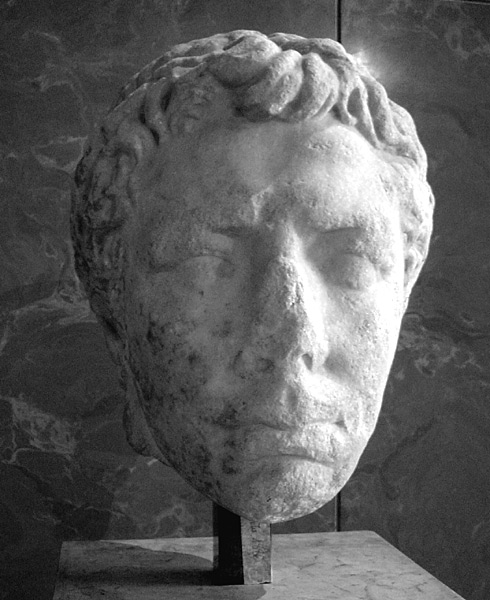
Portrait of Juba II, found in Caesarea

== See also ==
- List of lighthouses in Algeria
