= Aghbal =

Coordinates: 36°29′31″N 1°50′21″E

- Commune and town
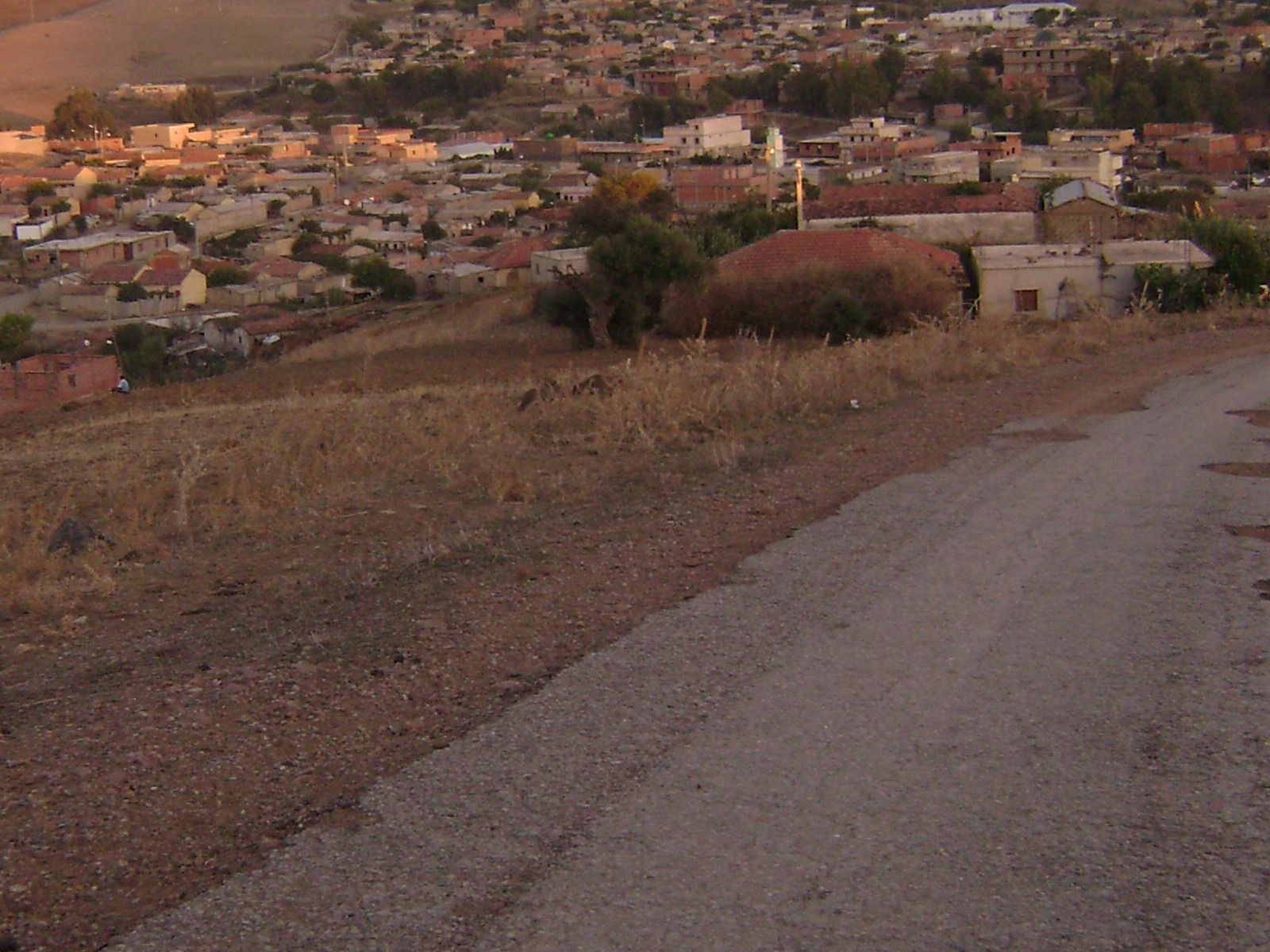

- Location of Aghbal within Tipaza Province
- Country: Algeria
- Province: Tipaza Province
- Time zone: UTC+1 (CET)

Aghbal is a town and commune in Tipaza Province in northern Algeria.
