= Khemisti, Tipaza =

Coordinates: 36°37′33″N 2°40′51″E

Khemisti
- Commune and town
- Location of Khemisti within Tipaza Province
- Country: Algeria
- Province: Tipaza Province
- Time zone: UTC+1 (CET)

Khemisti is a town and commune in Tipaza Province in northern Algeria.
