= Messelmoun =

Coordinates: 36°34′N 2°00′E

- Commune and town
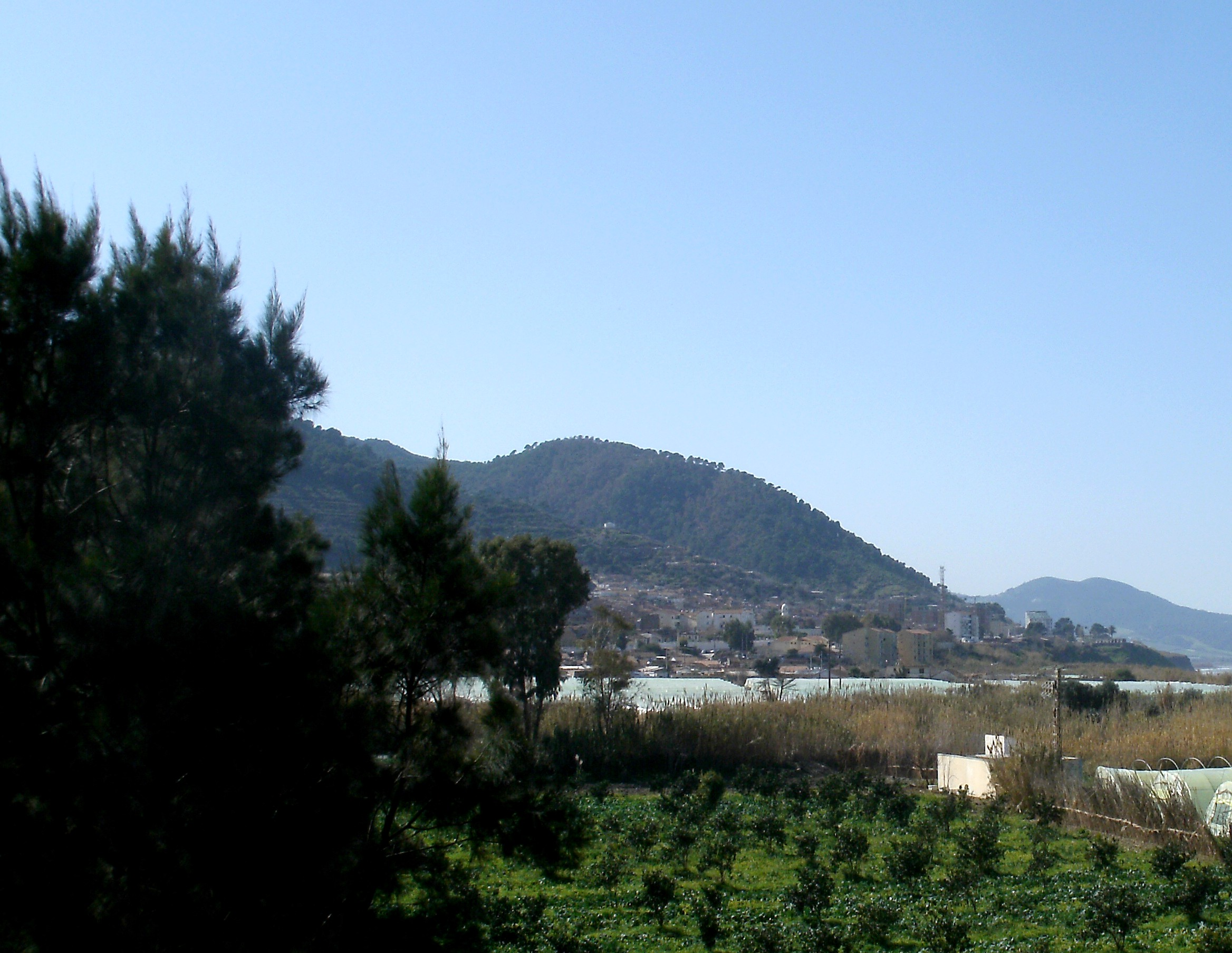

- Location of Messelmoun within Tipaza Province
- Country: Algeria
- Province: Tipaza Province
- Time zone: UTC+1 (CET)

Messelmoun is a town and commune in Tipaza Province in northern Algeria.
