= Attatba =

Coordinates: 36°34′24″N 2°40′31″E

Attatba الحطاطبة
- Commune and town
- Location of Attatba within Tipaza Province
- Country: Algeria
- Province: Tipaza Province
- Time zone: UTC+1 (CET)

Attatba is a town and commune in Tipaza Province in northern Algeria.
