= Meurad =

Coordinates: 36°28′N 2°26′E

Merad مراد Meurad
- Commune and town
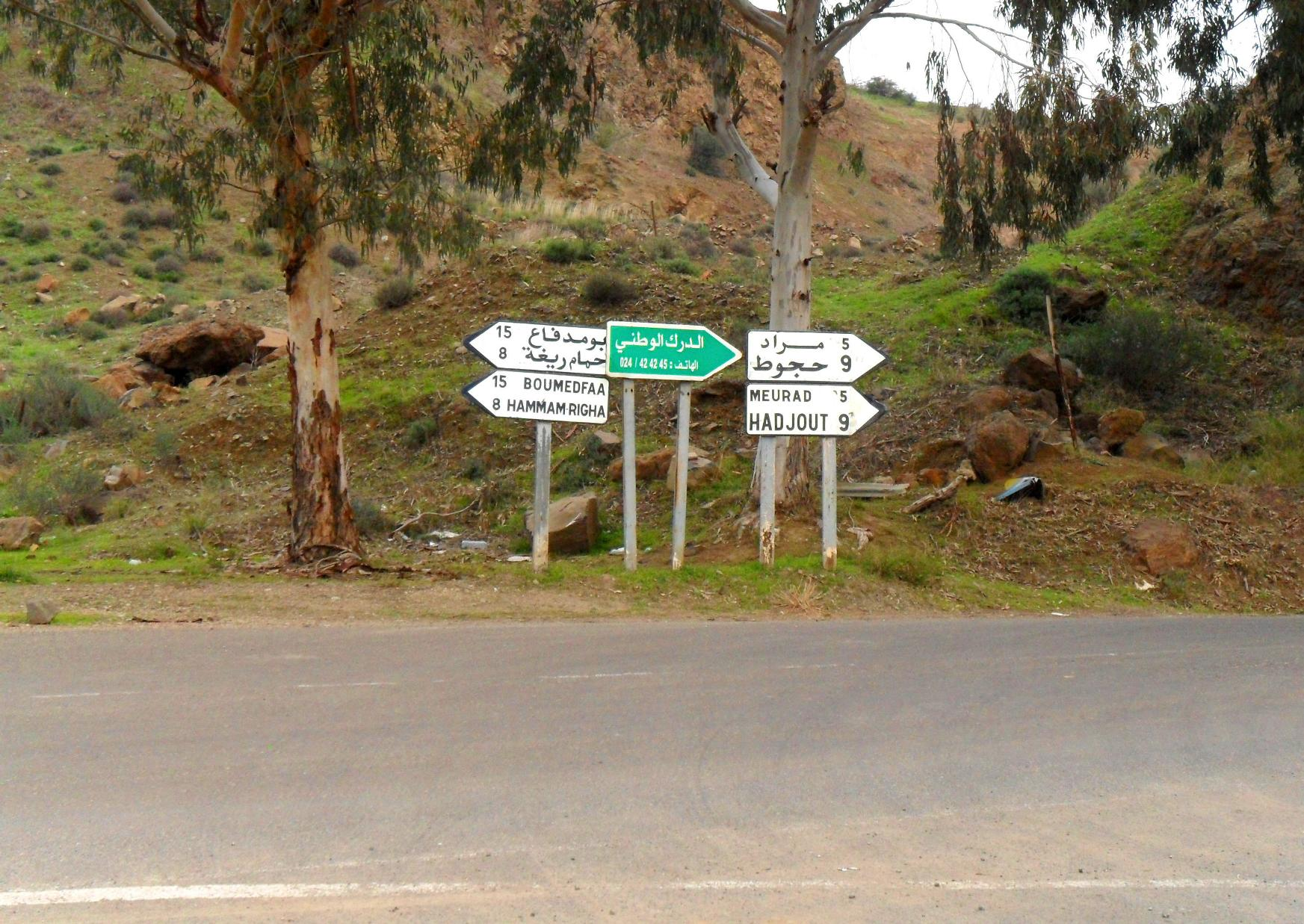
- Border of Meurad and Hamame Righa districts

- Location of Meurad within Tipaza Province
- Country: Algeria
- Province: Tipaza Province

Population (1998)
  - Total: 19,916
- Time zone: UTC+1 (CET)

Meurad is a town and commune in Tipaza Province in northern Algeria.

The village of Meurad was erected as a commune by decree of 19 April 1888, with the douars Sahel and Beni Merit. The territory of the municipality of Merad is located to the south of the wilaya of Tipaza, about 15 km south of Tipaza.

The municipality remained in the department of Algiers in 1956 and took the name of Merad in 1962.
