= Sidi Amar, Tipaza =

Coordinates: 36°32′33″N 2°18′23″E

Sidi Amar
- Commune and town
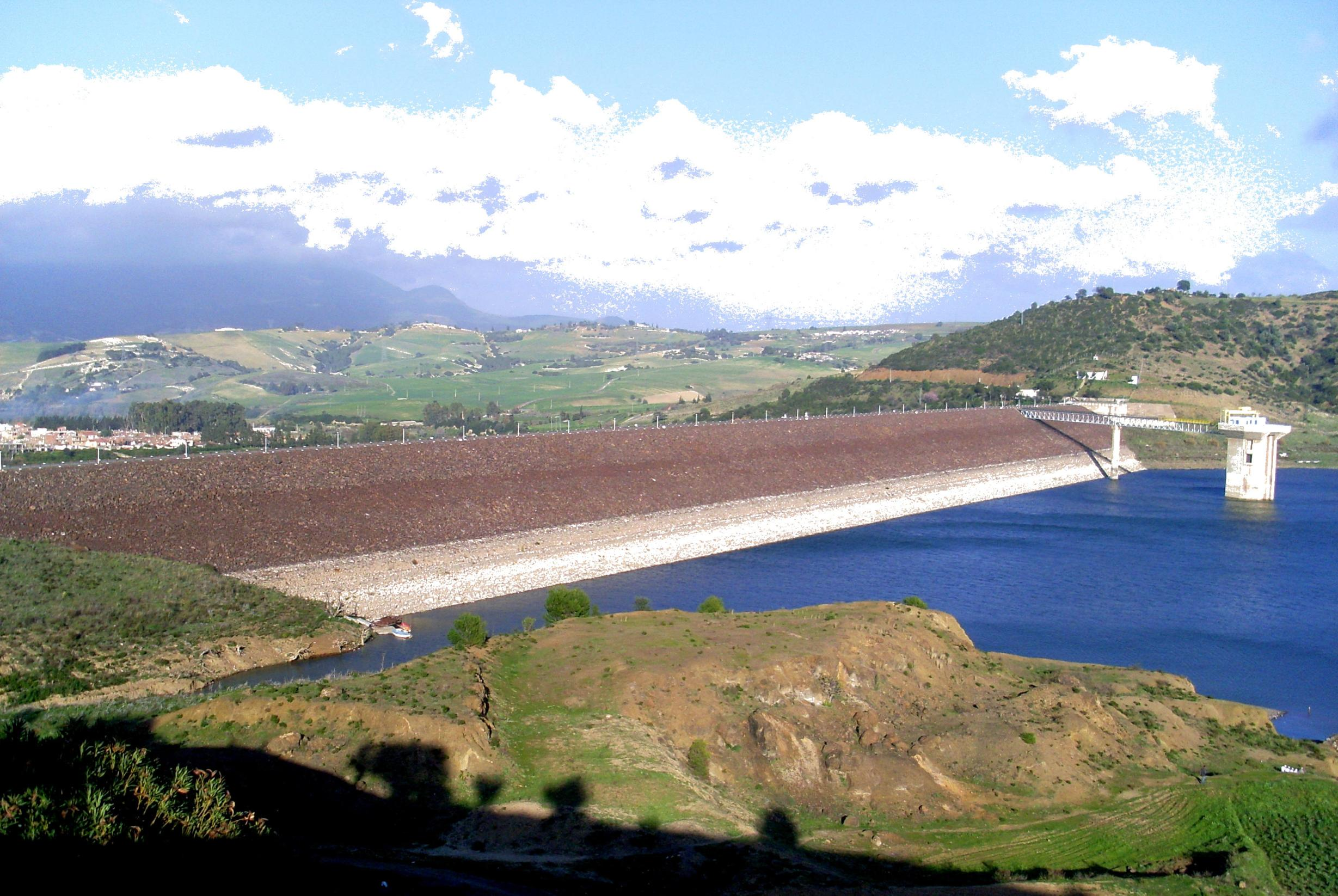

- Location of Sidi Amar within Tipaza Province
- Country: Algeria
- Province: Tipaza Province
- Time zone: UTC+1 (CET)

Sidi Amar is a town and commune in Tipaza Province in northern Algeria.
