= Menaceur =

- Town
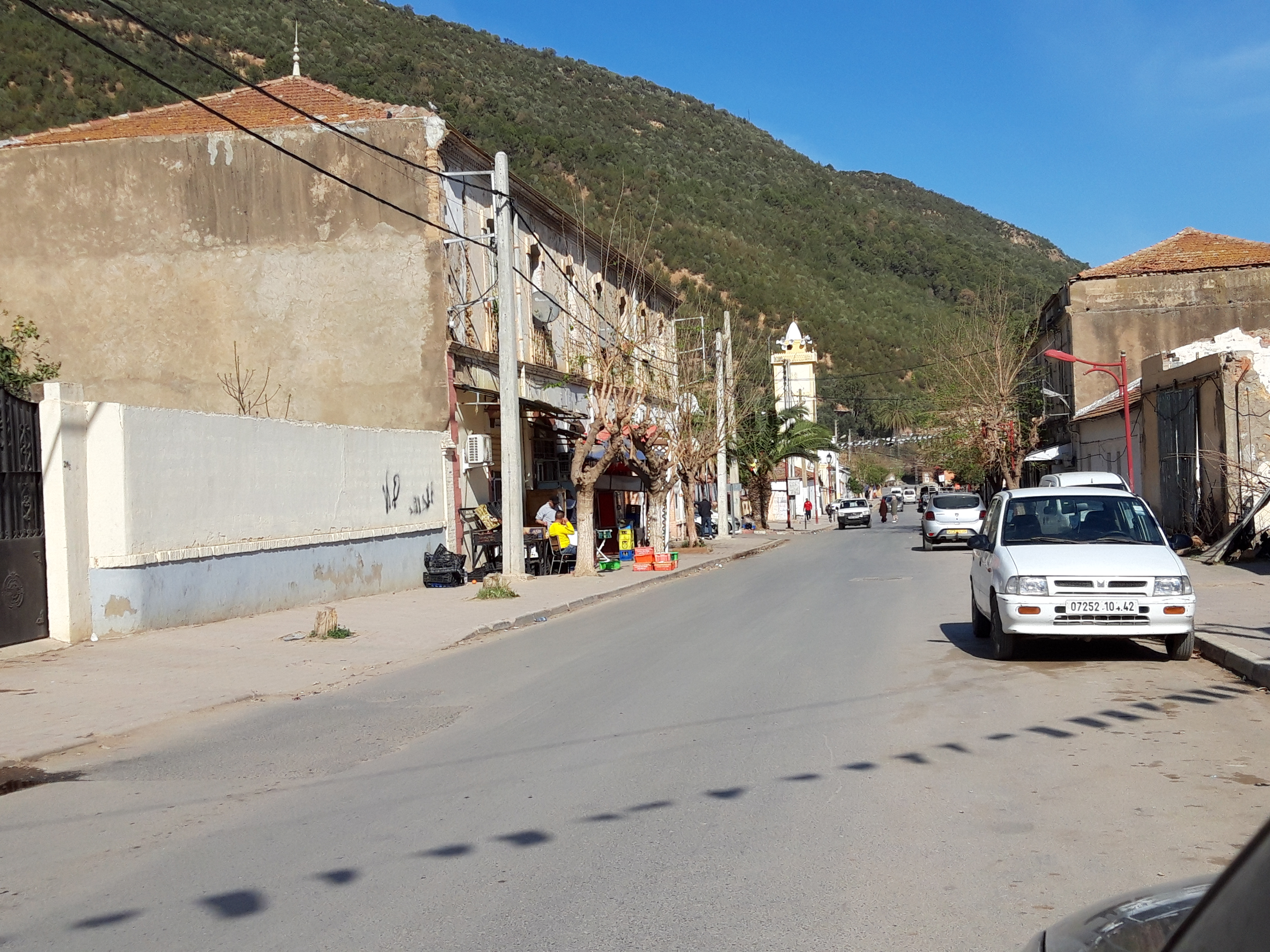

- Location of Menaceur within Tipaza Province

- Menaceur within Algeria
- Coordinates: 36.492000°N 2.220774°E
- Country: Algeria
- Province: Tipaza
- Commune: Menaceur

Population (2008)
  - Total: 25,480

Menaceur is a small town and commune in Algeria, situated about 100 km west of Algiers. Menaceur has a population of 40,000. The Bouchanoun River passes through Menaceur. Nearby mountains include Zabrir, el Pic, Boumaad, and Tizi Franco.

== History ==
Menaceur is known for its fight against French colonization. Tizi Franco, where French troops were ambushed in 1957, deeply influenced French army tactics in the region.
