= Gouraya =

Coordinates: 36°34′N 1°54′E

Gouraya قوراية
- Commune and town
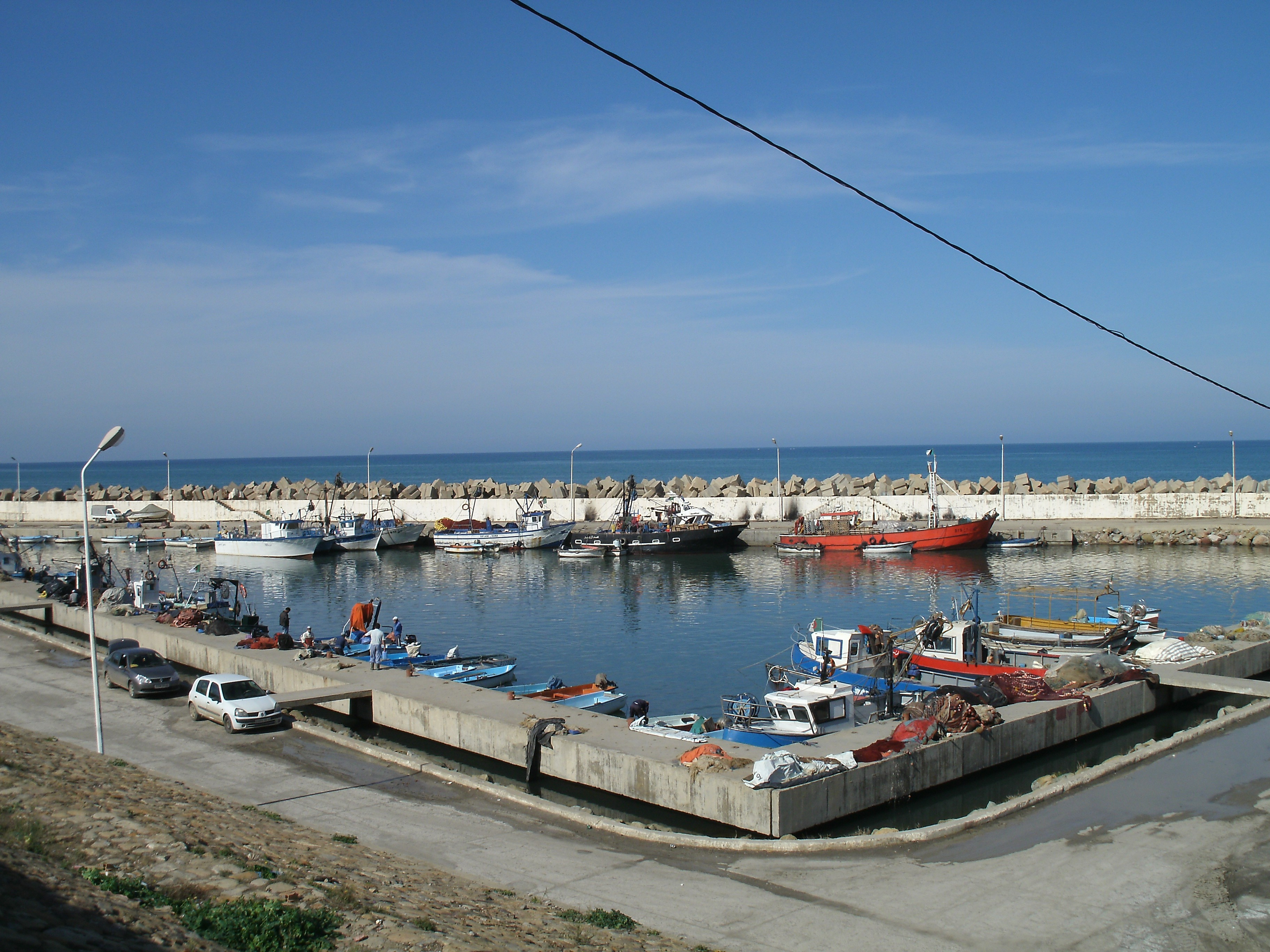

- Location of Gouraya within Tipaza Province
- Country: Algeria
- Province: Tipaza Province
- Time zone: UTC+1 (CET)

Gouraya is a town and commune in Tipaza Province in northern Algeria. The majority of its inhabitants speak Tamazight language.
