= Chenoua people =

Chenouis
Icenwiyen / ⵉⵛⵏⵡⵉⵢⵏ
- Proposed Chenoua flag

- Zoulikha Oudai, an Algerian Chenoua woman

Total population
- 108,000-750,000

Regions with significant populations
- Mount Chenoua, Tipaza Province, Chlef Province, Ain Defla Province, Algiers

Languages
- Chenoua, Algerian Arabic, French

Religion
- Sunni islam

Related ethnic groups
- Riffians, Kayble people, Mozabite people, Chaoui people and other Berbers

The Chenoua people (Shenwa: Icenwiyen / ⵉⵛⵏⵡⵉⵢⵏ, Arabic: شنوة) are a Berber ethnic group indigenous to Mount Chenoua and the Dahra Mountain Range in northern Algeria, which spans Tipaza Province, parts of Chlef Province, and the northern areas of Ain Delfa Province. They were a part of the broader Mauri identity in antiquity. They have a population of about 108,000 to 750,000 people, depending on the source. The Chenoua refer to themselves as the Icenwiyen.

The Chenoua traditionally speak the Shenwa language, a Northern Berber language that is closely related to the Shawiya language in the Aurès Mountains and other Zenata Berber varieties. The Shenwa language has about 76,000 speakers. In 1843, the Chenoua tribe Beni Menacer was one of the first Berber tribes to resist French colonization. One of the most prominent Chenoua people was Zoulikha Oudai, dubbed the "mother of martyrs."

== Etymology ==
The English word 'Chenoua' is derived from the Arabic "شنوة" (Shanawa) which then derives from the local Mount Chenoua, the known cultural "anchor" of the Chenoua people, near Tipaza. This term is commonly used in English or French texts.

The Chenoua people call themselves the Icenwiyen (ⵉⵛⵏⵡⵉⵢⵏ) and call their language Haqbaylit or Haqbayləkt. The term comes from the Ottomans, who broadly applied the label to mountain-dwelling peoples. Today, this has confused linguists as they use the term to refer to the Kabyle further west. Nonetheless, the Chenoua have continued to use the Haqbaylit or Haqbayləkt term for their language.

== History ==
=== Antiquity ===
The region where the Chenoua people live today has been inhabited for over 10,000 years. Across Antiquity, the Middle Ages, and the early modern period, the Chenoua people were not distinct from the loosely connected Berber tribes of the wider Maghreb.

In the 8th century BC, the Phoenicians established colonies along the southern Mediterranean to the Strait of Gibraltar. Tipaza, thought to be a cultural city of the Chenoua people, was one of the cities founded by the Punics as a trade post around the 6th century BC. The city became a major maritime post as the Punics heavily engaged and mixed with the local Berber population, whom they called the Libyans.

Roman ruins of Tipaza, Algeria.

In the 3rd century BC, the area was under the control of the Masaesyli. King Syphax of the Masaesyli famously allied with Carthage in the Second Punic War, which led to his defeat. After the fall of Carthage, the region fully came under Numidian rule. The reign of Mauretanian King Juba II flourished and rebuilt coastal cities, including Tipaza and Caesarea, the new capital.The region surrounding Mount Chenoua was later annexed by the Romans, who called the Berbers the Mauri.

Those living in Roman colonies were given Roman citizenship as the cities continued to prosper. In contrast, while the coastal cities were becoming heavily Romanized and Christianized, rural Mauri populations in the mountains retained their language and culture without much assimilation. This trend would continue throughout history. Others became part of the Roman military, mainly as cavalrymen. In 372, Firmus led a rebellion against several coastal cities, sacking them. Berber populations retained their rural communities and cultures while the Vandals controlled the region.

=== Middle Ages ===
After the collapse of Roman North Africa, the Mauro-Roman Kingdom controlled the modern Chenoua heartland. By 533, Byzantine forces had conquered the Vandal Kingdom and various different Berber kingdoms had been scattered across the Maghreb. While the same ancient cities of Caesarea and Tipaza were under Byzantine control, the Berber kingdoms kept sovereignty over inland and mountainous terrain. Various conflicts would break out between the Berbers and the Byzantines. The coastal cities would remain under Byzantine control up until the Arab invasions.

Peak territories of the Umayyad Caliphate.

In the 8th century, following the Arab conquest of Egypt, the Umayyad Caliphate began their invasion of the Maghreb. By 711, they had conquered its entirety. Under Arab rule, the Berbers rapidly converted to Islam. Since the Umayyads were focused on the flatlands, mountainous and rural Berber communities were able to keep their culture, language, and clans. Some Berbers stayed Christians. Yet, due to heavy taxations and discriminatory behavior from the Arabs, the Berbers heavily opposed the Umayyads. This led to the Great Berber Revolt, in which the ancestors of the Chenoua took part of, which ended Umayyad rule in the region.

In the 11th century, following the Zirid Dynasty's proclamation of splitting from the Fatimid Caliphate, the Fatimids retaliated by encouraging Bedouin Arab tribes, such as the Banu Hilal and Banu Sulaym, to migrate into the Zirid and defeat them. Unlike previous Arab migrations, which somewhat allowed the Berber identity to thrive in rural areas, the migrations of the Bedouin Arabs largely arabized the Berber populations, including the modern Chenoua. The Zirid Dynasty was destroyed and the nearby Hammadid Dynasty and Zenata Berbers were weakened. This is a major factor of the modern Arabization of the Chenoua people.

The Zenata Berbers, the ancestors of the Chenoua, were able to govern themselves with tribal councils in the mountains.

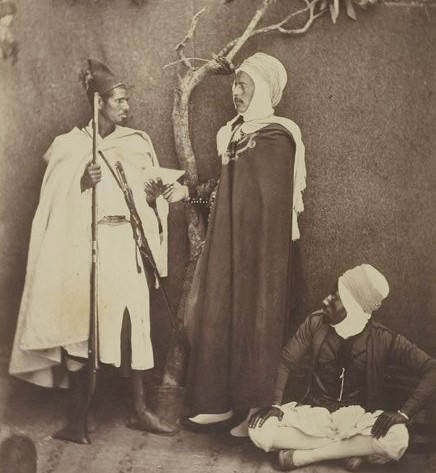
The Makhzen.

=== Ottoman Empire ===
In 1516, the Barbarossa brothers captured Algiers from the Spanish and proclaimed themselves as the sultans of Algeria. After Aruj's death, his brother Hayreddin brought the territory to the Ottoman Empire in 1520, who founded the city as the Regency of Algiers. Unlike other urbanized centers or agricultural plains directly controlled by the Ottomans, rural Berber communities continued to have a sort of preserved culture, even with arabization. This successfully preserved the Shenwa language spoken by Chenoua people and their Sunni Muslim beliefs today. Meanwhile, Turkish soldiers settled the coastal cities of the region's lowlands, mixing with the Berber population and producing Kourouglis.

The Regency of Algiers depended on the Makhzen to levy taxes in rural areas. The Chenoua and other Berbers of the mountains resisted these taxes, resulting in several skirmishes. Whenever the Ottoman beys asserted authority, the Chenoua would retreat back to their forts in the mountains. Yet, even with divisions, the Ottomans and Chenoua were unified in their battle against the Europeans. The Chenoua people would loosely ally with the Ottomans whenever the Christians invaded the region's coasts. Some Chenoua, alongside other Berbers, even participated in piracy. In the 1740s, English traveler Thomas Shaw visited the Regency of Algiers, describing Mount Chenoua and the people.

=== French Algeria and Algerian War ===
Following the French invasion of Algiers in 1830, French forces moved westward toward Tipaza, Cherchell, and the rest of the region. The Chenoua population experienced a sharp decline during French occupation, as it is estimated that their population was reduced down to a quarter. The region faced multiple insurrections in the early 1840s, notably with the campaigns of the Hadjout tribes, who reached the east of Algiers in the beginning of 1830.

The Chenoua Beni Menacer tribe, which extended from the east of Mostaganem to the west of Chlef to the south of Miliana, was one of the first Berber tribes to resist French colonization. The tribe had been superior in the mountainous landscape of the region and took advantage of Emir Abdelkader's fall to remain dominant. In response, French Marshal Thomas Robert Bugeaud led a military campaign into the region, and after two months of a siege, finally took control. Local tribes continued to resist, but with much less impact. By 1845, Bugeaud's forces began to use scorched-earth tactics in the Chenoua region.

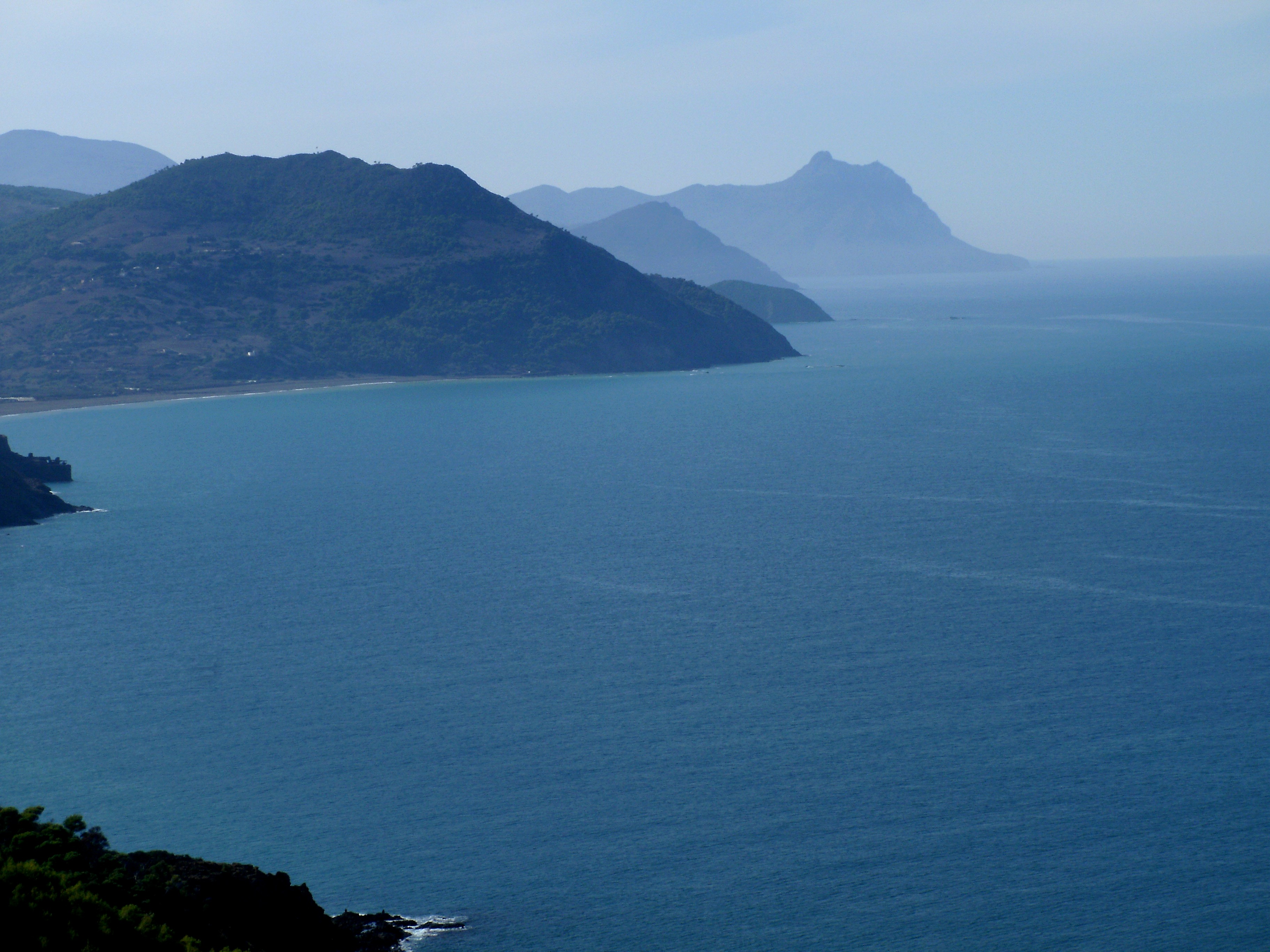
The Dahra Mountain Range from the sea.

Across the Dahra Mountain Range region, French forces conducted the pacification campaigns. From 1841 1842, Bugeaud's scorched-earth tactics triggered to the Sabih fires, which burnt down several forests in the region. Around 1,500 died from these fires. The French army additionally used asphyxiation tactics to end local tribal resistance. Marshal Bugeaud was a primary user of asphyxiation tactics, ordering the mass suffocation of Chenoua in caves with smoke and fire, killing around 1,500 people. Chenoua revolutionary Malek El Berkani worked with the Kabyle to lead the 1870s Mokrani Revolt. European settlers seized land in the region's fertile valleys, which relocated many of the Chenoua to more urban areas.

During the Algerian War, the region of the Chenoua became an important stronghold for the National Liberation Army (FLN). The region's caves, ravines, and rough territory provided cover for the frequent ambushes against French forces. In response, the French fortified foothills and deployed blockades along coastal roads. named the "mother of martyrs," Zoulikha Oudai became the head of the FLN in the Cherchell sector. After being executed by French forces by being thrown from a helicopter, her legacy led to the author Assia Djebar composing the film The Nouba of the Women of Mount Chenoua.

=== Modern Algeria ===
After immense arabization by the FLN, the Shenwa language was heavily marginalized and became limited to the elderly. Younger generations began to use Algerian Arabic in everyday conversation, marginalizing the language further. The 1980 Berber Spring protests, though not centered on the Chenoua, inspired the region's population. People began to document the language and its dialects, Tamazight was recognized as a national language, and Chenoua inclusion became possible after having gained official status in 2016.

== Geography ==
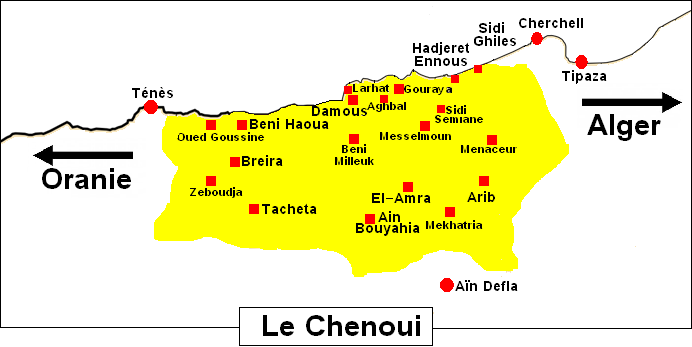
Map of Chenoui areas.

The traditional territory of the Chenoua include Tipaza Province, parts of the Chlef Province and the north of Ain Defla Province. These three provinces are called in reference to the Mount Chenoua which dominates the city of Tipaza, 70 kilometres west of Algiers. Due to the area's mountainous and hilly terrain, the Chenoua have been able to widely preserve their culture and parts of their language, even with widespread arabization. Although they are mutually unintelligible, they closely neighbor the Kabyle to their east. Some call the Chenoua the "Chelhas of the Tell" or the "Kabyles of the West."

The region is part of the greater Dahra Region, a long mountainous region along the Mediterranean coast, separated from the Ouarsenis mountain range by the Chelif River. It extends from 8 kilometres north of Mostaganem to the Algiers Sahel, with its highest point being Mount Zaccar in Miliana. Mount Chenoua, which is 42 kilometres west of Algiers, marks the easternmost point of the Chenoua speaking region, while Ténès, 200 kilometres west of Algiers, marks the westernmost point, or even Ouled Boughalem depending on the source. The southern portions of the region are dominated by a vast depression full of farms, pine forests, and scrublands.

The people of the region have lived through several historic kingdoms and empires, including Masaesyli, Numidia, the Roman Empire, the Byzantine Empire, the Umayyad Caliphate, Almohad Empire, the Zayyanid Kingdom, the Regency of Algiers, the French, and several other, smaller Berber kingdoms throughout history. During the spread of Islam, the mountains and rural landscape of the region provided cultural preservation for hundreds of years.

Algerian cities with a significant Chenoua population are Tipaza, Cherchell, Fouka, Tenes, Nador, Hadjout, and Miliana, where they make up the majority of the population. Tipaza is thought to be the core cultural city of the Chenoua, neighboring Mount Chenoua. Nador is located in a fertile valley. Hadjout is home to the largest Chenoua market, named "souk rushes" in Berber. Large numbers of people visit as merchants. Two major wadis are located in the region: one in the spring and the other in the autumn.

== Culture ==
Image of one of many mosques in Cherchell.

=== Language ===
The Chenoua traditionally speak the Shenwa language (Berber: Haqbaylit or Haqbayləkt), a Northern Berber language. It is a part of the wider Afro-Asiatic language family and is a variation of Zenati Berber. The Shenwa language is concentrated along the Dahra Mountain Range, across Tipaza Province, parts of Chlef Province, and Ain Delfa Province. The Chenoua population largely speaks Arabic, although there are still speakers of the Shenwa language. There have been various movements to further revive the language and culture.

The Shenwa language has about 76,000 speakers, around 70.37% of 108,000, the least amount of the estimated Chenoua population.

=== Religion ===
The Chenoua people are dominantly Sunni Muslim of the Maliki school, mixing with Algeria's 99% Muslim population. Cities such as Tipaza and Cherchell serve as hubs for Muslim worship for rural Chenoua populations. During the holy month of Ramadan, they are not allowed to eat during the day. The Mufti, usually men, are interpreters of the Quran. Holy men, called Muezzins, are thought to be endowed by God with special abilities.

The day of Ashura is a day to commemorate the dead. During Eid al-Fitr, there is usually a large feast.

=== Folklore ===
View of Mount Chenoua at sunset.

Mount Chenoua is the cultural "anchor" of the Chenoua people. Along the coast, "When Chenoua puts on its hat, it will soon rain on Cherchell" was a common saying whenever the mountain was covered in clouds. Many locals report that the mountain resembles the silhouette of a sleeping woman.

According to a legend which dates back to antiquity, a beautiful Berber princess of the Beni Menacer tribe was set to be engaged to a Kabyle prince; however, she had really loved a fisherman from the coast. So, on the day of her marriage, she ran to the mountains with her lover. The enraged king yelled a curse out: "May the earth swallow you whole and may you remain there for eternity!" Soon after, an earthquake turned the princess into a reclining mountain with her face facing the sky. Her true lover became a stone statue of a lion with the purpose of protecting her. Whenever the princess cried from the memories of her love, the tears became the rain that fell onto the region.

The Evil Eye is also a prominent part of Chanoua culture. Pottery, weaving blankets, rainfall, and prepared soil are thought to be protective wards.

=== Nomad architecture and agriculture ===
Close example of a traditional home.

The Chenoua are historically mountain-dwelling people. Many of them were nomadic and didn't lay claim to plots of land, although they marked tribal borders. They often slept on makeshift beds while more stationary Chenoua slept in bigger homes or huts. A stationary settlement would include one or multiple huts alongside extra buildings supporting livestock. Thorny shrubs, pine trees, or zebboudj would shelter the area. Nearly every settlement would either neighbor a spring or include a water well. A hazekka is a small home made with stone entirely held together with earth mortar or clay. The house only has a door, a small window, and a makeshift bed called an afithal. In front of every home would be a koucht (an oven) and a deep hole to gather rain water. A small bag of dirt taken from a marabout's grave would hang above the entrance for good luck.

=== Agriculture ===
In tradition, the Chenoua are forbidden to interact with a hen's eggs without the presence of foreigners or their families. Men are unable to sell chickens at any market; only women and children are allowed to. The men are allowed to eat the eggs, but only with their family. Figs, pomegranates, carobs, nuts, and acorns can be planted in the first furrow. They are also seen as symbols of fertility and good harvest. Substances like salt, henna, rain, and eggs are seen as vessels of bakara with protective traits against harmful spirits.

A fig tree.

Abderrahman ben Chama is seen as one of the most respected saints to the Chenoua. Originating from Meknes, he arrived in the region around the year 800 and had great influence. Once Chama died, violent conflicts broke out between the different tribes. Once they settled down, two koubbas were constructed: one in the countryside and one in Cherchell. Whenever a local wadi fills with water, it marks the beginning of the fig harvest season. Overnight, farmers place figs at each of Chama's koubbas. On the first day following the beginning of the fig season, a khammes (sharecropper) plows the field. Before doing so, the khammes and his landowner eat a loaf of bread with honey and butter together. That following evening, a large feast is held between the settlers. Roasted chicken and couscous are usually the main dishes. On the way back to their hazekka, they would rub the horns of an ox with oil.

=== Social organization ===
The Chenoua moved around mainly to acquire food and resources for themselves or their groups. The women of a settlement would build containers covered with linen, called ikhoubal, that would contain wheat, barley, fig, chickpea, and other crops. A 10-centimetre opening is located on the top of an ikhoubal to pour the insides. Chenoua elect their own tribal leaders, although they live in a multiparty republic. Chenoua traditions and tribes are largely based on loyalty. Certain groups, called Sofs, are political parties that govern the tribe and villages inside of that tribe. The leaders of Sofs are based on wealth and social status. Within tribes, trade consists of crops and ceramics. More urban areas export oil and gas.

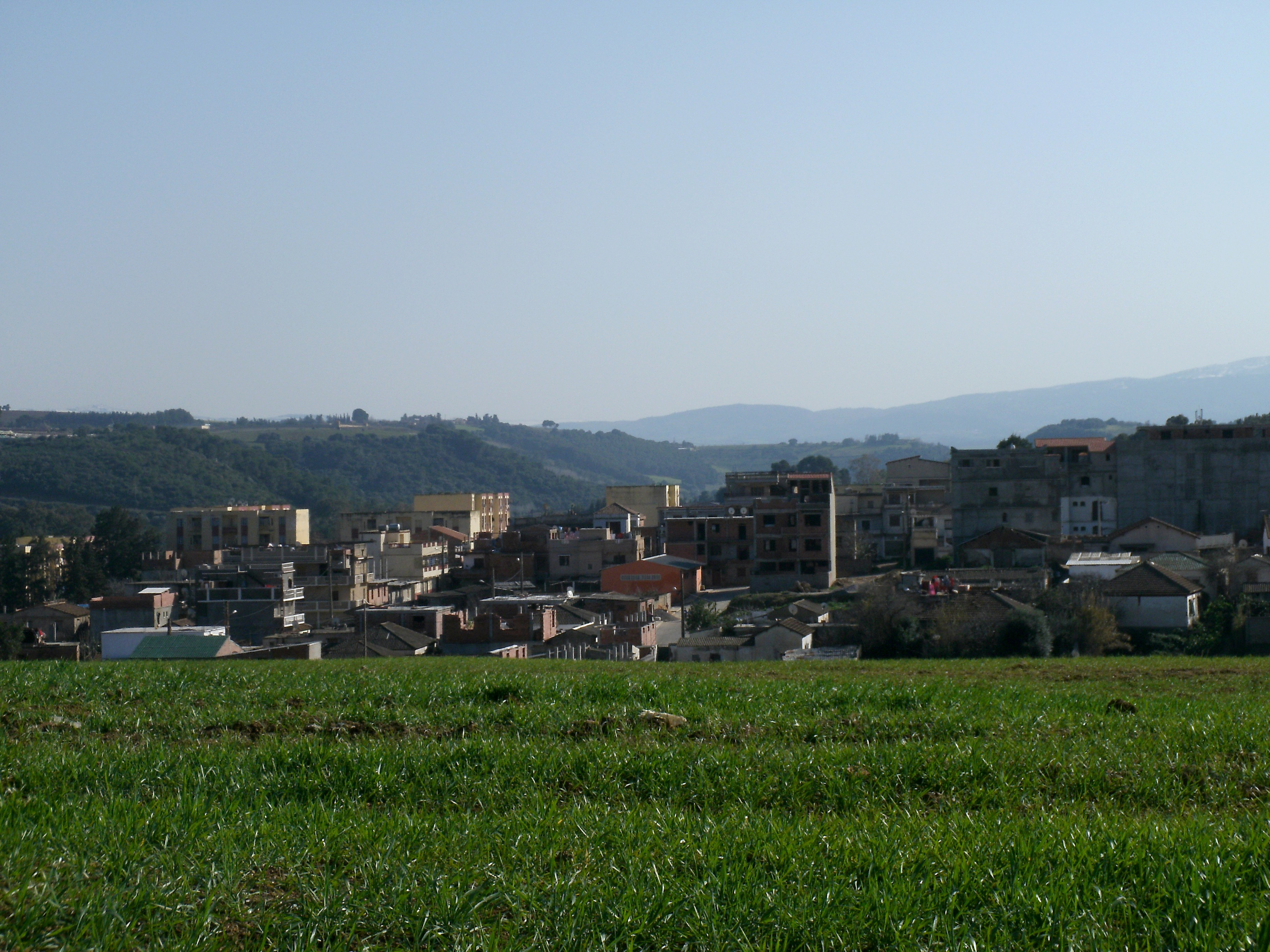
A view of the town of Nador in Tipaza Province.

Traditionally, the husband, his wife, and their children would continue to live with the husband's parents and grandparents. Divorced or widowed children would live in the household, too. Divorce is widely uncommon, with only 4% of families being divorced according to reports. Most families have an average family size of eight people, and Chenoua women are believed to have magical powers. For most of their younger lives, women are considered minors by their parents. The mean height for men is 5'8, while for women it's 5'4. Men and women are only allowed to marry outside of the family. They cannot marry anybody related to them, either by prior marriage, blood, or acquisition. If a mother were to die, her children would go to the mother's parents. Men and women are not usually seen speaking with one another in public unless they are related by blood or marriage. Homosexuality is widely seen as illegal and taboo by older generations. Gay marriage has historically been unthinkable.

Clothing, jewelry, and veils are usually constructed by women. The Chenoua traditionally wear turbans, tunics, and veils all made of wool. They are all normally colored indigo and black. Jewelry is made of leather, metal, and several kinds of gems. Horse saddles are decorated with trik. Normally, the Chenoua wear veils and scarfs while outside.

Every Chenoua tribe had their own unique identity. Most conflicts within the region were between different Chenoua tribes. Around 4.7% of Chenoua males die due to warfare, many of them above the age of 17. Historically, tensions and conflicts with Al-Qaeda have driven the Chenoua out of their native lands. The Chenoua have close relations and ties with the neighboring Kabyle, Mozabites, Chaoui, and Tuareg Berbers.

=== Tools and weapons ===
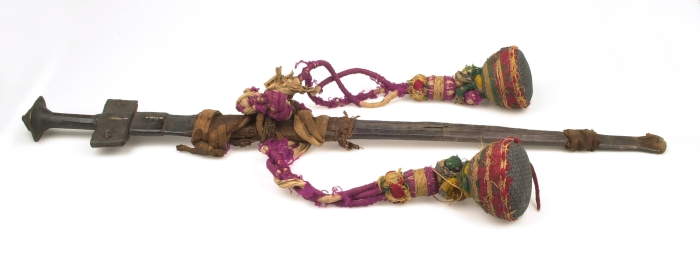
A takoba.

The Chenoua people have created several kinds of tools and weapons:

- The takoba, a one-meter long sword;
- The allagh, a two-meter long lance;
- A tagheda, a small and shart assegai;
- The taganze, a leather-covered wooden bow;
- An amur, a wooden arrow that goes with the taganze;
- A sheru, a long sharp dagger;
- A tellak, a short dagger kept in a sheath attached to a forearm;
- A taburek; a wooden spear

=== Literature ===
One of the most prominent examples of Chenoua literature comes from the movie The Nouba of the Women of Mount Chenoua, directed by Assia Djebar. The movie features Lila, a Chenoua who returns to her native region. The film shows the inhabitants of Chenoua Mountain, their culture, and the role of Chenoua women in society. The Chenoua people have a large variety of traditional dances and music:

- Tisiway is traditional Chenoua poetry passed down by generation to generation;
- Tasikisikit is a genre of songs preformed by Chenoua women during ceremonies;
- The men sing tahengemmit, a slower and calmer variation of tasikisikit;
- Children sing bellulla while playing the fandangama, a small monochord instrument;
- The tagest is a common dance that is preformed while sitting;
- Ewegh is a dance done by couples during ceremonies.

=== Gastronomy ===
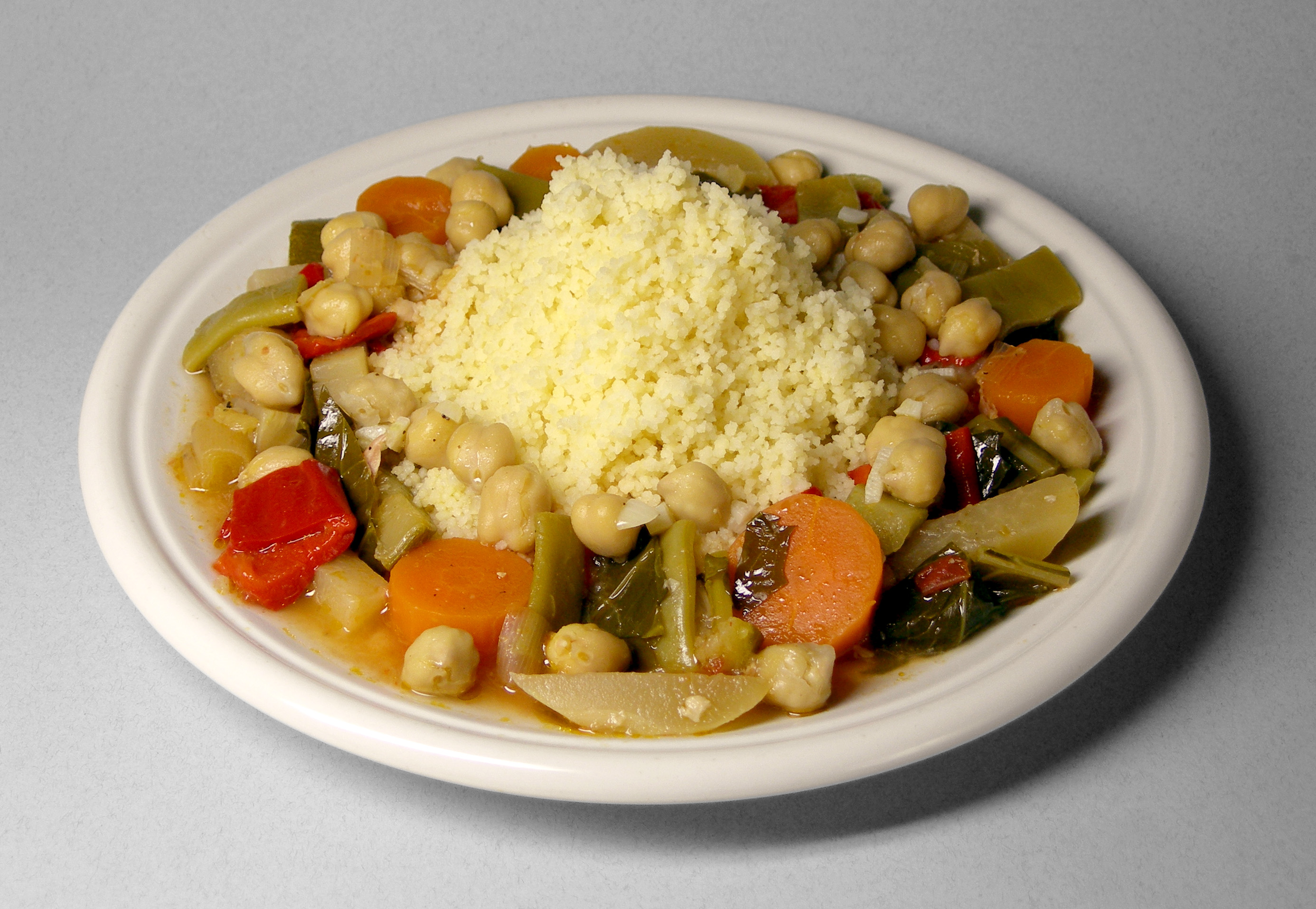
Couscous with chickpeas and vegetables.

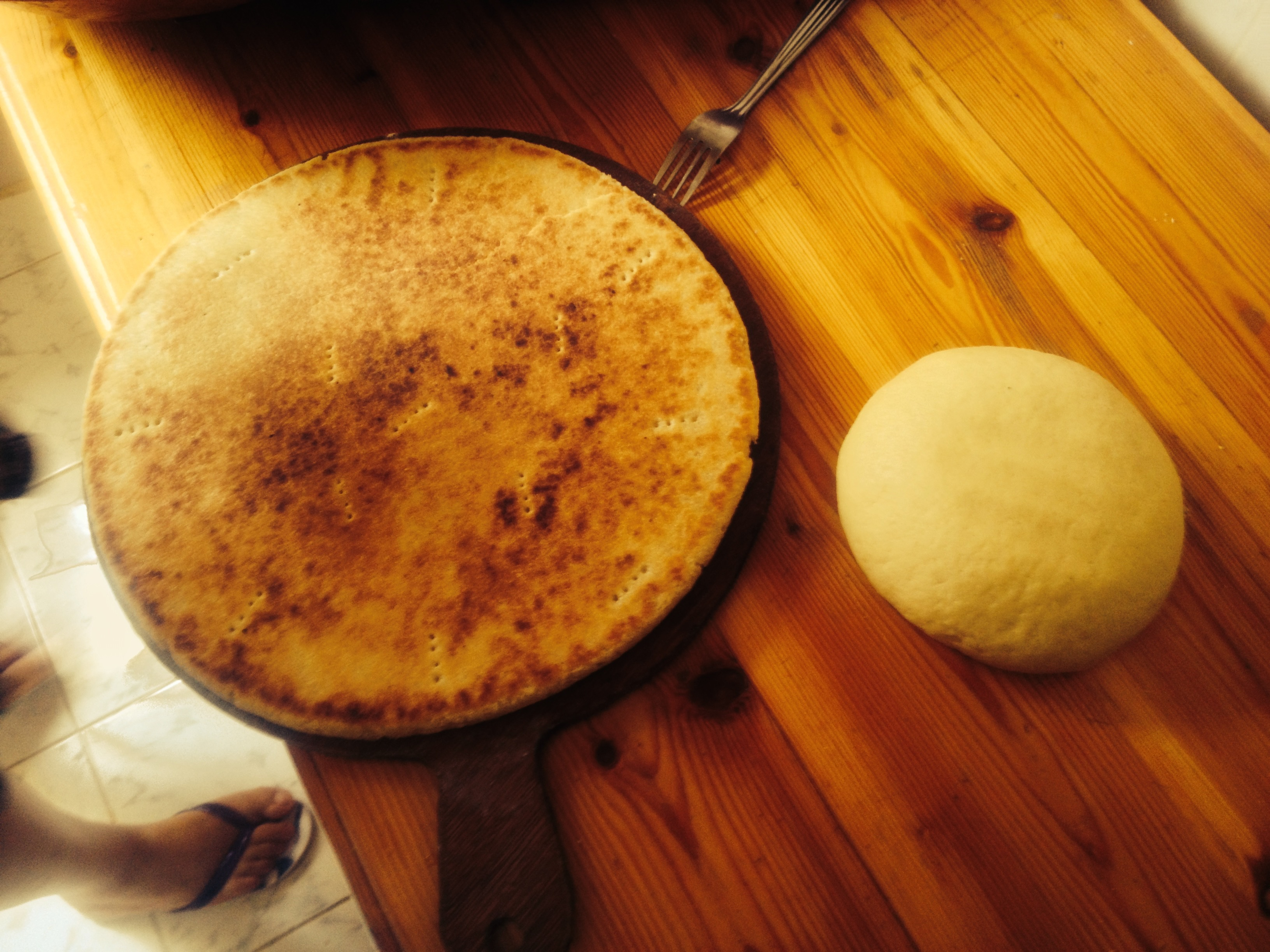
Chenoua Kesra in a pan.

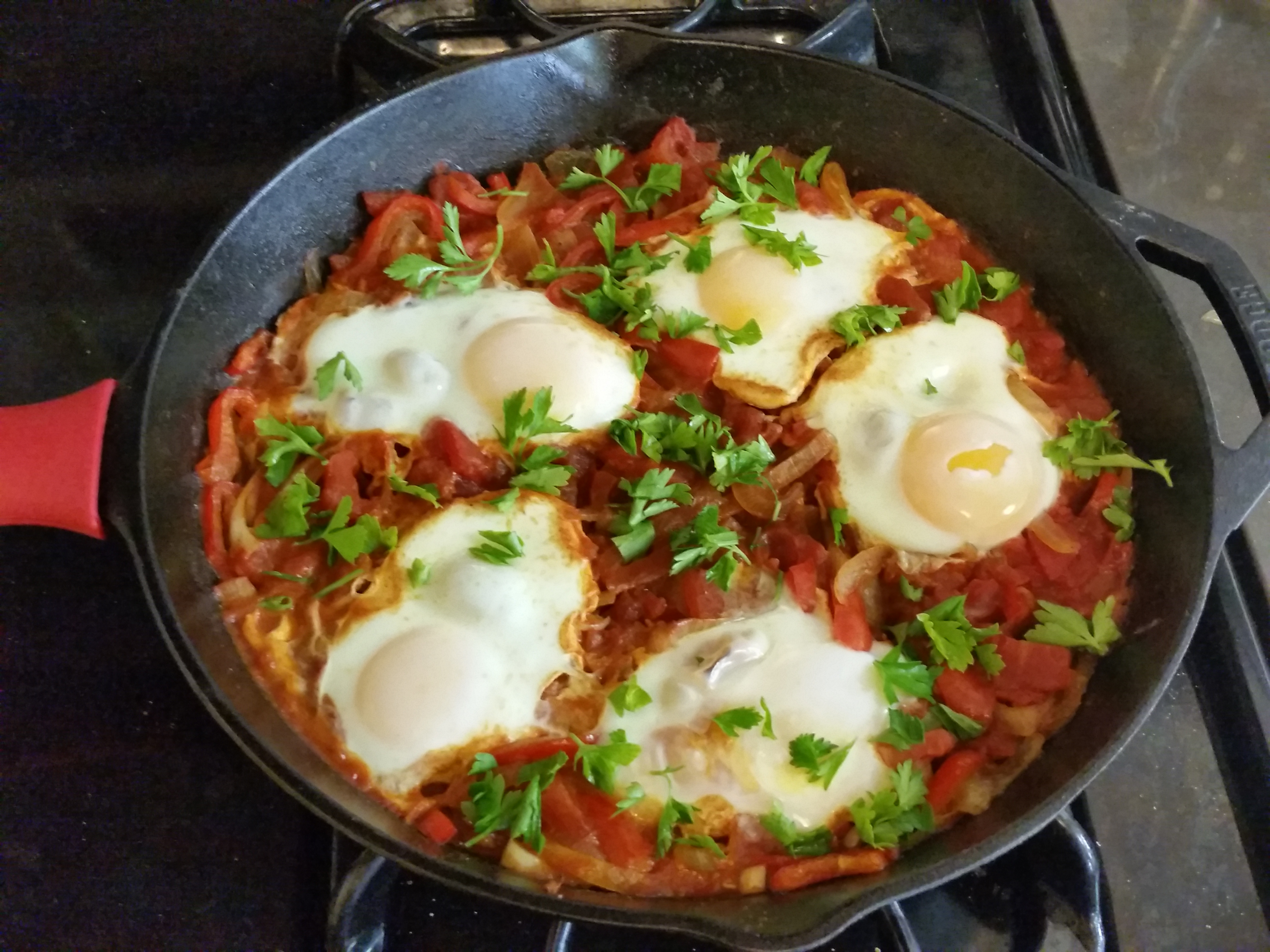
Shakshuka.

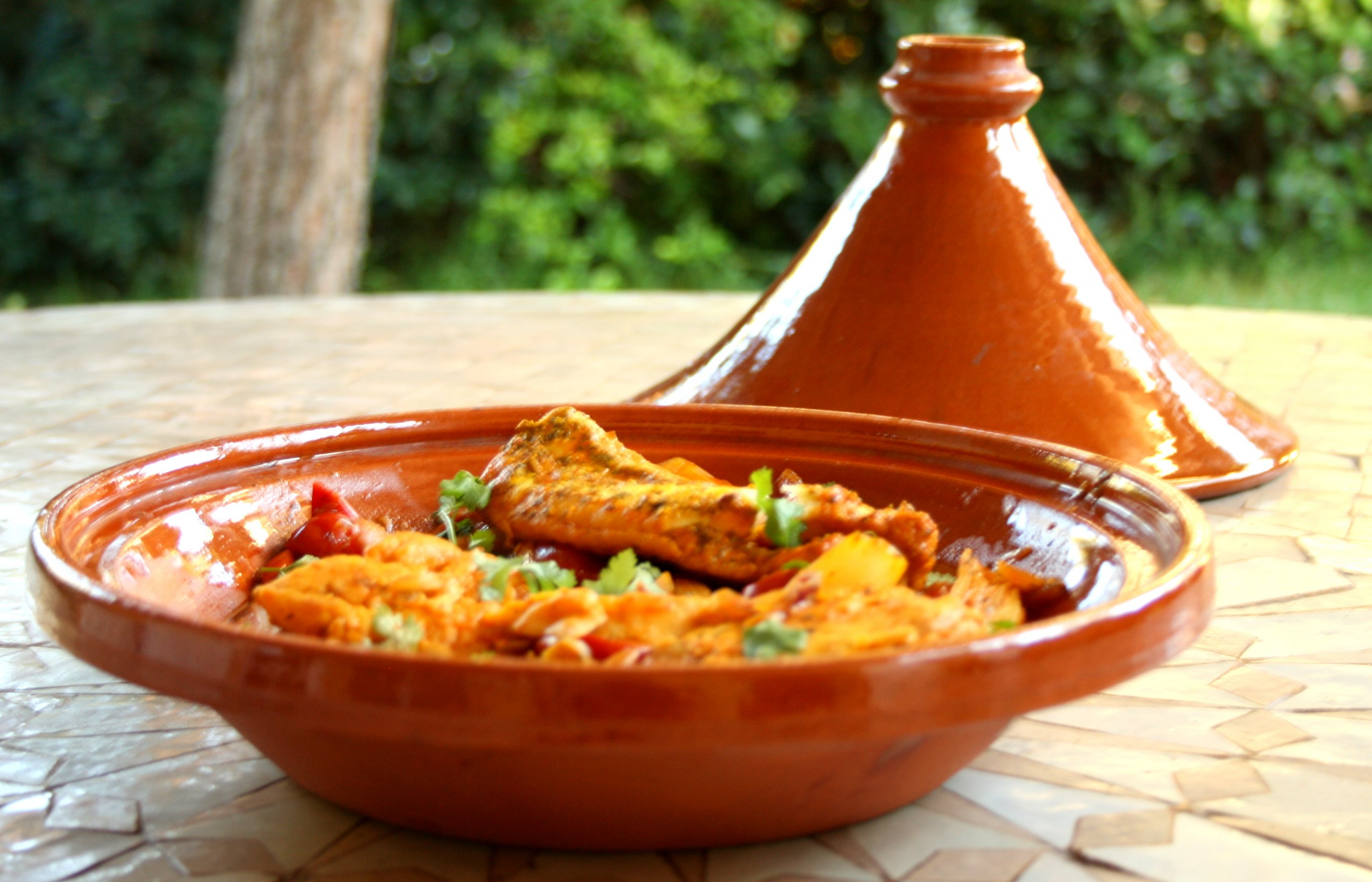
A pot of tajine.

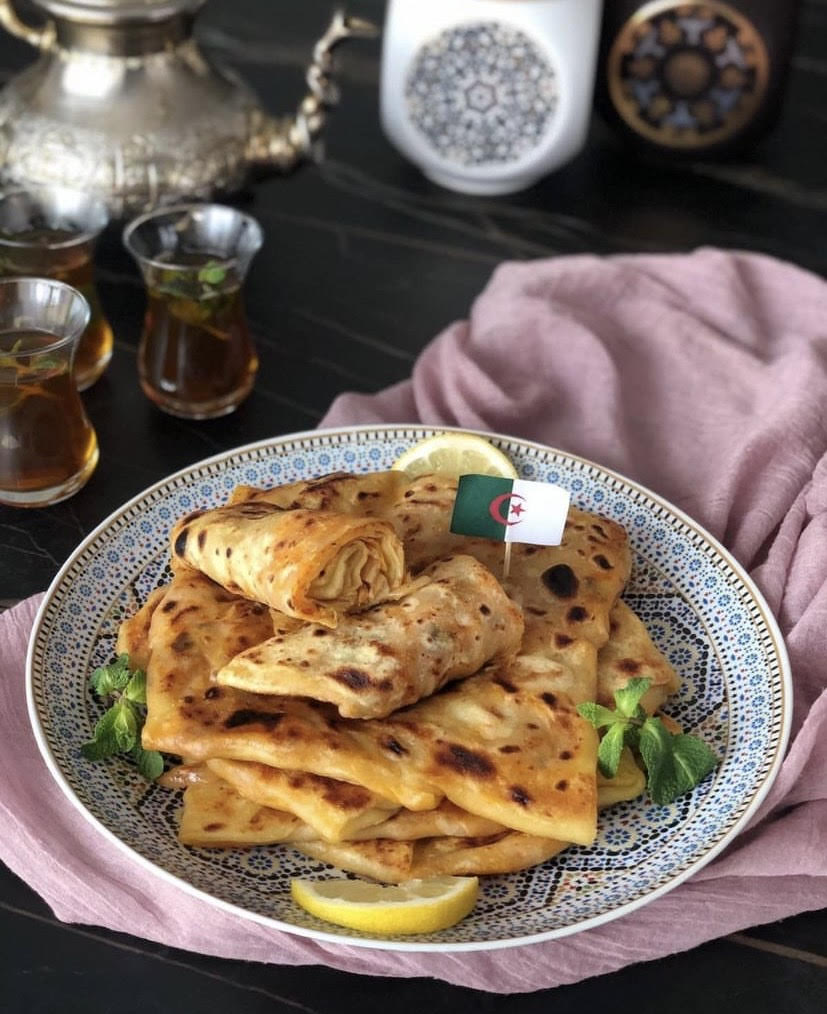
Plate of mahdjouba.

As many Chenoua women work from home, they usually are the ones preparing meals during ceremonies. Chenoua cuisine varies throughout the region, however a common main dish throughout the region is semolina wheat steamed and served with proteins and vegetables. Dishes made along the coast are usually centered around seafood, while highlander dishes include more meats and protein. Traditional meats are lamb and chicken served with gravy. Bourek, mincemeat, fried onions, and eggs are also popular items to be served. While it is mainly consumed within the Chaoui Berber population in eastern Algeria, chakhchoukha is also a main dish in Chenoua culture. Typical Chenoua dishes include:

Typical Chenoua dishes
Dish	Ingredients	Commonly found
Couscous	Steam-crushed durum semolina wheat	Common throughout North Africa
Bourek	Made of thin pastry sheets with potato, onion, and cumin filling	Common throughout North Africa
Chakhchoukha	Cooked semolina dough with tomato sauce and flatbread	Common throughout Algeria
Shakshouka	Dish of poached eggs with tomato sauce, olive oil, peppers, onions, and garlic	Common Chenoua dish
Rechta	Pasta cut into strips with chicken, chickpeas, and turnips with black pepper	Common Chenoua dish
Berkoukes	Couscous cooked in broth with vegetables and spices	Eaten during the winter season
Sardines el-Dersa	Sardines stuffed in dersa (garlic paste)	Found along the coast
Chtitha Batata	Potato stew cooked in dersa	Found along the coast
Tajine Zitoun	Chicken with green olive stew;	Common Chenoua dish
Loubia b'dersa	White bean stew with tender navy or butter beans simmered in dersa;	Common Chenoua dish
Chorba Bil Hout	Fish combined with shrimp or mussels with tomato paste;	Found along the coast
Chorba frik	Lamb simmered with coriander, mint, and frik (wheat)	Eaten during the winter season
Varatities of flatbread	Khobz el-dâr (leavened), Kesra (cooked and broken by hand), Harcha (cooked on hot pan), Mahdjouba (stuffed and folded), Msemen (square shaped and multi layered)	Common Chenoua dish
Tajine	Lamb, beef, chicken, fish stew contained in a conical lid	Common Chenoua dish
Mechoui	Sheep or lamb splits slow-roasted a barbecue	Eaten during Eid-al-Adha
Mint tea	Tea made with peppermint;	Found along the coast
Makroud el Louse	Almond cookies with lemon zest and orange blossom water, soaked in syrup and coated in powdered sugar;	Found along the coast
Rfiss Chlefi	Non-baked dates and semolina wheat	Common Chenoua dish
Hmiss	Roasted vegetable salad with grilled peppers, tomatoes, and garlic seasoned with olive oil and salt	Common Chenoua dish

== Economy ==
Due to the region's dry climate and limited fertile land, the Chenoua people are largely adapted into dispersed settlement patterns. The region is traditionally based on arboriculture, harvesting fruit trees, orchards, and gardens. Fishery is a common practice along the coast. Forests provide the people fuel and wood for construction as they also use the resources for exporting and trade. Managing water resources was important to sustain these practices during periods of drought. Livestock farming is also an important part of the local economy, as well as food industries and rugmaking.

== Politics ==
Their main advocacy groups are the Chenoua Homeland Association, the Chenoui Khaloui Kima Medari, the Ichenwiyen, and the Tipaza Shenwa. The region mainly supports the Berber Socialism and Revolution Party and the Socialist Forces Front.
