= Chenoua =

Chenoua, alternate spelling Shenwa, may refer to:

- Mount Chenoua, a mountain range in Algeria.
- The Chenouas, a Berber population inhabiting Algeria.
- The Shenwa language.
