= Battle of Sidi Semiane =

Battle during the Algerian War

- Part of Algerian War
Date	20 May 1957
Location	Sidi Semiane, French Algeria
Result	FLN victory

Belligerents
France	(Algeria) FLN

Strength
Algerian claims: 850 soldiers	Algerian claims: 35 militants

Casualties and losses
Algerian claims: 150 killed, 200 wounded	Algerian claims: 2 killed

The Battle of Sidi Semiane was a four-hour combat during the Algerian War of Independence which took place on 20 May 1957 in the Dahra mountains in Wilaya IV.

The French army launched an attack on the mujahideen of the Algerian National Liberation Front in response to the Algerian victory in the battle of Sidi Mohand Aklouche on 26 April 1957. The battle lasted more than four hours. Algerian sources say that French commander Gaudion and his battalion suffered a heavy defeat which cost him more than 150 dead and more than 200 wounded, while the Algerians lost two men, Si Slimane and Si Mahfoud.
