= Demographics of Algeria =

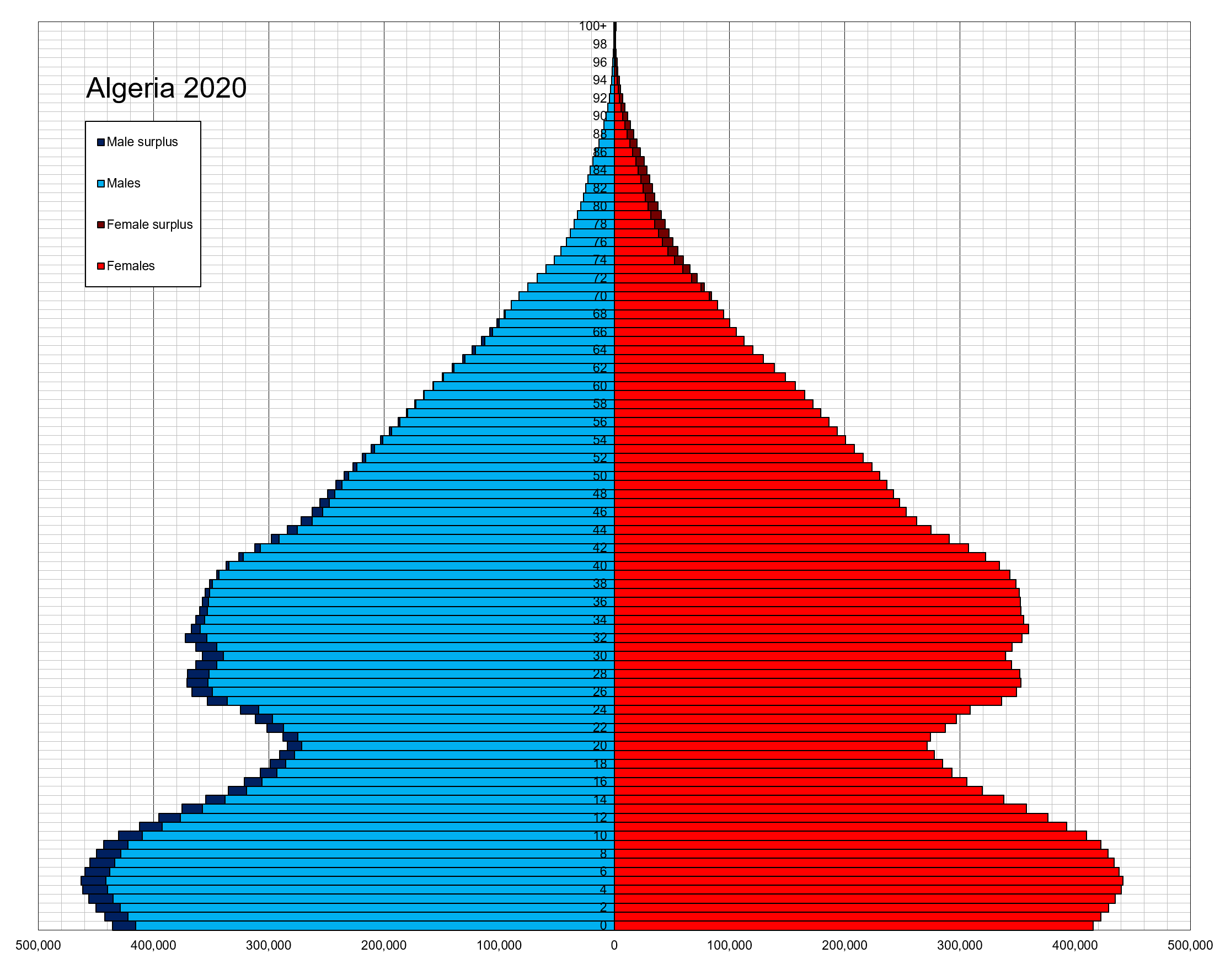
- Population pyramid of Algeria in 2020
- Population: 48,106,226 (2026 est.)
- Growth rate: 1.52% (2023)
- Birth rate: 19.32 births/1,000 population (2023)
- Death rate: 2.15 deaths/1,000 population (2023)
- Life expectancy: 79.6 years (2023)
  - male: 78.2 years (2023)
  - female: 81 years (2023)
- Fertility rate: 2.37 children born/woman (2025 est.)
- Infant mortality: 19.9 deaths/1,000 live births (2023)
- Net migration rate: -0.82 migrant(s)/1,000
- Immigrant share: 0.6% (2024)

Sex ratio
- Total: 1.03 male(s)/female (2022 est.)
- At birth: 1.05 male(s)/female

Nationality
- Nationality: Algerian
- Major ethnic: Arabs (73.6%)
- Minor ethnic: Berbers (26.2%); Arabized Berbers (3.0%); Other Berbers (23.2%); Others (0.2%)

Language
- Official: Arabic, Amazigh
- Spoken: Arabic, Amazigh

Demographic features of the population of Algeria include population density, ethnicity, education level, health of the populace, economic status, religious affiliations and other aspects. All figures are from National Office of Statistics Algeria and the United Nations Demographic Yearbooks, unless otherwise indicated.

Ninety-one percent of the Algerian population lives along the Mediterranean coast on 12% of the country's total land mass. 75% of the population is urban, and urbanization continues, despite government efforts to discourage migration to the cities.

97% of the population follows Sunni Islam; the few non-Sunni Muslims are mainly Ibadis from the Mozabite valley at 1.3% (see Islam in Algeria).

Christianity in Algeria constitutes about 1% of the total population. While significantly greater during the French colonial years, a mostly foreign Roman Catholic community still exists, as do some Protestants. The Jewish community of Algeria, which once constituted 2% of the total population, has substantially decreased due to emigration, mostly to France and Israel.

Algeria's educational system has grown rapidly since 1962. In 2022, there were almost 11 million pupils and 2 million students. Education is free and compulsory to age 16. Modest numbers of Algerian students study abroad, primarily in France and French-speaking Canada. In 2000, the government launched a major review of the country's educational system.

== Population size and structure ==
Historical population
Year	Pop.	±% p.a.
1000	2,000,000	—
1500	1,500,000	−0.06%
1901	4,739,300	+0.29%
1906	5,231,700	+2.00%
1911	5,563,800	+1.24%
1921	5,804,200	+0.42%
1926	6,066,400	+0.89%
1931	6,553,500	+1.56%
1936	7,234,700	+2.00%
1948	8,681,800	+1.53%
2010	35,600,000	+2.30%
2011	36,300,000	+1.97%
2012	37,100,000	+2.20%
2013	37,900,000	+2.16%
2017	42,200,000	+2.72%
Source: Our World in Data and Office National des Statistiques (ONS)

=== Age distribution ===
Population by Sex and Age Group (Census 16.IV.2008) (Data refer to population in housing units and collective living quarters only.):

Age group	Male	Female	Total	%
Total	17 232 753	16 847 277	34 080 030	100
0–4	1 750 097	1 654 821	3 404 918	9.99
5–9	1 475 674	1 412 702	2 888 376	8.48
10–14	1 662 262	1 596 511	3 258 773	9.56
15–19	1 847 312	1 787 859	3 635 171	10.67
20–24	1 895 703	1 867 801	3 763 504	11.04
25–29	1 730 411	1 691 966	3 422 377	10.04
30–34	1 379 085	1 361 910	2 740 996	8.04
35–39	1 167 250	1 175 529	2 342 779	6.87
40–44	1 007 683	1 010 644	2 018 327	5.92
45–49	817 005	812 432	1 629 436	4.78
50–54	682 358	664 336	1 346 695	3.95
55–59	547 180	515 398	1 062 578	3.12
60–64	354 694	356 788	711 482	2.09
65-69	314 958	316 345	631 303	1.85
70-74	248 672	256 254	504 926	1.48
75-79	181 478	182 364	363 843	1.07
80-84	93 472	93 657	187 130	0.55
85-89	43 307	46 416	89 722	0.26
90-94	13 575	16 097	29 672	0.09
95-99	4 178	5 851	10 028	0.03
100+	252	398	650	<0.01
Age group	Male	Female	Total	Percent
0–14	4 888 033	4 664 034	9 552 067	28.03
15–64	11 428 682	11 244 661	22 673 343	66.53
65+	899 892	917 382	1 817 274	5.33
unknown	16 146	21 200	37 347	0.11

Population Estimates by Sex and Age Group (1.VII.2017):

Age group	Male	Female	Total	%
Total	21 118 894	20 576 732	41 695 626	100
0-4	2 537 210	2 400 525	4 937 735	11.84
5-9	2 155 222	2 034 306	4 189 528	10.05
10-14	1 672 925	1 583 253	3 256 178	7.81
15-19	1 513 910	1 449 966	2 963 876	7.11
20-24	1 728 672	1 662 960	3 391 633	8.13
25-29	1 887 412	1 837 618	3 725 030	8.93
30-34	1 891 310	1 868 670	3 759 980	9.02
35-39	1 672 000	1 638 996	3 310 996	7.94
40-44	1 322 807	1 314 955	2 637 762	6.33
45-49	1 128 564	1 141 789	2 270 354	5.45
50-54	957 002	964 127	1 921 129	4.61
55-59	764 232	765 395	1 529 628	3.67
60-64	623 980	613 837	1 237 817	2.97
65-69	464 950	452 674	917 624	2.20
70-74	288 205	304 720	592 925	1.42
75-79	237 094	252 360	489 454	1.17
80-84	156 185	171 174	327 360	0.79
85+	117 213	119 406	236 619	0.57
Age group	Male	Female	Total	Percent
0-14	6 365 357	6 018 084	12 383 441	29.70
15-64	13 489 890	13 258 314	26 748 204	64.15
65+	1 263 647	1 300 334	2 563 981	6.15

Population Estimates by Sex and Age Group (Estimates 1.VII.2020) (Data refer to national projections.):

Age group	Male	Female	Total	%
Total	22 407 000	21 819 000	44 226 000	100
0-4	2 593 000	2 454 000	5 047 000	11.41
5-9	2 402 000	2 270 000	4 672 000	10.56
10-14	1 949 000	1 838 000	3 787 000	8.56
15-19	1 557 000	1 480 000	3 037 000	6.87
20-24	1 579 000	1 517 000	3 096 000	7.00
25-29	1 800 000	1 738 000	3 538 000	8.00
30-34	1 908 000	1 875 000	3 783 000	8.55
35-39	1 827 000	1 799 000	3 636 000	8.22
40-44	1 514 000	1 489 000	3 003 000	6.79
45-49	1 227 000	1 232 000	2 459 000	5.56
50-54	1 053 000	1 067 000	2 120 000	4.79
55-59	860 000	869 000	1 729 000	3.91
60-64	687 000	690 000	1 377 000	3.11
65-69	546 000	537 000	1 083 000	2.45
70-74	354 000	362 000	716 000	1.62
75-79	240 000	261 000	501 000	1.13
80-84	170 000	191 000	361 000	0.82
85+	141 000	150 000	291 000	0.66
Age group	Male	Female	Total	Percent
0-14	6 944 000	6 562 000	13 506 000	30.54
15-64	14 012 000	13 756 000	27 768 000	62.79
65+	1 451 000	1 501 000	2 952 000	6.67

View source data.
View source data.
View source data.

== Vital statistics ==
	Average population (1 Jan)	Live births	Deaths	Natural change	Crude birth rate (per 1000)	Crude death rate (per 1000)	Natural change (per 1000)	Crude migration rate (per 1000)	Total fertility rate	Male life expectancy	Female life expectancy
1966	13,123,000	667,000			50.8						
1967	13,497,000	630,000	214,000	416,000	50.1	15.9	34.2	-6.5			
1968	13,887,000	618,000	241,000	377,000	47.7	17.4	30.3	-2.2			
1969	14,287,000	665,000	243,000	422,000	49.8	17.0	32.8	-4.8			
1970	14,691,000	689,000	226,000	463,000	50.2	16.5	33.7	-6.2			
1971	15,098,000	687,000	241,000	446,000	48.4	17.0	31.4	-4.4			
1972	15,512,000	697,000	229,000	468,000	47.7	15.7	32.0	-5.3			
1973	15,936,000	717,000	246,000	471,000	47.6	16.3	31.3	-4.7			
1974	16,375,000	722,000	234,000	488,000	46.5	15.1	31.4	-4.6			
1975	16,834,000	738,000	249,000	489,000	46.1	15.5	30.6	-3.3			
1976	17,311,000	751,000	258,000	493,000	45.4	15.6	29.8	-2.2			
1977	17,809,000	796,000	241,000	555,000	45.0	14.4	30.6	-2.6			
1978	18,331,000	817,000	238,000	579,000	46.4	13.5	32.9	-4.4			
1979	18,885,000	774,000	212,000	562,000	42.8	11.7	31.1	-1.8			
1980	19,475,000	797,000	203,000	594,000	42.7	10.9	31.8	-1.5			
1981	20,104,000	791,000	178,000	613,000	41.0	9.4	31.6	-0.3			
1982	20,767,000	808,000	180,000	628,000	40.6	9.1	31.5	0.4			
1983	21,453,000	830,000	181,000	649,000	40.4	8.8	31.6	0.4			
1984	22,150,000	850,000	173,000	677,000	40.2	8.6	31.6	-0.1			
1985	22,847,000	864,000	183,000	681,000	39.5	8.4	31.1	-0.6			
1986	23,539,000	781,000	165,000	616,000	34.7	7.3	27.4	2.0			
1987	24,226,000	755,000	161,000	594,000	34.6	7.0	27.6	0.8			
1988	24,905,000	806,000	157,000	649,000	33.9	6.6	27.3	0			
1989	25,577,000	755,000	153,000	602,000	31.0	6.0	25.0	1.3			
1990	25,022,000	775,000	151,000	624,000	30.9	6.0	24.9	-47.1	4.50		
1991	25,643,000	773,000	155,000	618,000	30.1	6.0	24.1	0.1			
1992	26,271,000	799,000	160,000	639,000	30.4	6.1	24.3	-0.4			
1993	26,894,000	775,000	168,000	607,000	28.8	6.2	22.6	0.6			
1994	27,496,000	776,000	180,000	596,000	28.2	6.5	21.7	0.2			
1995	28,060,000	711,000	180,000	531,000	25.3	6.4	18.9	1.2			
1996	28,566,000	654,000	172,000	482,000	22.9	6.0	16.9	0.8			
1997	29,045,000	654,000	178,000	476,000	22.5	6.1	16.4	0.1			
1998	29,507,000	607,000	144,000	463,000	20.6	4.9	15.7	0			
1999	29,965,000	593,643	141,000	452,643	19.8	4.7	15.1	0.2			
2000	30,416,000	588,628	140,000	448,628	19.4	4.6	14.8	0	2.40		
2001	30,879,000	618,380	141,000	477,380	20.0	4.6	15.5	-0.5			
2002	31,357,000	616,963	138,000	478,963	19.7	4.4	15.3	-0.1	2.48		
2003	31,848,000	649,000	145,000	504,000	20.4	4.6	15.8	-0.4	2.53		
2004	32,364,000	669,000	141,000	528,000	20.7	4.4	16.3	-0.4			
2005	32,906,000	703,000	147,000	556,000	21.4	4.5	16.9	-0.4	2.52		
2006	33,481,000	739,000	144,000	595,000	22.1	4.3	17.8	-0.6			
2007	34,096,000	783,000	149,000	634,000	23.0	4.4	18.6	-0.6		74.7	76.8
2008	34,591,000	817,000	153,000	664,000	23.6	4.4	19.2	-4.9	2.81	74.8	76.4
2009	35,268,000	849,000	159,000	690,000	24.1	4.5	19.6	-0.4	2.84	74.7	76.3
2010	35,978,000	888,000	157,000	731,000	24.7	4.4	20.3	-0.6	2.87	75.6	77.0
2011	36,717,000	910,000	162,000	748,000	24.8	4.4	20.4	-0.3	2.87	75.6	77.4
2012	37,495,000	978,000	170,000	808,000	26.1	4.5	21.6	-0.9	3.02	75.8	77.1
2013	38,297,000	963,000	168,000	795,000	25.1	4.4	20.7	0.2	2.93	76.5	77.6
2014	39,114,000	1,014,000	174,000	840,000	25.9	4.4	21.5	-0.6	3.03	76.6	77.8
2015	39,963,000	1,040,285	182,570	857,715	26.0	4.6	21.4	-0.2	3.09	76.4	77.8
2016	40,836,000	1,066,823	180,404	886,419	26.1	4.5	21.6	-0.2	3.13	77.1	78.2
2017	41,721,000	1,060,000	190,000	870,000	25.4	4.6	20.8	0.4	3.13	76.9	78.2
2018	42,578,000	1,038,000	193,000	845,000	24.4	4.5	19.9	0.2	2.97	77.1	78.4
2019	43,424,000	1,034,000	198,000	837,000	23.8	4.6	19.2	0.3	2.99	77.2	78.6
2020	44,241,000	988,209	241,069	747,140	22.3	5.4	16.9	1.4	2.8	74.2	77.9
2021	44,938,000	949,799	258,491	691,308	21.1	5.8	15.4	-8.8	2.7	74.4	77.2
2022	45,477,000	915,223	203,146	712,077	20.1	4.5	15.6	-9.8	2.59(e)	77.0	80.0
2023	46,189,163	895,140	192,186	702,954	19.3	4.1	15.2	0.1	2.52(e)	78.2	81.0
2024	46,891,000	873,000(e)			18.5				2.44(e)?		
2025		855,000 (e)							2.37 (e)		

=== Fertility ===
Years	1925	1926	1927	1928	1929	1930	1931	1932	1933	1934
Total Fertility Rate in Algeria	6.99	7.02	7.05	7.07	7.10	7.12	7.15	7.18	7.20	7.23

Years	1935	1936	1937	1938	1939	1940	1941	1942	1943	1944
Total Fertility Rate in Algeria	7.26	7.28	7.31	7.33	7.36	7.39	7.41	7.44	7.46	7.49

Years	1945	1946	1947	1948	1949
Total Fertility Rate in Algeria	7.52	7.54	7.57	7.59	7.62

=== Life expectancy ===
Life expectancy in Algeria since 1923

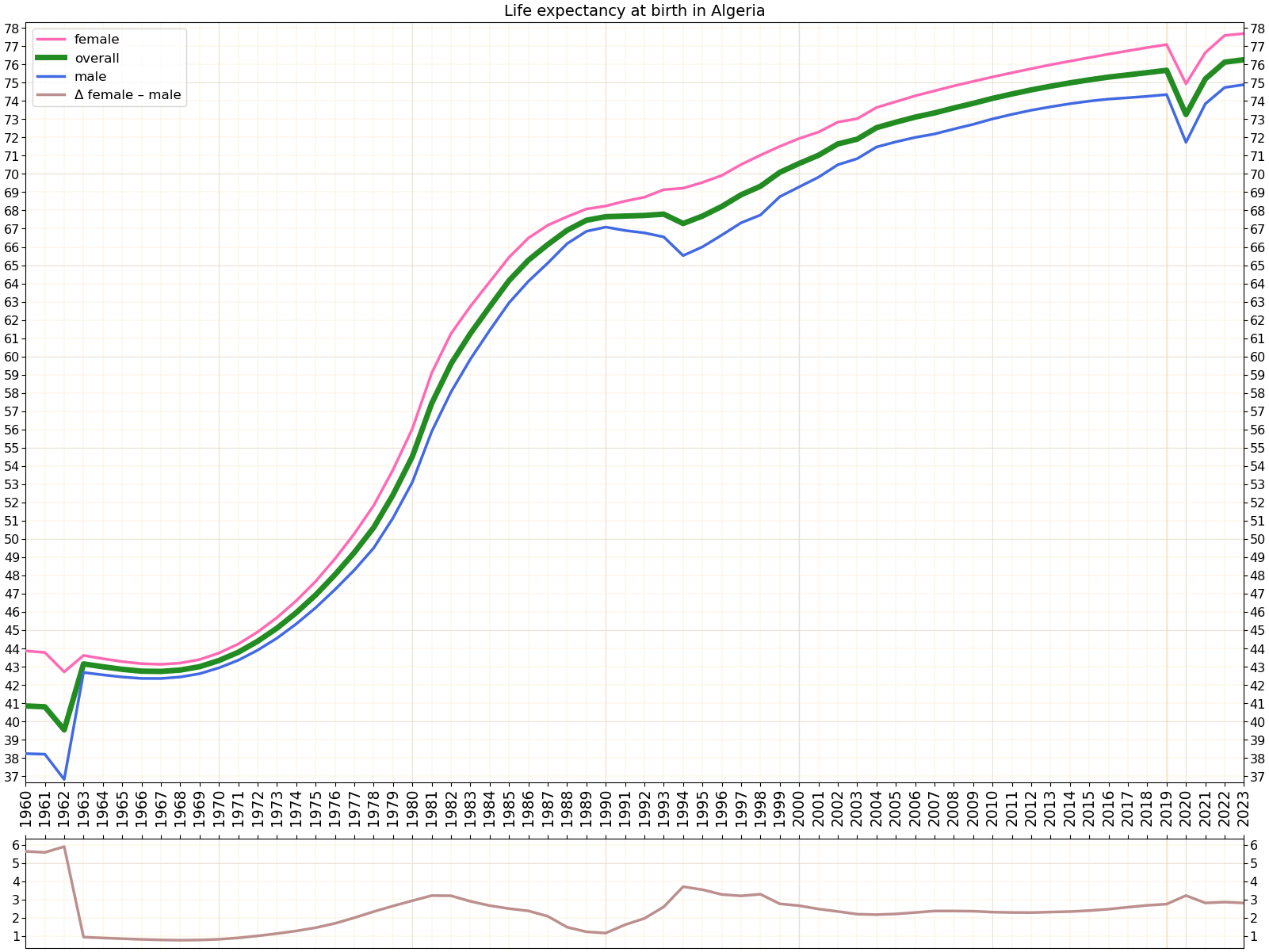
Life expectancy in Algeria since 1960 by gender

Period	Life expectancy in Years
1950–1955	42.89
1955–1960	▲45.00
1960–1965	▲47.29
1965–1970	▲49.47
1970–1975	▲51.48
1975–1980	▲54.93
1980–1985	▲61.57
1985–1990	▲65.85
1990–1995	▲67.20
1995–2000	▲69.14
2000–2005	▲71.50
2005–2010	▲73.88
2010–2015	▲75.27

== Ethnic groups ==
Ethnic groups in Algeria
1. Arabs (73.6%)
2. Berbers (23.2%)
3. Arabized Berbers (3.00%)
4. Others (0.20%)

Arabs make up 73.6% of the population of Algeria, Berbers make up 23.2%, Arabized Berbers make up 3%, and others constitute 0.2%. Phoenicians, Romans, Byzantines, Arabs, Turks as well as other ethnic groups have contributed to the ethnic makeup and genetic structure of the Algerian population. Descendants of Andalusian refugees are also present in the population of Algiers and other cities. Moreover, Spanish was spoken by these Aragonese and Castilian Morisco descendants deep into the 18th century, and even Catalan was spoken at the same time by Catalan Morisco descendants in the small town of Grish El-Oued.

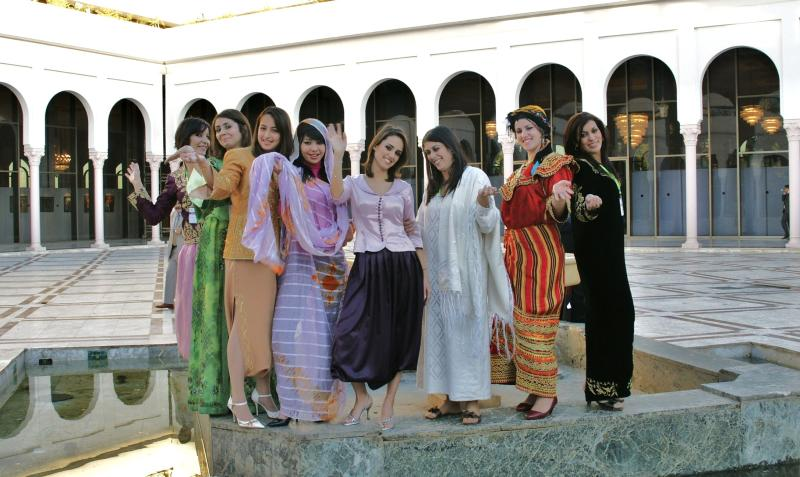
Algerian women in traditional clothes

The Arab population of Algeria is a result of the inflow of sedentary and nomadic Arab tribes from Arabia since the Muslim conquest of the Maghreb in the 7th century with a major wave in the 11th century. The majority of Algerians identify with an Arab-based culture. The ethnic Berbers are divided into many groups with varying languages. The largest of these are the Kabyles, who live in the Kabylia region east of Algiers, the Chaoui of North-East Algeria, the Tuaregs in the southern desert and the Shenwa people of North Algeria.

During the colonial period, there was a large (15% in 1960) European population who became known as Pied-Noirs. They were primarily of French, Spanish and Italian origin. Almost all of this population left during the war of independence or immediately after its end.

=== Genetics ===
==== Y-DNA frequencies in coastal Algeria ====
Population	Nb	E1a	E1b1a	E1b1b1a	E1b1b1b	E1b1b1c	F	K	J1	J2	R1a	R1b	Q	Study
1 Oran	102	0	7.85%	5.90%	45.10%	0	0	0	22.50%	4.90%	1%	11.80%	1%	Robino et al. (2008)
2 Algiers	35	2.85%	0	11.40%	42.85%	0	11.80%	2.85%	22.85%	5.70%	0	0	0	Arredi et al. (2004)
3 Tizi Ouzou	19	0	0	0	47.35%	10.50%	10.50%	0	15.80%	0	0	15.80%	0	Arredi et al. (2004)
Total	156	0.65%	5.10%	6.40%	44.90%	1.30%	9.58%	0.65%	21.80%	4.50%	0.65%	9.60%	0.65%	

In a recent genetic study by Semino et al. (2004), the Haplogroup J1 associated with the diffusion of Arabs was found at 35% in Algeria, which is one of the most common haplogroups in Algeria, like the rest of the Maghreb, along with E1b1b.

Recent studies on the common J1 Y chromosome suggest it arrived over 10,000 years ago in North Africa, and M81/E3b2 is a Y chromosome specific to North African ancestry, dating to the Neolithic. A thorough study by Arredi et al. (2004) which analyzed populations from Algeria concludes that the North African pattern of Y-chromosomal variation (including both E3b2 and J haplogroups is largely of Neolithic origin, which suggests that the Neolithic transition in this part of the world was accompanied by demic diffusion of Afro-Asiatic–speaking pastoralists from the Middle East. This Neolithic origin was later confirmed by Myles et al. (2005) which suggest that "contemporary Berber populations possess the genetic signature of a past migration of pastoralists from the Middle East", although later papers have suggested that this date could have been as longas ten thousand years ago, with the transition from the Oranian to the Capsian culture in North Africa.

== Languages ==
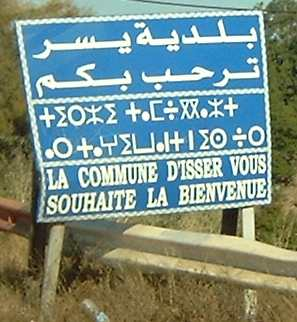
Traffic sign in Isser in three languages: Arabic, Berber, and French

Arabic and Berber serve as both official languages and national languages in Algeria.

Algerian Arabic (Algerian Dziriya or Darja) is the language used by the majority of the population. Colloquial Algerian Arabic has many Berber and French loanwords.

Although French has no official status, Algeria is the second-largest Francophone country in the world in terms of speakers, and French is widely used in government, media (newspapers, radio, local television), and both the education system (from primary school onwards) and academia due to Algeria's colonial history. It can be regarded as the de facto co-official language of Algeria. In 2008, 11.2 million Algerians could read and write in French. An Abassa Institute study in April 2000 found that 60% of households could speak and understand French. In recent decades the government has reinforced the study of French and TV programs have reinforced use of the language.

Algeria emerged as a bilingual state after 1962. Colloquial Arabic is spoken by about 83% of the population and Berber by 27.4%.

=== Official and recognized languages ===
- Modern Standard Arabic: official language of the state.
- Berber language (Tamazight): official language of the state.

=== Spoken and popular languages ===
- Arabic language: 83% (dialectal Algerian Arabic including all dialects: Eastern, Western, Algiers dialect, Saharan)
- French: 70% (as a 2nd or 3rd language, spoken by both low and highly educated people)
- Berber languages: 27.4% Chaouia, Kabyle, Tamahaq, Chenoua, Mozabite (Tumẓabt)
- English: 15% (as a 3rd language, spoken by highly educated people)
- Korandje language (Kwarandzyey): 0.01%

== Religion ==
Religions of Algeria (2020)
Religions	percent
Islam (official; Sunni)	99%
Other (includes Christian and Jewish)	1%

Islam is the predominant religion with 99% of the population. There are about 150,000 Ibadis in the M'zab Valley in the region of Ghardaia.

There were an estimated 10,000 Christians in Algeria in 2008. In a 2009 study the UNO estimated there were 45,000 Catholics and 50,000–100,000 Protestants in Algeria. A 2015 study estimates 380,000 Muslims converted to Christianity in Algeria.
