= Cheb Aziz =

Algerian musician (1968–1996)

Cheb Aziz (bechiri Boudjema )
- Born: constantine 1968
- Died: 20 September 1996 (aged 27–28) Constantine, Algeria
- Genres: Staifi, Chaoui
- Occupations: Singer, songwriter
- Instrument: Vocals
- Years active: 19??–1996

Cheb Aziz born Bechiri Boudjema (1968 – 20 September 1996) was an Algerian musician and performer. Aziz was a very popular singer and performer across North Africa. He played Algerian musical genres such as Staifi and Chaoui.

== Personal life ==
Aziz was married to the singer Selma. She gave birth to their daughter Manel in December 1994.

== Death ==
On 20 September 1996, Aziz was killed by Islamist terrorists. He was the fourth singer to be found murdered, as music was declared blasphemous and banned in areas dominated by Islamic fundamentalists. Islamist militants had classified the Raï genre of music of consisting subjects relating to sex and drinking.
