= Tabouna bread =

Tunisian bread

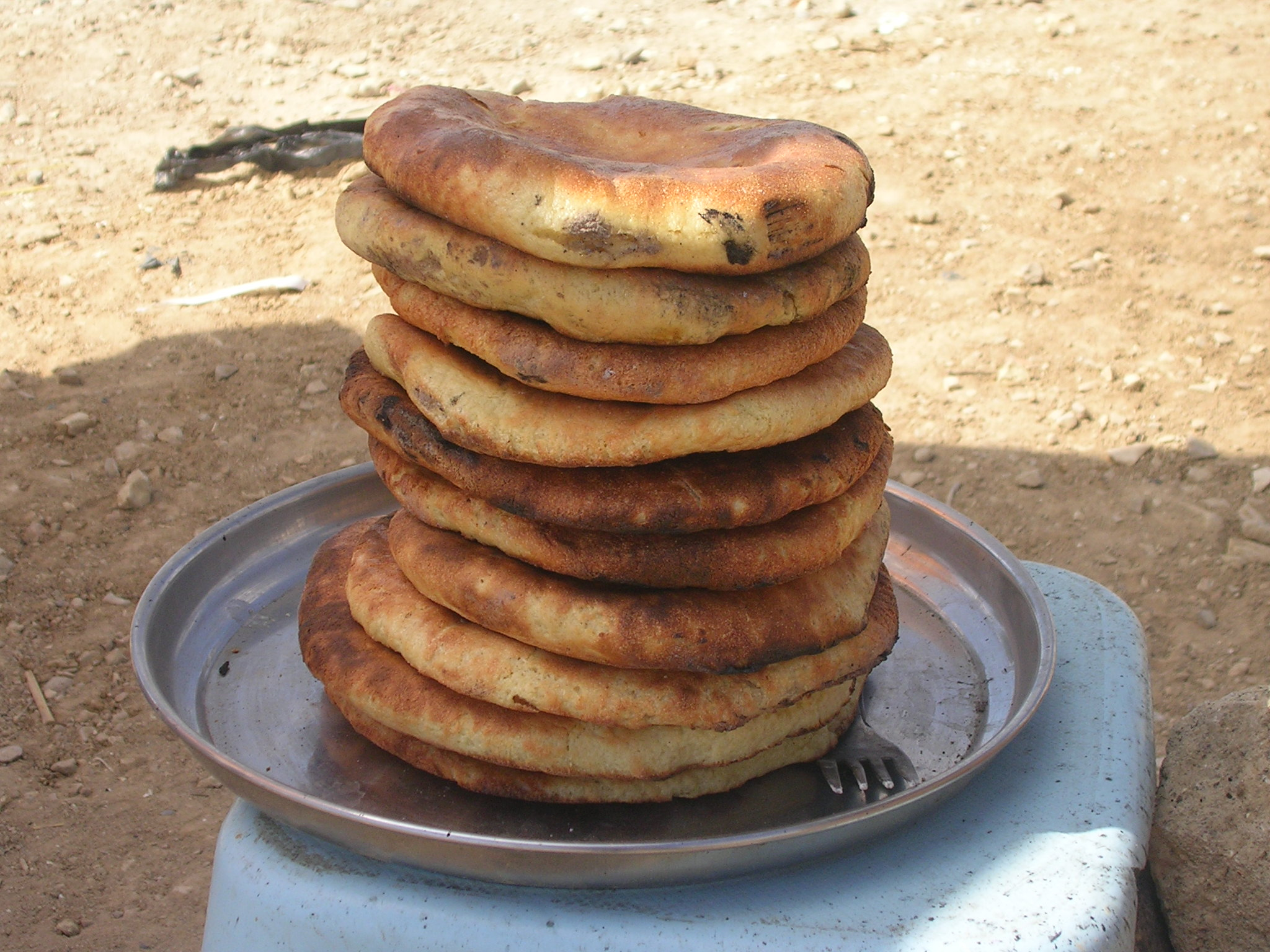
- Tabouna breads.
- Alternative names: Jardga or Jerdga
- Course: Side dish
- Place of origin: Tunisia
- Region or state: Tunisia
- Associated cuisine: Tunisian
- Similar dishes: Kesra (bread)

Tabouna bread is an artisanal Tunisian bread baked against the inner walls of a traditional terracotta oven, which is itself called a *tabouna*.

== Etymology ==
The name *ṭabuna* (طابونة) comes from the Arabic word *ṭabun* (or طابون), referring to the fire hearth, derived from the verb *ṭabana* (طبن), meaning "to stoke the fire".

The *tabouna* can go by different regional names. For instance, in northwestern Tunisia—such as in Béja, Jendouba and Kef governorates—this bread is called *jardga* or *jerdga* (singular) and *jredeg* for plural, while the *tabouna* oven itself is called *guja* (or *gouja*).

== Preparation ==
Made from flour, *tabouna* bread has a round, relatively flat shape. It is most often topped with sesame seeds. Kneading the dough is often described as the most important step in this recipe.

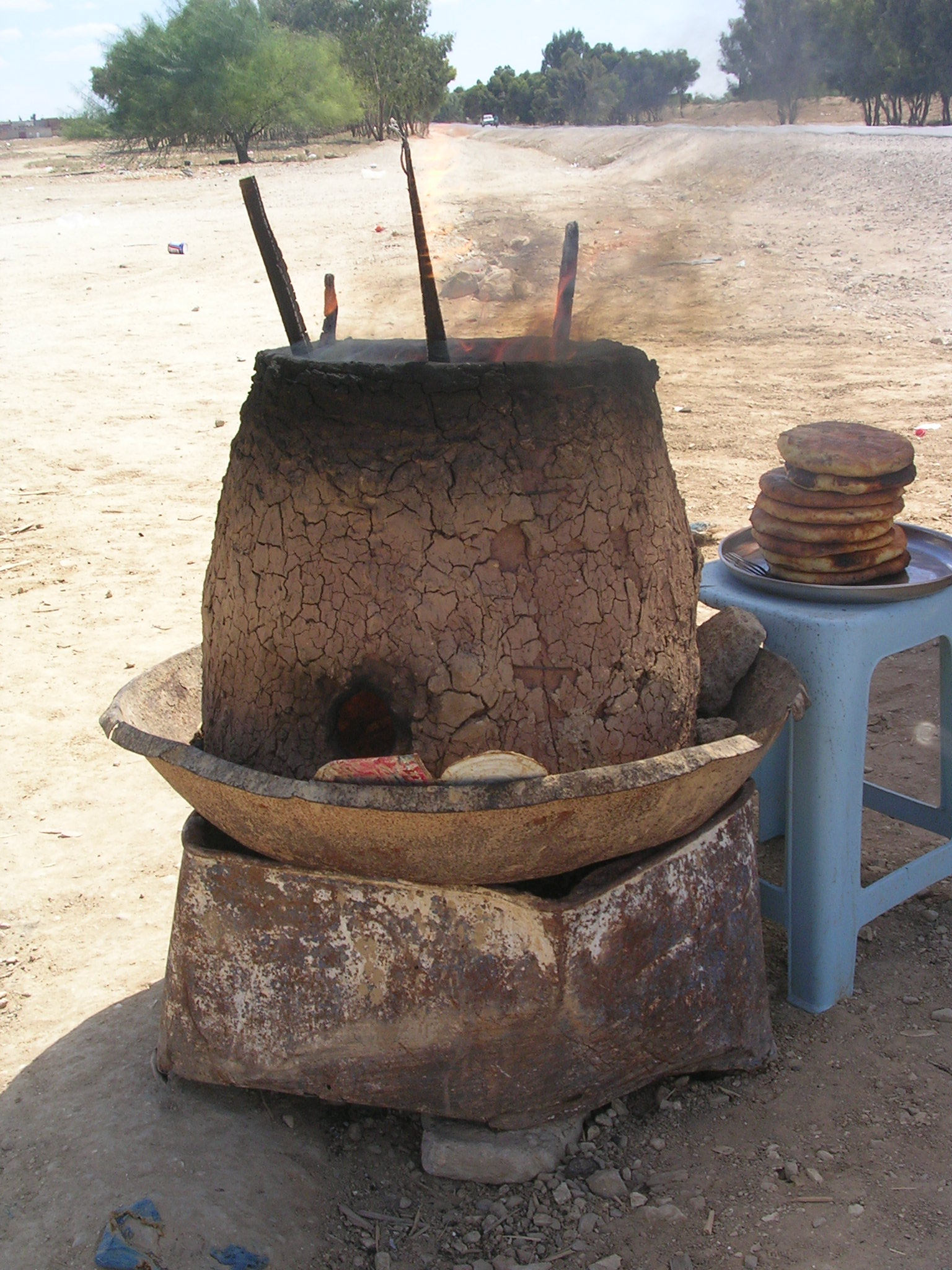
Tabouna (traditional clay oven) used for baking bread.

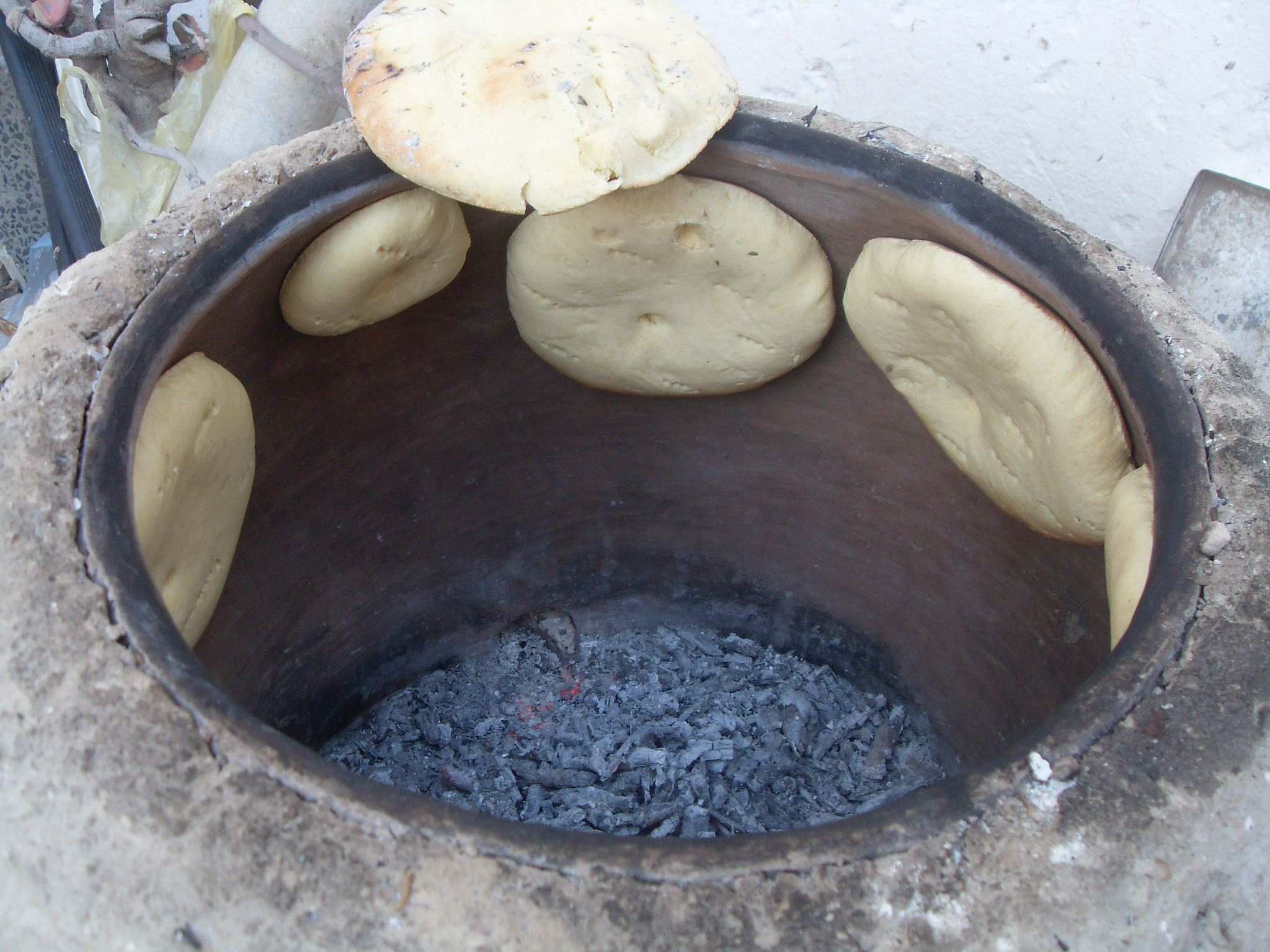
Loaves inside the oven.
