= Harcha =

Moroccan semolina flatbread

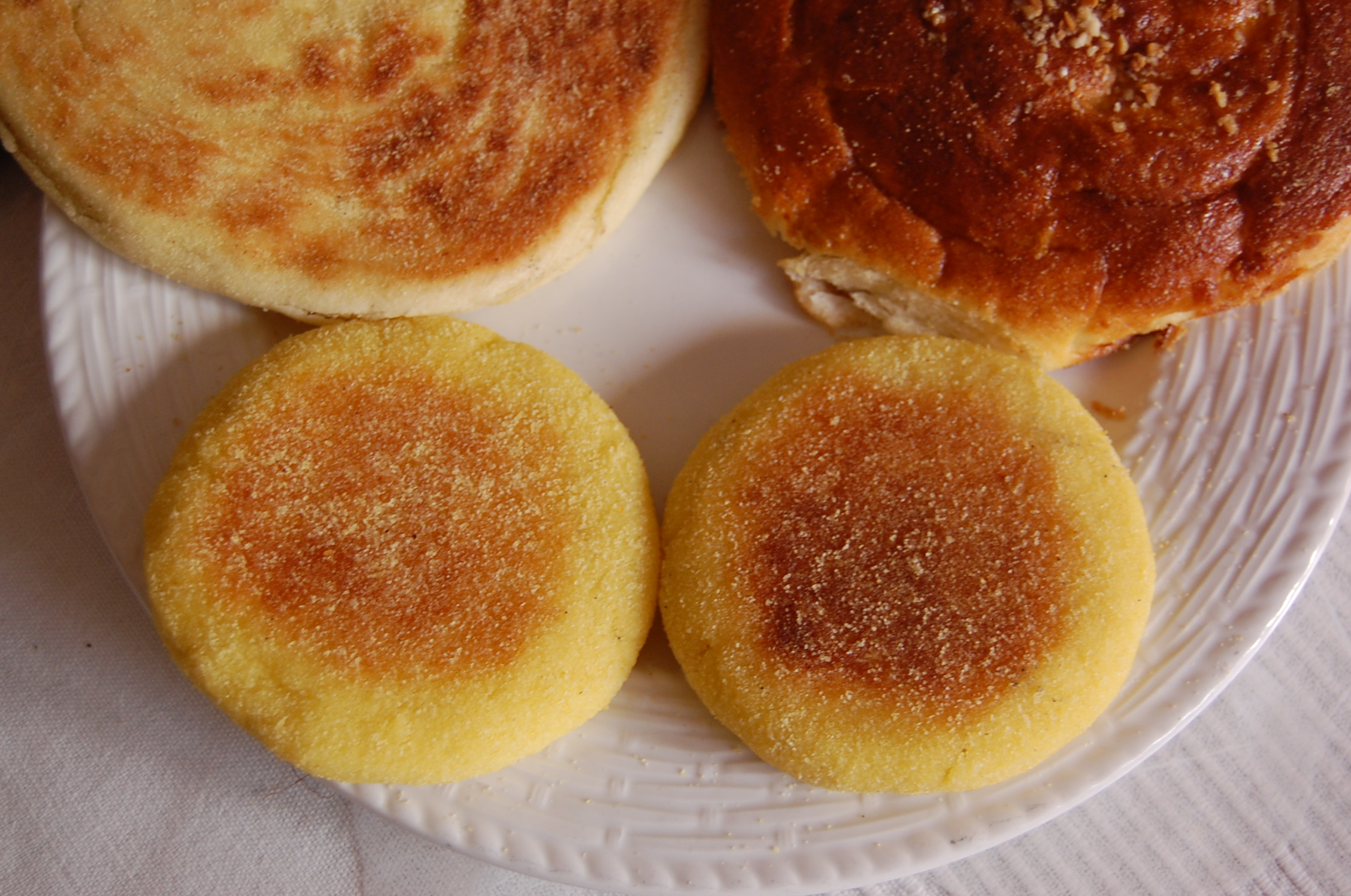
- Type: Flatbread
- Place of origin: Morocco
- Main ingredients: Semolina flour, butter, water or milk, baking powder

Harcha or harsha (Arabic: حرشة, romanized: ḥarša) is a griddle- or pan-cooked semolina flatbread native to the Middle Atlas in Morocco. It is also found in Algeria.

== Preparation ==
The cakes are made from a dough of semolina, butter, and milk or water, and leavened with baking powder. The dough may also contain some sugar. The dough is formed into rounds and then cooked on a hot griddle or flat pan. The use of semolina gives harcha a crumbly texture comparable to cornbread. In the Rif, Morocco, buttermilk or yogurt, thinned with water, can be used instead of milk. Harcha can be made into small breads, or large ones the size of a truck tire.

== Serving culture ==
Harcha is commonly smeared with honey and butter, and served with mint tea during breakfast or as a snack. It is also one of the breads consumed during Ramadan. It can also be served like a sandwich, stuffed with cheese or with meat confit. It can be crumbled and used as a tender bed for stew.

== Variants ==
Terminology for the bread may vary across Morocco and Algeria. Agronomy specialist Mike Sissons for example mentions the term "mbesses" as a variant of harcha. Mbesses however may instead refer to a sweet cake found in Algeria, also called Khobz Mbesses which has similar but not identical ingredients.

In the rural hinterland of Algiers, it is commonly called harchâya, and the term ragda is used elsewhere in Algeria.

In the late 19th century, Algerian bakers created a type of bread called El Khobz El Harcha, which was made by sprinkling semolina on the bread before putting it in the oven. This is clearly different from and should not be confused with Harcha, which is entirely made from semolina flour and other ingredients such as milk.

== See also ==
- Moroccan cuisine
- Algerian cuisine
- List of pancakes
