= La Nouba des femmes du Mont Chenoua =

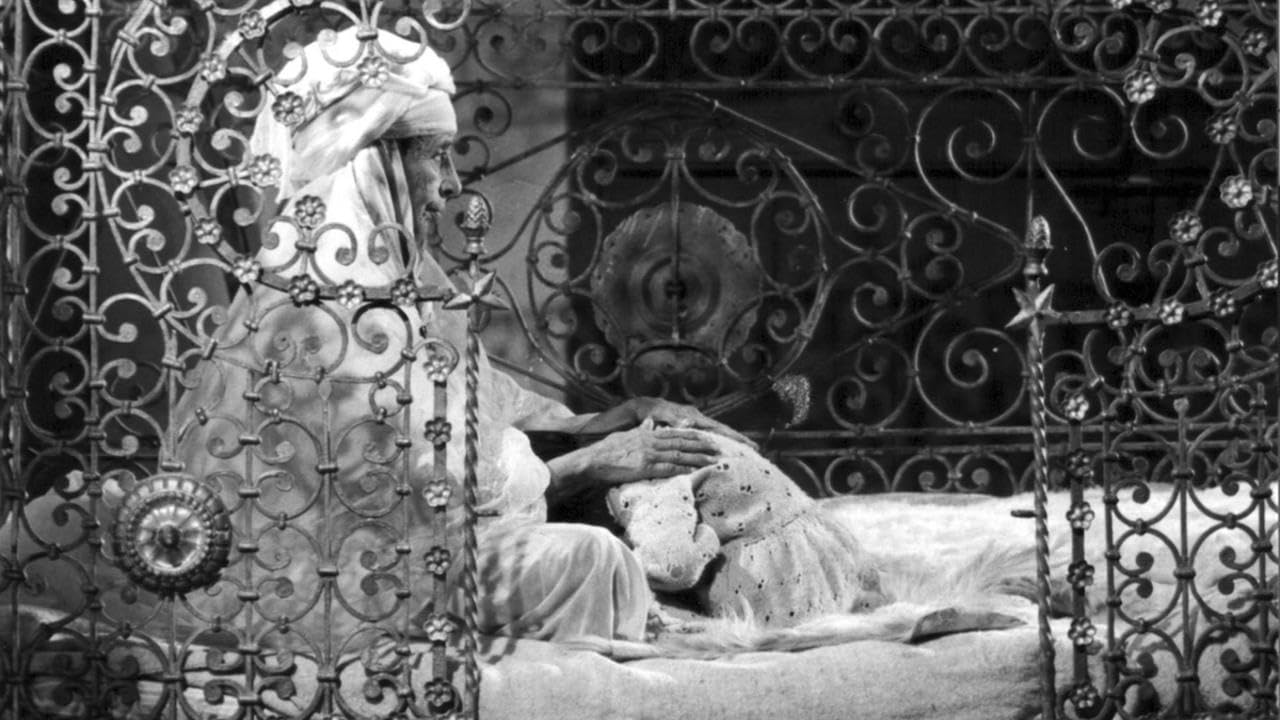
- Directed by: Assia Djebbar
- Written by: Assia Djebbar
- Produced by: Ahmed Sedjane, Cherif Abboun, Hamni Farid
- Cinematography: Ahmed Sedjane, Cherif Abboun
- Edited by: Nicole Schlemmer, Areski Haddadi
- Music by: Béla Bartók
- Production company: Radio Télévision Algérienne
- Release date: 1977
- Running time: 115 minutes
- Country: Algeria
- Languages: Arabic, French

La Nouba des femmes du Mont Chenoua (English: The Nubah of the Women of Mount Chenoua) is a 1979 Algerian documentary film directed by Assia Djebar. The film was the first of two films directed by Djebar during her decade-long hiatus from writing, produced outside of Algerian filmmaking circles.

The accompanying soundtrack was composed by Hungarian Béla Bartók, who visited in Algeria in 1913 to study popular music. The film is dedicated to the musician, as well as to Zoulikha Oudai (born Yamina Echaïb), a heroine of Algerian colonial resistance to whom Djebar also dedicated La Femme sans sépulture four decades later.

The film borrows the structure and takes the title of nubah, a traditional Andalusian music form composed of five parts.

The documentary sparked debate in Algeria, and was screened in Carthage in 1978 and at the Venice Film Festival a year later, where it won the International Critics' Prize. It is a work studied in many American universities. Only one existing digital copy of the film remains.

== Synopsis ==
Shot in the spring of 1976, the film features Lila, a thirty-year-old architect returning to her native region in the mountains of Chenoua, in the company of her daughter and her husband, whose legs were disabled after an accident. Between fiction, documentary images and literary incursions, Djebar's first film documents and orchestrates an incessant back and forth between memory, history and the present, focusing on women during the resistance.

== Cast ==
- Zohra Sahraoui
- Aïcha Medeljar
- Fatma Serhan
- Kheira Amrane
- Fatma Oudai
- Khedija Lekhal
- Noweir Sawsan
