= Mount Chenoua =

Mountain in Algeria

Mount Chenoua Adrar en Cenwa / جبل شنوة
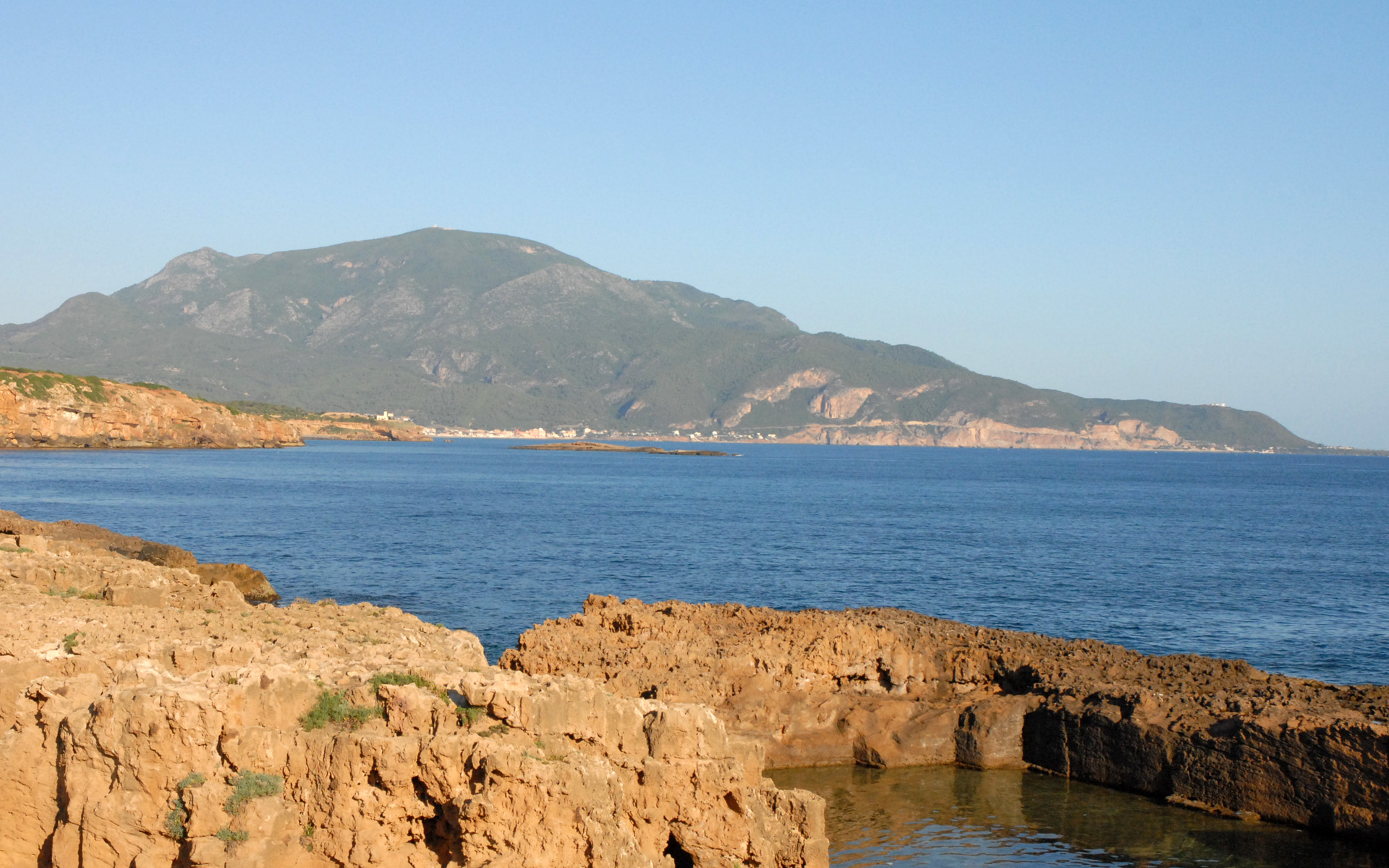
- View of Mount Chenoua

Highest point
- Elevation: 905 m (2,969 ft)
- Listing: List of mountains named The Sleeping Lady
- Coordinates: 36°36′23″N 2°22′21″E

Geography
- Location within Algeria
- Location: Tipaza, Algeria
- Parent range: Tell Atlas

Geology
- Orogeny: Alpine orogeny

Mount Chenoua (Berber: ⴰⴷⵔⴰⵔ ⵏ ⵉⵛⵏⵡⵉⵢⵏ, romanized: Adrar en Cenwa, Arabic: جبل شنوة) is a mountain range in northern Algeria. It is located between Cherchell and Tipaza on the Mediterranean coast, just west of Algiers. There are marble quarries on the side of the mountain.

== Description ==
There is a village on that mountain named Chenoua. A majority of its inhabitants speak a Berber language, the Shenwa Berber. According to local tradition the mountain range looks like a reclining pregnant woman from a certain distance.

Mount Chenoua is the site of Assia Djebar's film La Nouba des Femmes du Mont Chenoua. It also features prominently in Albert Camus' posthumously published novel, A Happy Death. There is also a Stone Eagle statue that was built in 1991.

== Chenoua in culture ==
- Albert Camus' novel A Happy Death
- La Nouba des femmes du mont Chenoua by Assia Djebar

== See also ==
- Geography of Algeria
- Dahra Mountains
- Chenoua people
