= Sidi Semiane =

Coordinates: 36°30′31″N 2°03′50″E

- Commune and town
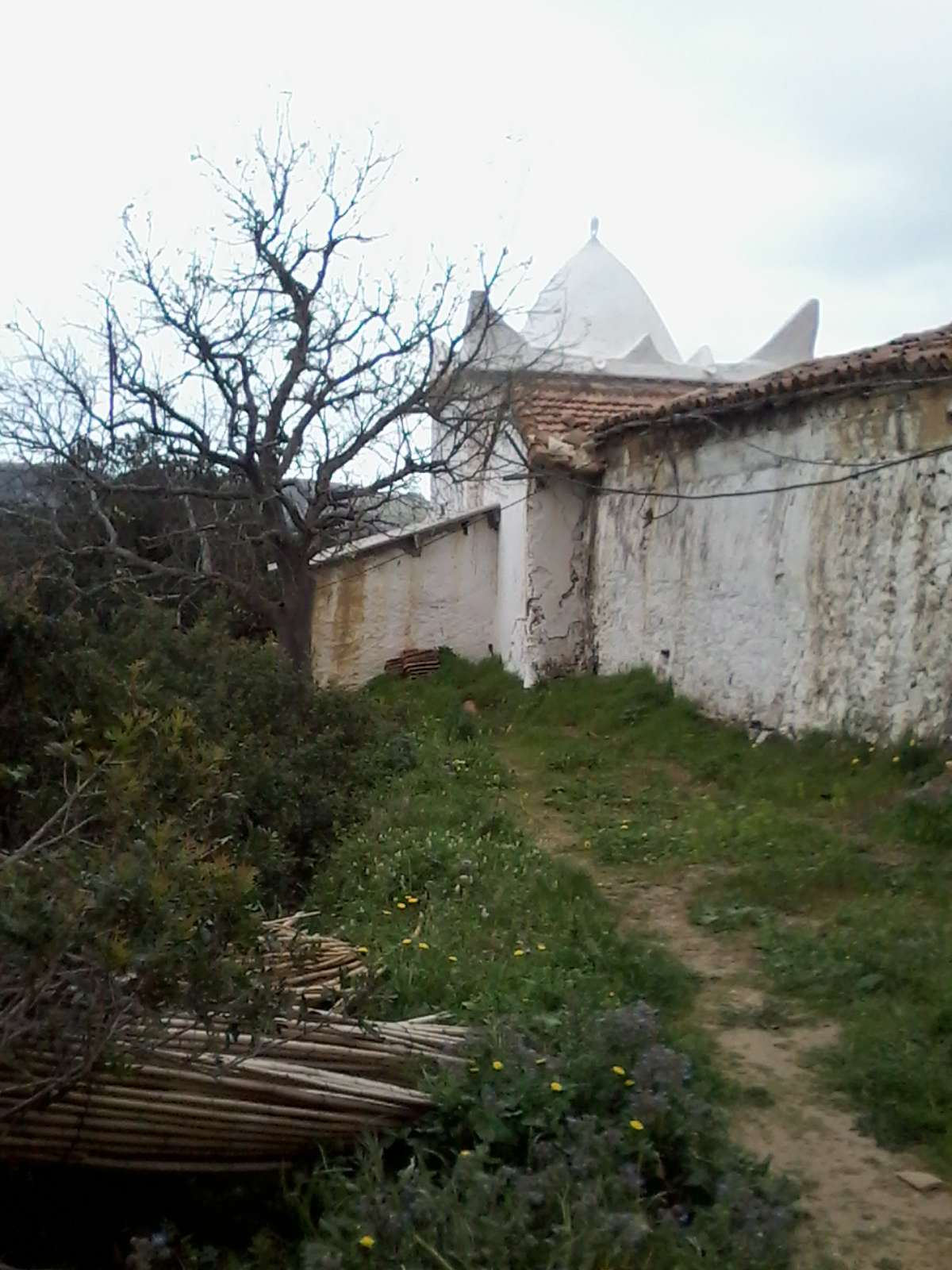

- Location of Sidi Semiane within Tipaza Province
- Country: Algeria
- Province: Tipaza Province
- Time zone: UTC+1 (CET)

Sidi Semiane is a town and commune in Tipaza Province in northern Algeria.

== See also ==
- Battle of Sidi Semiane
