= Mbesses =

Algerian pastry

Mbesses - مبسّس
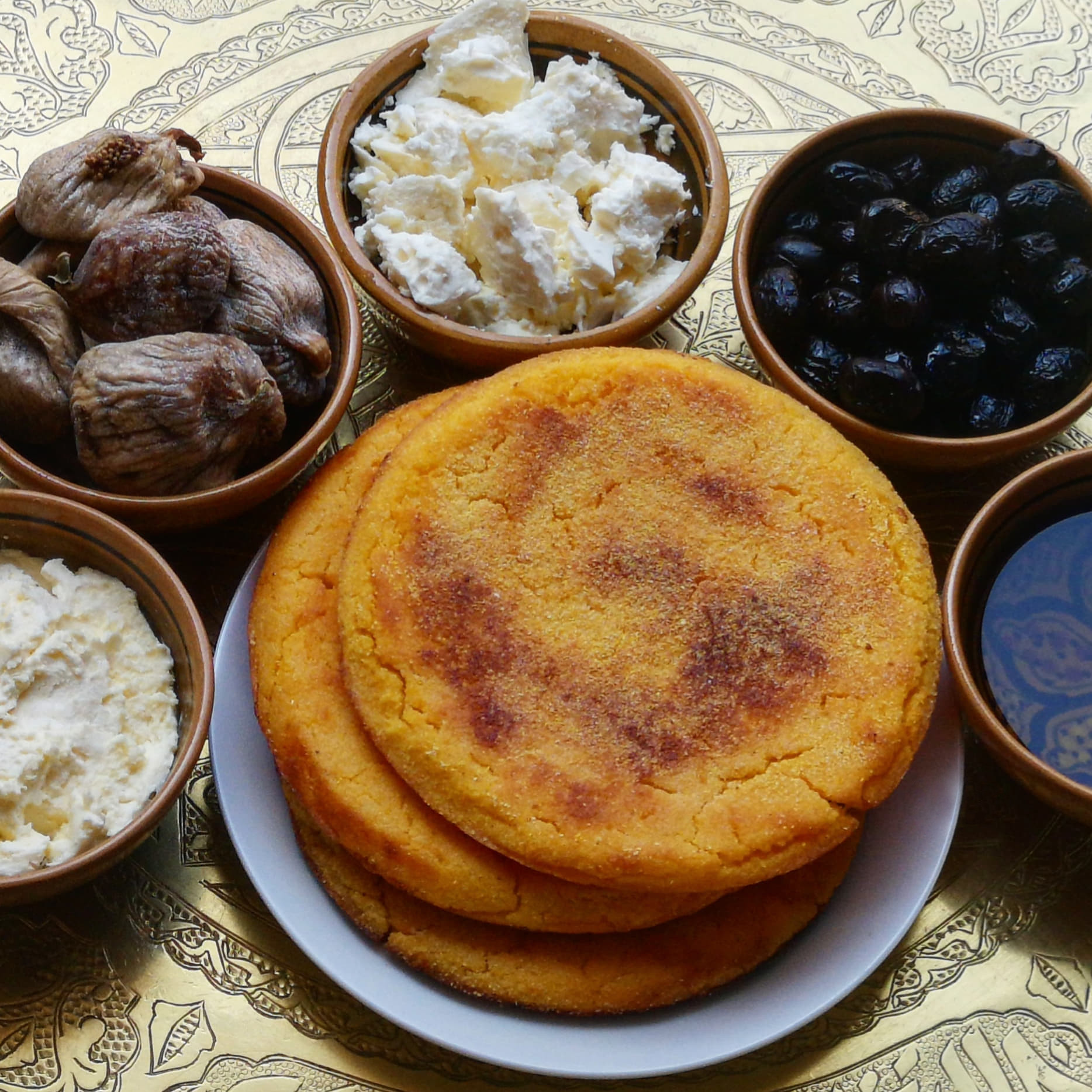
- Type: Bread
- Course: Dessert
- Place of origin: Algeria
- Associated cuisine: Algerian cuisine
- Main ingredients: Semolina and butter or Smen
- Similar dishes: Kesra

Mbesses (Arabic: مبسّس) or Mtaqba (Arabic: المتقبة) is an Algerian bread made from wheat semolina.

== See also ==
- List of cakes
- Algerian cuisine
