= Berber Socialism and Revolution Party =

Political party in Algeria

Berber Socialism and Revolution Party Akabar n Tagrawla d Tanemla Amazigh
- French name: Parti de la Révolution et du Socialisme Berbère
- Abbreviation: AKKA
- Founded: 2000
- Newspaper: Tanakra Tamazight
- Ideology: Berberism; Democratic socialism
- Colors: Blue; Green; Red; Yellow (Berber flag)

Website
- atta.no.sapo.pt

The Berber Socialism and Revolution Party (Berber languages: Akabar n Tagrawla d Tanemla Amazigh (AKKA), French: Parti de la Révolution et du Socialisme Berbère (PRSB)) is a Berberist Algerian party founded in 2000.

== History ==
The party was founded in 2000 under the name "Parti Socialiste Berbère de l'Algérie". Due to prohibition of political activity by Berber organizations, the party had to operate illegally.
