= Khobz el-dâr =

Type of leavened bread made in the Maghreb

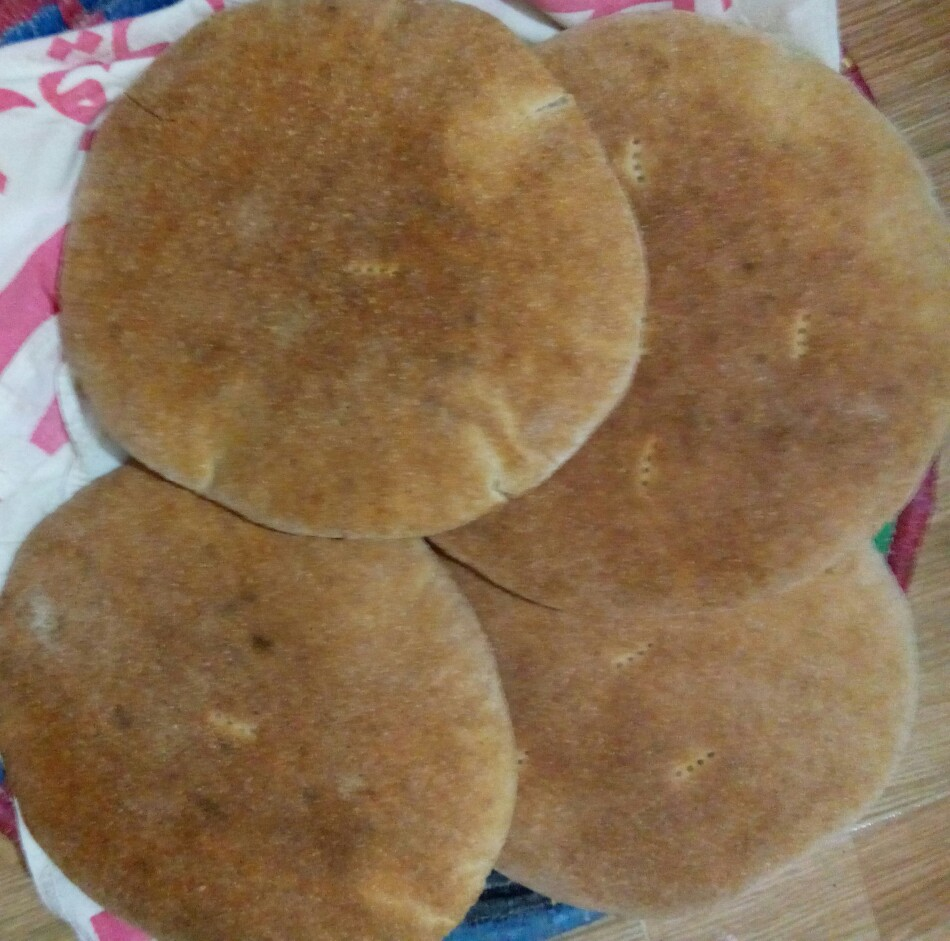
Khobz el-dâr

Khobz (Arabic: خبز, bread), khobz el-dâr (Arabic: خبز الدار, also "khobz eddar", bread of the house), or matloua (Arabic: مطلوع) is a type of Maghrebi leavened bread made in a round and somewhat flat loaf. It is often homemade, and typically prepared with white flour mixed with whole wheat or semolina flour. It is sometimes flavored with anise seeds. An oven-cooked version, also known as khobz el koucha (Arabic: خبز الكوشة) or matloua el koucha (Arabic: مطلوع الكوشة), is about an inch thick, and was traditionally prepared at home and then taken to a communal oven to be baked; some bakeries still offer this service. A thinner version, Khobz al-tajin (Arabic: خبز الطاجين), is cooked in an earthenware pan called tajine.

== See also ==
- List of breads
