= Zoulikha Oudai =

Algerian Chenouas intelligence operative

- زوليخة أوداي
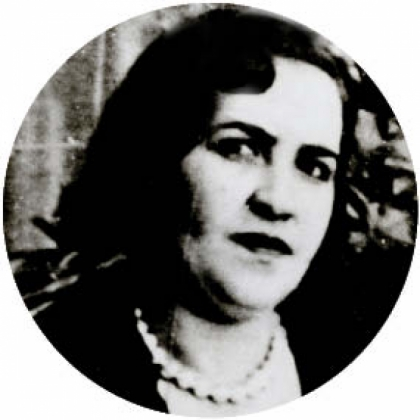
- Born: Yamina Echaïb; May 7, 1911; Hadjout
- Died: 1957
- Cause of death: Death flights
- Burial place: Menaceur
- Other name: Lalla Zoulikha Oudai
- Political party: FLN
- Children: 5
- Father: Zoulikha El Hadj Si Larbi Oudai

Zoulikha Oudai or Lalla Zoulikha Oudai was an Algerian Chenouas woman who was murdered by French forces during the Algerian War of Independence.

== Biography ==
Zoulikha Oudai was born 7 May 1911 in Hadjout, and grew up in Cherchell. She had five children; after her husband and one of her sons were executed by French forces, she became committed to the independence cause and joined the National Liberation Front (Algeria) as the Cherchell regional head. She then went underground and became a noted intelligence operative for the Front. She was captured by French forces in 1957 and executed after 10 days of unfruitful torture. Her body was not recovered until 1984; she is now interred in a martyrs' cemetery in Menaceur.
