= Nador, Tipaza =

Nador الناظور
- Commune and town
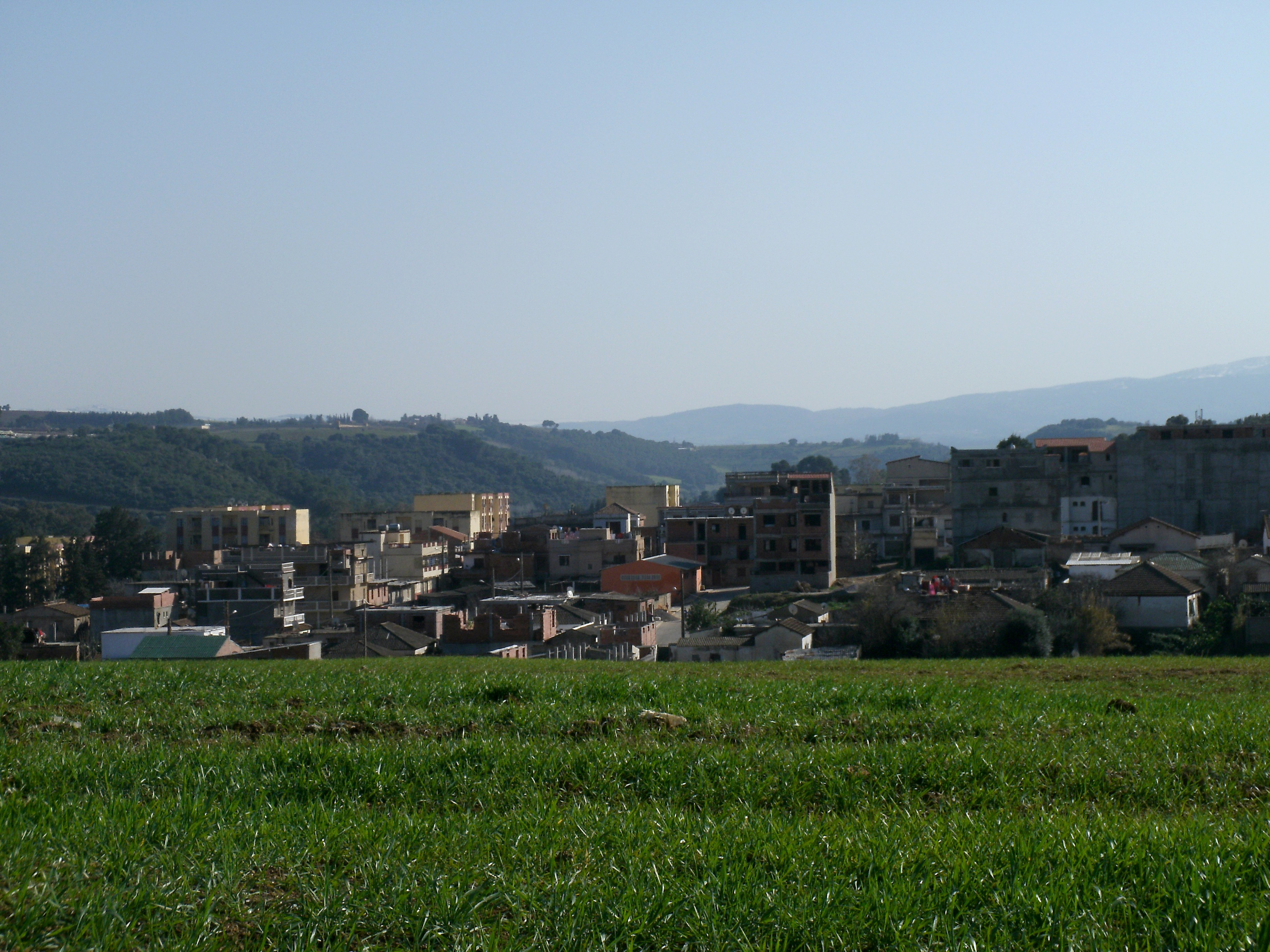
- Nador

- Location within Algeria
- Coordinates: 36.569769°N 2.39296°E
- Country: Algeria
- Province: Tipaza Province
- District: Sidi Amar District

Population (2008)
  - Total: 9,588
- Time zone: UTC+1 (CET)

Nador is a town and commune in Tipaza Province in northern Algeria.
