= Kesra (bread) =

Algerian bread

Algerian kesra
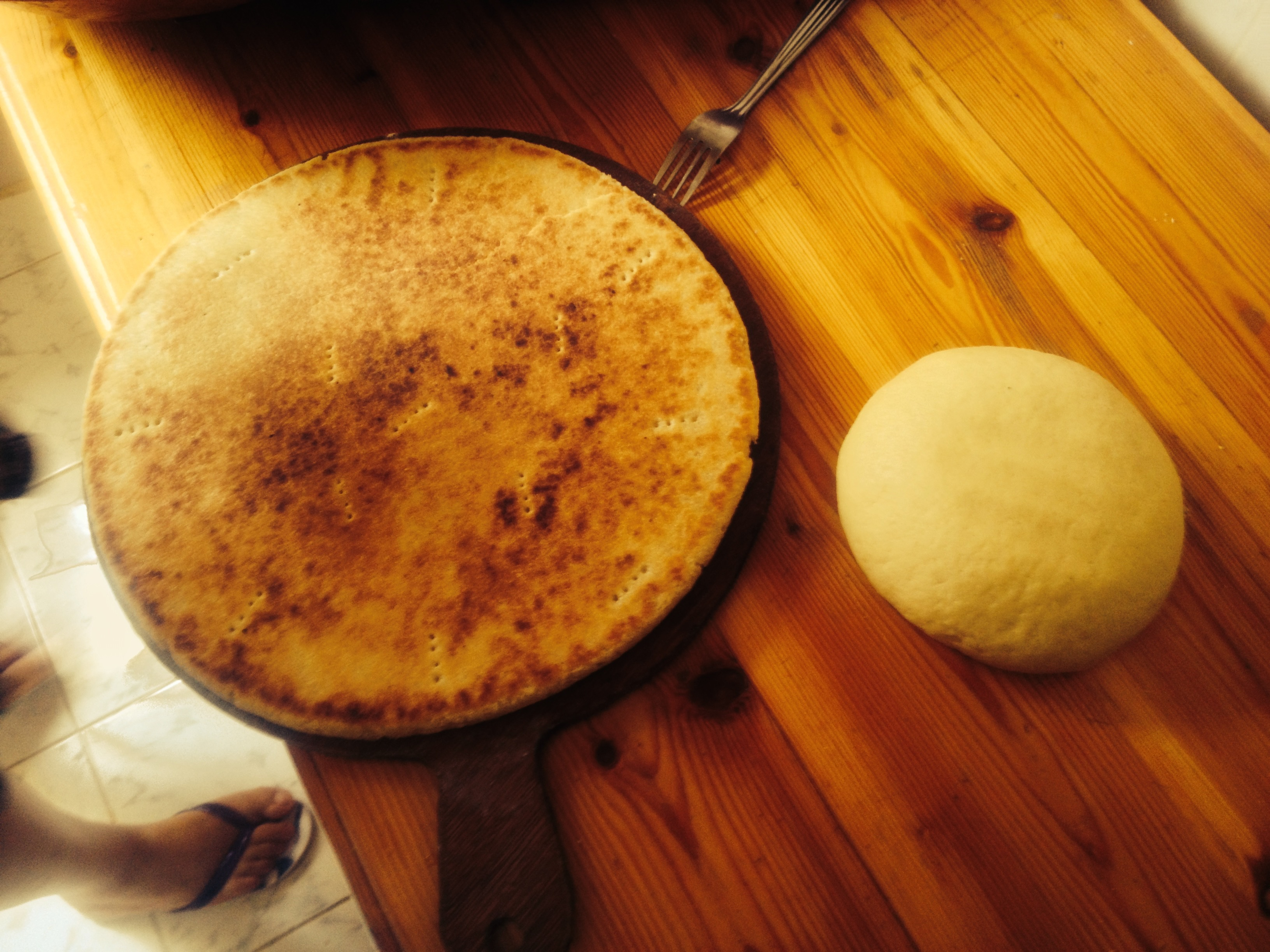
- Course: Side dish
- Place of origin: Algeria
- Similar dishes: Tabouna bread

Kesra (Arabic: كسرة) is a traditional Algerian bread made from semolina (wheat or sometimes barley). It is usually cooked on a flat grilling tajine over high heat. This bread can be eaten hot or cold, on its own or spread (with butter, jam, honey, etc.), stuffed or dipped in olive oil, accompanied by tajine, with different sorts of cheese. It can be served with fermented milk (leben) or curdled milk (raib).

Kesra is prepared with semolina, oil or melted butter, salt, and tepid water, possibly with, depending on the region, baker's yeast, nigella seeds, flower water. orange tree, etc.

Kesra is made all over Algeria, It is called khobz el ftir in Algiers, aɣrum n tajin in Kabylia, and arekhsas or arekhsis in the Aurès region.

== Origin ==
Traditional pancake with several variants in North Africa, Scipio Emilian described through Appian Massinissa eating it after the battle against the Carthaginians. The name kesra comes from the Arabic root meaning "to break", probably because the relatively firm patty is traditionally broken by hand into pieces instead of being cut with a knife.
