= Dahra Range =

Mountain range in northern Algeria

- جبال الظهرة
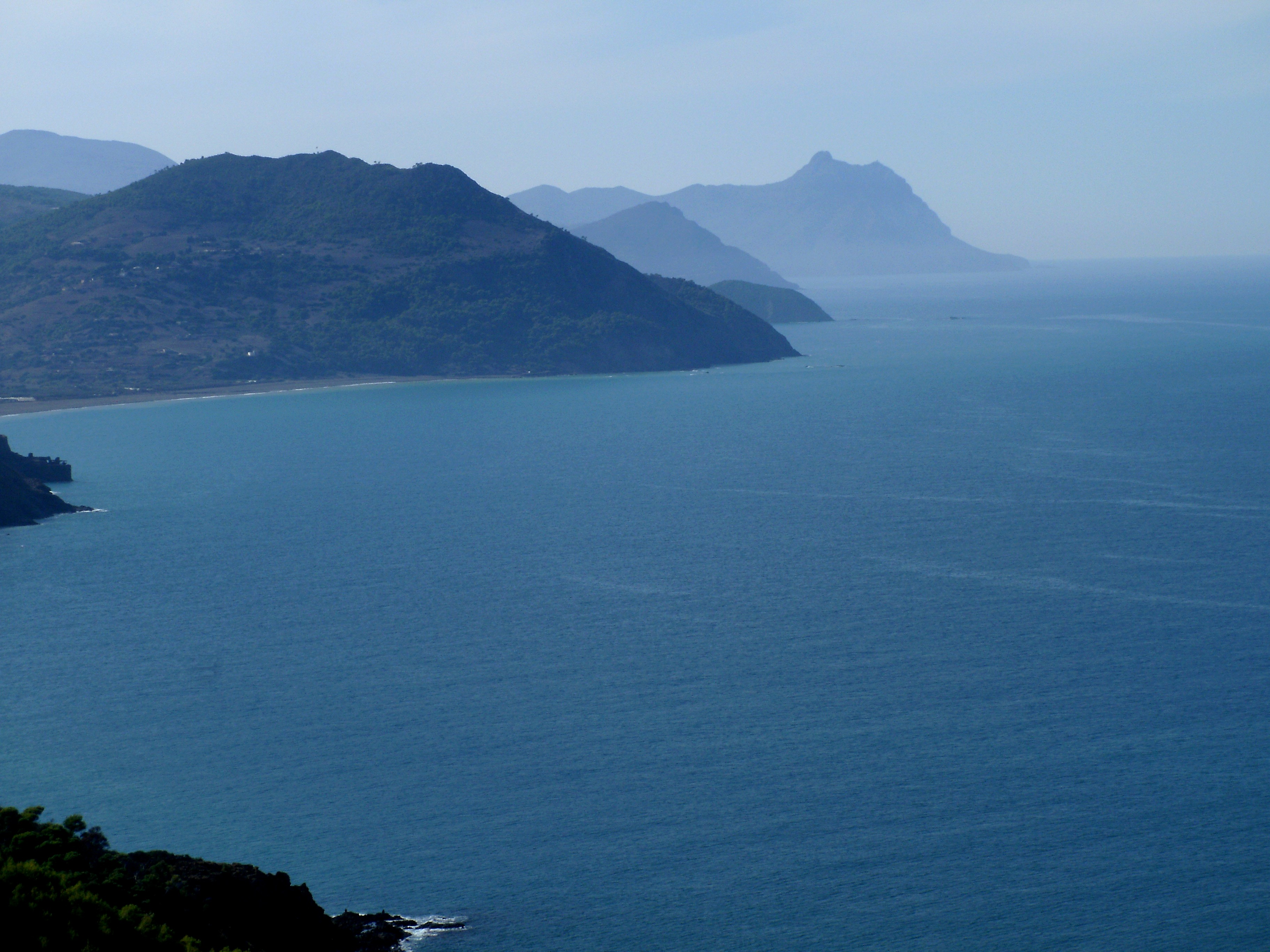
- View of the coastal Dahra Range in Cap Ténès

Highest point
- Peak: Mount Zaccar (Miliana)
- Elevation: 1,550 m (5,090 ft)
- Coordinates: 36°35′0″N 1°40′0″E

Geography
- Location within Algeria
- Location: Tipaza, Chlef, Aïn Defla, Mostaganem, Relizane, Médéa, Blida( َAlgeria )
- Parent range: Tell Atlas

The Dahra Range (Berber: ⴹⴰⵀⵔⴰ, Arabic: جبال الظهرة) is a mountain range located in northern Algeria. 'Dahra' is an Arabic word meaning 'back'; in toponymy, this term indicates a long plateau of lesser altitude. The region's populous partially speaks Berber and was formally named the Maghraoua Mountains. Most of the region consists of Mediterranean forest and cultivated fields.

== Geography ==
The Dahra is a low mountain chain part of the greater Tell Atlas, which stretches from Algiers in the east along the Mediterranean coast until reaching the mouth of the Chelif River near Mostaganem at its western end. It includes the provinces of Tipaza, Chlef, Ain Delfa, Mostaganem, Relizane, and Bilda. Its tallest summit is 1,550 metres high on Mount Zaccar, north of Miliana, a town built on its slopes. Other important mountain peaks are Mount Anneb (1,118 m), Mount Bissa, Mount El Gourine (786 m), and Mount Arbal (1,095 m).

Some massifs feature several caves. The coastal areas of the Dahra are called the "Corniches of Dahra," applying to the sections between Tenes and Mostaganem or Tenes and Cherchell, depending on the source. The inhabitants of the range are mainly Berber people, particularly the Chenoua people, descending from the Banou Ifren and the Maghraouas.

The range is covered with Mediterranean forest and partial scattered patches of cultivated lands. It shelters several cirques and small fishing ports.

== History ==
Under the Roman Empire, the region's thuya forests were exploited. During the Ottoman period, the city of Mazouna, also the region's cultural capital, became the capital of the Beylik of the West until 1701. It was in the city that the Sanusiyya clan was first founded.

At the beginning of the 18th century, the Dahra provided grain, livestock, honey, and wax. Soon after the French began to take control of the region in 1830, winegrowers on the coast exported portions of their products to Portugal, Livorno in Italy, and Marseille in France. Fodder supported the breeding of Barb horses and other herds of cattle, sheep, and goats. Local products and crafts encouraged intertribal and interregional trade. The Bani Madun and Bani Zarwal tribes are considered to be the two most powerful in the area.

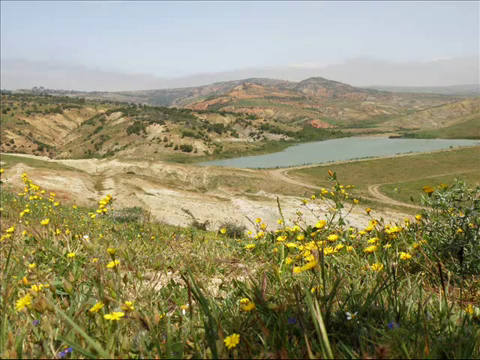
The lower Dahra Mountains of Mostaganem Province

The Dahra were incorporated into the Emirate of Abdelkader by Emir Abdelkader. Following the Treaty of Tafna in 1837, Tenes and Cherchell remained as the only ports available to the Emir, from which he could export wool and grain to Algiers or abroad. As the French conquest of Algeria continued on, the caves of the Dahra were the sites of the enfumades, a technique which suffocated thousands in caves using smoke. A local tribe allied with Cheikh Bouamama took refuge in the caves to flee from a French regiment led by Colonel Aimable Peissier. He would enlight fires around the cave's exits, asphyxiating nearly a thousand people. Napoleon Joseph Ney, a peer of France, described it as an "act of inexplicable cruelty."

In 1884, geographer and activist Élisée Reclus founded an anarchist colony in the Dahra. Since the Algerian War, the region has gone through a notable decline in population, with most of the population around the Chelif River moving to major ports such as Algiers and Oran.

== Population ==
The inhabitants of the Dahra Range are mainly from Berber origin, more specifically from the Zenata, and are descended from the Banu Ifren and the Maghraouas. Most Berbers speak a dialect called Chenoua, widespread within the eastern portions of the range. The cities of Tenes and Mostaganem have preserved Arabic dialects, but many Berber speakers are also Arabic speakers with a second language.
