= Shenwa language =

Zenati Berber language of Algeria

Shenwa
- Chenoua
- Haqbaylit̠
- Native to: Algeria
- Region: Mount Chenoua, Tipasa and Chlef districts
- Ethnicity: Chenouas
- Native speakers: 76,000 (2007)
- Language family: Afro-Asiatic: Berber; Northern; Zenati; Shenwa

Language codes
- ISO 639-3: cnu
- Glottolog: chen1266
- ELP: Chenoua

Shenwa, also spelt Chenoua (native name: Haqbaylit̠), is a Zenati Berber language spoken on Mount Chenoua (Jebel Chenoua) in Algeria, just west of Algiers, and in the provinces of Tipaza (including the town of Cherchell) and Chlef. The speech of Jebel Chenoua proper is mutually comprehensible with that of the nearby Beni Menacer and Beni Haoua, and they are thus treated as a single language. There are some 76,000 speakers.

== Phonology ==
Judging by Laoust (whose work on the language predates systematic phonology), Shenwa has the following sounds, which are given below in the International Phonetic Alphabet along with differing representations in the Algerian standard Latin orthography for Berber languages in angle brackets ⟨ ⟩:

=== Consonants ===
	Labial	Dental		Alveolar		Palato- alveolar	Velar	Uvular	Pharyngeal	Glottal
	Labial	plain	pharyn.	plain	pharyn.	Palato- alveolar	Velar	Uvular	Pharyngeal	Glottal
Stop	b	t d	tˤ ⟨ṭ⟩				k g	q		
Affricate				ts ⟨ţ⟩		tʃ ⟨č⟩ dʒ ⟨ğ⟩				
Fricative	f β ⟨ḇ⟩	θ ⟨ṯ⟩ ð ⟨ḏ⟩	ðˤ ⟨ḍ⟩	s z	sˤ ⟨ṣ⟩	ʃ ⟨c⟩ ʒ ⟨j⟩	x ⟨ḵ⟩	χ ⟨x⟩ ʁ ⟨γ⟩	ħ ⟨ḥ⟩ ʕ ⟨ε⟩	h
Nasal	m	n								
Approximant	w	l				j ⟨y⟩				
Trill		r								

Comparison with other Berber languages suggests that Laoust's transcription may have failed to distinguish certain sounds, notably pharyngealized /zˤ/.

=== Vowels ===
/a/, /i/, /u/, /ə/ ⟨e⟩. Laoust's ⟨o⟩ appears to variously indicate labialization (/ʷ/) or an allophone of /u/.

== Grammar ==
=== Nouns ===
Masculine nouns start with a-, i-, u- (in the singular) – like all Berber languages – or more rarely with a consonant (often corresponding to a- in other languages.) Examples: ayḏi "dog"; fus "hand"; iri "neck"; urṯu "garden". Their plural is usually in i-...-en (e.g. ameţin "death" → imeţinen), but a variety of other plural forms (e.g. i-...-an, i-...-wen, i-...awen, i-...-en, i-...-a-), sometimes accompanied by internal ablaut, are also found: e.g. ijiḏer "eagle" → ijuḏar, iṯri "star" → iṯran, afer "wing" → ifrawen, icer "fingernail" → icaren.

Feminine nouns start with h- (originally t-), and usually end with -t or -ṯ: hagmarṯ "mare", hesa "liver". A few feminine nouns have lost the h-: malla "turtledove". A masculine noun can be made diminutive by adding the feminine affixes: afus "hand" → hafust "little hand". The plurals of feminine nouns fall into much the same types as masculine ones, but adding h- at the beginning and using -in rather than -en: hakṯemţ "female" → hikṯemin, harract "girl" → harracin, huqiṯ "stone" → huqay, hawleliṯ "spider" → hiwlela.

Genitive constructions – English "X of Y" or "Y's X" – are formed as "X Y", in which the prefix of Y changes to u- (masc.) or n ţe- (fem.). Thus, for instance: aman n ţala "the water of the fountain", aglim uγilas "the skin of the panther". n "of" is also used with foreign words: hagmarṯ n elqayd̠ "the mare of the Caid".

=== Adjectives ===
Adjectives agree in number and gender with the noun, and are formed in the same way: e.g. amellal "white", azegrar "long", azaim "good". The particle d̠ is used before adjectives in certain contexts (including as a copula), in the same way as in the Kabyle language.

=== Numbers ===
As in Kabyle, only the first two numbers are Berber; for higher numbers, Arabic is used. They are iğ (f. ict) "one", sen (f. senat̠) "two". The noun being counted follows it in the genitive: senat̠ n ţuwura "two doors".

"First" and "last" are respectively amezgaru and aneggaru (regular adjectives). Other ordinals are formed with the prefix wis (f. his): wis sen "second (m.)", his t̠elat̠a "third (f.)", etc.

=== Pronouns ===
The basic personal pronouns of Shenwa are as follows. Gender is distinguished in all cases except the first person.

English	Standalone form	Possessive	Direct object	Indirect object	Object of preposition	Subject of preterite verb	Subject of aorist verb	Subject of imperative verb
I	neč, nečinţin	-inu	-i	-ay	-i	-egh	a-...-egh	
you (m. sg.)	cek, cekinţin	-nnek	-c, -ic, -icek	-ak	-ek	h-...-d̠	ah-...-d̠	-
you (f. sg.)	cem, cemminţin	-nnem	-cem, icem	-am	-em	h-...-d̠	ah-...-d̠	-
he	neţa, neţan	-nnes	-t̠, -it̠, -h	-as	-es	i-	ay-	
she	neţat̠	-ennes	-ţ, -iţ	-as	-es	h-	ah-	
we	necnin	-nnegh	-negh, -ghen	-anegh, -aghen	-negh	n-	ann-...(-t̠)	
you (m. pl.)	kennim	-nnwen	-kem, -ikem	-awen	-wen	h-...-m	ah-...-m	-t̠
you (f. pl.)	kennimţ	-nnwenţ	-kemţ, -ikemţ	-awenţ	-wenţ	h-...-mţ	ah-...-mţ	-mţ
they (m.)	nahnin	-nsen	-t̠en, -it̠en, -hen, -ihen	-asen	-sen	-n	a-...-n	
they (f.)	nahninţ	-nsenţ	-t̠enţ, -it̠enţ, -henţ, -ihenţ	-asenţ	-senţ	-nţ	a-...-nţ	

The basic demonstrative adjectives are -a "this" (also -ay, -ad̠; -ax for middle distance), -in "that", -enni "the aforementioned". The demonstrative pronouns include:

- "this": wa m. sg., hax f. sg., yid̠a m. pl., hid̠a f. pl.
- "this" (emphatic): wayek, hayek, id̠ad̠ik, hid̠ad̠ik
- "this" (in question): wenni, henni, id̠enni, hid̠enni
- "that": win, hin, yid̠in, hid̠in

The standalone possessive pronouns ("mine", "yours", etc.) are formed by suffixing the possessive pronouns to "this" (except that ha- is used instead of hax.) Similarly, the adjective "other" (invariable enniḍen) combines with "this" to make forms meaning "the other": unniḍen, henniḍen, id̠enniḍen, hid̠enniḍin.

The main interrogative pronouns are: maţa "what?", manţ "which", manay "who?", mi lan "whose?", miked̠ "with whom?", mid̠eg "in what?", mizeg "with what?", mifeg "on what?", miγer "at/for whom?"

The relative pronoun is i "which".

Indefinite pronouns include yeğ (f. yectenţ) "one, someone", cra "something". Negative forms are made using the Arabic loanword haţa (حتى); haţa d̠ yeğ "no one", haţa d̠ elḥabb "nothing".

=== Verbs ===
The declarative mood is divided into two tenses: preterite (past) and aorist (non-past, formed by the addition of a-.) There is also an imperative mood. The irregular imperative ia "come" is used with the aorist to form imperatives of the first person: iaw annaroḥet̠ "let's go". The pronoun affixes for these are given under Pronouns. The declarative mood is also accompanied by ablaut:

- Verbs whose imperative consists of two consonants or less (e.g. eğ "eat", eγr "read", ezr "see", enγ "kill") add -a to the stem in the 3rd person singulars and 1st person plural, and -i in all other forms: enγiγ "I killed", henγa "she killed".
- Verbs whose imperative begins with a- (e.g. adef "come in", ad̠er "go down", azen "send") change it to u-: thus ud̠efen "they came in", hud̠efed "you (sg.) came in. (Verbs such as af "find" belong to both this and the previous group.) awi "bring" and awd̠ "arrive" are exceptions, changing a- to i-: yiwi "he brought".
- Verbs with -a- in the middle (e.g. laz "be hungry", nam "have the habit of", ğal "judge") change it to -u-: elluzeγ "I was hungry".
- Verbs with a final vowel usually behave like the two-consonant ones: arji "dream" → ourjiγ "I dreamt", yurja "he dreamt"; egmi "teach" → egmiγ "I taught", igma "he taught". But there are exceptions: erni "be born" → irni "he was born".

The participle is formed by adding -n to the 3rd person m. sg., sometimes with ablaut of final vowels: inziz "he sang" → inzizen; ayenziz "he will sing" → ayenzizen, yut̠a "he hit" → yut̠in.

The verb is negated by adding u... c around it: u ţinziz ec "don't sing", u huwired̠ ec "you didn't walk". "Not yet" is u rt̠uci εad̠ or ur uci, where rt̠uci and uci are verbs conjugated in the appropriate person: u rt̠uciγ εad̠ u d yuḍeγ ec "I haven't arrived yet", u hert̠ucid̠ εad̠ ... "you haven't yet..."

Derived verb forms include:

- a causative in s-: azeg "boil" → sizeg "make something boil".
- a "reciprocal" middle voice in m-: zer "see" → mzer "be seen"
- a passive voice in ţwa-: abba "carry" → ţwabba "be carried".
- Various habitual forms.

Continuous forms can be formed with aql- "see X" in the present tense, ţuγa "was" in the past tense: aqlay ţeţeγ "I am eating", ţuγay ţeţeγ"I was eating".

=== Prepositions ===
Prepositions precede their objects: i medden "to the people", sgi Bazar "from Tipaza". Some of the main ones are: i "to" (dative), n "of", d̠eg/d̠i/eg/i "in(to)", seg/zeg-/si "from", s "using" (instrumental), f/fell- "on", γer/γ "towards", akid̠/d̠, "with", jar "among", zat̠ "in front of", awr "behind", i sawen/susawen "under", addu "over".

=== Conjunctions ===
Conjunctions precede the verb: ami yiwoḍ "when he arrived", qabel ma ţaγen "see if it's raining". Some important ones include: melmi "when?", ami, γassa(l), assγa, γir "when", ma, kagella, lukan, willa "if", (an)neγ "or".

== Sample text ==
Qaren midden: Unni ayḥağen d̠ug ass, adeffeγen arraw ennes d̠iferd̠asen.

They say: he that tells stories in the daytime, his children will turn bald.

Ţḥağen γir d̠eg iḍ

They only tell stories at night.

=== Uccen aked̠ waḥzaw/The jackal and the child ===
Iğ wuccen iroḥ iggur lami g ufa iğ waḥzaw iţellem i hezra. Innas uccen i warrac enni: "Maţa hellid̠ hegared̠." Arrac enni innas: "Ţellemeγ d̠i hezra." Innas uccen: "Ad̠el ay hirkasin." Arrac enni iţxiyeḍ as iḍaren nes. Lami iqaḍa innas: "Roḥ, aεd̠el iḍaren ennek̠ γer fwit̠."

Iroḥ uccen yaεd̠el iman es γer fwit̠ lami eqqoren iḍaren u iğim ec ayuwr.

Ikk ed sin iğ wumcic; innas uccen: "Sellek ay u c eţţγec." Iks as umcic hazra seg ḍarennes. Iroḥ uccen iwalla γer waḥzaw ič as elkul iγeṭṭen.

A jackal went and met a child plaiting a rope. The jackal asked the child: "What are you doing?" This child replied: "I'm plaiting a rope." The jackal said: "Make me some shoes." This child tied up his feet. When he was done he told him: "Go show your feet in the sun."

The jackal went and showed his own feet in the sun, and his feet dried and he couldn't walk.

A cat arrived and the jackal told it: "Help me, I won't eat you." The cat took the rope off his feet. The jackal went back to the child, and ate all his goats.

== Bibliography ==
- E. Laoust, Etude sur le dialecte berbère du Chenoua, Algiers 1912.
