= Bologhine Forest =

Forest in Bologhine County, Algeria

- Location within Algeria
- Interactive map of Bologhine Forest

Geography
- Location: Algiers Province, Bologhine, Algeria
- Coordinates: 36°48′16″N 3°01′40″E
- Area: 324 ha (800 acres)

Bologhine Forest is a forest located in Bologhine, Algiers. It is managed by the Forest Conservation Authority of Algiers, which operates under the supervision of the Directorate General of Forests (DGF).

== Overview ==
The forest is subject to the provisions set forth in Decree 84-45 of February 18, 1984, as amended and supplemented by Decree 07-231 of July 30, 2007. The reduction in the area of the forest has been attributed to urbanization, rapid urban development, and the formation of slums, with an estimated 40% of the initial area having been removed.

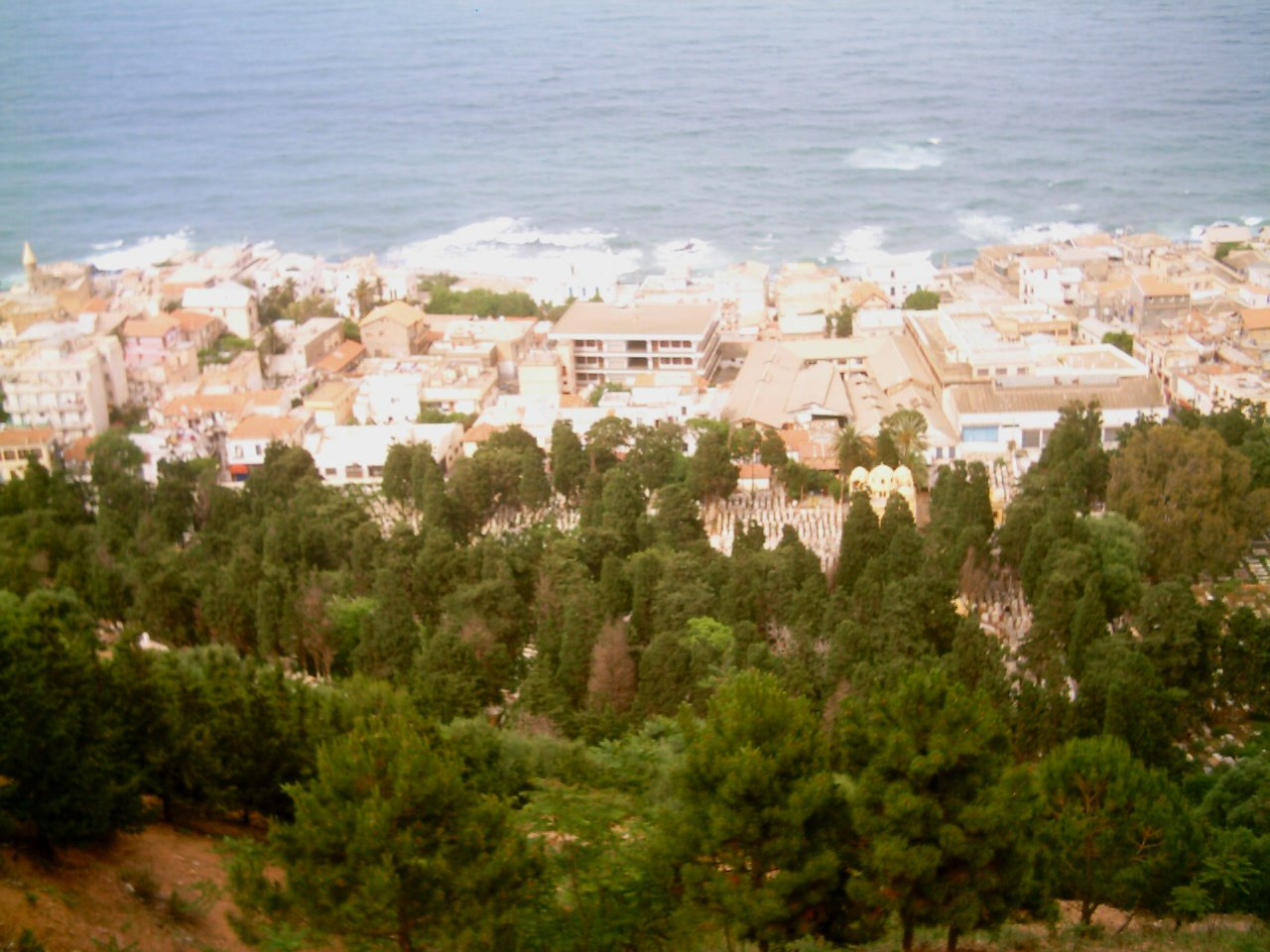
A view of the Mediterranean Sea from Bologhine Forest.

== Premises ==
=== Mosques ===
The forest is situated in close proximity to a number of mosques, including:

- Umma Mosque to the northwest.
- Al-Falah Mosque to the northeast.
- Al-Dawa Mosque to the east.
- Khaled bin Al-Walid Mosque to the west.
- Ali bin Abi Talib Mosque to the west.
- Al-Ihsan Mosque to the west.

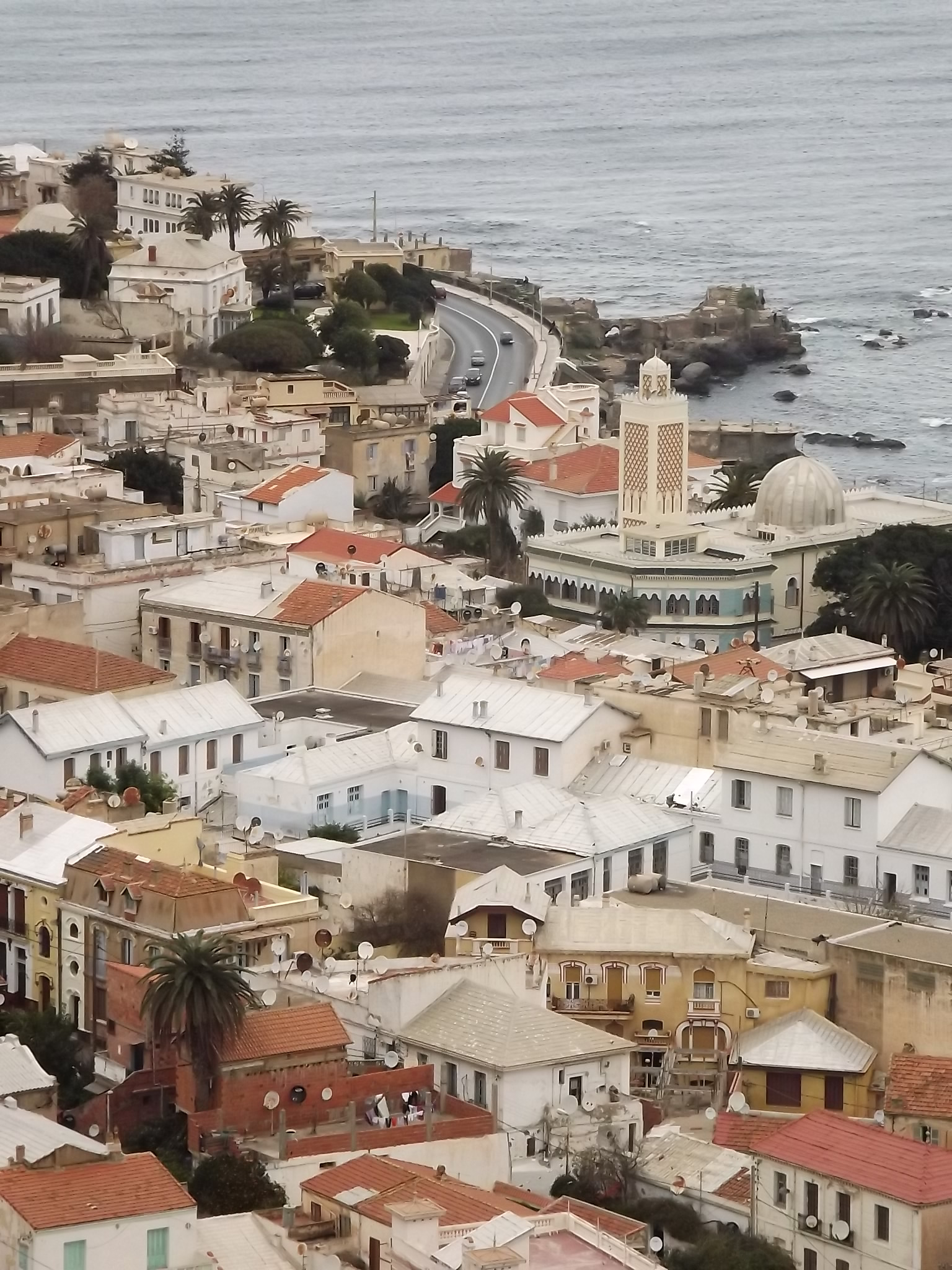
Umma Mosque in Bologhine.

=== Omar Hamadi Stadium ===
The northeastern wing of the forest is situated in close proximity to the Omar Hamadi football stadium, which was inaugurated in 1924 and serves as the home ground for Mouloudia Algiers. To the north, the stadium is bordered by the Mediterranean Sea.

=== Notre-Dame d'Afrique ===
One of the notable landmarks in the area is the Notre-Dame d'Afrique, situated on a promontory with a view of the sea. The building is accessible via the Algiers City Teleferic.

=== St. Eugene's Cemetery ===
St. Eugene Cemetery is a Christian and Jewish burial ground situated on the northern periphery of the forest, encompassing an area of 14.5 hectares (36 acres) and extending to the Notre-Dame d'Afrique, which is overseen by a staff of twenty.

== Location ==
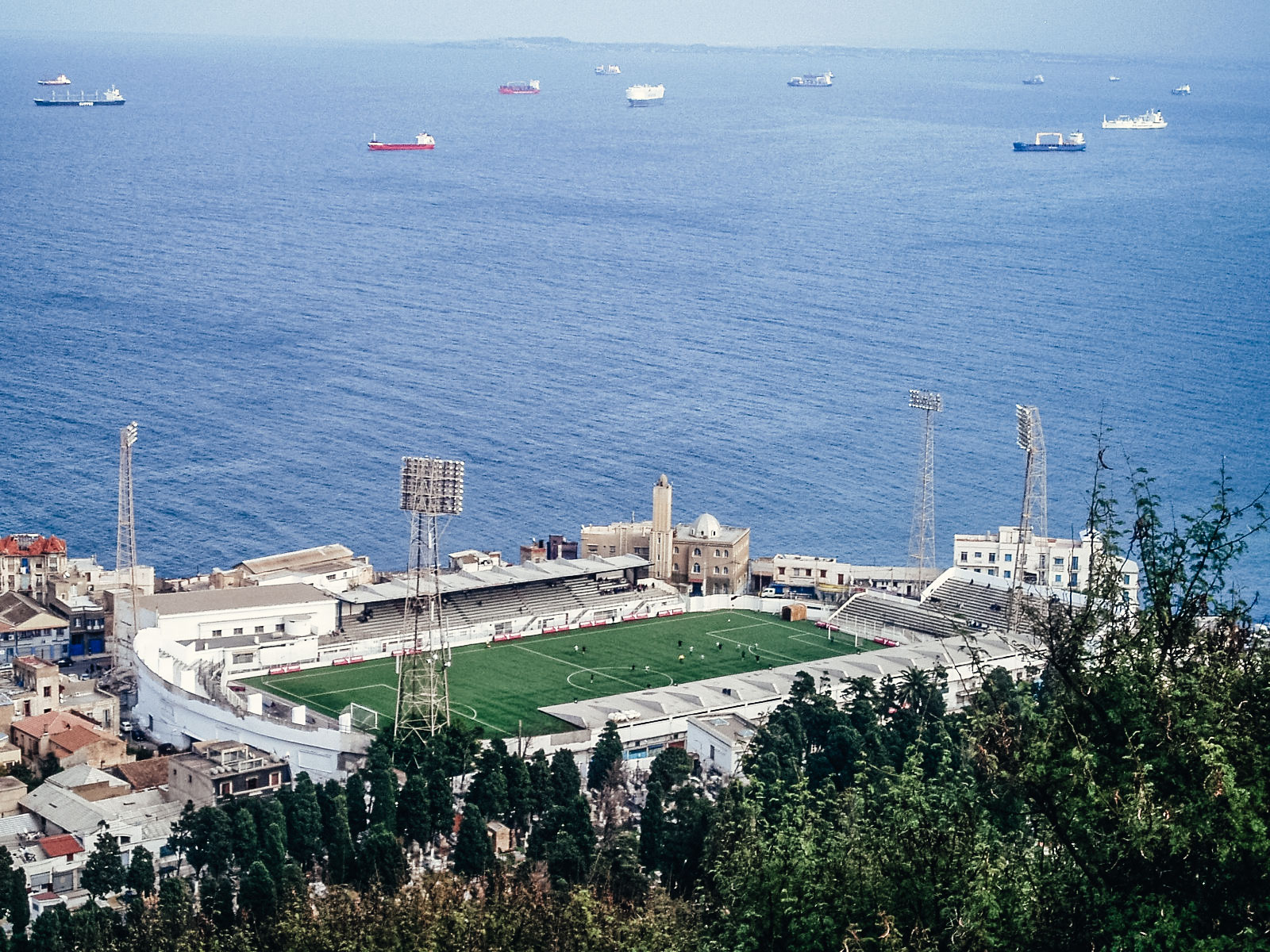
Omar Hamadi Stadium in Bologhine.

Bologhine Forest is situated at a distance of 12 km to the west of the Algerian capital, Algiers, 62 km to the east of Tipaza, and 3 km from the Mediterranean Sea. It is located within the municipality of Bologhine in Mitidja.

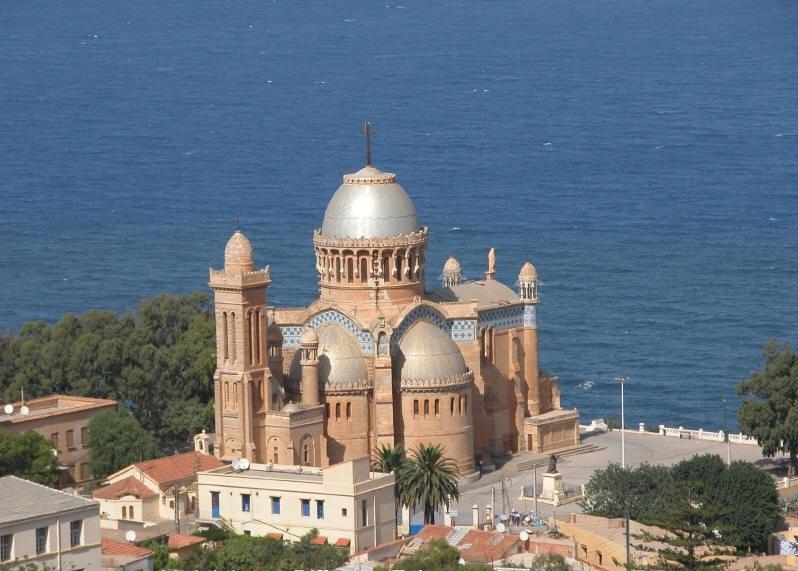
Notre-Dame d'Afrique in Bologhine.

== See also ==
- Zeralda Forest
- El-Mouradia Forest
- Réghaïa forest
- Bachdjerrah forest
