= Ben Aknoun Forest =

Forest in Algiers Province, Algeria

- Location within Algiers
- Interactive map of Ben Aknoun Forest

Geography
- Location: Algeria, Algiers Province, Ben Aknoun
- Coordinates: 36°45′29″N 2°59′59″E
- Area: 3.04 km^{2} (1.17 sq mi)

Ben Aknoun Forest is a forest situated in Ben Aknoun, within the Algiers province of Algeria. The forest is managed by the Forest Conservation Authority of Algiers and operates under the supervision of the General Directorate of Forests.

== Location ==
Ben Aknoun Forest is located 20 kilometers southwest of Algiers, within the municipality of Ben Aknoun in the Mitidja region. Covering an area of 304 hectares (750 acres). Adjacent to the forest is Ben Aknoun Park, which includes both a zoo and an amusement park. Opened in 1982 in the Said Hamdeen area, the park attracts families, sports enthusiasts.
