= Mahelma Forest =

Forest in Mahelma, Algiers Province, Algeria

- Interactive map of Mahelma Forest

Geography
- Location: Mahelma, Algeria
- Coordinates: 36°39′07″N 2°53′32″E
- Elevation: 3 km (1.9 mi)
- Area: 9.5 ha (23 acres)

Mahelma Forest, also known as Oulad Monedel Forest, is a forest located in Mahelma, within the Mitja region of Algiers Province. It is managed by the Directorate of Forests of Algiers (CFA), under the supervision of the Directorate General of Forests (DGF). The forest is situated in a rocky area to the southeast of the city of Mahelma. As a consequence of urbanization, the forest has diminished in size to 9.5 hectares (23 acres).

== Afforestation ==
The implementation of the national reforestation plan has resulted in a net benefit to the forest. In 2013, the committee planted 1,000 trees as part of the environmental development program and the reconstruction of forest areas destroyed by external factors. The planting was conducted under the supervision of the Directorate of Forestry and Green Belt.

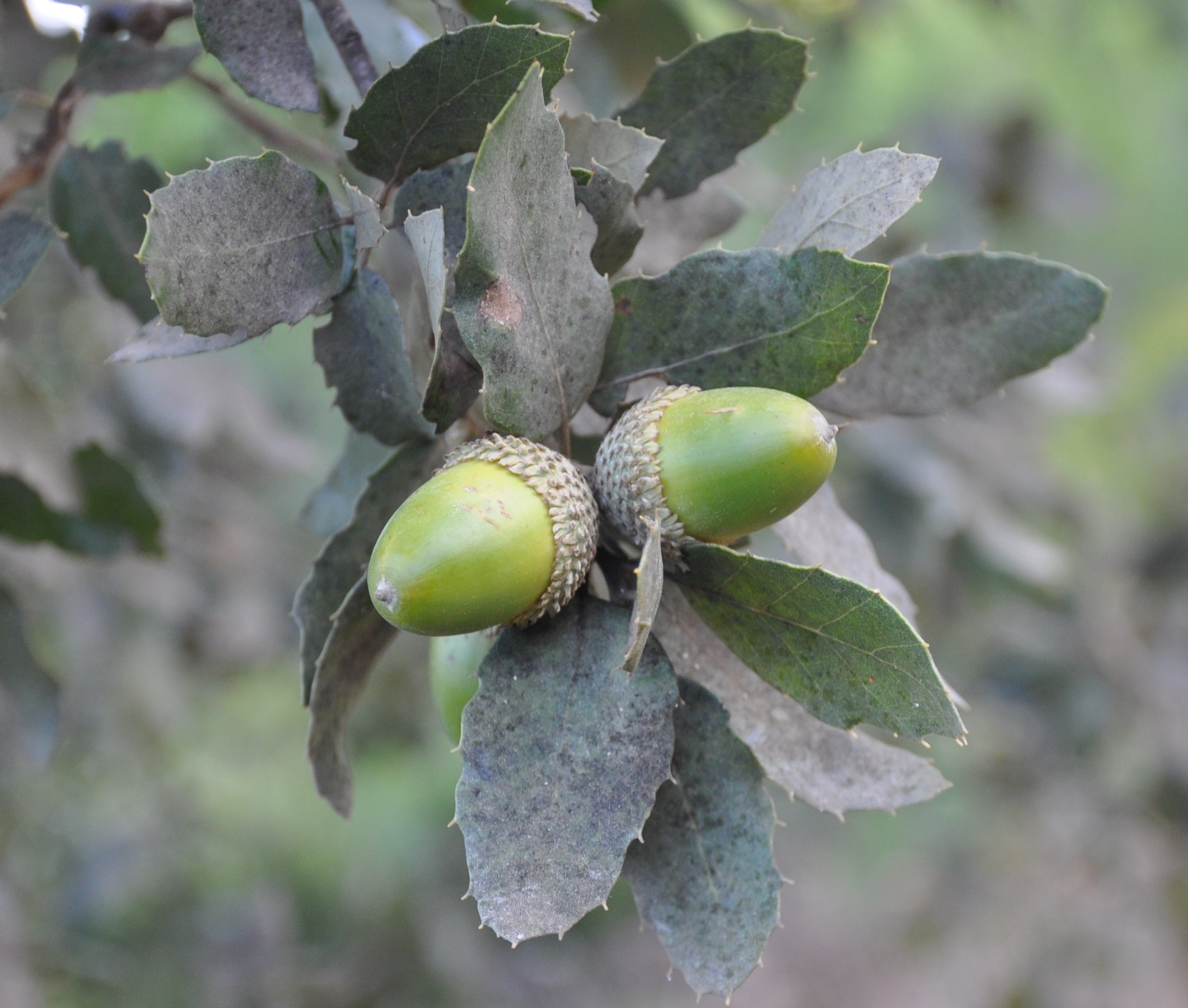
Quercus suber fruits.

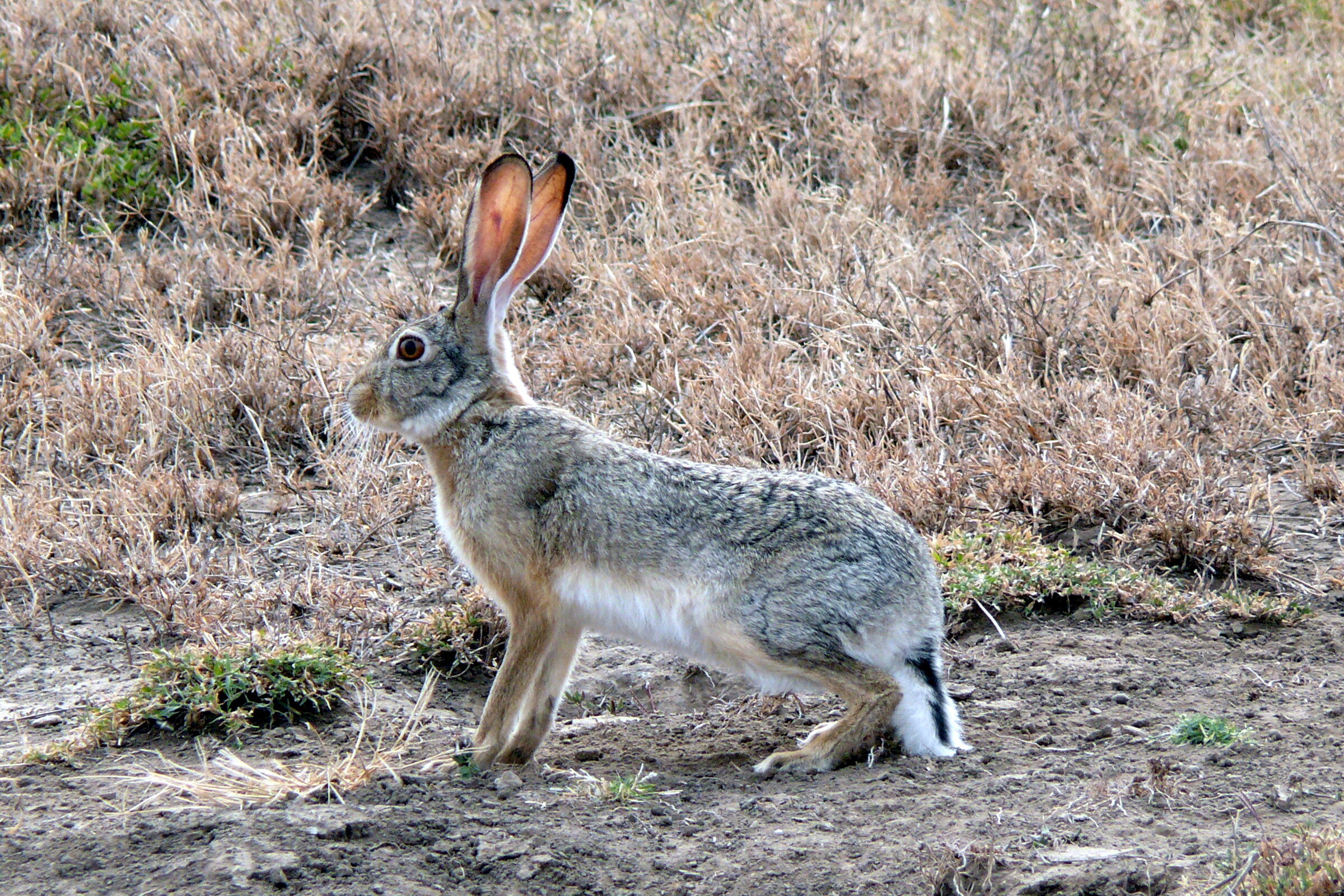
Cape hare

The 1,000 shrubs planted on a 9-hectare (22-acre) area are part of a watershed treatment program in Algeria's valleys. The program focused on the selection of tree species for planting, with the objective of replacing the dominant species, namely Aleppo pine, cypress, and cork oak.

== Wildlife ==
The region's fauna is distinguished by its remarkable biodiversity, particularly in the avian and entomological realms.

=== Mammals ===
- North African hedgehog.
- European rabbit.
- Wild boar.

== Location ==
The forest is situated at an approximate distance of 18 km east of Algiers, 70 km east of Tipaza, and 4 km from the Mediterranean Sea. It is situated within the municipality of Mahelma, Algiers.

== See also ==
- El-Mouradia Forest
- Bachdjerrah Forest
