= Tipasa =

Tipasa Tipaza
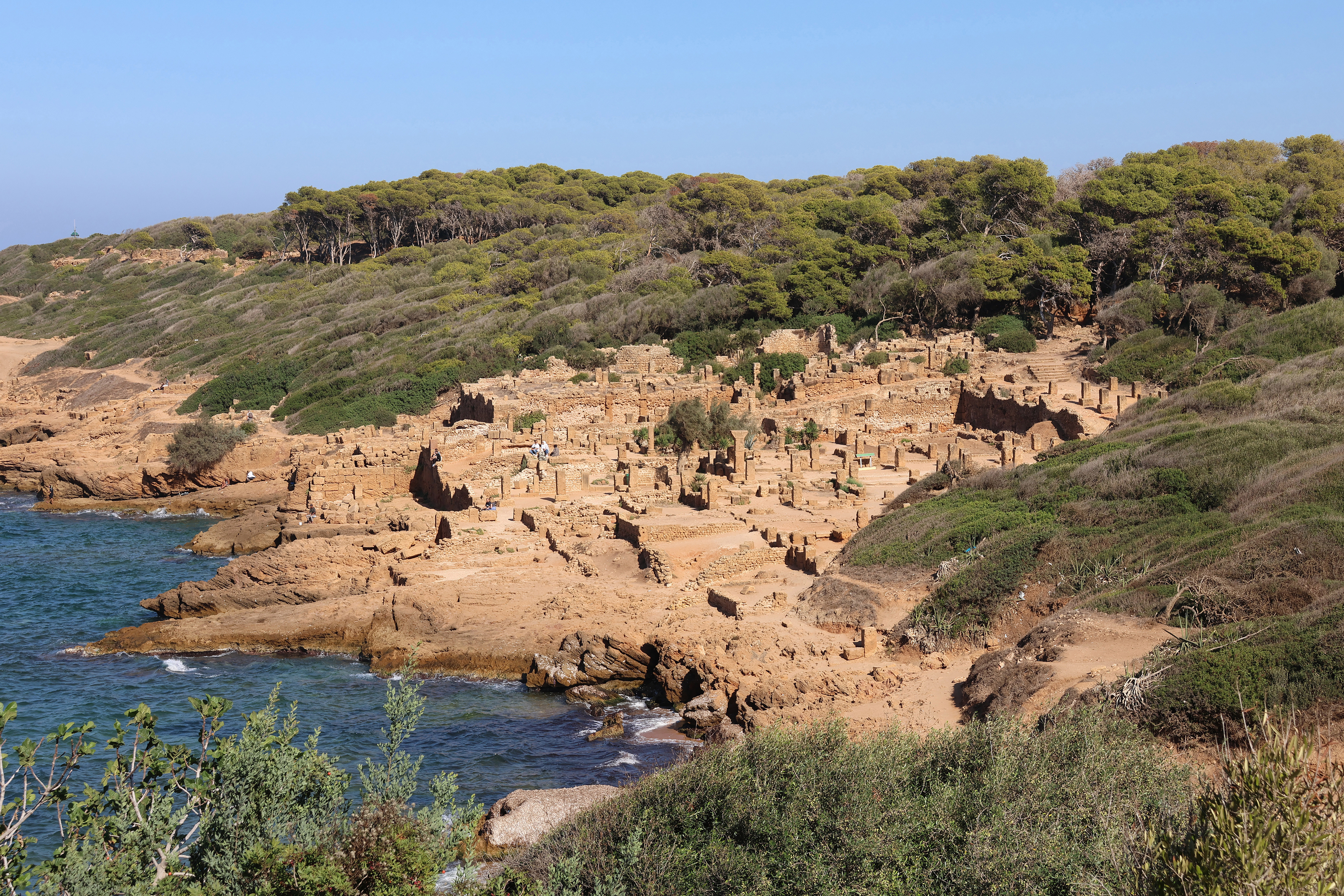

- Location in Algeria
- Coordinates: 36°35′31″N 2°26′58″E

UNESCO World Heritage Site
- Official name: Tipasa
- Type: Cultural
- Criteria: iii, iv
- Designated: 1982 (6th session)
- Reference no.: 193
- Region: Arab States
- Endangered: 2002–2006

Tipasa, sometimes distinguished as Tipasa in Mauretania, was a colonia in the Roman province Mauretania Caesariensis, nowadays called Tipaza, and located in coastal central Algeria. Since 1982, it has been declared by UNESCO a World Heritage Site. It was declared a World Heritage Site in danger in 2002, but was removed from the danger list in 2006 following conservation efforts.

== History ==
=== Punic trading post ===
Initially the city was a small ancient Punic trading-post.

=== Roman colony ===
Conquered by Ancient Rome, it was turned into a military colony by the emperor Claudius for the conquest of the kingdoms of Mauretania. Afterwards it became a municipium called Colonia Aelia Augusta Tipasensium.

The Roman city was built on three small hills which overlooked the sea, nearly 20 km. east from Caesarea (capital of Mauretania Caesariensis). Under Roman rule the city acquired greater commercial and military importance because of its harbour and its central position on the system of Roman coastal roads in North Africa. A wall of approximately 7,500 feet (2,300 metres) was built around the city for defense against nomadic tribes, and Roman public buildings and districts of houses were constructed within the enclosure.

Commercially Tipasa was of considerable importance, but it was not distinguished in art or learning.

=== Christian Tipasa ===
Christianity was introduced to Tipasa early, with the first Christian inscription there (and the oldest Christian epitaph in Roman Africa) dating to October 17, 237 AD, or 238. The city became an important Christian centre in the 3rd century., becoming an episcopal see, now inscribed in the Catholic Church's list of titular sees. It saw the construction of numerous Christian religious buildings in the later third and fourth centuries, including three churches — the Great Basilica and the Basilica Alexander on the western hill, and the Basilica of St Salsa on the eastern hill, the biggest basilicas within the modern limits of Algeria.

Most of the inhabitants, however, continued to be non-Christian until, according to legend, Salsa, a Christian maiden, threw the head of their serpent idol into the sea, whereupon the enraged populace stoned her to death. The body, miraculously recovered from the sea, was buried, on the hill above the harbour, in a small chapel which gave place subsequently to the stately basilica. Salsa's martyrdom took place in the fourth century. According to the historian Gsell, Tipasa reached a population of 20,000 inhabitants around that time. Christianity now became general among the Romanised Berbers and Roman colonists of Tipasa.

=== Decline ===
About 372 Tipasa withstood an assault by Firmus, the leader of a Berber rebellion that had overrun the nearby cities of Caesarea (modern Cherchell) and Icosium (modern Algiers). Tipasa then served as the base for the Roman counter-campaign. However, its fortifications did not prevent the city from being conquered by the Vandals about 429, bringing to an end the prosperity that the city had enjoyed during the Roman period. The conquerors partially destroyed the city in 430.

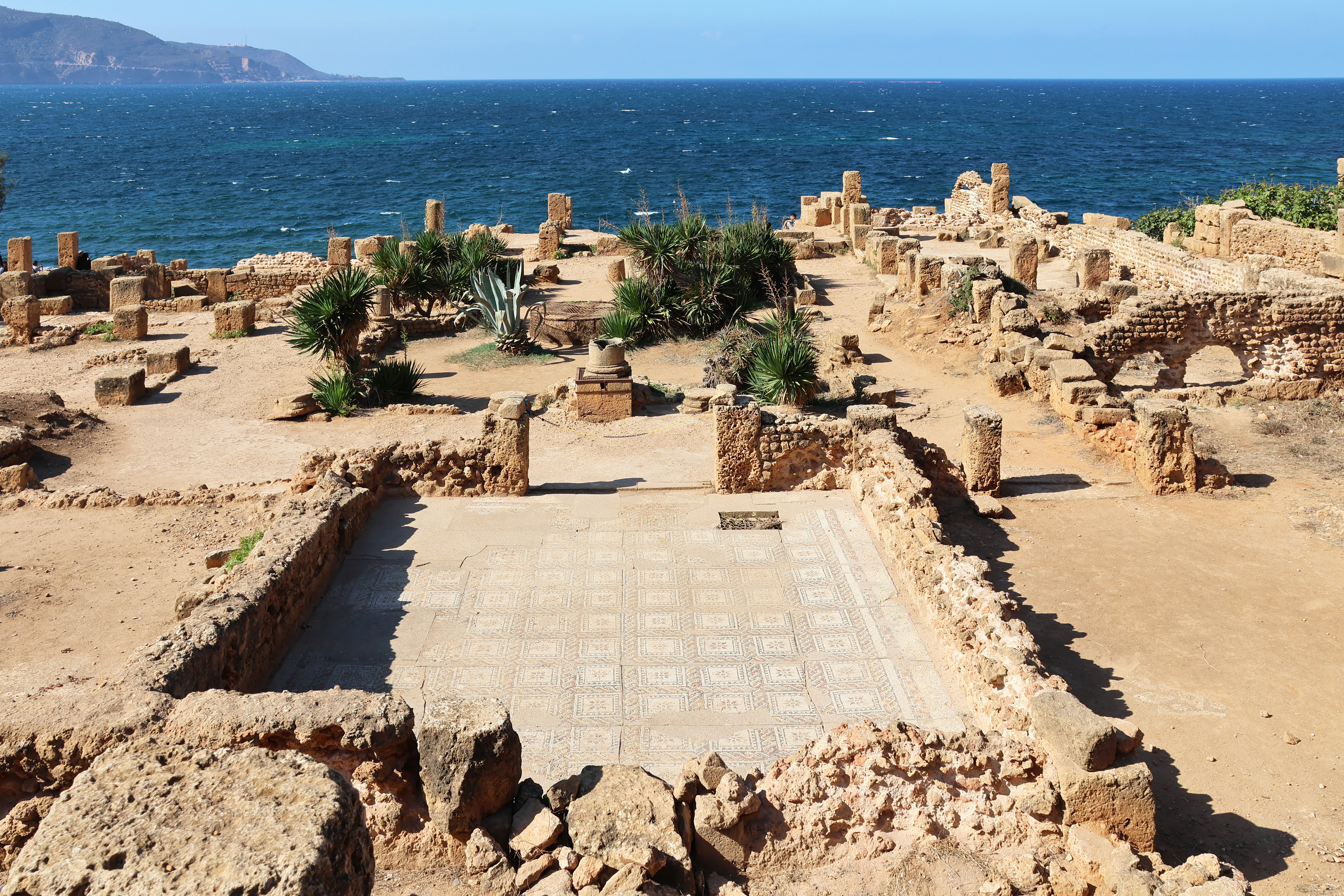
Villa of Frescoes

In 484, during the persecution of the Catholic church by the Vandal king Huneric (477‑484), the Catholic bishop of Tipasa was expelled and replaced with an Arian bishop, whereupon many of the inhabitants of the city fled to Spain. Many of the remainder were cruelly persecuted. In the ensuing decades the city fell into ruin. About 530, Tipasa was rebuilt by the Byzantines, and during their occupation in the 6th century revived for a brief time.

At the end of the seventh century the city was destroyed by the Arabs and reduced to ruins. The newcomers gave it the name Tefassed, which translated from the Arabic language means badly damaged.

=== Modern city ===
In 1857, the area was settled again with the creation of the city of Tipaza that now has nearly 30,000 inhabitants. The town and its surroundings is home to the largest Berber-speaking group of western Algeria, the Chenoua people.

The ruins of the old city also remain. Of the houses, most of which stood on the central hill, no traces remain; but there are ruins of the Great Basilica and the Basilica Alexander on the western hill, the Basilica of St Salsa on the eastern hill, two cemeteries, the baths, theatre, amphitheatre and nymphaeum. The line of the ramparts can be distinctly traced and at the foot of the eastern hill the remains of the ancient harbour.

The basilicas are surrounded by cemeteries, which are full of coffins, all of stone and covered with mosaics. The basilica of St. Salsa, which has been excavated by Stéphane Gsell, consists of a nave and two aisles, and still contains a mosaic. The Great Basilica served for centuries as a quarry, but it is still possible to make out the plan of the building, which was divided into seven aisles. Under the foundations of the church are tombs hewn out of the solid rock. Of these one is circular, with a diameter of 18 m and space for 24 coffins.

=== Tribute to Albert Camus ===
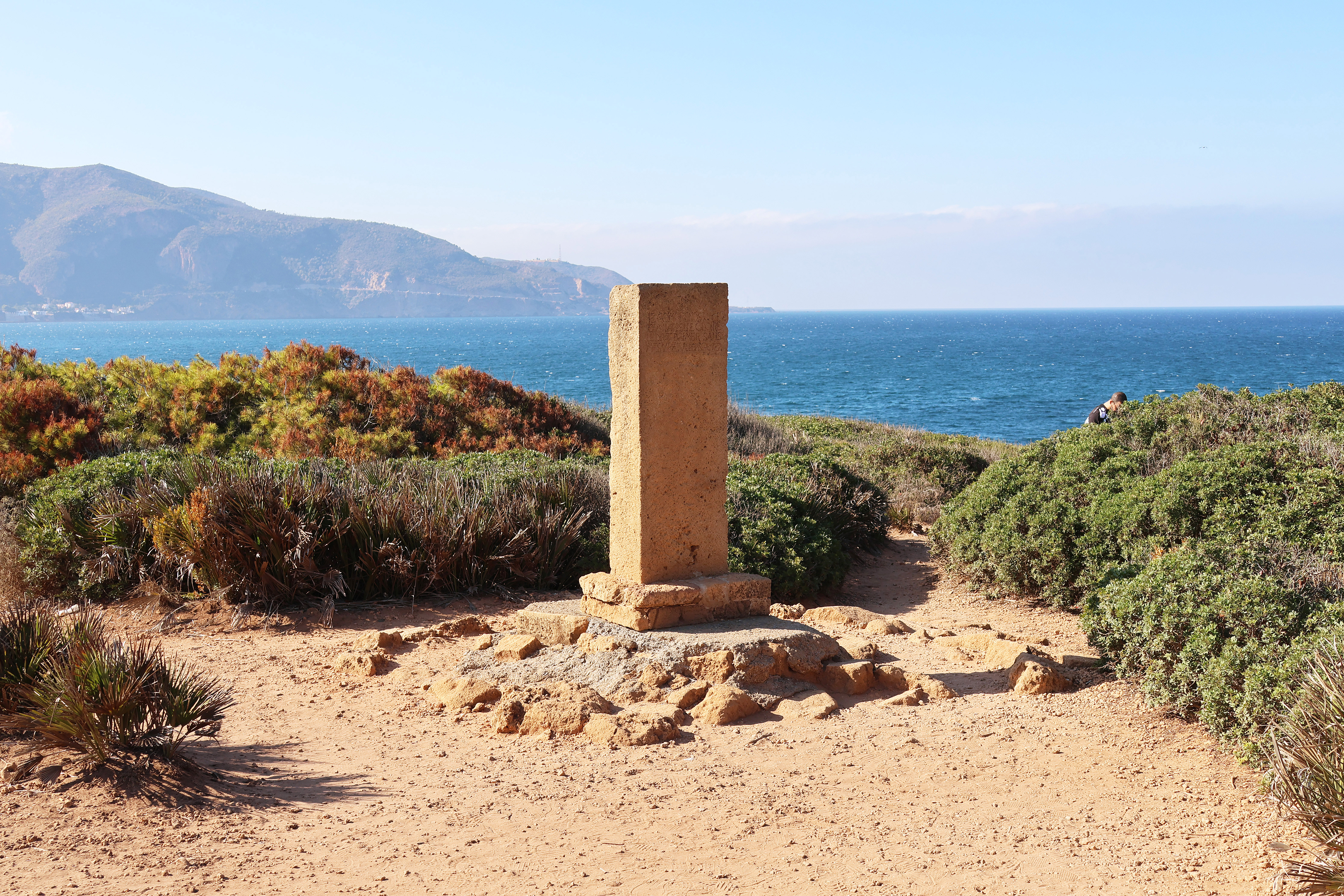
Stele to Albert Camus

Inside the Roman ruins, facing the sea and Mount Chenoua, a stele was erected in 1961 in honor of Albert Camus with this phrase in French, extracted from his work Noces à Tipasa: “I understand here what is called glory: the right to love beyond measure " (« Je comprends ici ce qu'on appelle gloire : le droit d'aimer sans mesure. »).

== Climate change ==
As a coastal heritage site, Tipasa is vulnerable to sea level rise. In 2022, the IPCC Sixth Assessment Report included it in the list of African cultural sites which would be threatened by flooding and coastal erosion by the end of the century.

== Gallery ==
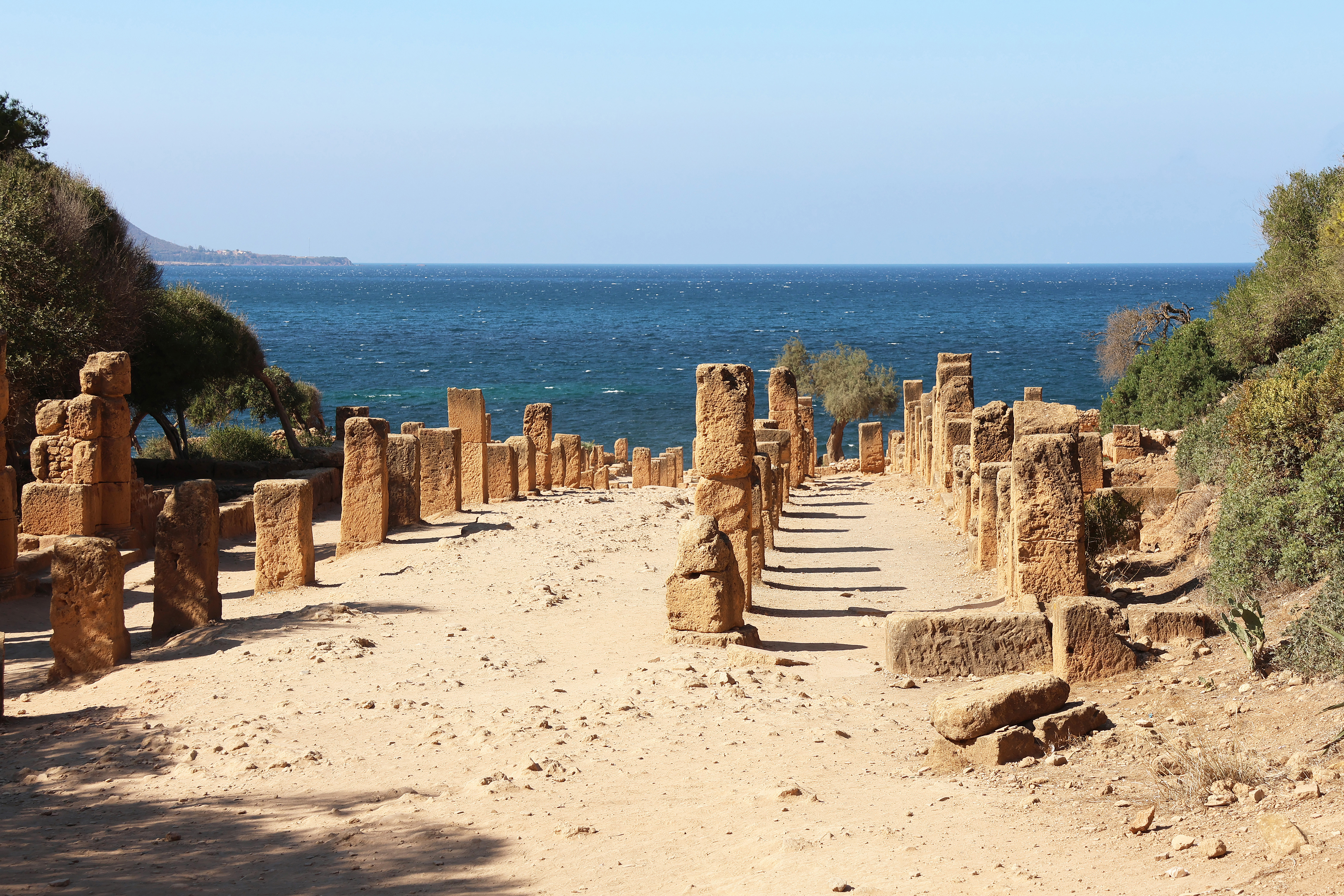
Cardo Maximus

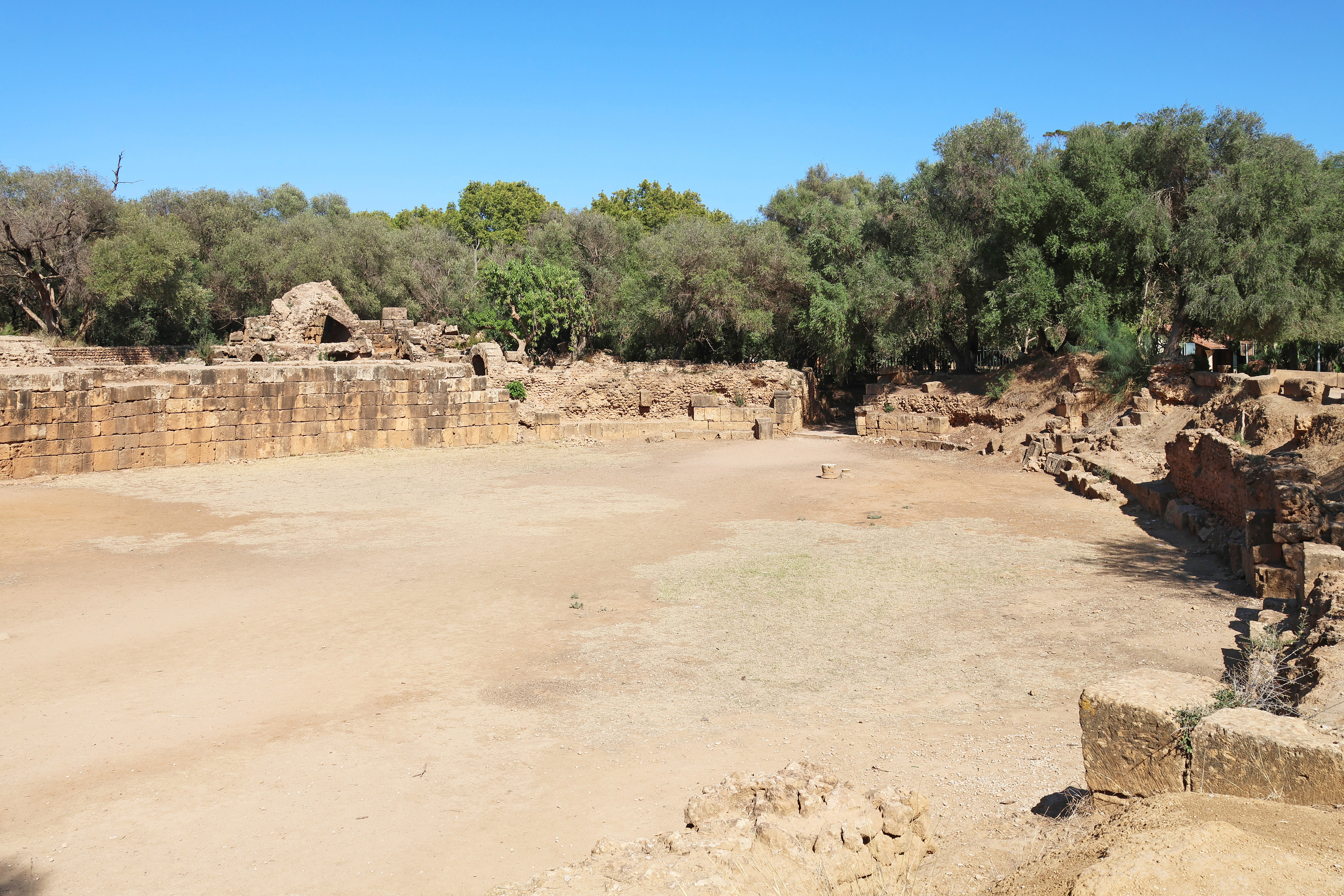
Amphitheatre

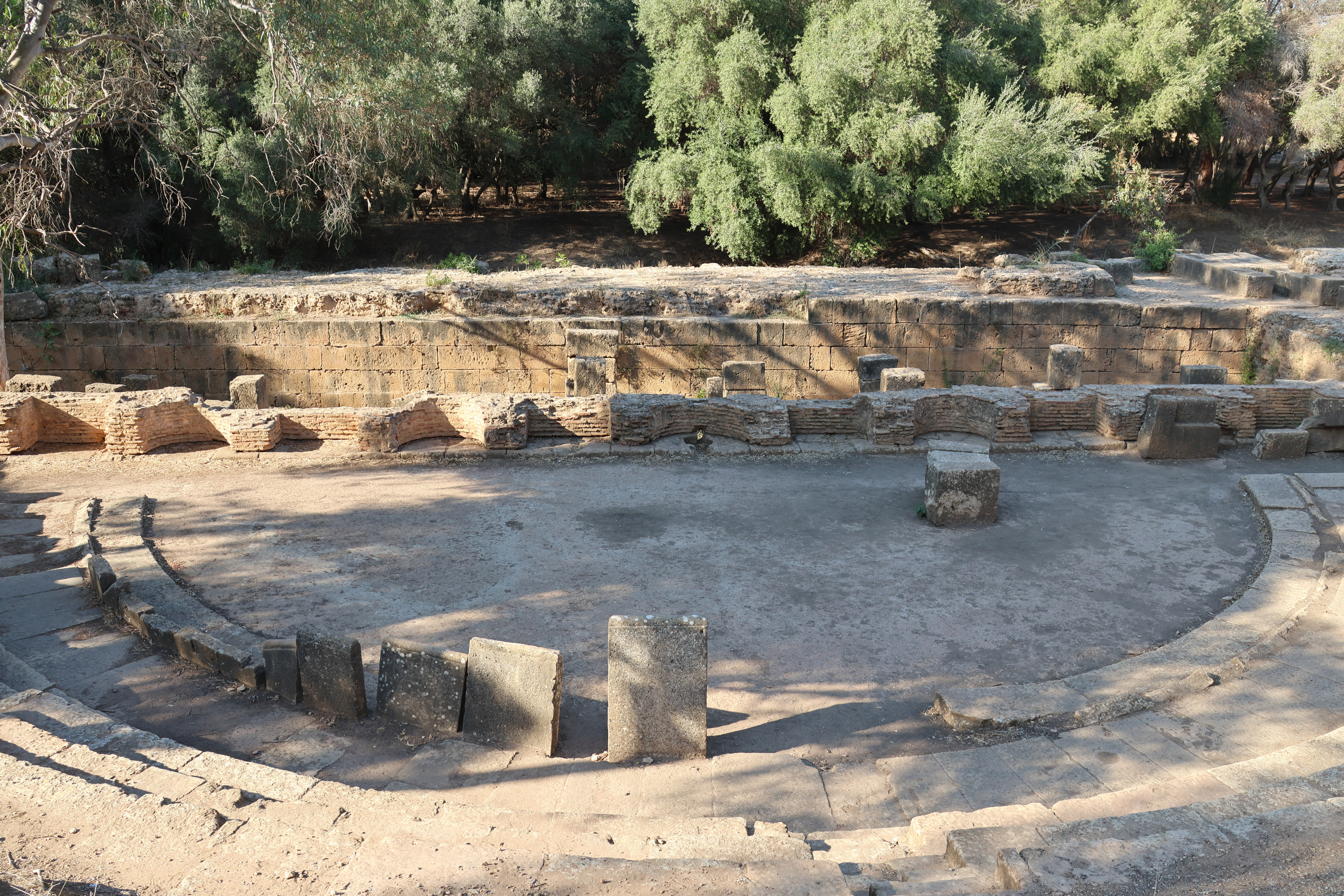
Theatre

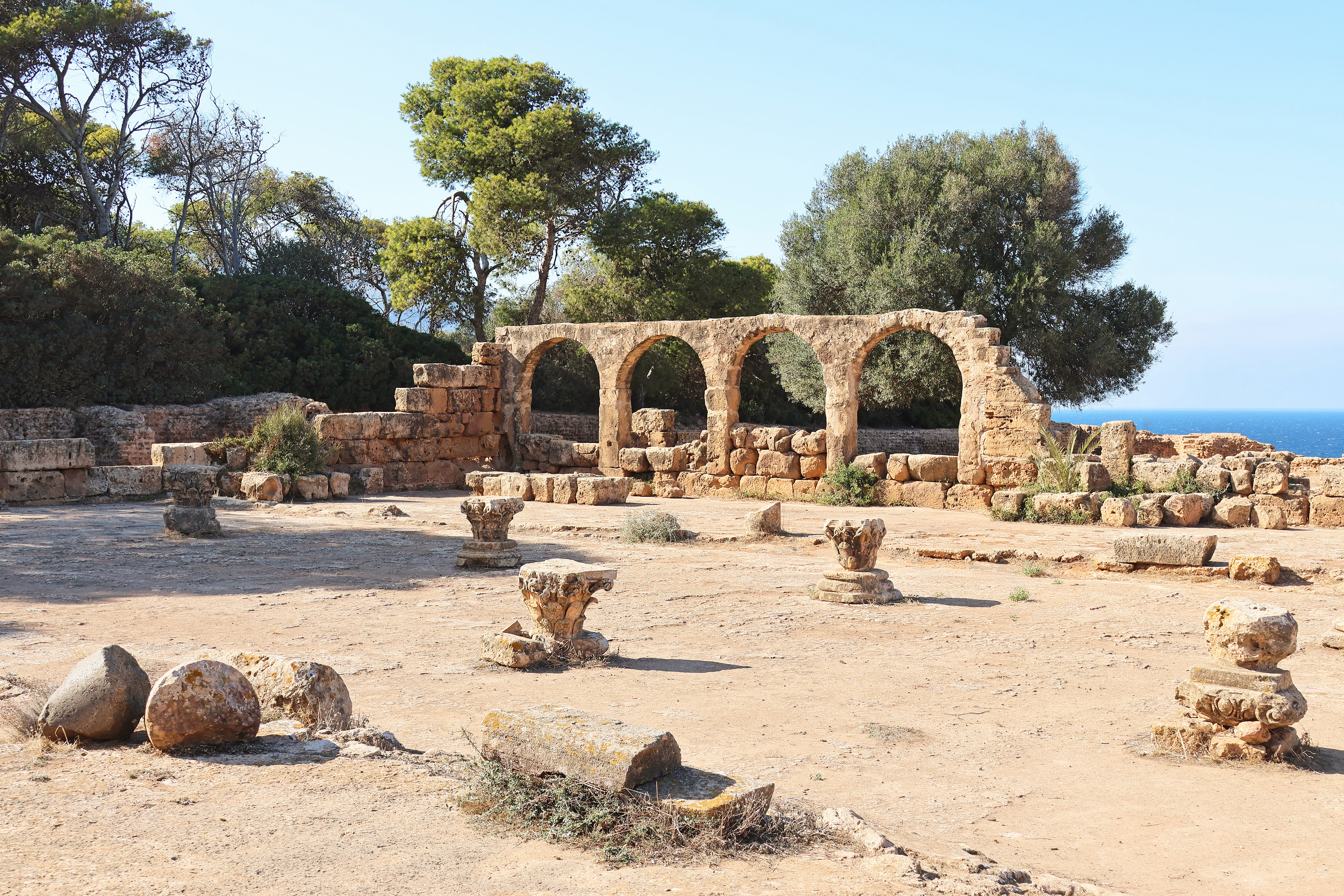
Christian basilica

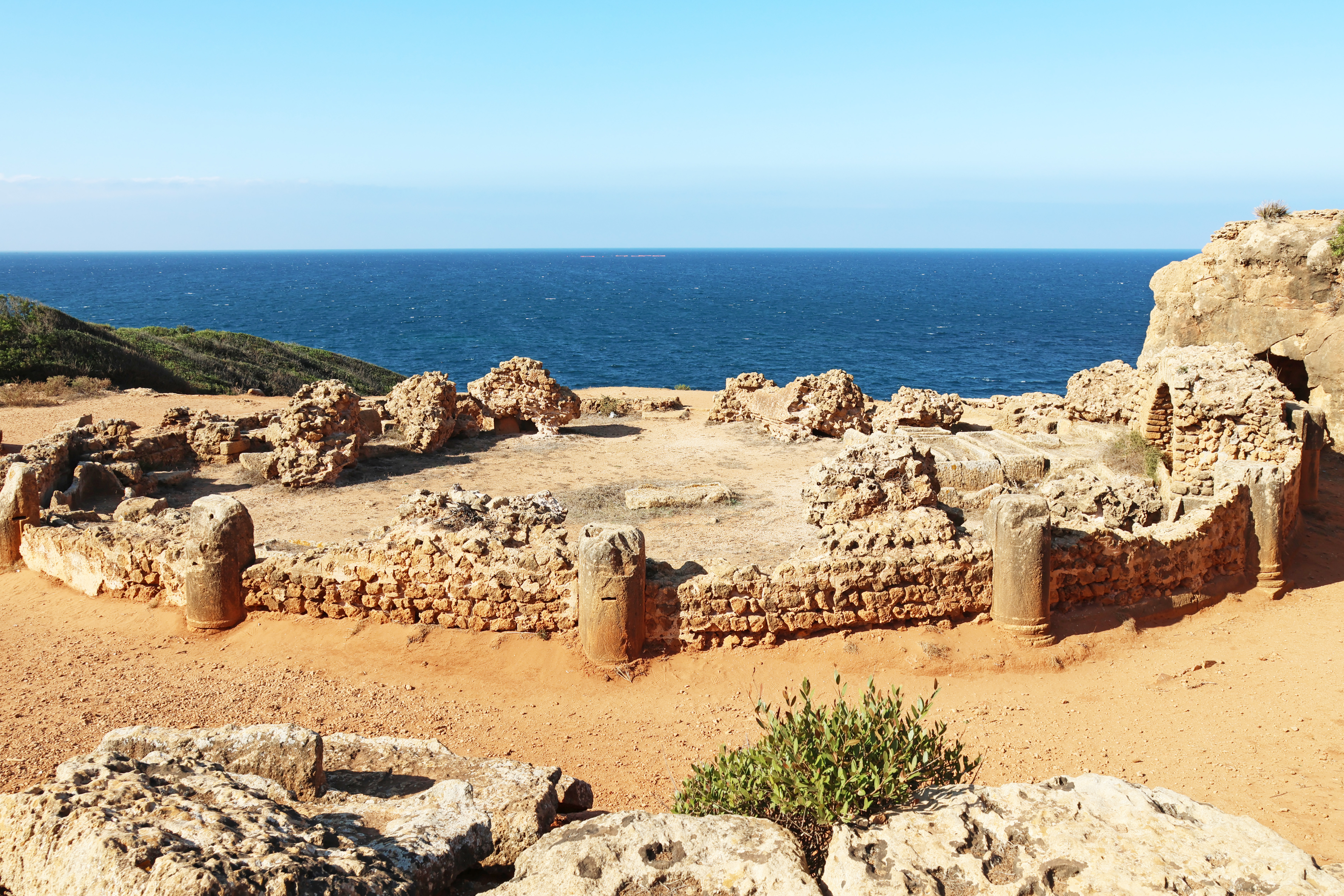
Martyrium

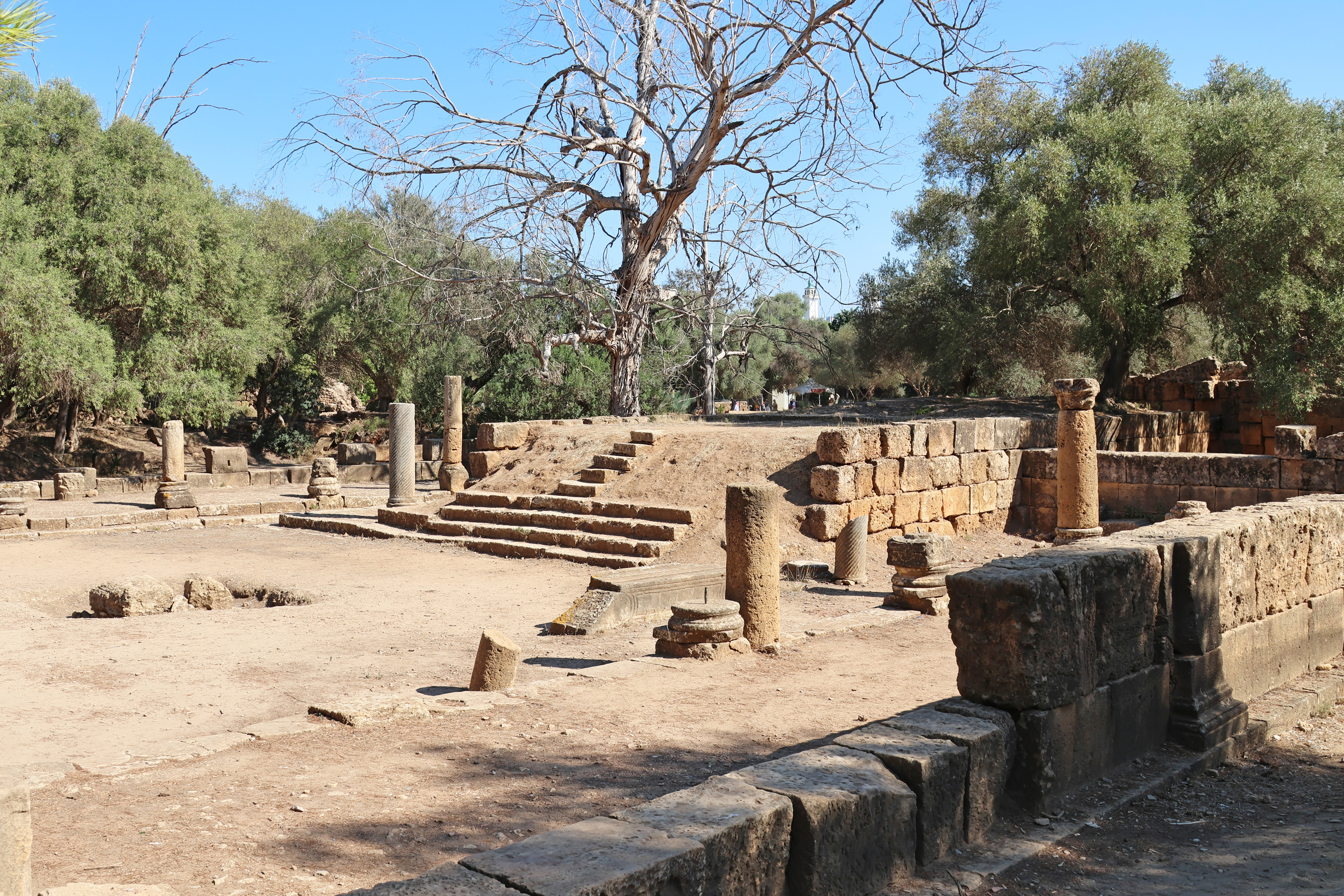
Anonymous Temple

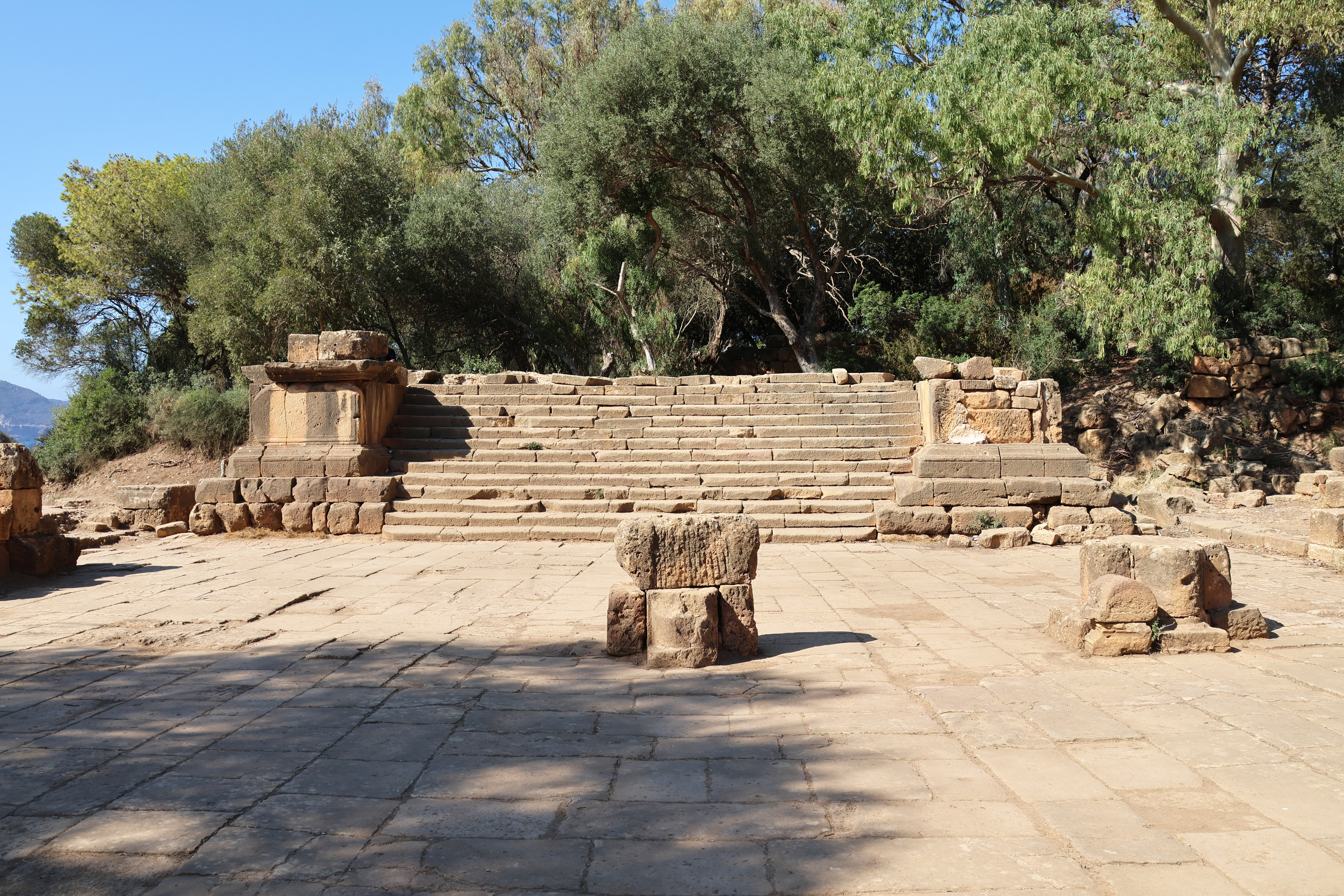
New Temple

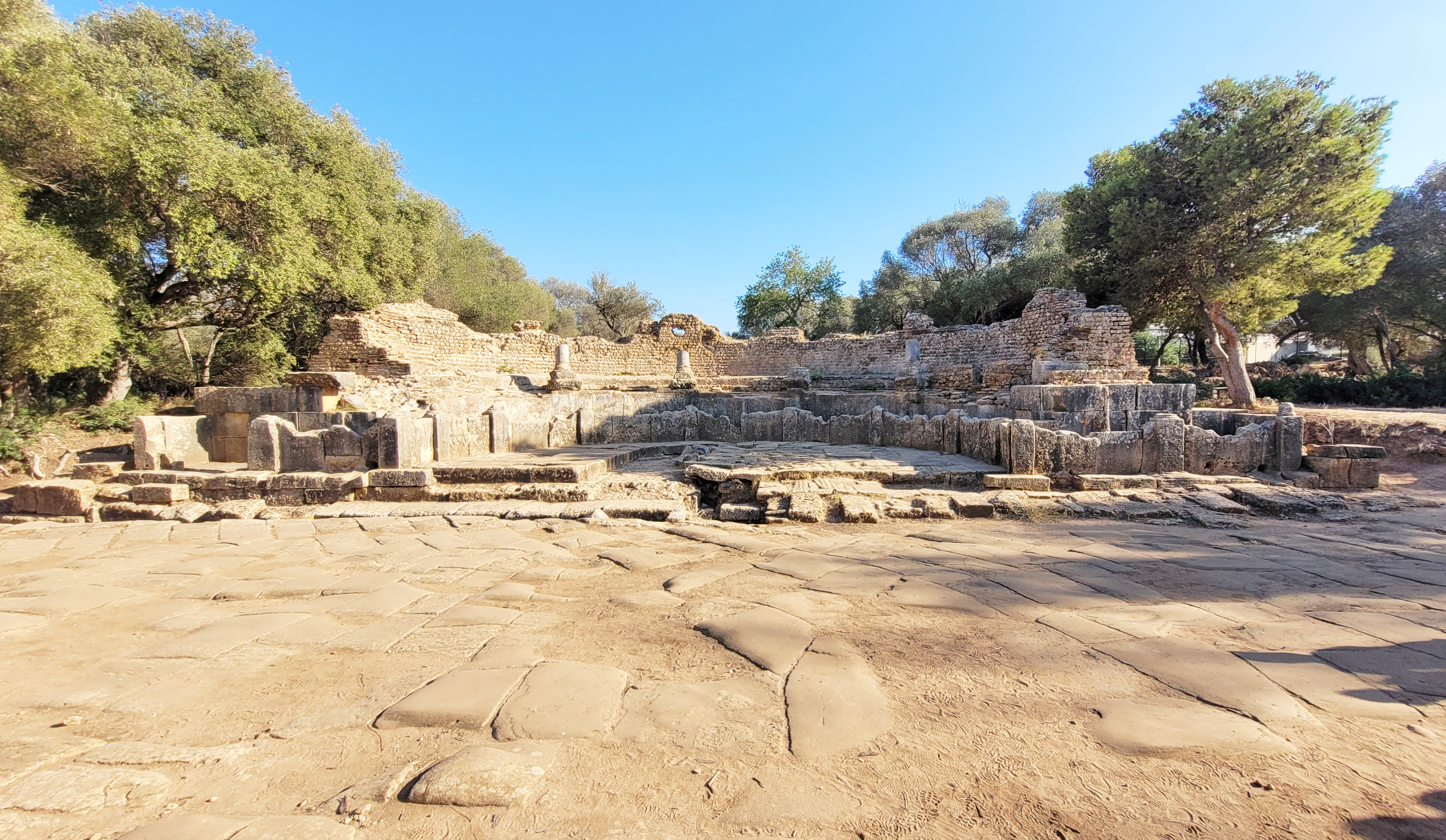
Nymphaeum

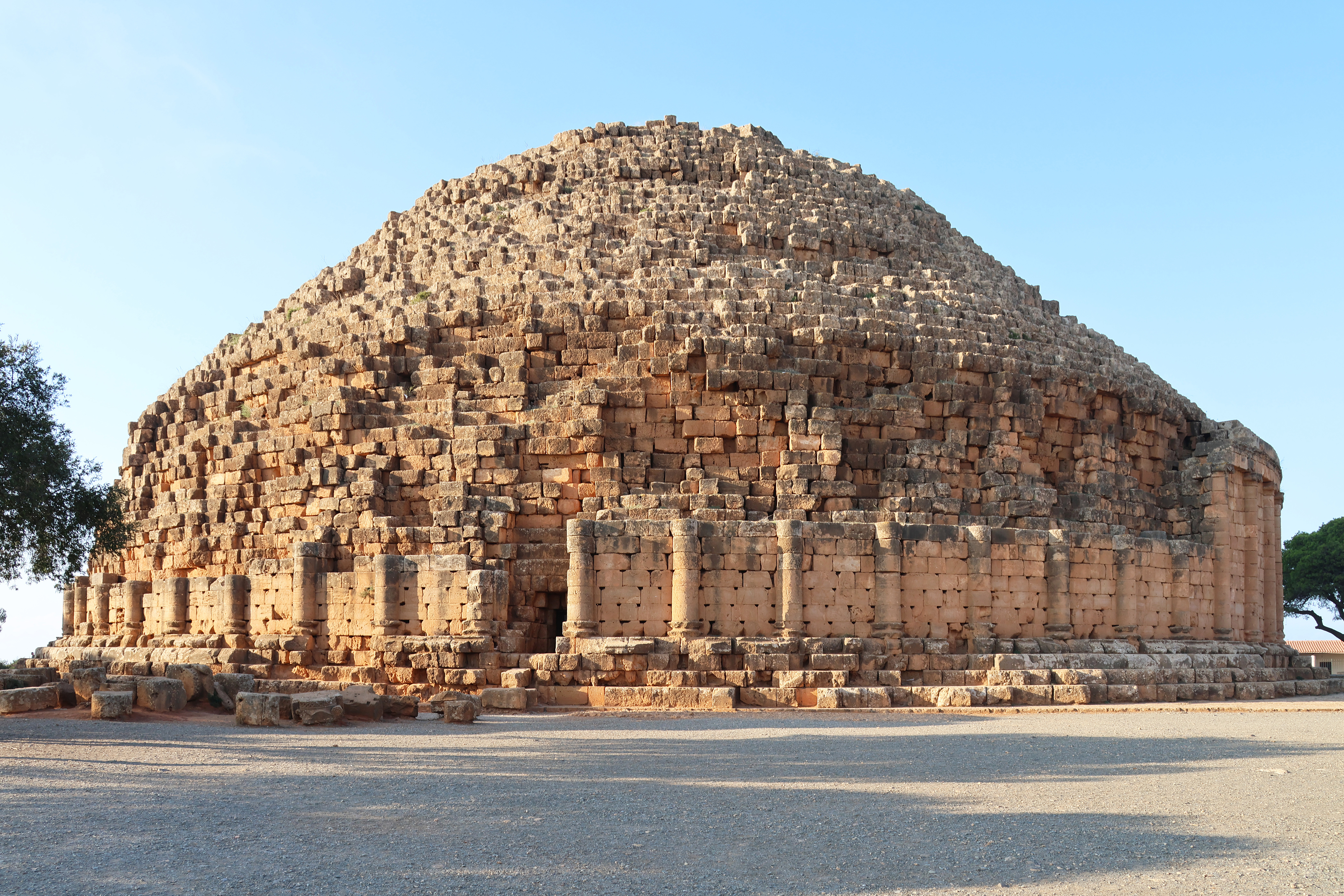
Tomb of Juba II and Cleopatra Selene II

== See also ==
- Timgad
- Caesarea
- Cuicul
- Cirta
- Lambaesis
- Rusadir
