= Omar Hamadi Stadium =

Sports venue in Algiers, Algeria

- Bologhine
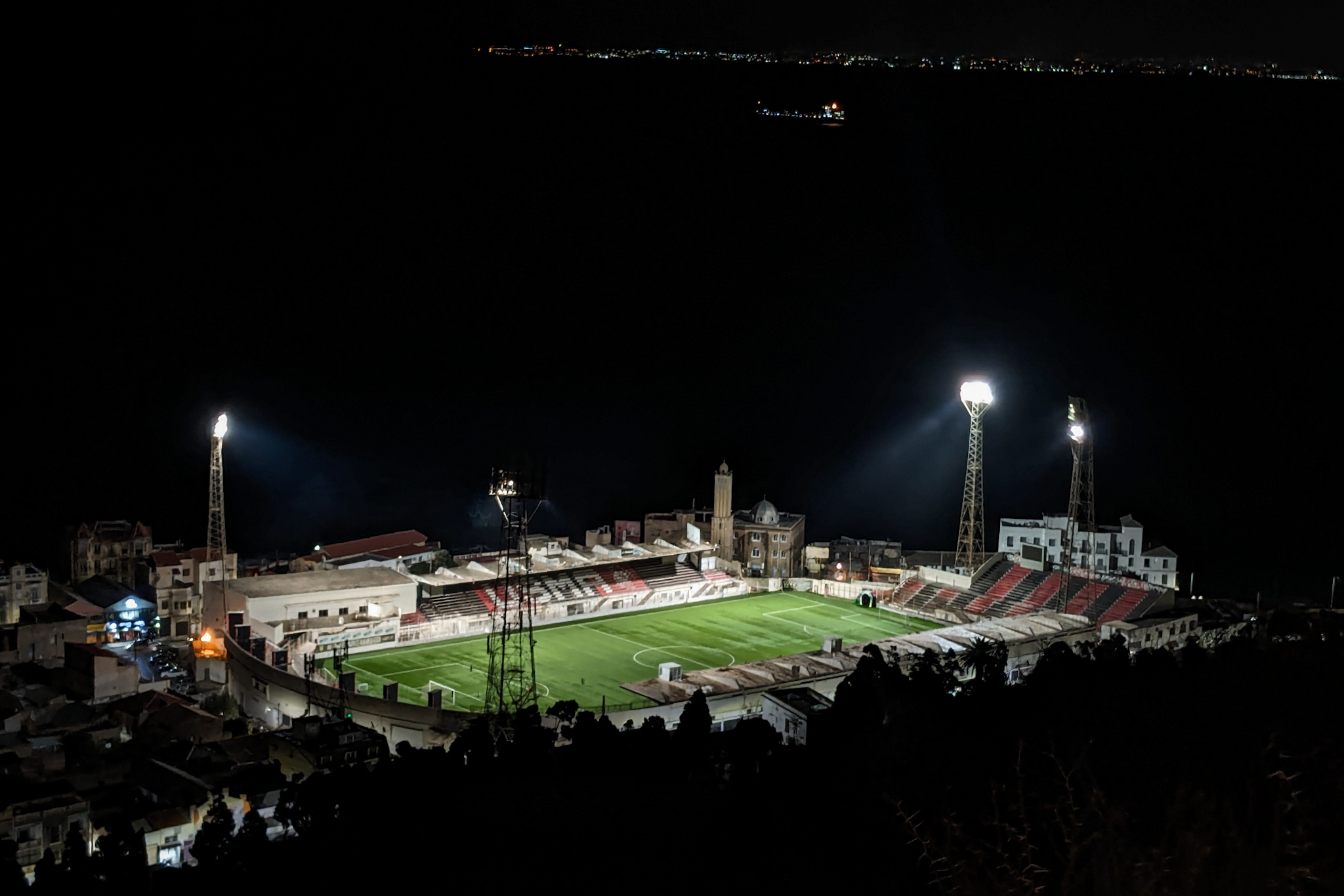
- Omar Hamadi Stadium from Notre-Dame d'Afrique in 2023
- Interactive map of Omar Hamadi Stadium
- Full name: Stade Omar-Hamadi
- Former names: Stade Roger Lapergue (1919–1921); Stade de Saint-Eugène (1921–1962)
- Location: Bologhine, Algiers, Algeria
- Coordinates: 36.801055°N 3.048111°E
- Owner: APC Bologhine
- Operator: USM Alger
- Capacity: 10,000
- Surface: Artificial turf
- Field size: 105 m × 64 m

Construction
- Opened: 19 January 1919
- Renovated: 1980; 2011
- Expanded: 1957 (North stand); 2000 (South stand)
- Closed: 2022

Tenant
- USM Alger

Omar Hamadi Stadium (Arabic: ملعب عمر حمّادي) is a multi-purpose stadium in Bologhine, Algiers, Algeria. It is currently used mostly for football matches and is the home ground of USM Alger. The stadium has a capacity of 10,000 people.

== History ==
=== Opening the stadium ===
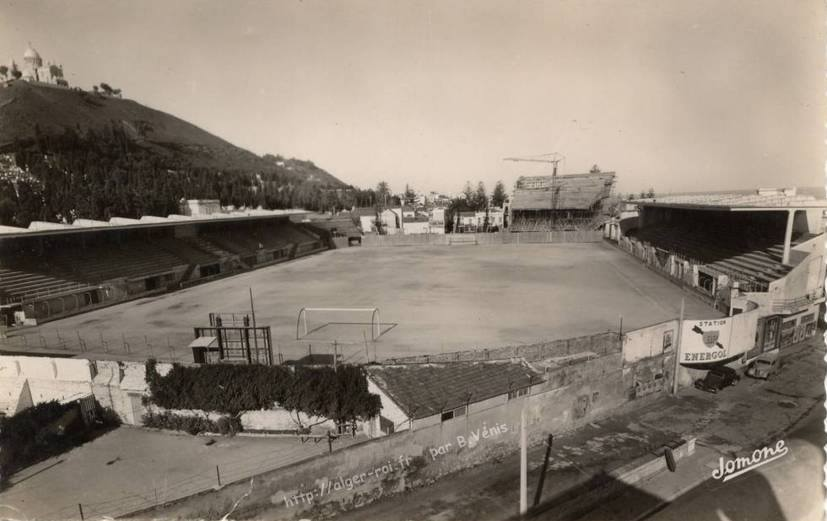
Stade de Saint-Eugène during its construction.

The stadium was built in 1919 as the home ground for l’Association Sportive Saint Eugénoise. For two years, it was known as Stade Roger Lapergue, and its architecture made it one of the most beautiful stadiums of its time. Originally, it featured two side stands and a party hall. It was later renamed Stade Communal de Saint Eugène, adopting the name of the city.

Subsequently, the stadium became available to MC Alger, becoming a prominent venue in the Algiers League. In 1957, a third stand was constructed an arched structure on the south side with two superimposed tiers connecting the original stands. This addition gave the municipal stadium a modern and distinctive look. After Algeria gained independence in 1962, the city of Saint Eugène was renamed Bologhine, reflecting the country’s new identity.

The upper gallery of the stadium was severely damaged at the piers during the 1980 El Asnam earthquake (now Chlef). As a result, it was closed to the public and, after years of neglect and failed restoration efforts, was ultimately demolished in 2003.

The stadium hosted the Algerian Cup final once, in 1970, featuring USM Alger and CR Belcourt. The match ended in a 4–1 victory for CR Belcourt. In 1998, the stadium was renamed Omar Hamadi Stadium, in honor of Omar Hamadi, a former leader of USM Alger and a revolutionary figure. He was sentenced to death during the Algerian War of Independence and was later assassinated along with his two sons in Bouzareah (Algiers) by a terrorist group in 1995.

=== New stand and capacity ===
In 2000, a new stand was built to expand the capacity of USM Alger's home stadium, increasing it by 8,000 to 10,000 seats. As the club holds the concession for the stadium, it also invested in developing infrastructure to support player recovery and training, including a sauna, gym, and restaurant. In 2015, the stadium hosted the first leg of the CAF Champions League final between USM Alger and TP Mazembe, which ended in a 2–1 victory for the latter.

On March 9, 2021, the USM Alger administration renewed its rental contract with the Bologhine Municipality for Omar Hammadi Stadium for a period of one year, at a rate of 80 million centimes per month. The mayor of Bologhine noted that the State Property Directorate used an outdated assessment, which was based on the stadium's previous capacity of 12,000 spectators before the upper stands were demolished. Currently, the stadium accommodates only 7,500 spectators. In April 2023, a technical expert report on the stadium concluded that it was necessary to demolish three stands the northern, southern, and western because they posed a serious safety risk to supporters.

=== Reconstruction of the stadium ===
On August 5, 2024, USM Alger announced that the Omar Hamadi Stadium renovation project has officially been relaunched. This project involves the complete demolition of the current stadium and its reconstruction according to modern standards. The Algiers club said "The club's officials did not fail to highlight all the constraints that slowed down the project and expressed their relief regarding the decisions taken by the authorities. The delegation then inspected the stadium and recorded the necessary notes in order to implement the roadmap as quickly as possible, taking into account what would be best for the Club and its supporters."

On January 23, 2025, the APC of Bologhine stated that in anticipation of the imminent demolition of the Omar Hamadi Stadium, the 17 residents were verbally informed to leave the building and hand over the keys to the commercial building within two weeks.

== See also ==
- Lists of stadiums
- Bologhine Forest
