= Tipaza =

Tipaza Arabic: تيپازة Tamazight: ⵜⵉⵒⴰⵣⴰ
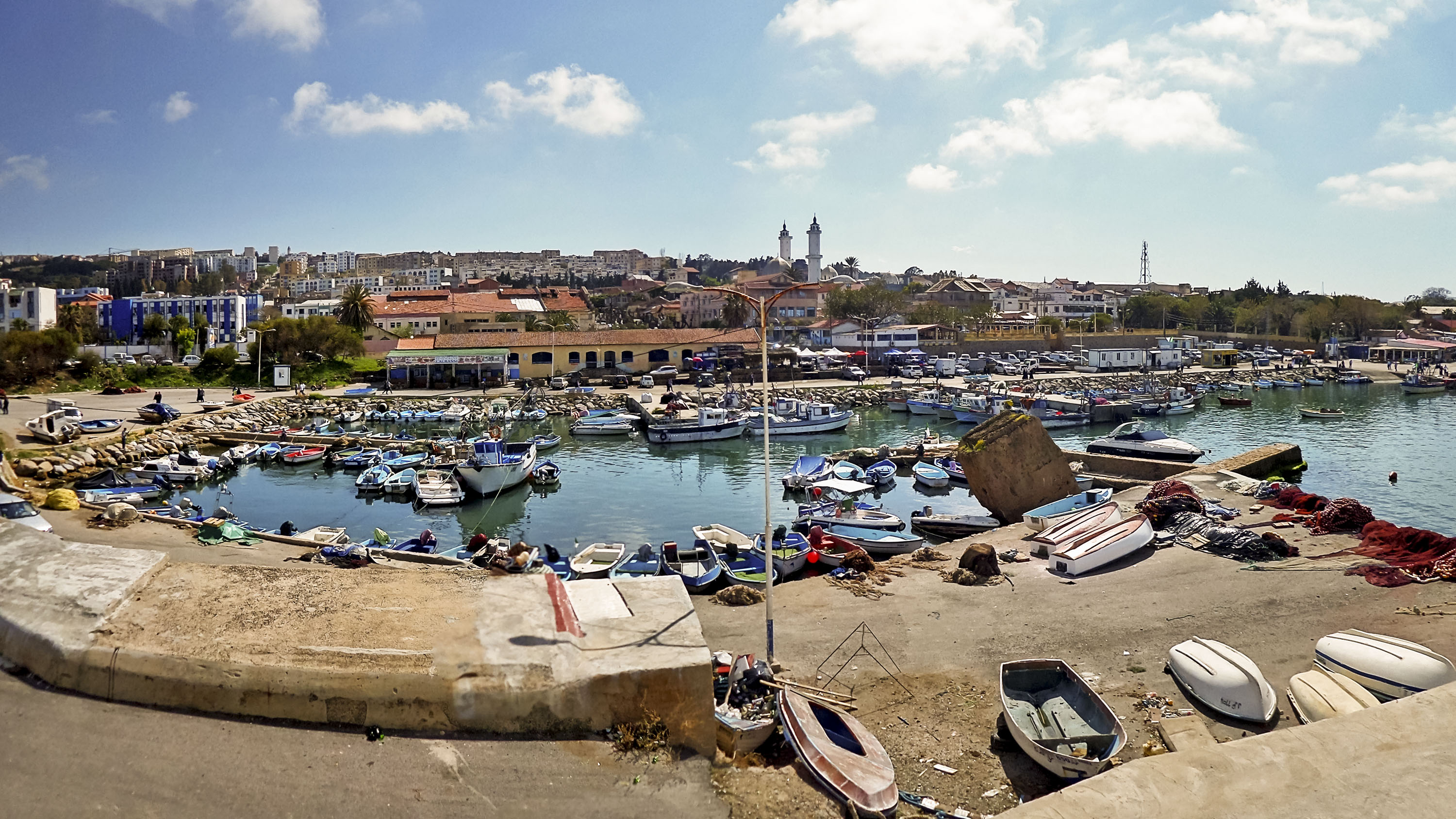
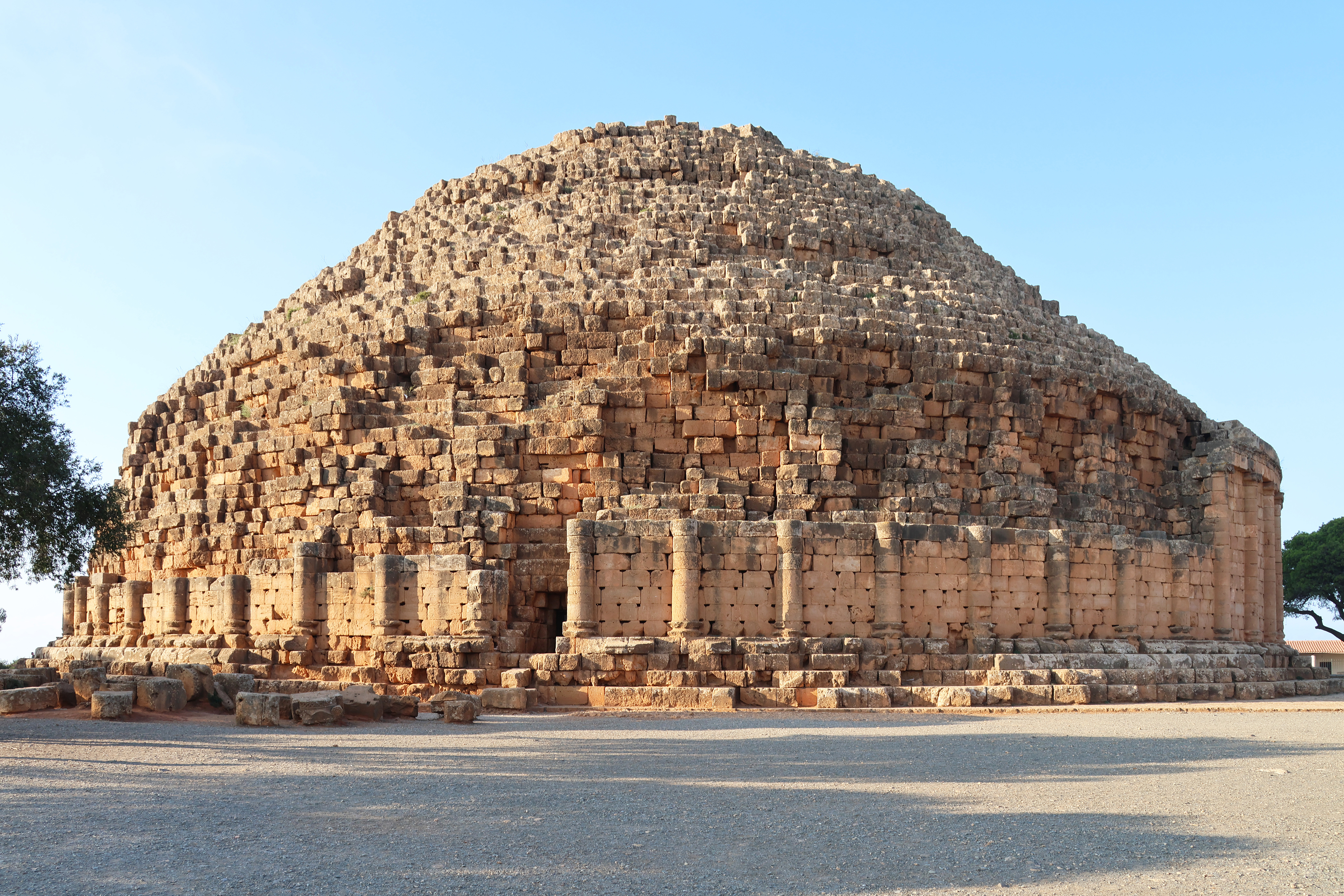
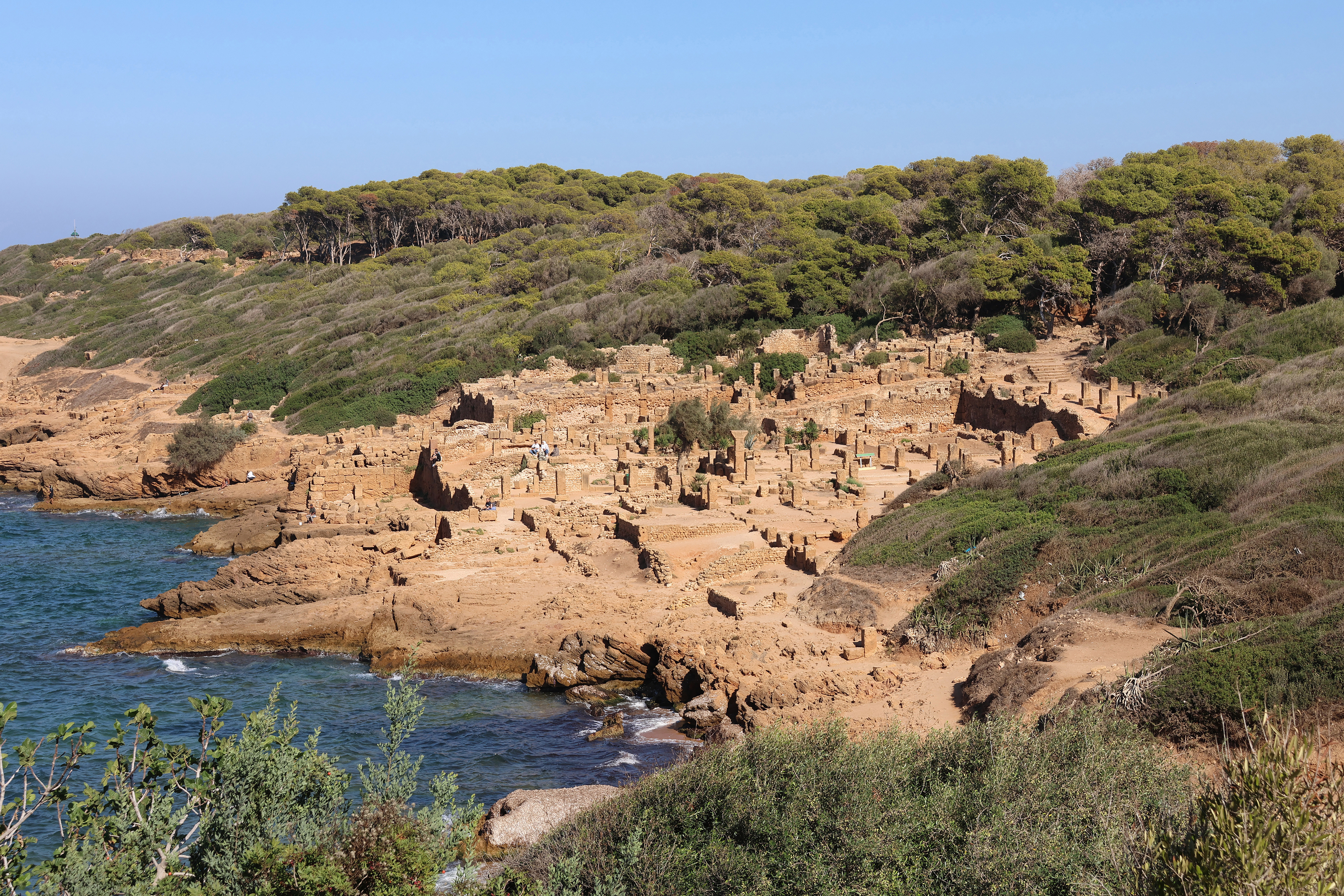
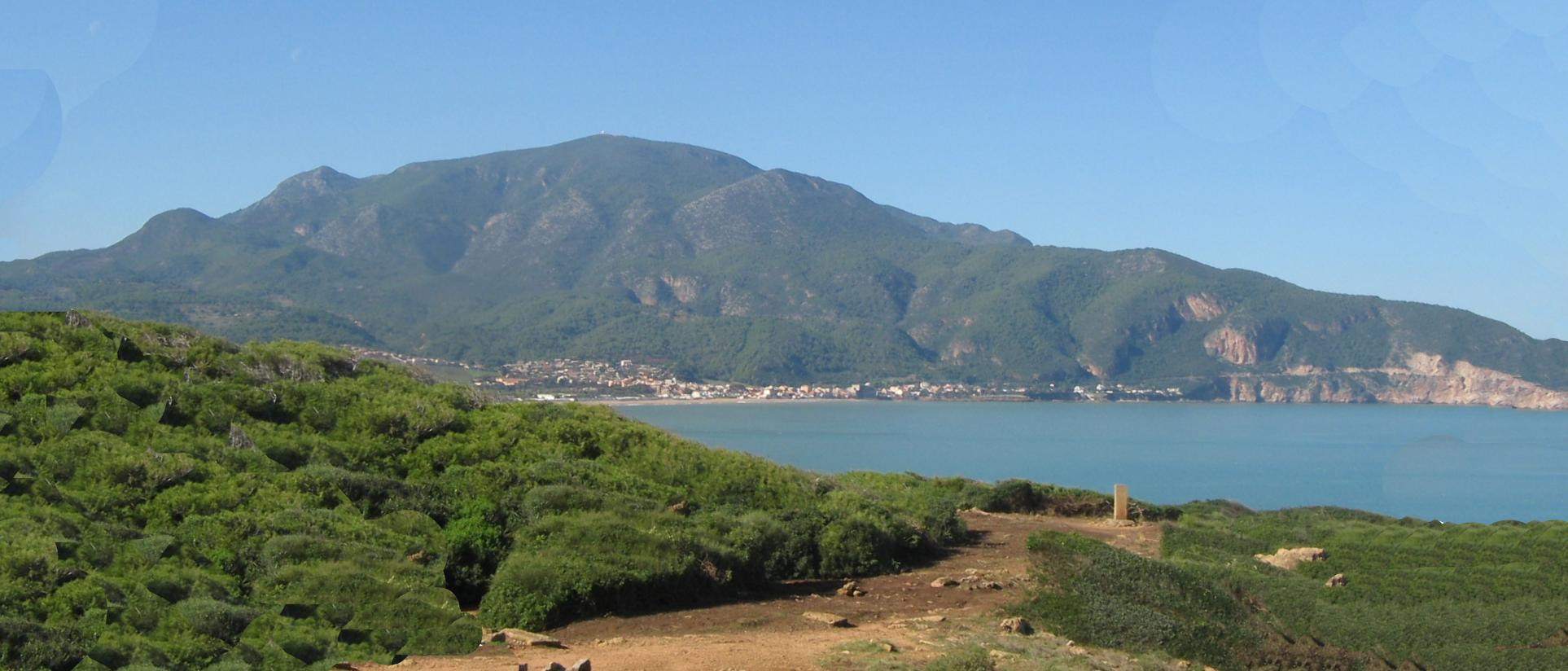
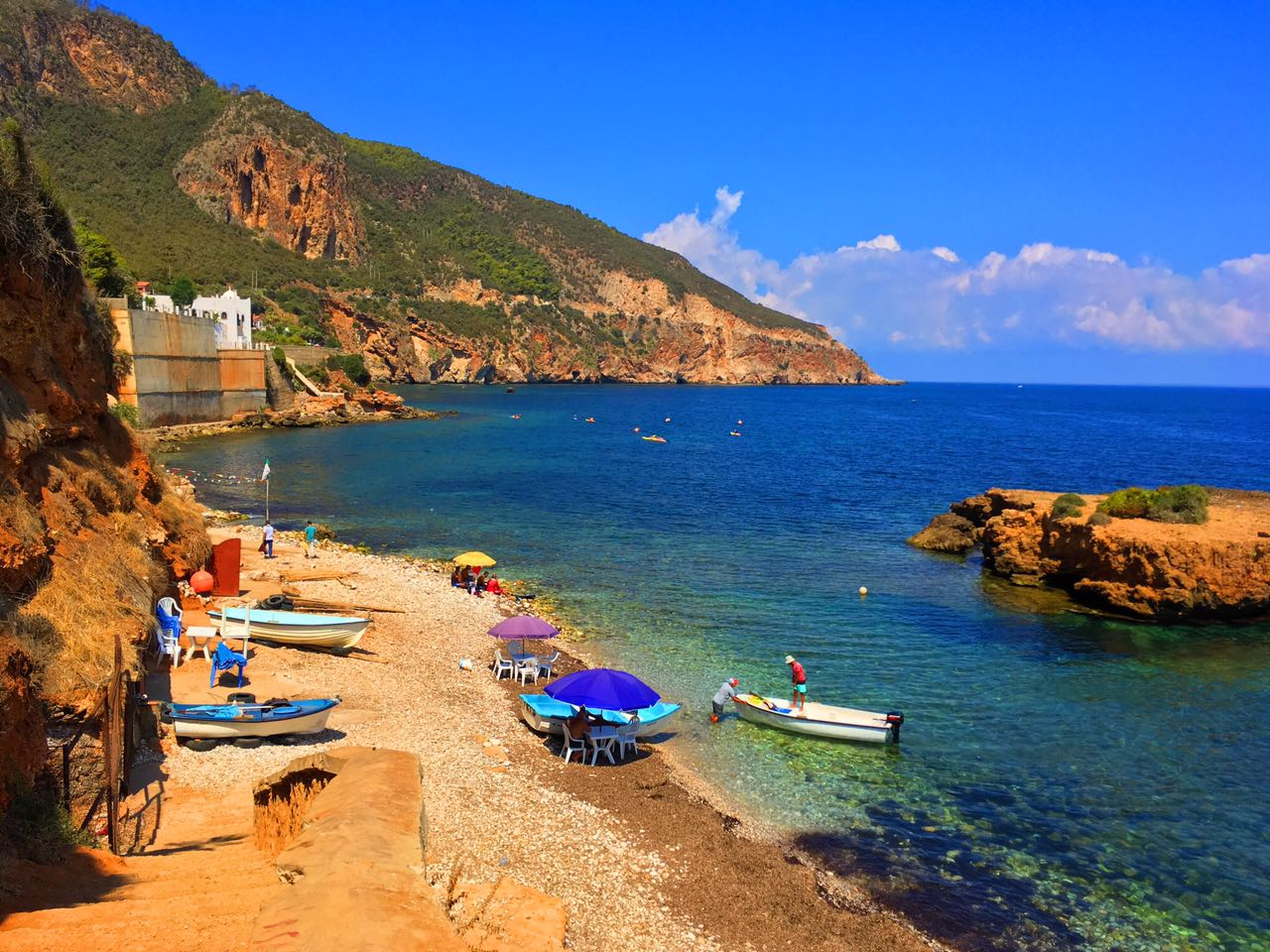
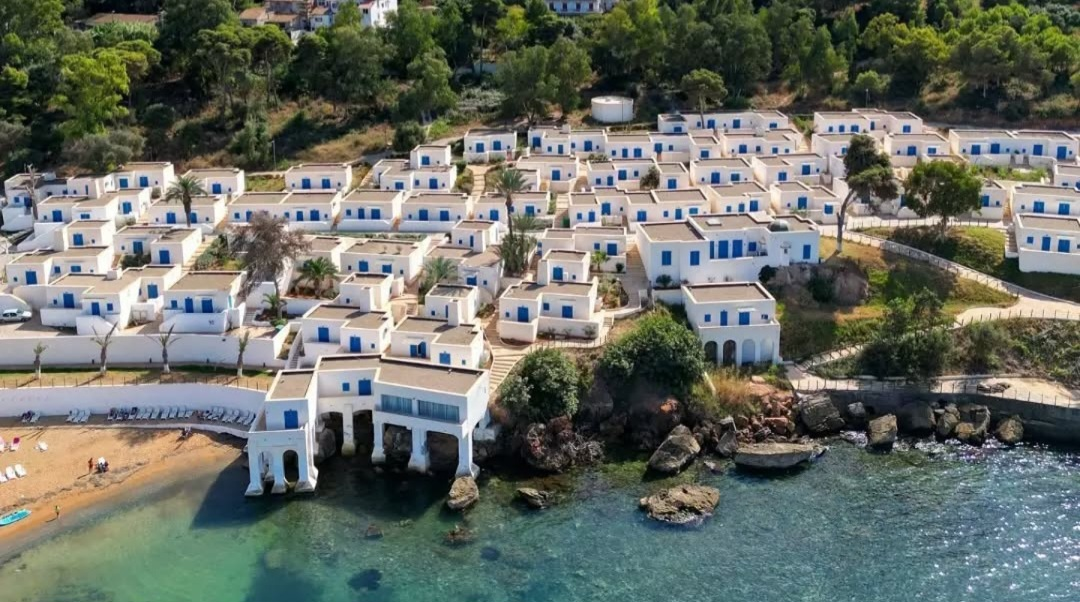
- View of Tipaza and the Port Royal Mausoleum of Mauretania Tipasa Roman Ruins Mount Chenoua Les Gallets Beach CET Touristic Complex

- Location of Tipaza within Tipaza Province

- Location in Algeria
- Coordinates: 36°35′31″N 2°26′58″E
- Country: Algeria
- Province: Tipaza
- District: Tipaza

Population (2008)
  - Total: 25,225
- Climate: Csa
- Tipaza Lighthouse
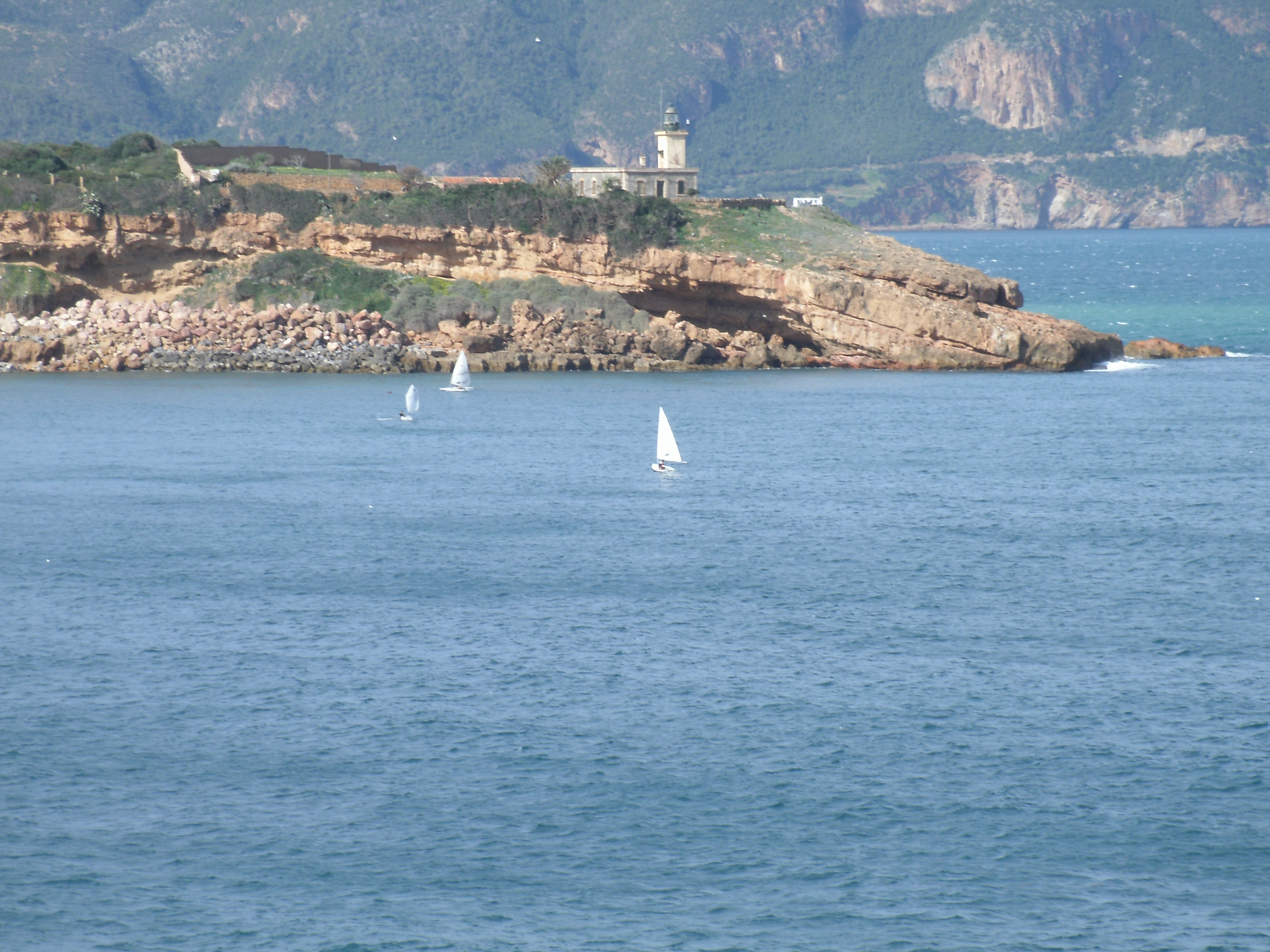
- Tipaza Lighthouse and the promontory
- Constructed: 1867
- Foundation: masonry base
- Construction: masonry tower
- Height: 13 m (43 ft)
- Shape: quadrangular tower with balcony and lantern
- Markings: White (tower), dark green (lantern)
- Power source: mains electricity
- Operator: National Maritime Signaling Office
- Focal height: 34 m (112 ft)
- Range: 18 nmi (33 km; 21 mi)
- Characteristic: Oc W 4s

UNESCO World Heritage Site
- Official name: Tipasa
- Type: Cultural
- Criteria: iii, iv
- Designated: 1982 (6th session)
- Reference no.: 193
- Region: Arab States
- Endangered: 2002–2006

Tipaza (Tamazight: ⵜⵉⵒⴰⵣⴰ, romanized: Tipaza, Arabic: تيپازة, romanized: Tīpāza) is the capital of the Tipaza Province, Algeria. When it was part of the Roman Empire, it was called Tipasa. The modern town was founded in 1857, and is chiefly remarkable for its ancient ruins and sandy littoral.

== History ==
=== Ancient history ===
Tipasa, as the city was then called, was an old Punic trading-post conquered by Ancient Rome. It was subsequently turned into a military colony by the emperor Claudius for the conquest of the kingdoms of Mauretania.

Afterwards, it became a municipium called Colonia Aelia Tipasensis, that reached a population of 20,000 inhabitants in the fourth century according to Stéphane Gsell.

The city served as an important Christian hub during the last centuries of Roman governorship, with three basilicas.

Tipasa was destroyed by the Vandals in 430 CE, but was reconstructed by the Byzantines one century later. At the end of the seventh century the city was demolished by Umayyad forces and reduced to ruins.

In the nineteenth century, the place was settled again. Now it is a town of nearly 30,000 inhabitants. The city is an important tourist place in modern Algeria, mainly because of the Tipasa ruins.

=== Modern era ===
Near Tipaza, the Tipaza longwave transmitter broadcasts French language Channel 3 radio programs from the Algerian Broadcasting Company. The longwave frequency 252 kHz can be well received in many parts of Europe.

The town and its surroundings are home to the largest Berber-speaking group of western Algeria, the Chenoua people. Majority of the Bouriba family reside in this area.

The Tipaza station in 252 kHz had previously been out of service since March 17, 2014, but is broadcasting again at 252 kHz.

== Gallery ==
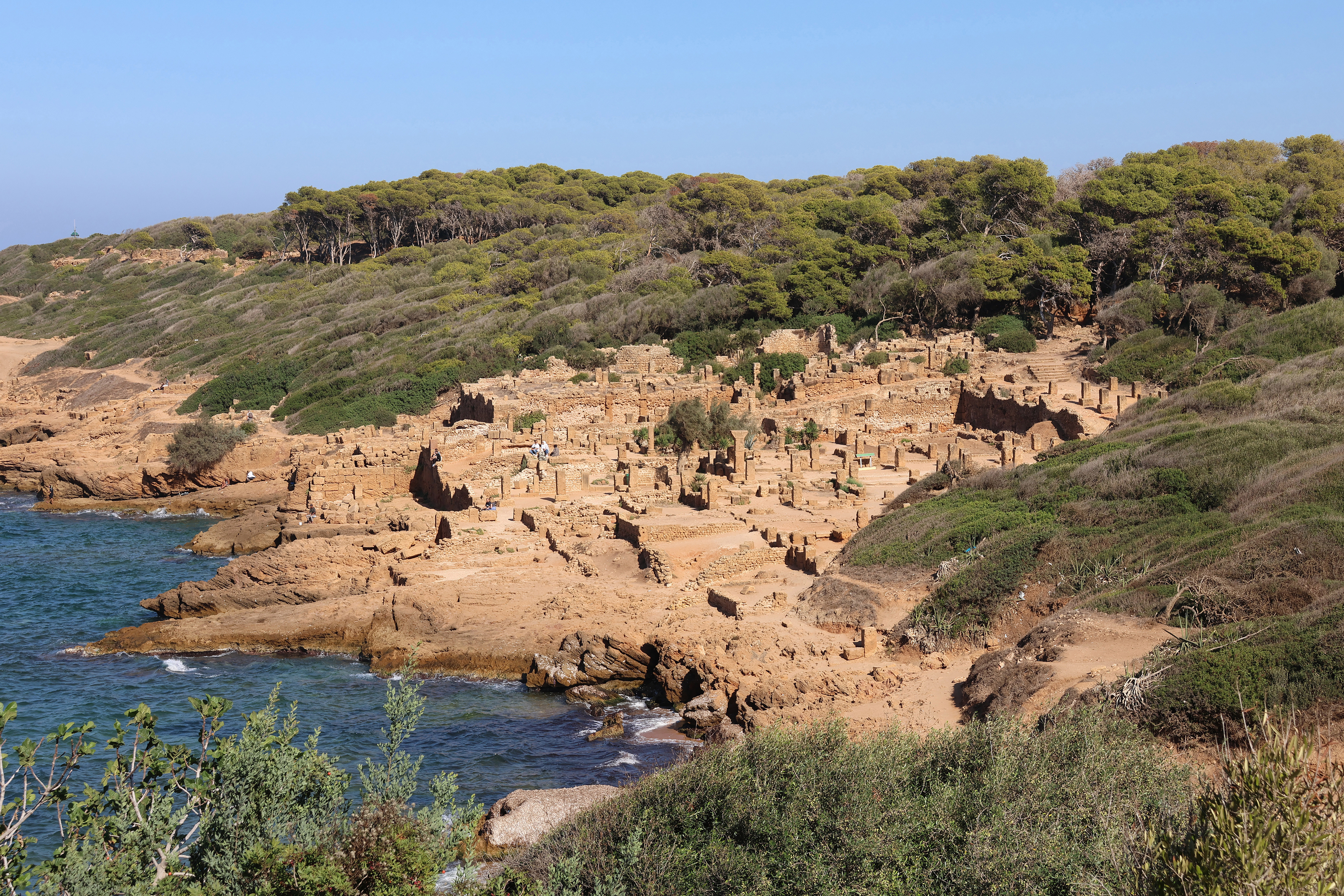
Ruins of Roman Tipasa

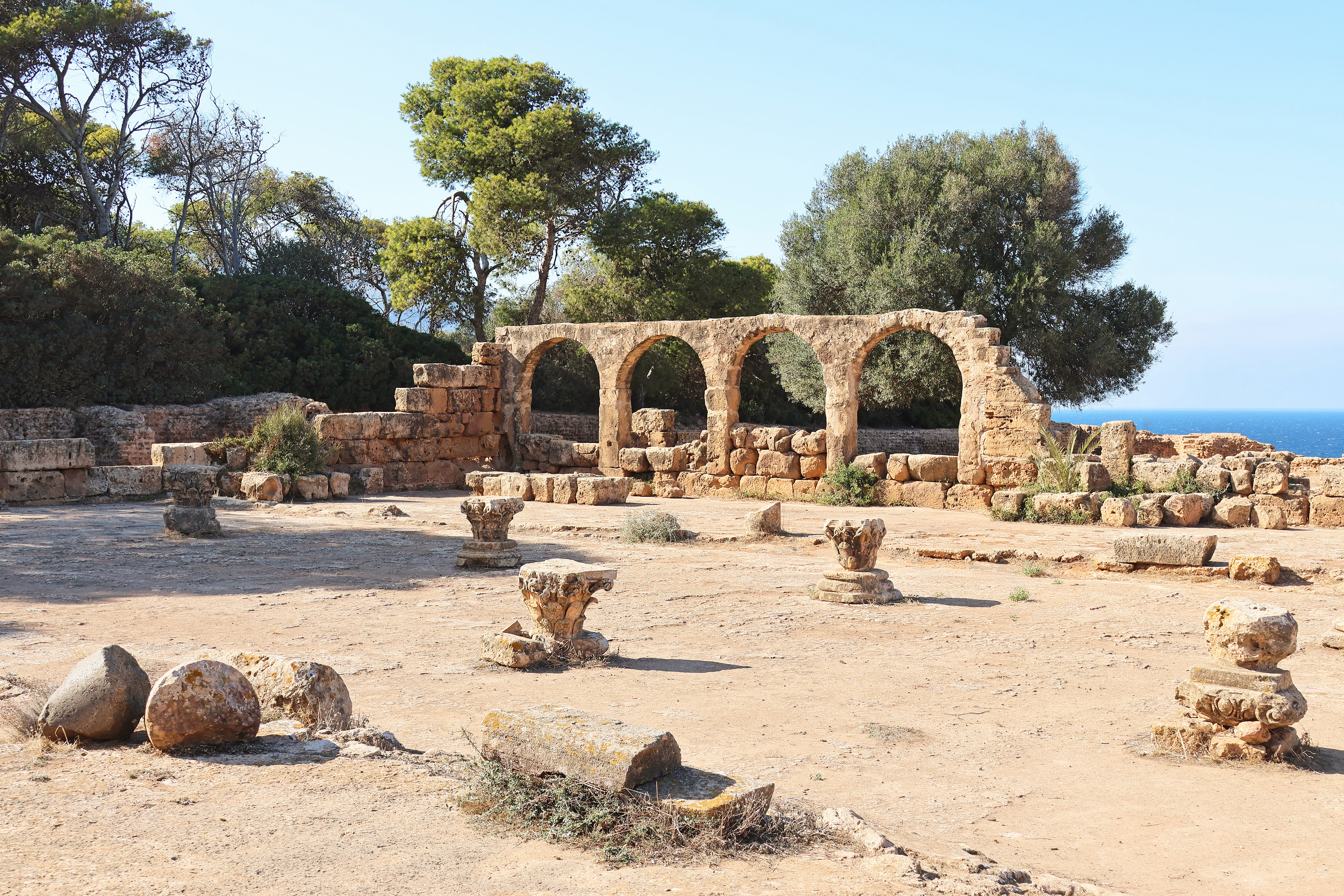
Christian basilica

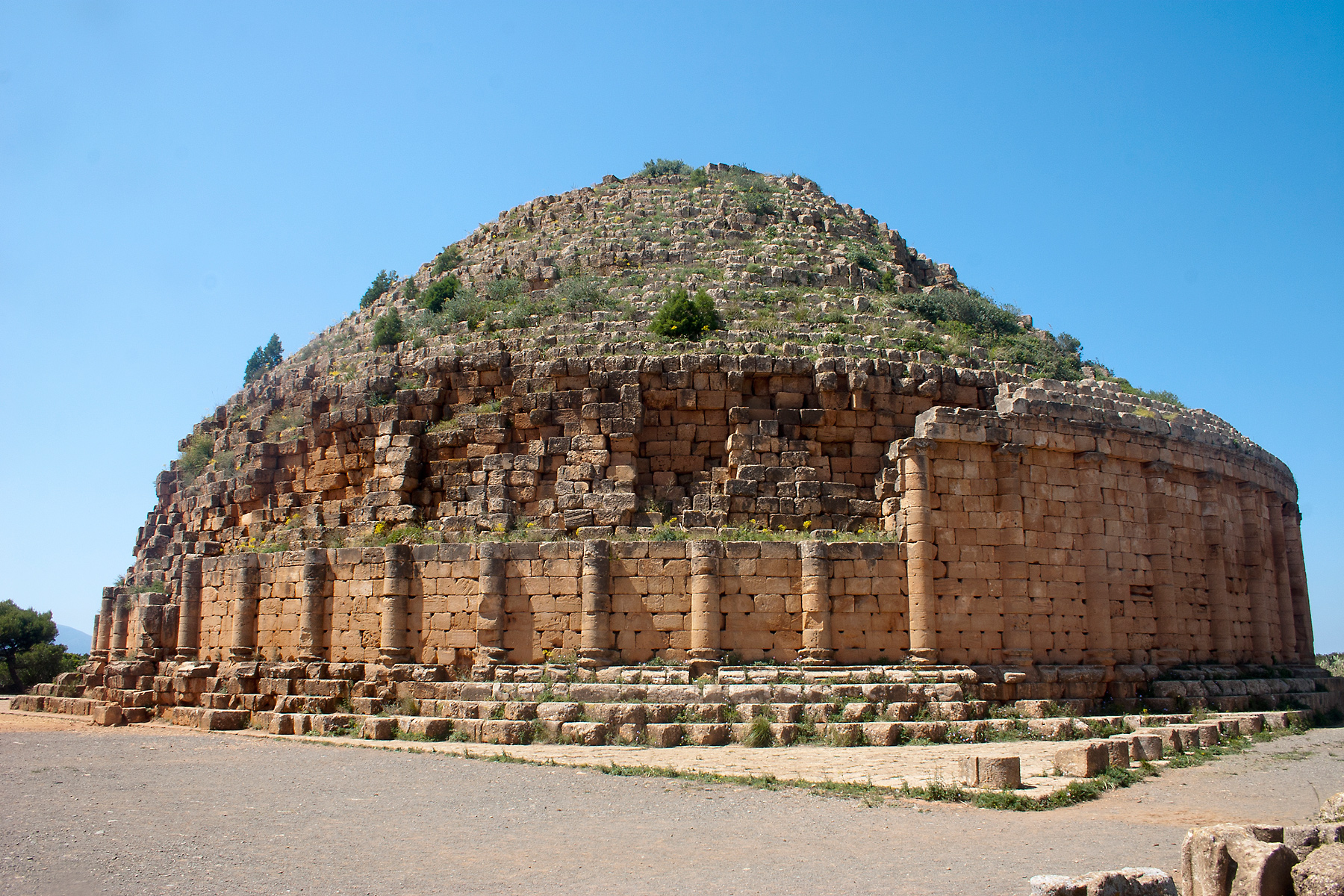
The Royal Mausoleum of Mauritania

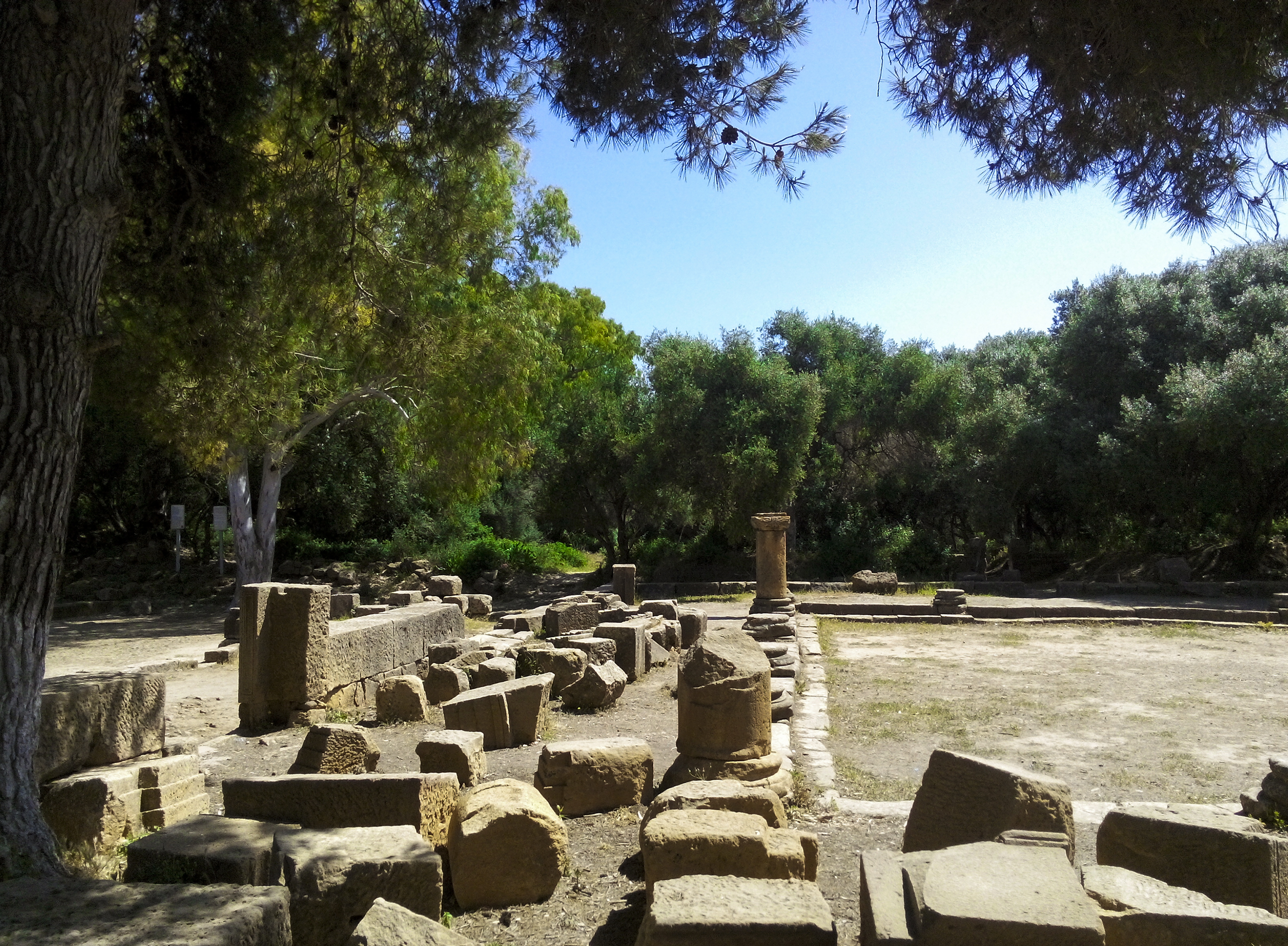
The Anonymous Temple

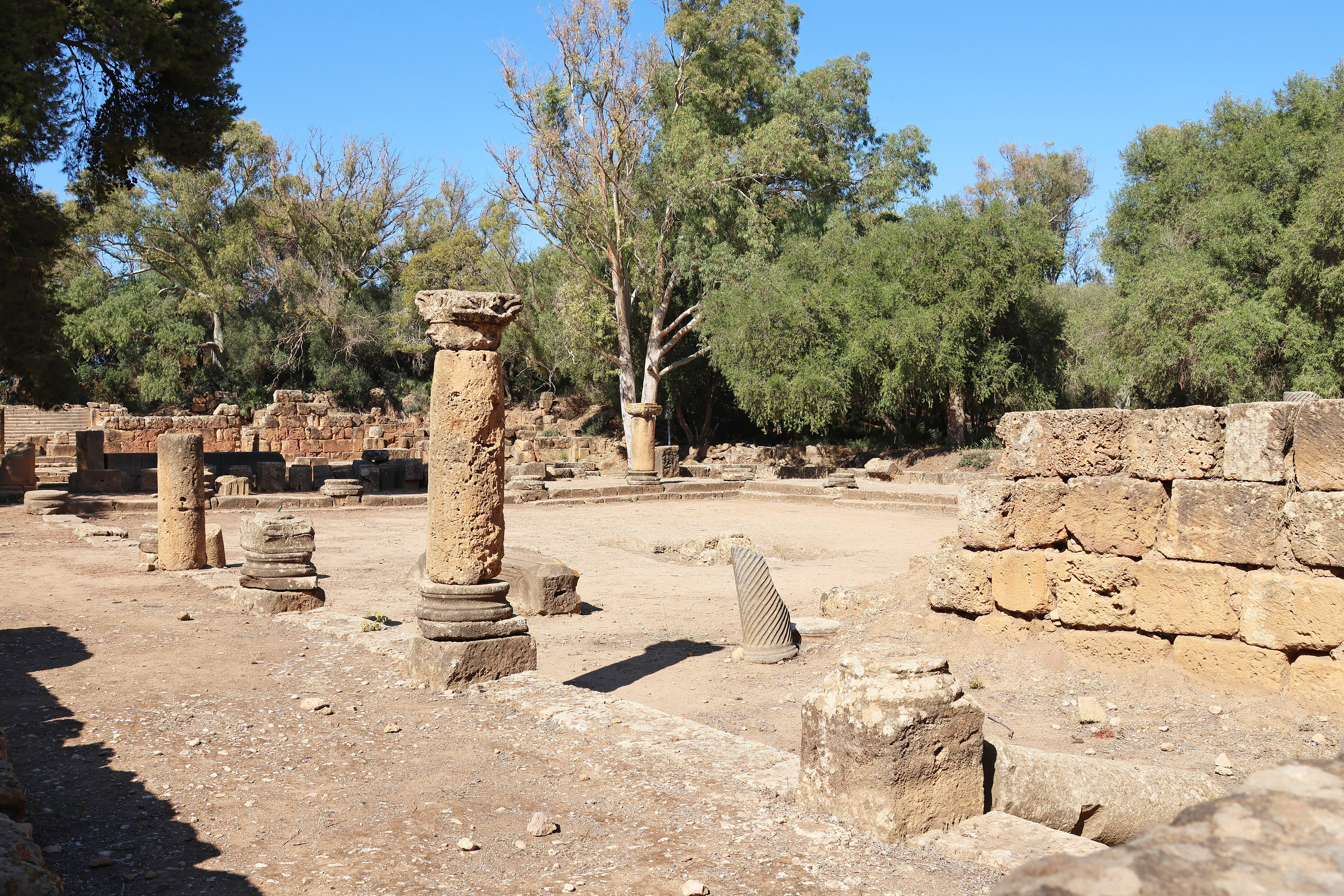
The New Temple

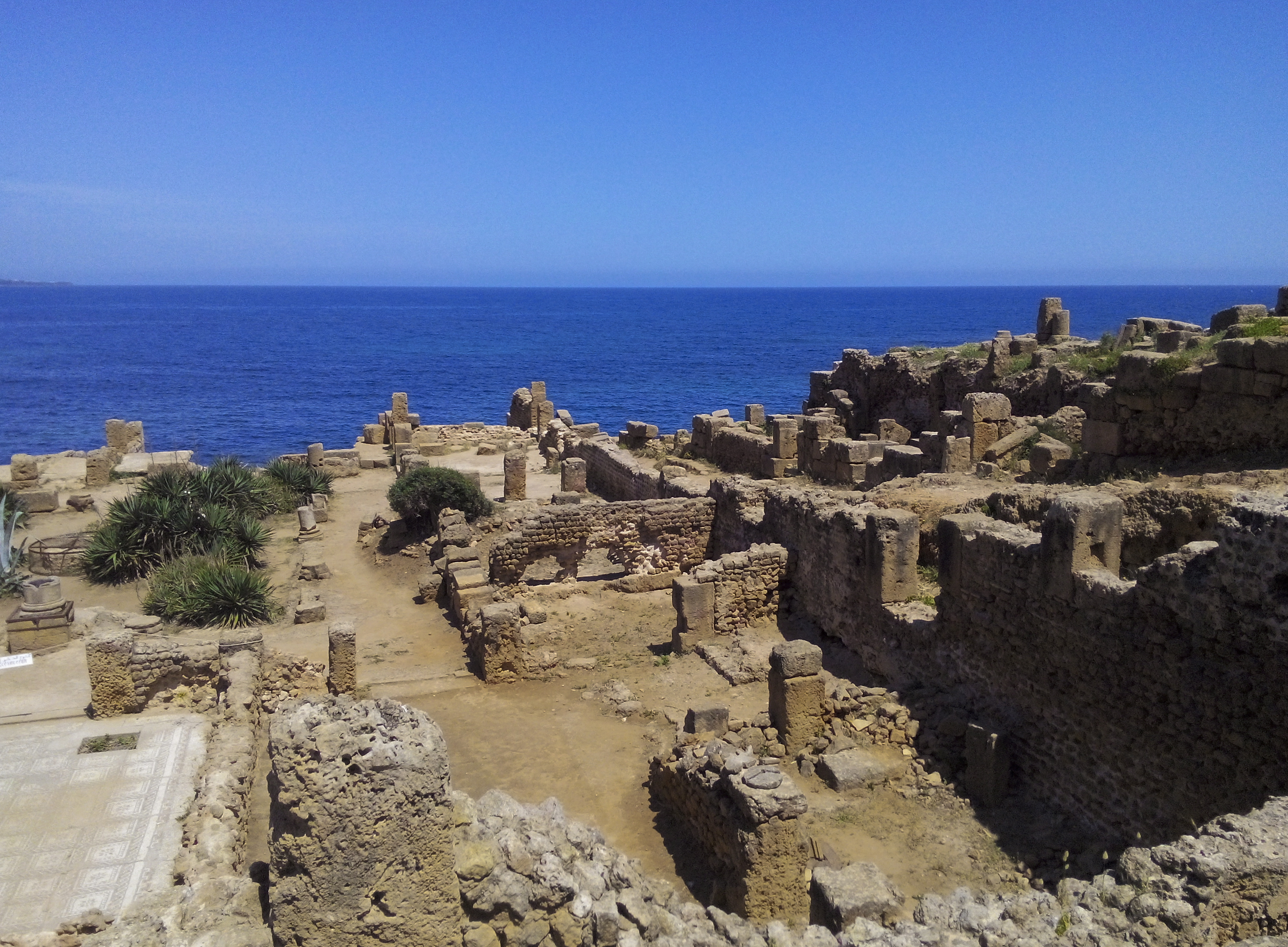
Villa des Fresques

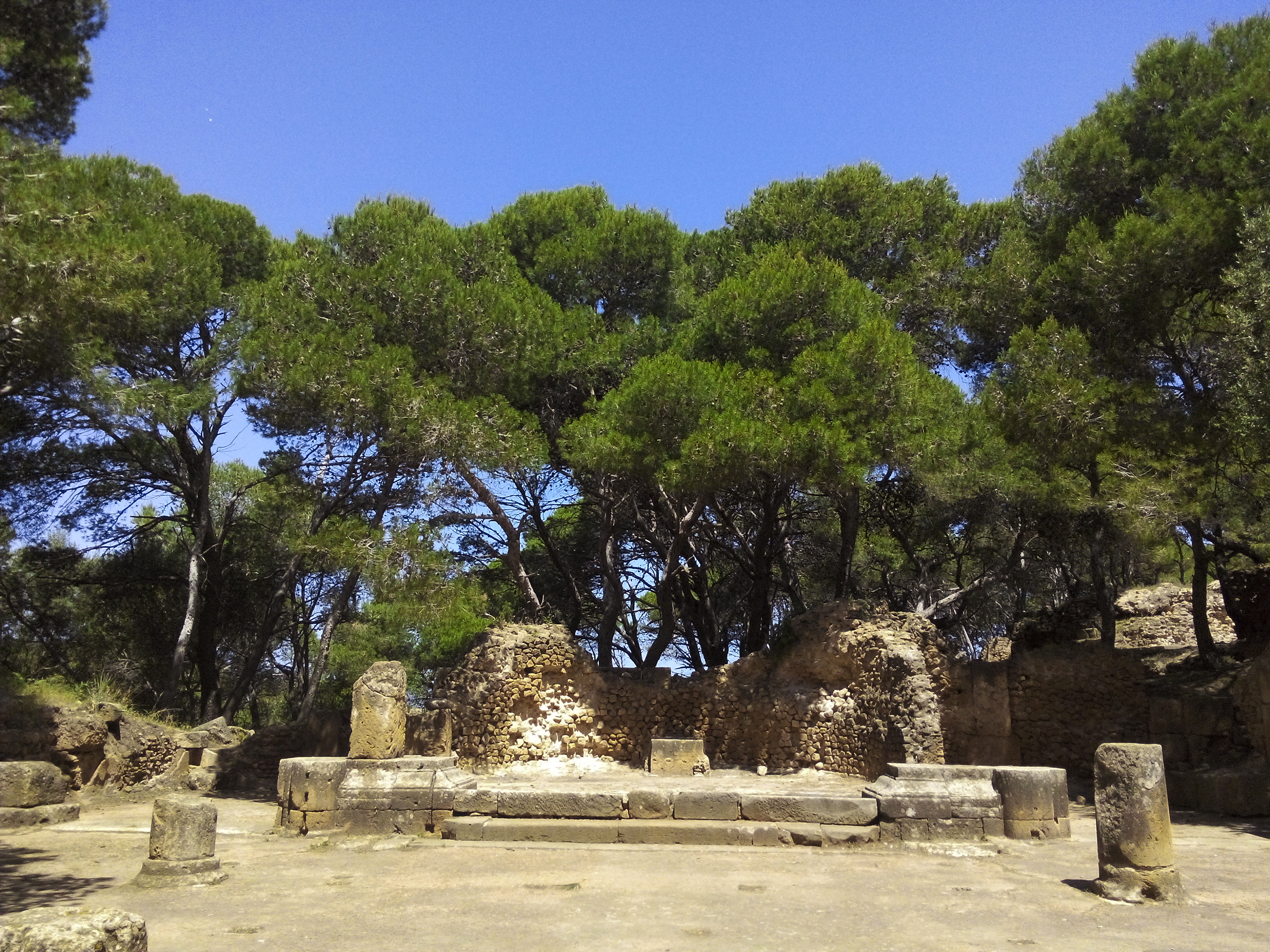
La Basilique Judiciaire

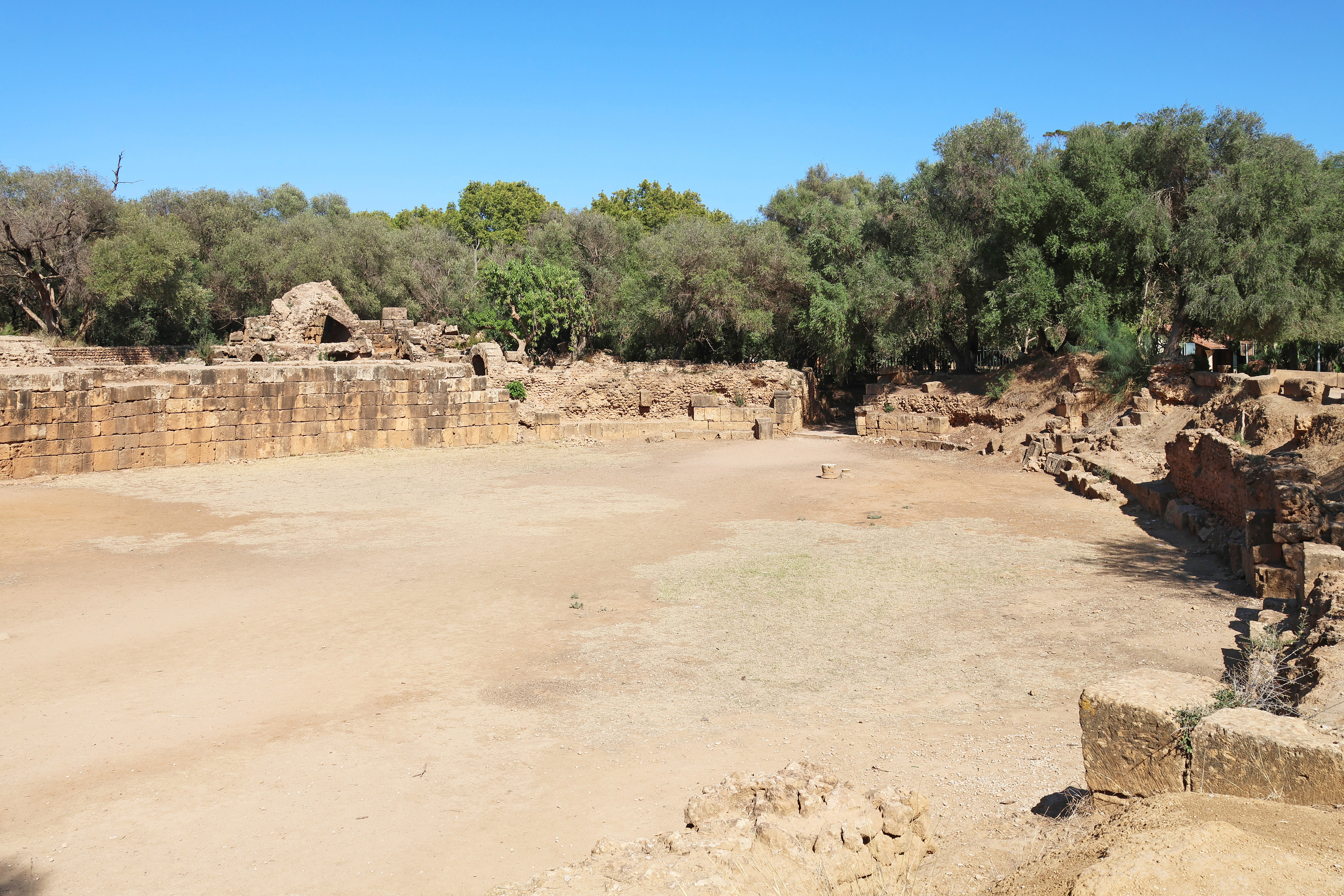
Amphitheatre

== See also ==
- List of lighthouses in Algeria
- Tipasa
- Tipaza Province
- Ain Taya Forest
- El-Marsa Forest
- Algeria
- Mahelma Forest
- Bologhine Forest
- El-Mouradia Forest
- Bachdjerrah forest
