= Tipaza District =

- District
- Country: Algeria
- Province: Tipaza Province
- Capital: Tipaza
- Seat: Tipaza

Population (2008)
  - Total: 25,225
- Time zone: UTC+1 (CET)

The Tipaza district is an Algerian Berber Speaking administrative district in the Tipaza province and its capital is located on the eponymous city of Tipaza.

== Location ==
The district is located in the north of the Tipaza province.

== Communes ==
The district is composed of only one commune: Tipaza.
