= El Mouradia =

Coordinates: 36°45′N 3°03′E

- Interactive map of El Mouradia
- Country: Algeria
- Province: Algiers
- Time zone: UTC+1 (West Africa Time)

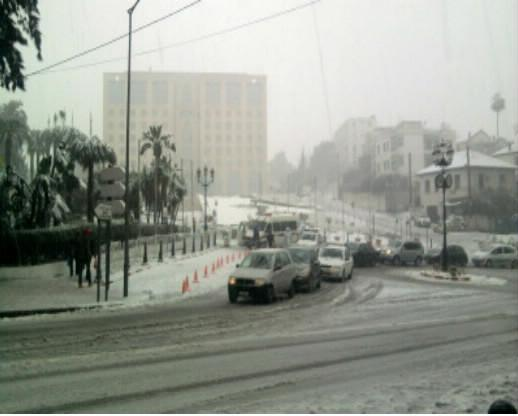
A street view of El Mouradia covered in snow in Algiers, Algeria

El Mouradia-El Golf (Arabic: المرادية) is a municipality in Algiers Province, Algeria. It is administratively part of Sidi M'Hamed district. Its municipal code is 1627 and postal code is 16035 and it has a population of 29,503 as of the 1998 census, which gives it 11 seats in the PMA.

The Ministry of National Education and the Ministry of Foreign Affairs have their head offices in El Mouradia, as does the Embassy of Finland. El Mouradia Palace is the Algerian president's office.

== Other meanings ==
El Mouradia Palace is also the name of the main presidential palace in Algeria. It is a Moorish style villa pre-dating independence that was chosen to house the Algerian presidency's main offices, including the Algerian president's office itself. El Mouradia symbolises the Algerian presidency therefore just like the White House or the Kremlin symbolise the American or Russian presidencies. Entrance is guarded by dismounted troops from the Algerian Republican Guard (Republican Cavalry).

== See also ==
- El-Mouradia Forest
