= Bachdjerrah Forest =

Forest in Bachdjerrah, Algeria

Geography
- Location: Algeria
- Coordinates: 36°43′43″N 3°06′55″E

Bachdjerrah Forest (also known as Palm Forest), is a small woodland situated in Bachdjerrah, Algiers, Algeria. It is managed by the Forest Conservation Authority of Algiers and overseen by the General Directorate of Forests.

== History ==
Bachdjerrah Forest had been neglected since 1984 due to the encroachment of informal buildings surrounding the area. In 2012, the Algerian government initiated a program to remove and relocate informal settlements. This project was completed in 2015.

== Location ==
Bachdjerrah Forest is located 18 kilometers east of Algiers, 70 kilometers east of Tipaza, and approximately 4 kilometers from the Mediterranean Sea, in the town of Ain Taya within the Mitidja plain.
