= El-Mouradia Forest =

Forest in Algiers Province, Algeria

- Location within Algiers
- Interactive map of El-Mouradia Forest

Geography
- Location: El Mouradia,, Algiers Province, Algeria
- Coordinates: 36°45′03″N 3°2′42″E
- Elevation: 50 m (160 ft)
- Area: 57 acres (23 ha)

El-Mouradia Forest or Atlas Forest is situated in El-Mouradia, within Algiers Province. It is overseen by the Directorate of Forests and Green Belt of the Province of Algiers, under the guidance of the General Directorate of Forestry Algeria.

== History ==
The park extends along Boudjemaa Souidani Street and was previously designated as Boulogne Forest before Algeria attained independence in 1962. Following the country's independence, the forest was renamed as Atlas Forest. This Conifer Forest, approximately a century old, is under the authority of the President of Algeria. The forest is home to a diverse array of tree species, including Pinus halepensis, Stone pine, Eucalyptus, and olive trees.

== Reforestation ==
The forest is a component of the national reforestation plan, which aims to expand its area to approximately 30 hectares (74 acres) to enhance the natural space and recreational areas in Algeria.

== Geography ==
El-Mouradia Forest is 70 kilometers east of Tipaza and 4 kilometers from the Mediterranean Sea. The forest is located within the municipality of El-Mouradia and encompasses an area of 23 hectares (approximately 57 acres).

== See also ==
- Muqras Mountain
- Lake Sidi Mohamed Benali
- Bachdjerrah forest
