= Forest Conservation Authority of Algiers =

Administrative body in Algiers

- مديرية الغابات والحزام الأخضر لولاية الجزائر
- Founded: 25 July 1995
- Type: Territorial administration
- Purpose: Sustainable forest management; forest planning; forest exploitation
- Headquarters: Algiers, Algeria
- Region served: Wilaya of Algiers
- Products: Timber; Game
- Key people: Noureddine Baâziz (Conservator of Forests of Algiers)
- Parent organization: Directorate General of Forests; Ministry of the Interior; Ministry of Agriculture
- Website: http://dgf.org.dz/

The Conservation of Forests of Algiers (CFA; Arabic: مديرية الغابات والحزام الأخضر لولاية الجزائر) is a public territorial body of the Algerian State responsible for managing the forests of the Wilaya of Algiers. It operates under the supervision of the Directorate General of Forests (Direction Générale des Forêts, or DGF) and is based in Algiers.

== History ==
The Conservation of Forests of Algiers (CFA) was created by decree No. 95–201 on 25 July 1995. Its organization, under the authority of the Directorate General of Forests, defined by decree No. 95-333 of 25 October 1995.

The CFA's mission is to plan, administer, protect, develop and manage the forest and alfa (plant used in pastoralism) patrimony in the Wilaya of Algiers, within the framework of the national and wilaya forest policy.

== Organisation ==
The CFA is organised into services and offices, adapted to the specific needs of the Wilaya of Algiers. These services are limited by regulation.

The CFA is subdivided into forest districts and units whose number and internal organisation are fixed by ministerial order. Each CFA district typically corresponds territorially to a daïra (administrative district) and to forest districts corresponding to communes.

=== Conservators ===
The head of the CFA is the Conservator of Forests of Algiers (Conservateur des forêts). The Conservator manages human, material and financial resources placed at their disposal and is the secondary authorising officer for credits allocated to the conservation. The Conservator is appointed by executive decree on the minister's proposal.

Conservators of Forests of Algiers
#	Conservator	Start	End
1	Chaâbane Cheriet		18 February 2006
2	Saâdoun Chaïb	1 June 2006	29 December 2011
3	Noureddine Baâziz	29 December 2011	2016 (incumbent at time of source)

=== Technical staff ===
The DGF and the CFA employ several senior technical posts, including:

- Forestry engineers and forest experts
- Radio communications network chiefs
- Forest ranger and brigade chiefs
- Technical forest agents

== Mandate and missions ==
The CFA implements programmes and measures for the development, protection and expansion of forest and alfa patrimony, and for the conservation of land subject to erosion and desertification.

It organises and supervises the exploitation of forest products and other uses of forest land within the framework of forest management plans. It coordinates measures to prevent and fight forest fires that ravage the forests.

The CFA enforces forest legislation and regulation, instructs applications for authorisations provided by forestry law, maintains inventories of forest, alfa and game resources, and implements programmes for development, conservation, education and public awareness.

It gathers relevant information and disseminates it in order to produce periodic reports and evaluations of its activities.

== Activities ==
The CFA's main activities in the Wilaya of Algiers include:

- Compiling seasonal reports on fires and other incidents.
- Maintaining an emergency response system for wildfires.
- Creating forest-related employment.
- Supporting local populations to remain on and manage their lands.
- Enhancing the green cover of the Algiers region.

== Forest patrimony ==
The CFA manages more than 130 forest sites across the Wilaya of Algiers covering several thousand hectares, many of them in peri-urban and urban environments. Planned opening of new forest sites aims at increasing urban green cover and reducing pressure on the larger surrounding forests such as Baïnem, Ben Aknoun, Réghaïa, Sidi Fredj and Zéralda.

== Reforestation ==
The CFA participates in national reforestation programmes (Plan National de Reboisement) and undertakes replanting operations to stabilise soils and limit erosion (for example near the Douéra dam), and along highways and public infrastructure. Annual technical and biological programmes commonly address several hundred hectares to preserve forest environments.

== Facilities and specialised centres ==
=== Réghaïa Game Management Centre ===
The CFA administers the Réghaïa Game Management Centre located within the Réghaïa forest area. Created by decree No. 83-75 (8 January 1983), the centre was later developed to manage the Réghaïa nature reserve and to support wetland conservation under Ramsar objectives. The center's mission is to monitor game production, birdlife, and raise public awareness of the importance of their work..

=== Zéralda Game Management Centre ===
The CFA also operates the Zéralda Game Management Centre (CCZ) in the Zéralda forest, historically initiated in 1968 for game breeding (pheasants and other game species). The centre was legally recognised in 1983 and now focuses on biodiversity, ecosystem management and controlled hunting activities. It has also developed programs for reintroduction and protection of species such as the Barbary stag.

== Bibliography and further reading ==
- FAO. State of Forest Genetic Resources in Algeria, FAO, 2012. "State of Forest Genetic Resources in Algeria" (PDF). Archived from the original (PDF) on 6 July 2022.
- Idir Tazerout, "La forêt algérienne est un gisement vert", L'Expression, 27 October 2013.
- Various press reports and local studies (see references).

== See also ==
- Wilaya of Algiers
- Silviculture
- Forest inventory
