= Ashura in Algeria =

In Algeria, the Islamic festival of Ashura (Arabic: يوم عاشوراء), on 10 Muharram, is a public holiday, traditionally marked by celebration, zakat-giving, fasting, and cemetery visits depending on the region. In some areas the celebration incorporates dances, music, and masquerades.

== Legal status ==
The day of Ashura is one of twelve paid public holidays in Algeria, codified as such by law since 1963 (shortly after independence), and still in force today.

Ashura's status as a public holiday in Algeria contrasts with the situation in some other Muslim countries, such as Saudi Arabia or Indonesia, reflecting this holiday's traditional importance in Algerian culture.

== Date ==
The festival of Ashura, like other Islamic holidays, is celebrated according to the Islamic calendar, which uses a lunar year eleven days shorter than the solar year. Its date in the Gregorian calendar, which is solar, therefore varies from year to year.

== Religious aspects ==
Among the Sunni majority of Algeria, following Sunni tradition, Ashura is considered as the anniversary of many blessed events in sacred history, such as the saving of Moses and his people from Pharaoh, the saving of Noah and his family from the Flood, the repentance of Adam, etc. Popular tradition in many regions thus treats it as an occasion for celebration and happiness, contrasting with Shia tradition, in which Ashura is an occasion for mourning. This is, however, controversial within Sunni Islam, in Algeria and more broadly; Salafis, for instance, often cite Ibn Taymiyyah, who condemned the celebration of Ashura with special dishes, kohl, henna, etc. in his own time as a religious innovation overreacting against Shia practice.

While Islam does not require zakat to be paid on a particular day, it is customary in Algeria to pay it on Ashura. This practice is sometimes accompanied by material donations to the poor or by discount sales.

Sufi brotherhoods and zawiyas often organize special events for Ashura, including dhikr. These may include tomb visits; for instance, in Bouzeguene, women traditionally visit a marabout's mausoleum on Ashura, while near Timimoun, Ashura is the occasion for an annual visit (ziyara) to the tomb of a local saint, Sidi El Cherif.

== Celebration ==
At sunset, the Ashura fast is typically broken with a feast. In Algiers, chicken is preferred, raising its price considerably in the run-up to Ashura; in the Ouarsenis, rougag with chicken; in the M'zab, a bean dish (ibawen); in Bouzeguene, couscous with mutton saved from Eid al-Adha; in Sidi Bel Abbès, trid. In other places, popular choices include dolma, ghoriba, refiss, or baghrir. This dinner feast may also be used as the occasion to gather together zakat payments in kind, as at Laghouat.

In Tlemcen, women and children traditionally decorate themselves with henna for the occasion.

In many regions, the celebration also takes on overtly carnivalesque aspects, some of which have been claimed to be relics of pre-Islamic practices such as Saturnalia. In some parts of Kabylie, Ashura was traditionally marked by masquerades, where people put on sharp-toothed masks or dressed up as donkeys or slaves. In Ouargla and Gourara, the associated celebration is called "Biyanou", and children go trick-or-treating that day asking for snacks and sweets. In the M'zab region in the south, children put on kohl and likewise go trick-or-treating from house to house, singing "Aba nouh" and asking for sweets. In southeastern Algeria among the Tuareg, Ashura is traditionally marked by the Sebiba festival, featuring dancing and music.

== Charity ==
The tradition of giving zakat to the poor and holding collective feasts at Ashura contributes to the holiday's role in Algeria as an occasion for solidarity and social assistance.

In many Algerian cities, such as Tlemcen, Ashura is the occasion for discount sales, starting from the first day of the month of Muharram, and attracting crowds. The urban cities are transformed during this day, in a gigantic market where all kinds of products are exposed, in particular articles that have been in stock too long.

The poorest who have received their share of Zakat take advantage of this windfall to do their shopping.

== Newborns ==
An Algerian child born on or around Ashura was traditionally often given the first name Achour in honour of the occasion.

Many parents prefer to reserve infants' first haircut for the day of Ashura.

== See also ==
- Sufism in Algeria
- Mawlid in Algeria
- Mawsim
- Tweeza
