= Mawlid (disambiguation) =

Mawlid is the birth of the Islamic prophet Muhammad.

Mawlid may also refer to:

- Mawlid al-Barzanjī, a panegyric of the Islamic prophet Muhammad
- Mawlid Hayir, a Somali politician
- Mawlid in Algeria, a celebration of Muhammad's birth in Algeria

== See also ==
- Milad (disambiguation)
- Mouloud (disambiguation)
- Mouloudia (disambiguation)
