= Mawlid in Algeria =

In Algeria, the Day of Mawlid (Arabic: يوم المولد النبوي; meaning the Birth of Muhammad) has been traditionally a day of celebration and joy, because Mawlid is celebrated on the twelfth day of Rabiʽ al-Awwal across the Muslim world. Algerian people, however, embrace this day with cheerful remembrance of those who have died, and it is a custom to pay visit to cemetery in order to pray for the departed ones.

== Public holiday ==
The celebration of Mawlid Day in Algeria is part of the feasts and public holidays which are the set of religious and civil holidays which are legally defined by law.

Indeed, the independent Algerian state has codified a count of twelve public holidays (religious and civil holidays) legally defined by the Algerian constitution.

These public holidays, including Mawlid, were included in Law No. 63/278 of 26 July 1963, amended and supplemented by Ordinances No. 66/153 and No. 68/1491.

The fact that in Algeria the day of Mawlid is considered a public holiday shows the importance of this holiday for Algerians, because not all Muslim countries grant a public holiday for this holiday.

== Celebration day ==
The feast of Mawlid, like other Muslim festivals, is celebrated according to the Hijri calendar which differs from year to year, according to a sliding mode of eleven days, and therefore according to the local phenomena of the different lunar phases, hence dates which vary from year to year.

== Tradition and Customs ==
Algerians see the Mawlid as a prophetic tradition and a cultural custom, hence the fact that Mawlid day has different meanings for families and individuals.

Since this celebration is commemorated on the twelfth day of the month of Rabiʽ al-Awwal, which is the third month of the Hijri year, Algerians experience this joy according to the tradition of Sunni Islam which has marked for centuries the history of Algeria and that of the Maghreb.

This is how Mawlid is celebrated differently and in many ways by the festivity and the pious commemoration, where each citizen marks this sacred day in his own way.

At the arrival of the Mawlid festivity, Algerian evenings are brightened up in homes by halqas of dhikr, dua and nasheed where all the members of the family meet, to the tunes of drums and darbouka, while raising hands in Dua.

== Gastronomy ==
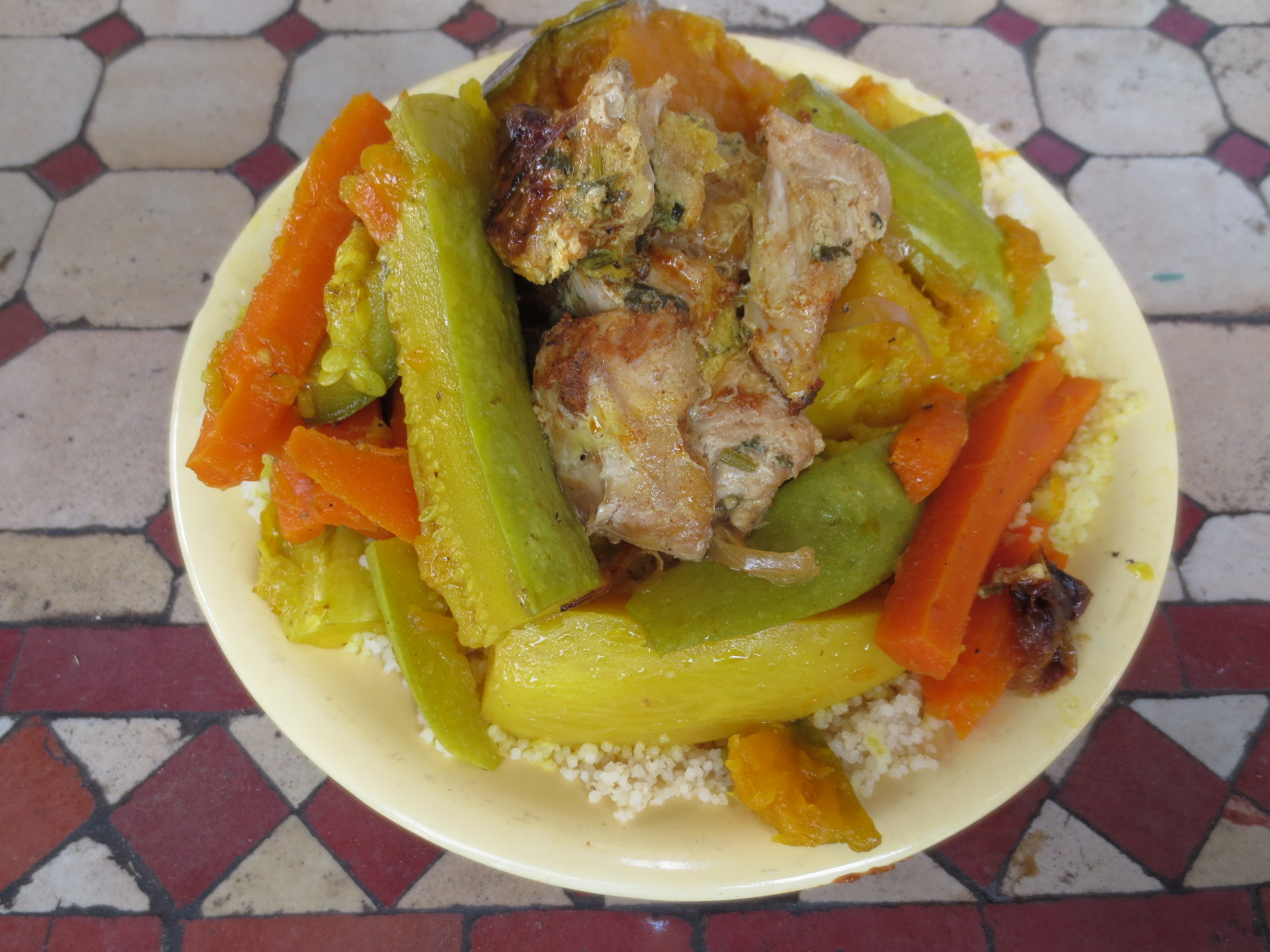
Couscous

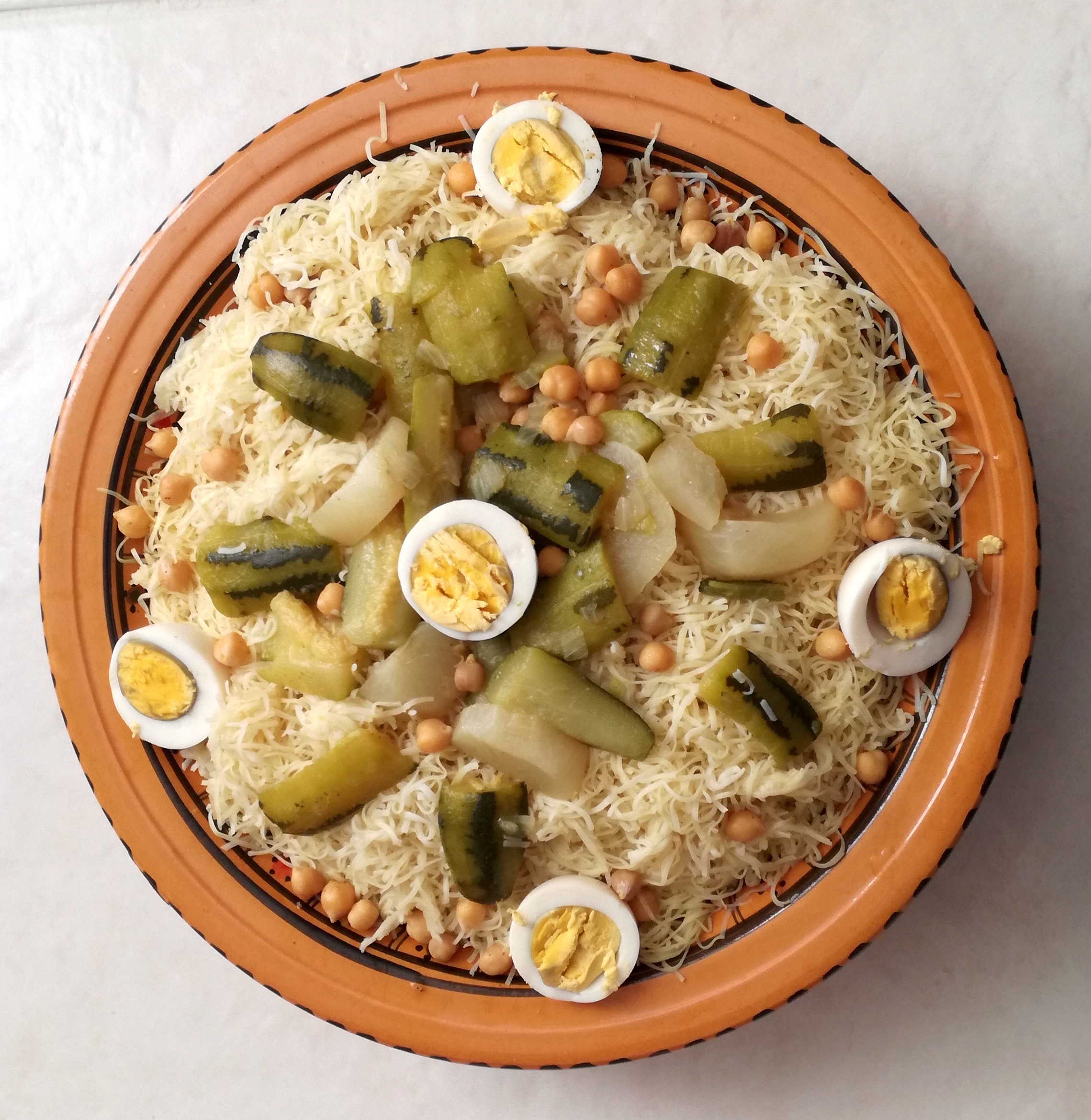
Rechta

The celebration of the feast of Mawlid is also distinguished by the culinary aspect specific to each geographical region of Algeria.

This is how housewives prepare favorite traditional dishes, such as couscous, Rechta, chakhchoukha, dolma, ghoriba, refiss, bagherirs and other succulent and tantalizing dishes, and to concoct delicious traditional dishes to present to tasters.

The couscous dish, classified as Maghreb intangible cultural heritage, is presented on the occasion of the Mawlid.

To ensure the success of the gastronomic services of the housewives, a system of permanence is ensured by the traders of fruit and vegetables as well as other basic products and essential to satisfy the demand of households.

But a fraudulent practice is noted in this circumstance by the soaring prices of the products necessary for the preparation of the dishes for this festivity, and more particularly the prices of chicken on the eve of Mawlid.

This situation is denounced to each Mawlid as a serious commercial overrun having no logical explanations for this phenomenon which precedes each national or religious holiday, and caused by speculators.

This increase greatly influences consumer behavior on this religious holiday, despite the availability and normal and regular supply of various consumer products at expensive prices.

The celebration is accompanied by a set of customs and traditions, including the famous preparation of a couscous dish with chicken, chickpeas and Trida, and the Tamina and Sellou cake.

These dishes and sweets are presented with tea or coffee and are prepared with semolina and honey, some with flour, peanuts, spices and others.

== Vestimentation ==
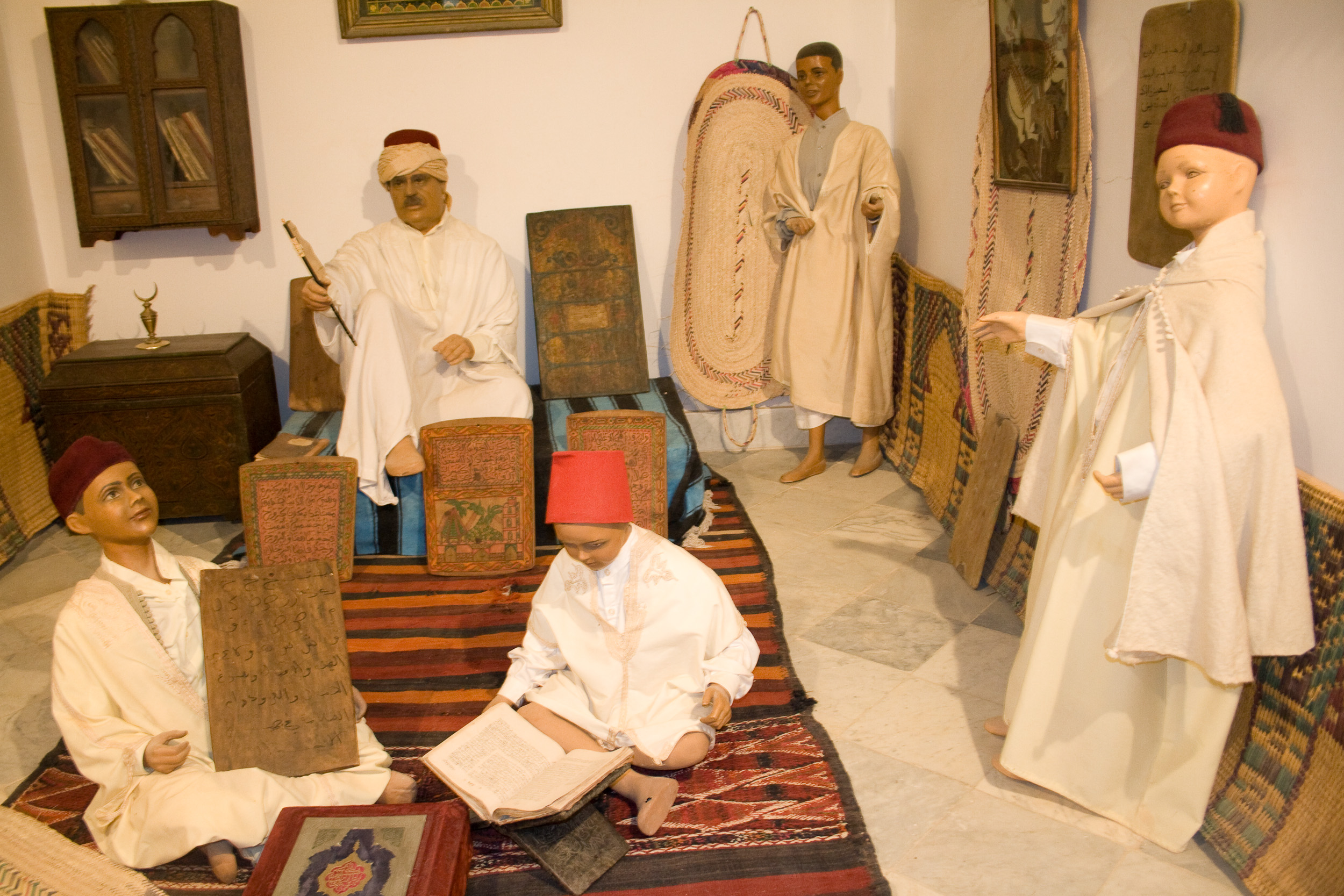
Traditional clothing in Algeria.

The Mawlid ceremonial is accompanied by traditional clothing worn by adults and particularly by children to mark the joviality and happiness inherent in the circumstance.

Families in ancestral outfits delight photography laboratories for more than a week in a particular craze for taking pictures of children dressed in these authentic clothes.

This clothing and photographic custom is inherited by the inhabitants and aims to inculcate in the younger generations the culture of heritage preservation and traditions in such a religious holiday and to make them know the importance of celebrating Mawlid in the company of their children.

On the eve of Mawlid, the girls wear traditional clothes including the Chedda, the Mensoudj and the Karakou, while the boys wear the Seroual Medaouer (pants) with a shirt embroidered with Fetla, the Balgha (babouche) and capped with Chechia.

Among Algerian families are those who opt for sewing traditional children's clothing, while others resort to hiring them from specialized traditional clothing stores.

Draped in their beautiful stylish clothes, Algerians flock at each celebration of the Mawlid to the photography laboratories which are thus stormed to memorize these moments on souvenir photos.

It is particularly the working-class neighborhoods that stand out for the presentation and offer of many traditional children's clothes for low and affordable prices, such as Blusa and other clothes of different colors, as well as various silver and copper jewelry used for embellishment of girls, including bracelets, rings and necklaces, or children's shoes embroidered with gold threads and others.

== Engagement and births ==
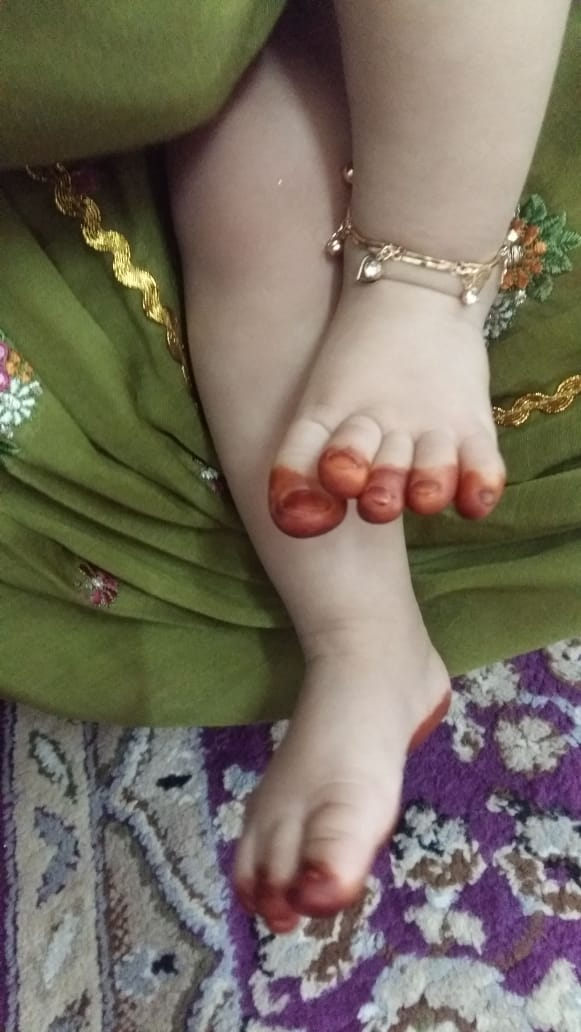
Henna on feet.

Algerian consider Mawlid a blessing day for the newborn male with many ancestral rites, including calling him with the first name Mouloud.

The days of Mawlid are also days of blessing for the engagement of future couples who make this event coincide with the date of Mawlid.

== Sbooa ==
In the Algerian Sahara, the Sbooa ceremony is a Muslim religious pilgrimage which takes place during seven consecutive days on the day of Mawlid.

Thus the Sbooe is a religious festival in the form of a pilgrimage to the mausoleums of the marabouts of the Saharan regions to celebrate the birth of Muhammad.

Many inhabitants in the Saharan region of Gourara gather annually in Timimoun or in the various ksars, which are fortified villages, to celebrate the Mawlid.

For seven days a protocol, that the oral tradition dates from the action of Sidi El Hadj Belkacem (died in 1627), the founder of the Zawiya where the pilgrims and murids end their journey.

== See also ==
- Ashewiq
- Blusa
- Halqa
- Karakou
- Mawsim
- Rechta
- Sbooa
- Sebiba
- tamina
- Tasu'a
- Trida
- Tweeza
