= Public holidays in Algeria =

This is a list of holidays in Algeria.

== Civil public holidays ==
National holidays include Independence Day on July 5, commemorating Algerian independence from French colonial rule since 1962.

Date	English name
January 1	New Year's Day
January 12	Amazigh New Year
May 1	Labour Day
July 5	Independence Day
November 1	Revolution Day

== Islamic public holidays ==
The following holidays are public holidays but the date on which each occurs varies, according to Islamic calendar, and thus has no set date in the Gregorian calendar. They are listed below in the order in which they occur in Islamic calendar:

English name	Description
Islamic New Year	The 1st day of the month of Muharram
Ashura	The 10th day of the month of Muharram
Mawlid	The Birth of Muhammad
Eid al-Fitr	The end of Ramadan
Eid al-Adha	Sacrifice Feast

== See also ==
- Ashura in Algeria
- Mawlid in Algeria
