= Milad =

Milad may refer to:

- Milad (given name)
- Milad Hospital, hospital in Iran
- Milad Rizk (fl. 2010–2015), a Lebanese actor
- Milad Tower, tallest tower in Iran
- Mawlid, the observance of the birthday of the Islamic prophet Muhammad

== See also ==
- Mawlid (disambiguation)
