= Trida =

Traditional Algerian dish

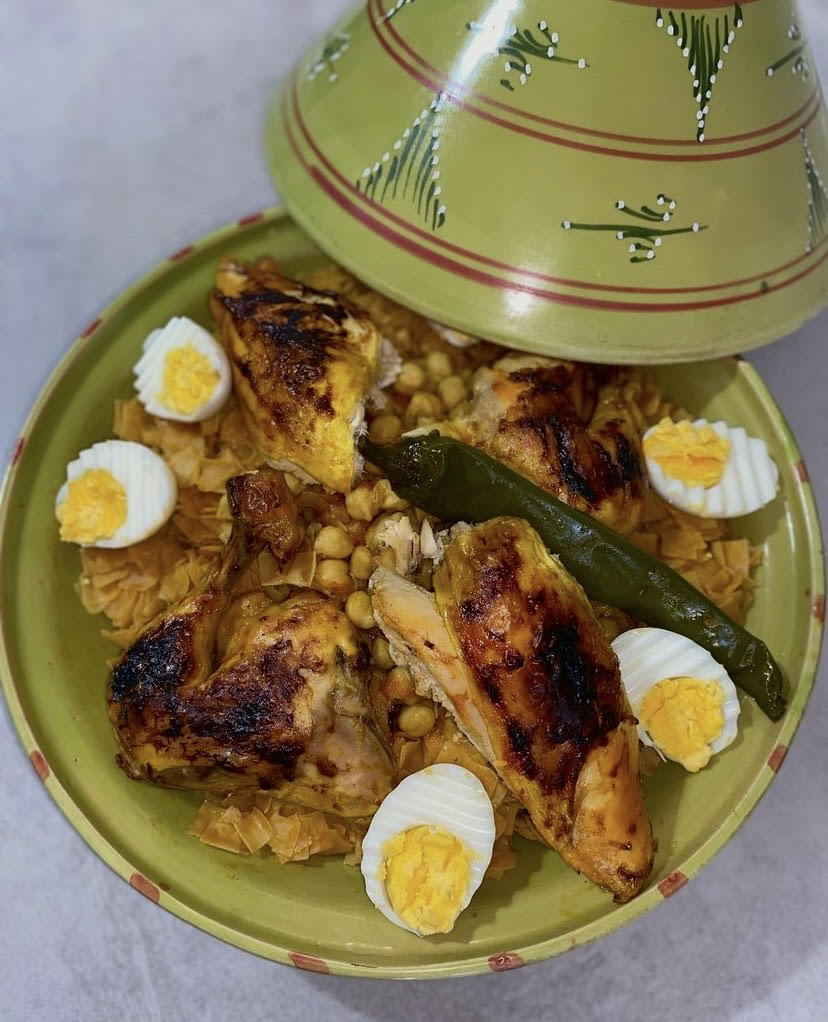
Algerian trida

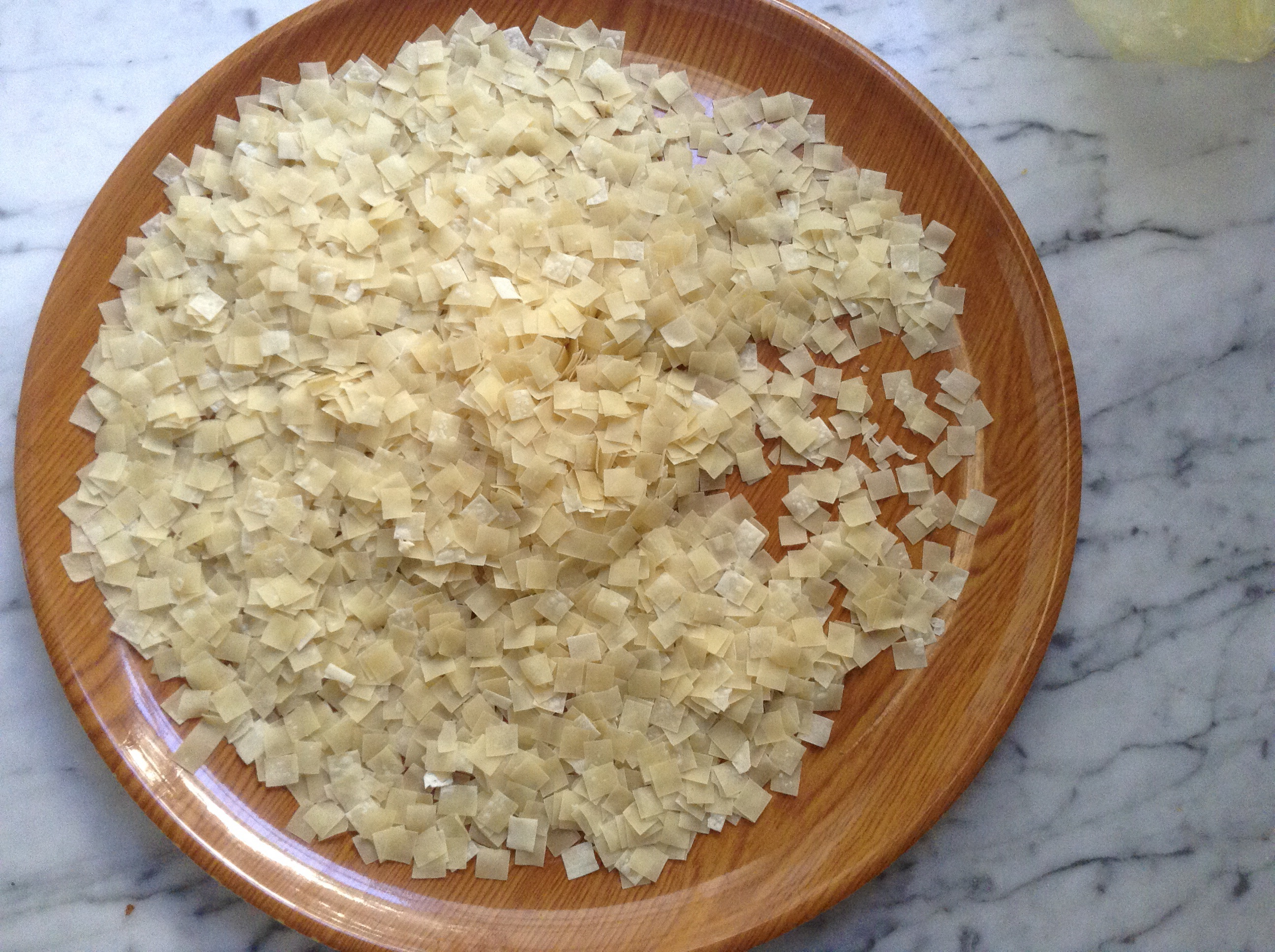
Trida before cooking

Trida (Arabic: تريدة), also known as mkafta, is a traditional Algerian dish made with handcrafted square-shaped pasta, chicken, meatballs, chickpeas, and hard-boiled eggs, all served with a white sauce or red sauce with tomatoes. This dish is often served during Yennayer, the Berber New Year.

== Origin ==
Tharid, originating from Mesopotamia, which refers to thin flatbreads, has evolved into pasta dishes while retaining the name "trida" or alternatively "mqettefa" or "mqartfa" in Algeria depending on regional variations. When using Algerian flatbread ("kesra") to break it into small pieces and dip them in the sauce, it is called "tridat adhfar" (trida of the fingernail, a figurative expression referring to the size of the bread pieces) or what the Baghdadi people called "fatit" (crumbs).
