= Independence Day (Algeria) =

National holiday commemorating Algerian independence from France (5 July 1962)

Independence Day of Algeria
- Observed by: Algeria
- Type: National
- Celebrations: Flag Hoisting, Parades, Singing Patriotic Songs and the national anthem, Speech by the President of Algeria.
- Date: July 5
- Next time: July 5, 2027
- Frequency: Annual

Independence Day (Arabic: عيد الاستقلال, romanized: ʿīd al-istiqlāli, French: Jour de l'Indépendance), observed annually on 5 July, is a National Holiday in Algeria commemorating colonial Algerian independence from France on 5 July 1962.

== Algerian War (1954–1962) ==
The Algerian War of Independence began in November 1954 and ended in 1962. The war was long and brutal, and was a major turning point in Algeria's history. Although it was often a fratricidal conflict, it ultimately united Algerians and brought the value of independence and the philosophy of anticolonialism into the national consciousness. The abusive tactics of the French Army remain a controversial subject in France to this day. In the early morning hours (12:00 am) of 1 November 1954, the National Liberation Army (L'armée de Libération Nationale, ALN—the military wing of the National Liberation Front) launched attacks throughout Algeria in the opening salvo of a war of independence. An important turning point in the war was the massacre of civilians by the National Liberation Front (Front de libération nationale, FLN) near the town of Philippeville in August 1955. The French government claimed to have killed 1,273 guerrillas during its retaliation; however, according to the FLN, 12,000 Muslims were killed by the armed forces and police, as well as colon gangs. After the events in Philippeville, all-out war began in Algeria. The FLN fought largely using guerrilla and terrorist tactics, while the French counter-insurgency tactics often included severe reprisals and repression.

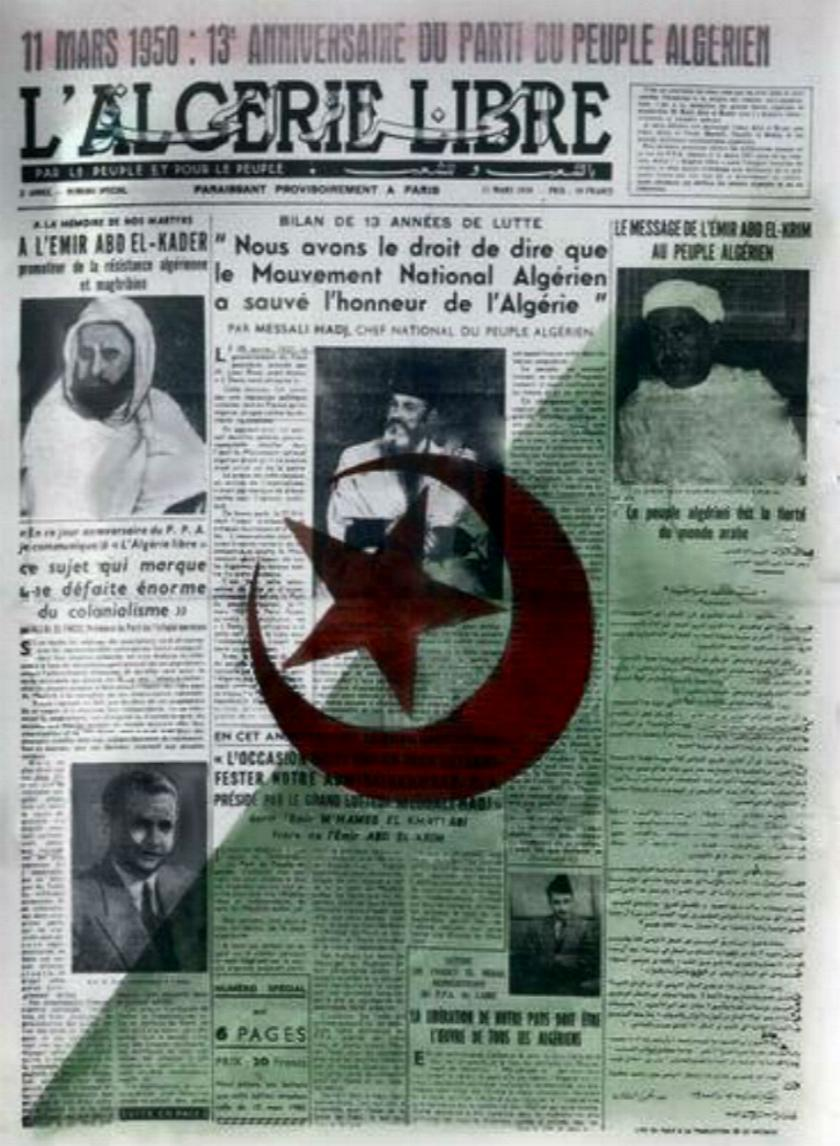
Front page of Free Algeria in 1950 for the celebration of the 13th anniversary of the Algerian People's Party.

Eventually, protracted negotiations led to a cease-fire signed by France and the FLN on 18 March 1962 in Evian, France. The Évian accords also provided for continuing economic, financial, technical, and cultural relations, along with interim administrative arrangements until a referendum on self-determination could be held. The Evian accords guaranteed the religious and property rights of French settlers, but the perception that they would not be respected led to the exodus of one million Pieds-Noirs (French people born in Algeria) and Harki (Muslim Algerians who fought alongside the French army).

Between 350,000 and 1 million Algerians are estimated to have died during the war, and more than 2 million (out of a total Muslim population of 9 or 10 million) were made into refugees or forcibly relocated into government-controlled camps. Much of the countryside and agriculture was devastated, along with the modern economy, which had been dominated by urban European settlers (the pied-noirs). French sources estimated that at least 70,000 Muslim civilians were killed or abducted and presumed killed by the FLN during the Algerian War. Nearly one million people of mostly French, Spanish and Italian descent were forced to flee Algeria after it gained independence, due to the threats from units of the victorious FLN. Most Algerians of Jewish descent and Muslim Algerians who had supported a French Algeria (the Harkis) fled with them. 30,000–150,000 pro-French Muslims were killed in Algeria by FLN in post-war reprisals.

French President Charles De Gaulle pronounced Algeria an independent country on 3 July 1962. The decision was published in the official journal the following day, and Algerian leaders declared 5 July, the anniversary of the French arrival in Algiers, to be Independence Day.

== See also ==
- Public holidays in Algeria
- Proposed partition of Algeria
