= Tunisian tagine =

Baked egg dish with meat and cheese

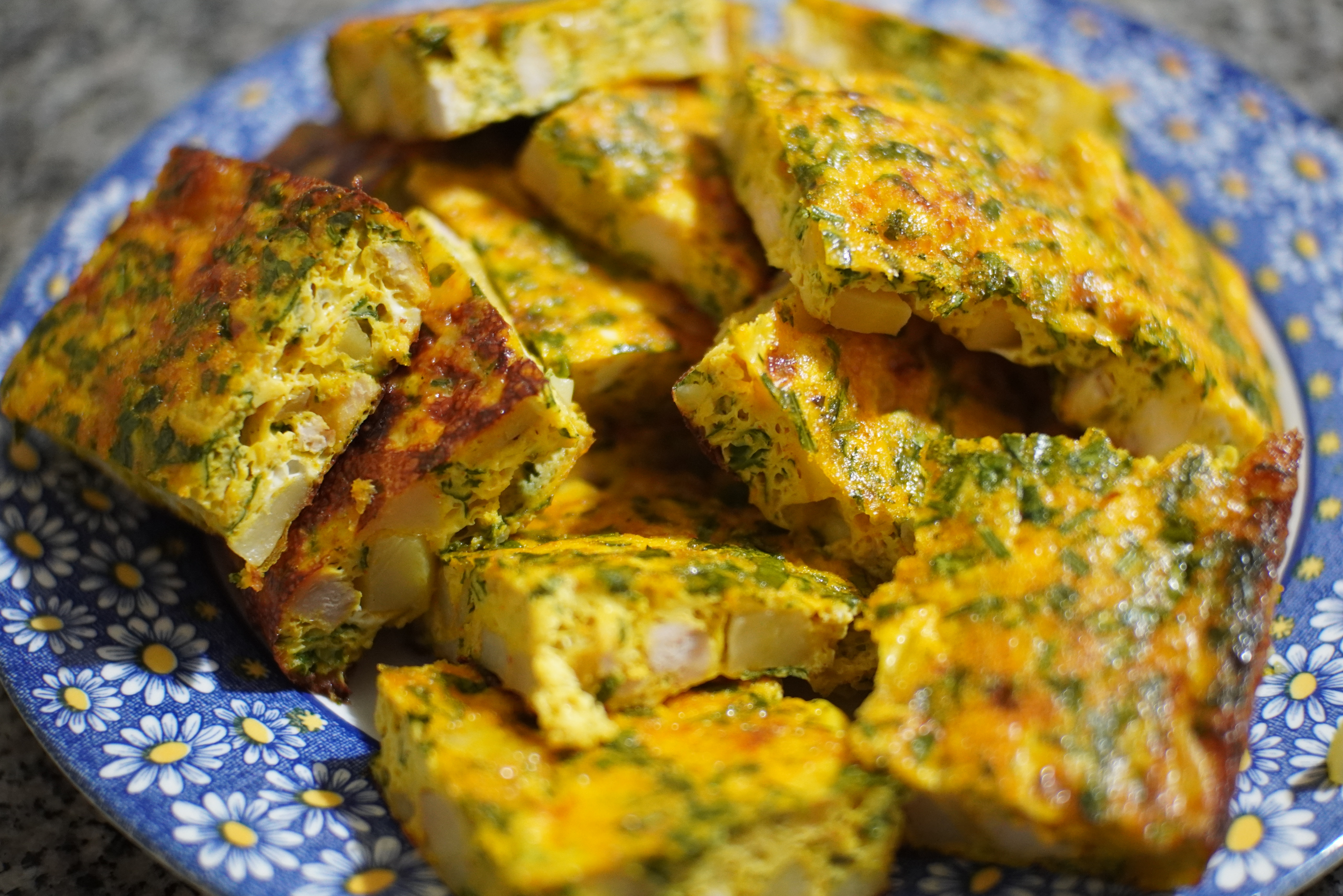
- Region or state: Tunisia

In Tunisian cuisine, tagine is a baked egg dish with meat and cheese. The food writer Paula Wolfert compares it to the Italian frittata. Like the stew-based tagine, the name for the food derives from the earthenware dish used to cook it, also called a tagine, with its etymological roots in the ancient Greek τάγηνον for "frying pan".

A tagine malsouka wraps the tagine in sheets of malsouka pastry, for a dish that Wolfert compares to a French quiche.

== Origin ==
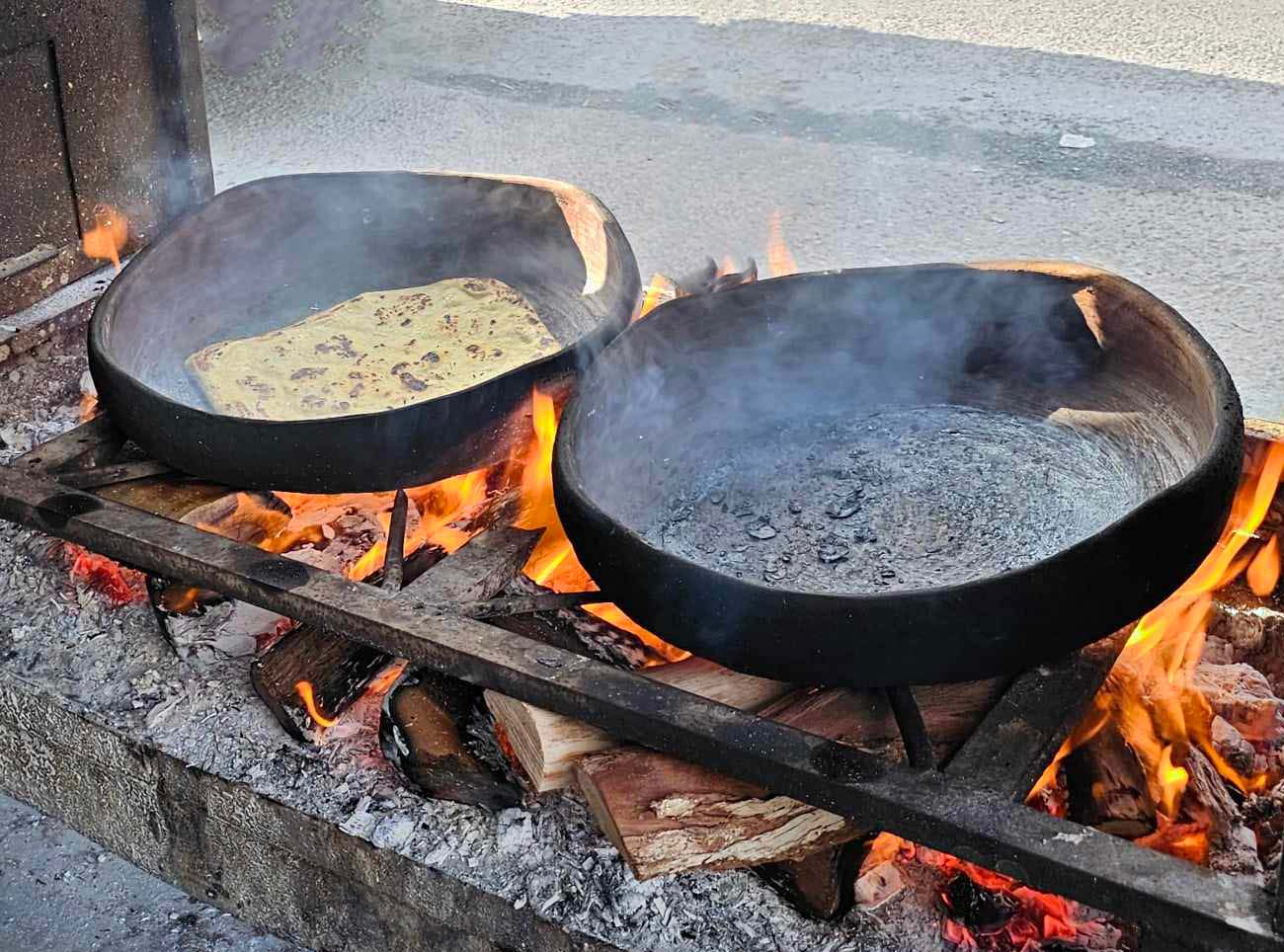
Tunisian tagine skillets, cooking khobz al-tajin

The Arabic طاجين (ṭajīn) is derived from Ancient Greek τάγηνον (tágēnon) 'frying-pan'. The Mediterannean tágēnon was a shallow, flat-bottomed skillet made of clay. A variety of earthenware cooking vessels in North Africa derive their names from this Greek origin, including the Moroccan stews tangia and tagine. The Tunisian cooking vessel is traditionally round, small, and is either covered with hot coals or baked to cook the food inside.

== Recipe ==
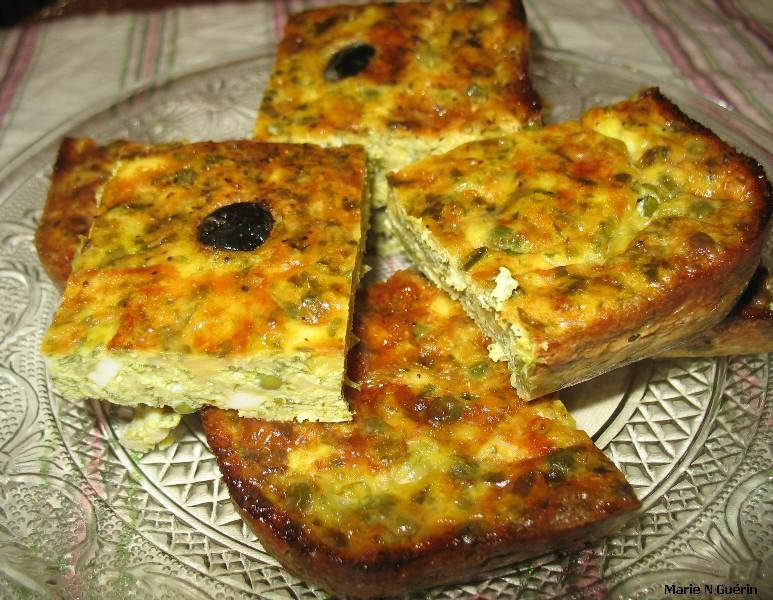
Tunisian tajine

First, a simple ragout is prepared, of meat cut into very small pieces, cooked with onions and spices, such as a blend of dried rose flower buds and ground cinnamon known as baharat or a robust combination of ground coriander and caraway seeds; this is called tabil. Then a starch such as cannellini beans, chickpeas, breadcrumbs or cubed potatoes, is added to thicken the juices. When the meat is tender, flavorful ingredients are added. These might include parsley, mint, saffron, sun-dried tomatoes, cooked vegetables, or stewed calves' brains. Next, the stew is enriched with cheese and eggs. Finally, this egg and stew are baked in a tagine (or a pie dish) until the eggs are set. To serve, the tagine is turned out onto a plate and sliced into squares.
