= Mouloudia =

Mouloudia may refer to:

- MC El Eulma (Mouloudia Chabab El Eulma), Algeria
- MC Alger (Mouloudia Club d'Alger), Algeria
- MC El Bayadh (Mouloudia Club El Bayadh), Algeria
- MC Oran (Mouloudia Club of Oran), Algeria
- MC Oujda (Mouloudia Club of Oujda), Morocco
- MC Saïda (Mouloudia Club of Saïda), Algeria
- MO Béjaïa (Mouloudia Olympique Béjaïa), Algeria
- MO Constantine (Mouloudia Olympique Constantine), Algeria
- MSP Batna (Mouloudia Sportive Populaire de Batna), Algeria

== See also ==
- Mawlid (disambiguation)
- Mouloud (disambiguation)
