= Milad (given name) =

- Gender: Male
- Language: Persian, Arabic

Origin
- Word/name: Persian (from Arabic)
- Meaning: Birth

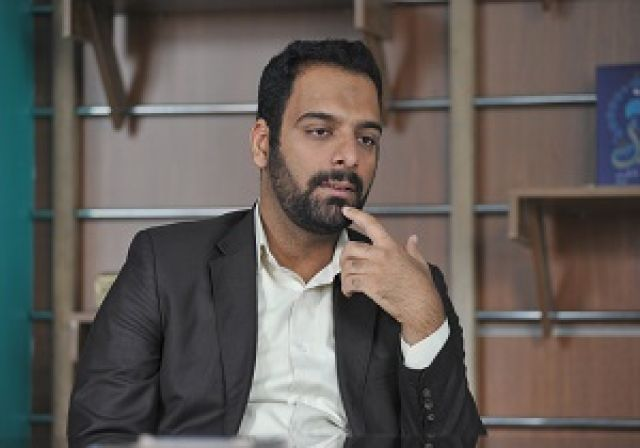
Iranian Poet Milad Erfanpour in 2020

Etymology and Origin The given name Milad (Persian: میلاد) is a masculine name commonly used in Persian-speaking communities. It derives from the Arabic noun mīlād (ميلاد), meaning "birth" or "nativity," which stems from the Semitic root w-l-d ("to give birth" or "to bear"). This root is shared across Arabic, Aramaic/Syriac, and related languages. The term entered Persian as a loanword, likely during the Sasanian period (224–651 CE) through cultural and religious exchanges, particularly via Nestorian Christian communities in Persia who used similar Syriac terms for Christ's birth (Milad al-Masih, or "Nativity of the Messiah").

In Persian usage, the name has historically been associated with the Christian concept of the Nativity rather than Islamic celebrations like Mawlid al-Nabi (Muhammad's birthday), though modern contexts sometimes overlap due to broader Arabic influence. The word also correlates with Persian cultural terms like Shab-e Yalda ("Yalda Night"), where Yalda (from Syriac yalda, "birth") refers to the winter solstice as the "birth" of the sun, showing shared themes of renewal and light that predate the loanword but align conceptually. Abu Rayhan al-Biruni referred to Yalda as "Milad-e Akbar" (the great birth, i.e., of the sun).

The name appears in Ferdowsi's Shahnameh (completed c. 1010 CE) as Milad, the father of the champion Gurgin (Gorgin) Milad, a warrior in the service of kings like Kay Kavus and Kay Khosrow. This places Milad within Persian epic tradition, reflecting semi-legendary pre-Islamic Iranian lineages (possibly linked to noble houses like the Parthian Mihran family in medieval sources such as Tabari). However, this occurrence does not indicate an indigenous Old Persian etymology for the name itself; the Shahnameh draws on ancient oral lore but was composed in the Islamic era.

Some folk etymologies and secondary sources suggest a conceptual link to ancient Persian theophoric names like Mithradates (Old Persian Miθradāta, "given by Mithra"), the name of several historical kings (e.g., Parthian rulers) and modern Persian Mehrdad ("gift of Mithra"). While not a direct linguistic derivation (due to differing roots: Semitic w-l-d vs. Iranian dāta from "to give"), the shared solar and "divine gift/birth" themes—especially given Mithraic influences on early Christian nativity symbolism (e.g., December 25 as the birth of the unconquered sun)—offer a plausible cultural resonance in Persian naming traditions. This connection remains interpretive rather than etymological.

In summary, Milad is best classified as a Persian name of ultimately Arabic/Semitic origin (via loanword adoption), with strong ties to Christian nativity contexts in historical Persian usage, alongside appearances in epic literature and potential conceptual echoes of pre-Islamic Zoroastrian/Mithraic motifs.

Notable people and characters with the name include:

== Given name ==
- Milad, an Iranian hero in Shahnameh
- Milad Ebadipour (born 1993), Iranian volleyball player
- Milad Fakhreddini (born 1990), Iranian footballer
- Milad Soleiman Fallah (born 1986), Iranian footballer
- Milad Farahani (born 1988), Iranian footballer
- Milad Gharibi (born 1992), Iranian footballer
- Milad Meydavoudi (born 1985), Iranian footballer
- Milad Mohammadi (born 1993), Iranian footballer
- Milad Nouri (footballer, born 1986) (born 1986), Iranian footballer
- Milad Nouri (footballer, born 1993) (born 1993), Iranian footballer
- Milad Omranloo (born 1977), Iranian conductor
- Milad Rizk (born 1972), Lebanese actor
- Milad Salem (born 1988), Afghan footballer
- Milad Zeneyedpour (born 1986), Iranian footballer
