= Tagine =

Maghrebi stew

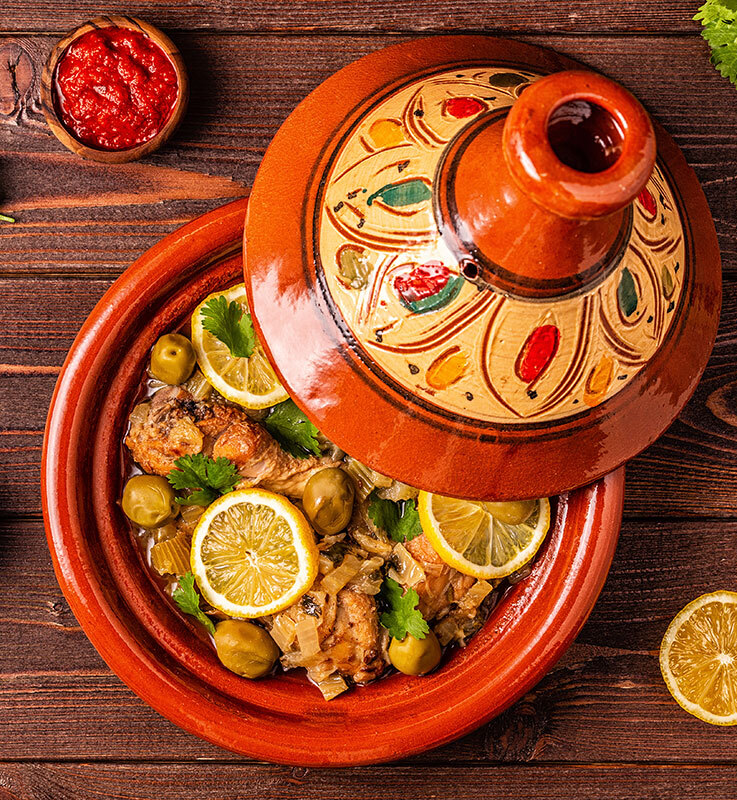
- Moroccan tagine
- Alternative names: طاجين; Tajine, tagin, tajin
- Type: Stew / casserole
- Place of origin: Maghreb
- Associated cuisine: Maghrebi cuisine; Sephardic Jewish cuisine
- Variations: Tunisian tagine

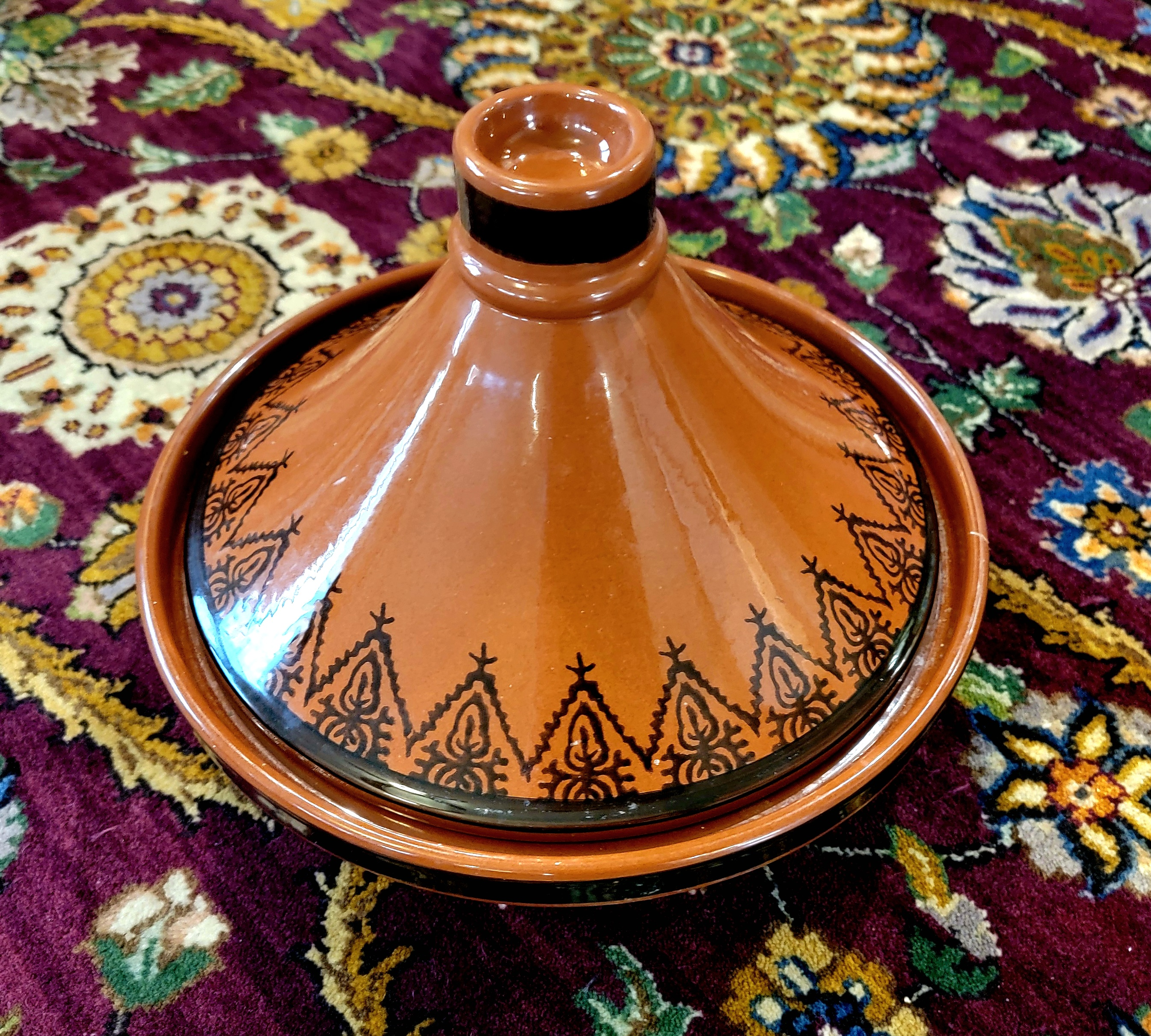
A Portuguese-made tagine pot

A tagine or tajine, also tajin or tagin (Arabic: طاجين, romanized: ṭajīn) is a Maghrebi cuisine stew, named for the earthenware pot in which it is cooked. The pot consists of two parts: a shallow, circular clay skillet and a tall cone- or dome-shaped cover. This cover captures and returns condensation during cooking, so the ingredients are braised with minimal water. The stew typically combines spiced meat, poultry or fish with vegetables or fruit. Tagine recipes include tajine zitoun, tajine mtewem, and tajine lham-lahlou.

== Origin ==
The Arabic طاجين (ṭajīn) is derived from Ancient Greek τάγηνον (tágēnon) 'frying-pan'. The Mediterannean tágēnon was a shallow, flat-bottomed skillet made of clay. A variety of earthenware cooking vessels in North Africa derive their names from this Greek origin, including the tangia from Marrakesh, Morocco and the lidless Tunisian tagine. The tagine cooking vessel with a distinctive cone-shaped lid originated in Tafraout, Morocco. Tajine is also called maraq or marqa.

== Pottery and cooking technique ==
The traditional tagine pottery is earthenware, sometimes painted or glazed, and consists of two parts: a circular base unit that is flat with low sides and a large cone- or dome-shaped cover that sits on the base during cooking. The dish can be served in its tagine, with the cover removed just before eating. Many ceramic tagines are decorative items as well as functional cooking vessels. Some tagines, however, are intended only to be used as decorative serving dishes, and cannot withstand cooking heat.

The cover is designed to return condensation to the bottom. Some liquid is also gradually absorbed by the unglazed ceramic interior. Because the domed or cone-shaped lid of the tagine pot traps steam and returns the condensed liquid to the pot, a minimal amount of water is needed to cook meats and vegetables. This method of cooking is important in areas where water supplies are limited or where public water is not yet available. After most of the liquid is either evaporated or reabsorbed by the food, the hot ceramic tagine serves as a oven to bake it. The food author Paula Wolfert describes tagine cooking as a "magical process" which braises, steams, and bakes ingredients in one vessel.

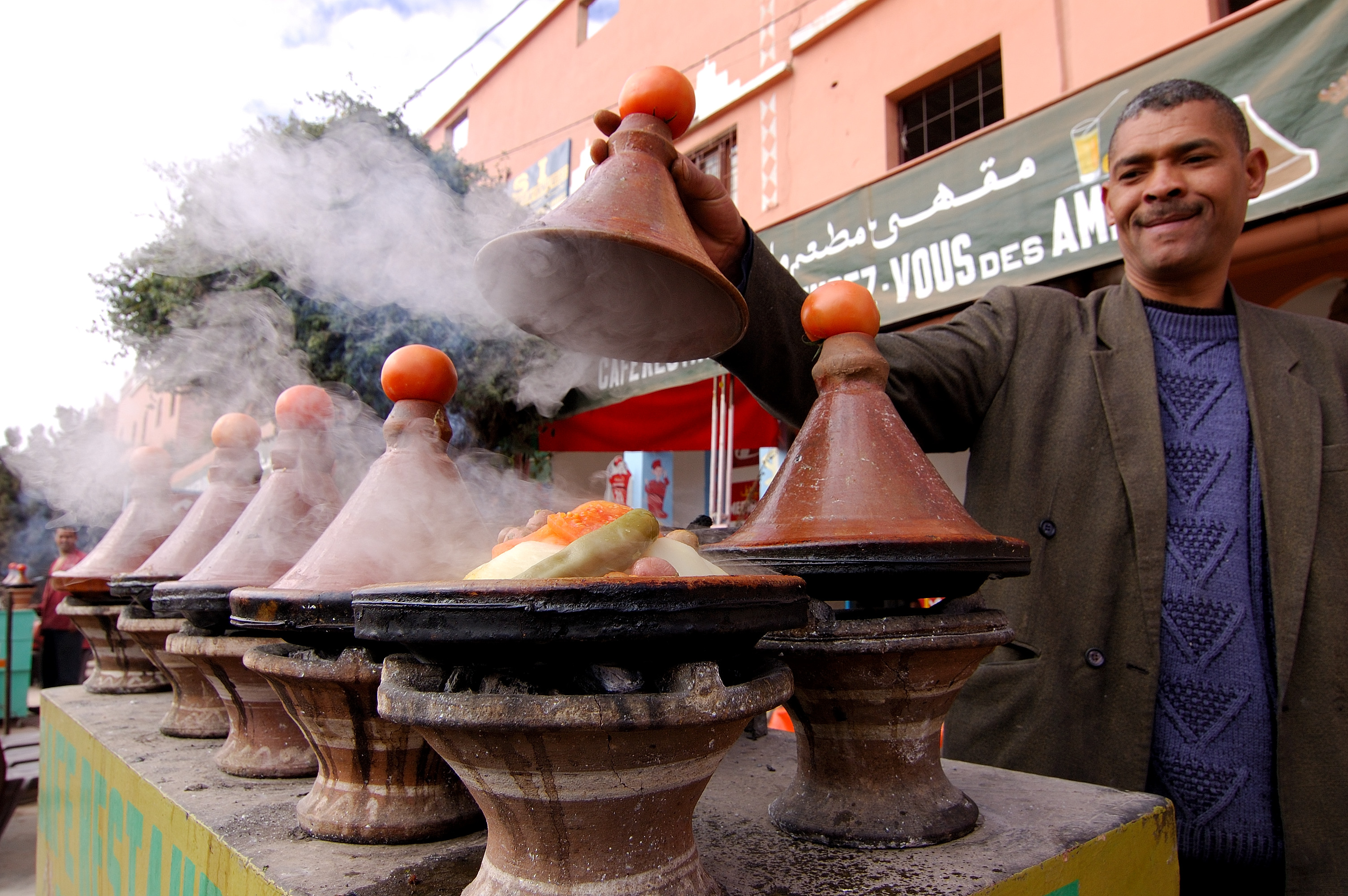
Tagine cooking on clay braziers

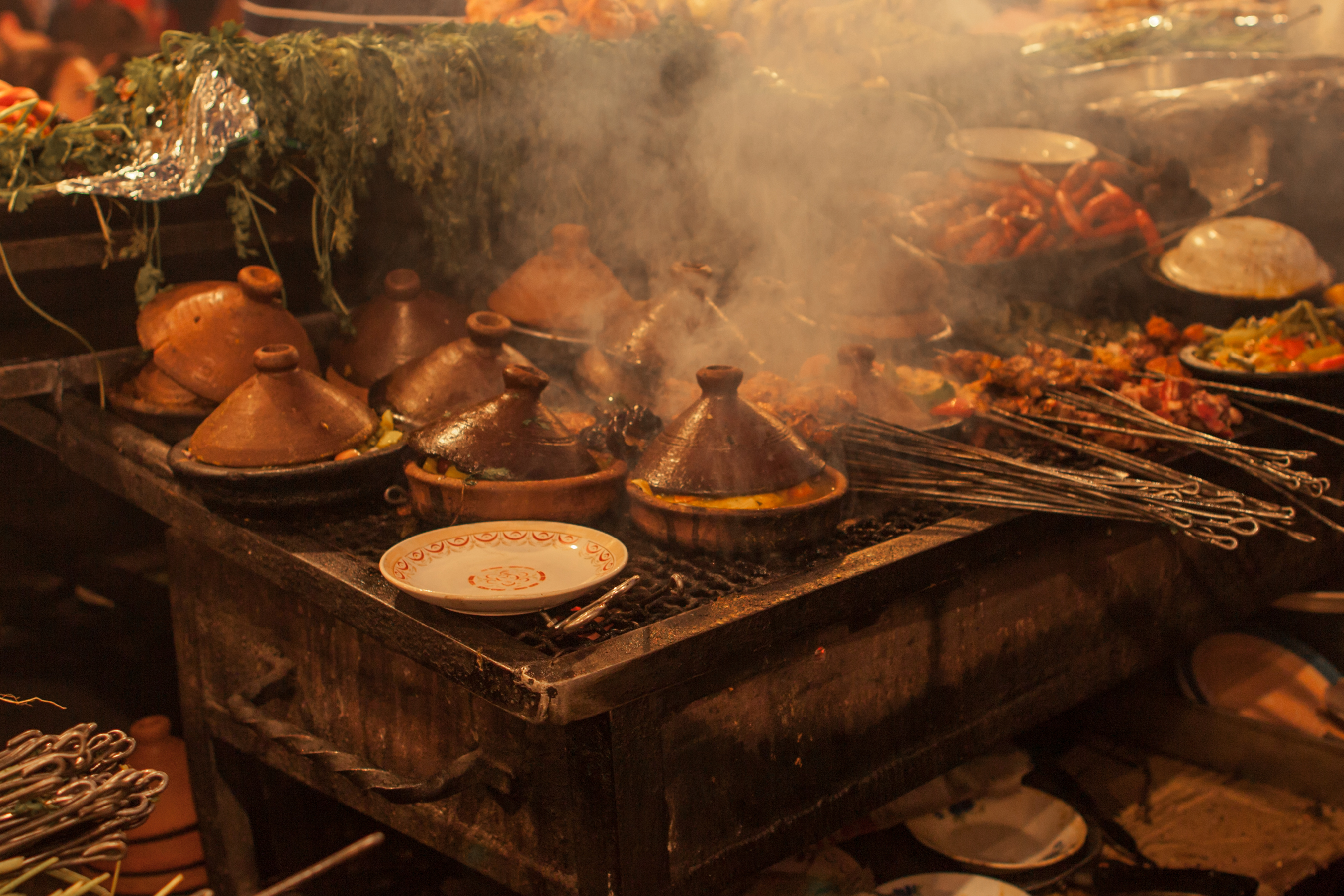
Stovetop cooking of tajine

Tagine is traditionally cooked over hot charcoal using a clay brazier, known as a kanun or majmar, which holds coals and the tagine pot above them. Modern methods can use a tagine in a slow oven or on a gas or electric stove top, on the lowest heat necessary to keep the stew simmering gently. A diffuser, a circular utensil placed between the tagine and the flame, is used to evenly distribute the stove's heat. A sudden change in temperature can crack and ruin a tagine pot. Modern tagines include some flameproof stoneware tagines, sometimes known as "flameware" ceramic, which can be used on direct heat. European manufacturers have also created tagines with heavy cast-iron bottoms that can be heated on a stove to a high temperature.

For some tagine dishes, the food is given a charred top just before serving. Traditionally, this was accomplished by replacing the conical lid with a flat clay dish filled with hot coals, a technique known as "cooking between two fires". In modern cooking, it can be accomplished by finishing the food in a broiler.

== Recipe ==
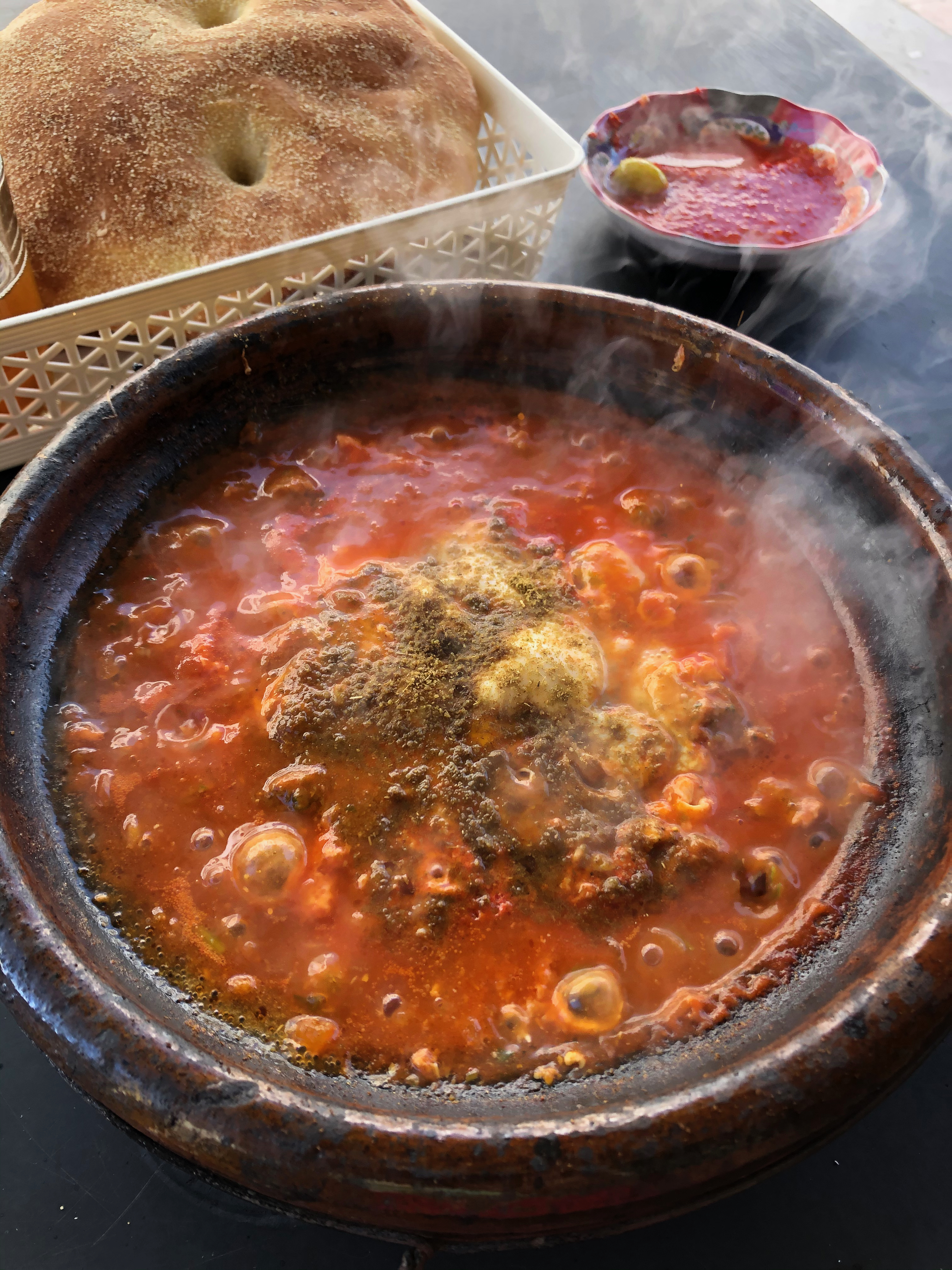
Tagine with tomato, meatballs, and egg served boiling hot in Casablanca.

Algerian and Moroccan tagine dishes are slow-cooked stews, typically made with sliced meat, poultry or fish together with vegetables or fruit. Spices, nuts, and dried fruits are also used. Common spices include ginger, cumin, turmeric, cinnamon, and saffron. Paprika and chili are used in vegetable tagines. The sweet and sour combination is common in tagine dishes like lamb with prunes and spices. Tagines are generally served with bread.

== Maghrebi Jewish tagine ==
Maghrebi Jews also eat and prepare tagine, owing to their historic presence in North Africa. Tagine is a very important dish in Sephardi cuisine, and is commonly eaten and prepared by Moroccan Jews, Algerian Jews, Tunisian Jews, Libyan Jews, Djerban Jews, and by French Jews, Jewish Americans, and Israelis, due to the large population of Sephardim in those countries.

Tagine is a mainstay of Sephardic cuisine commonly prepared for Shabbat dinners in the Sephardi community, and served with couscous. Sephardim from different regions prepare different styles of tagine; for instance, Moroccan Jews often prepare tagine with dried fruits, while Tunisian Jews often prepare a vegetable tagine containing potatoes, carrots, and zucchini cut into large dice. Tagine is also commonly prepared for Jewish holidays such as Rosh Hashanah and the Yom Kippur break-fast.

== Gallery ==
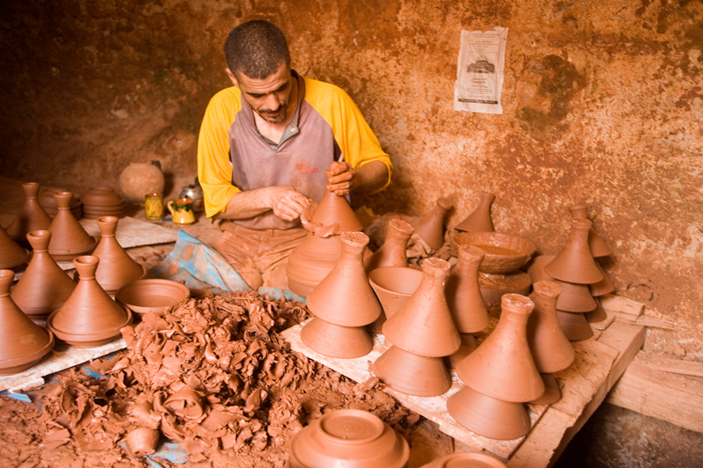
Tajine potter

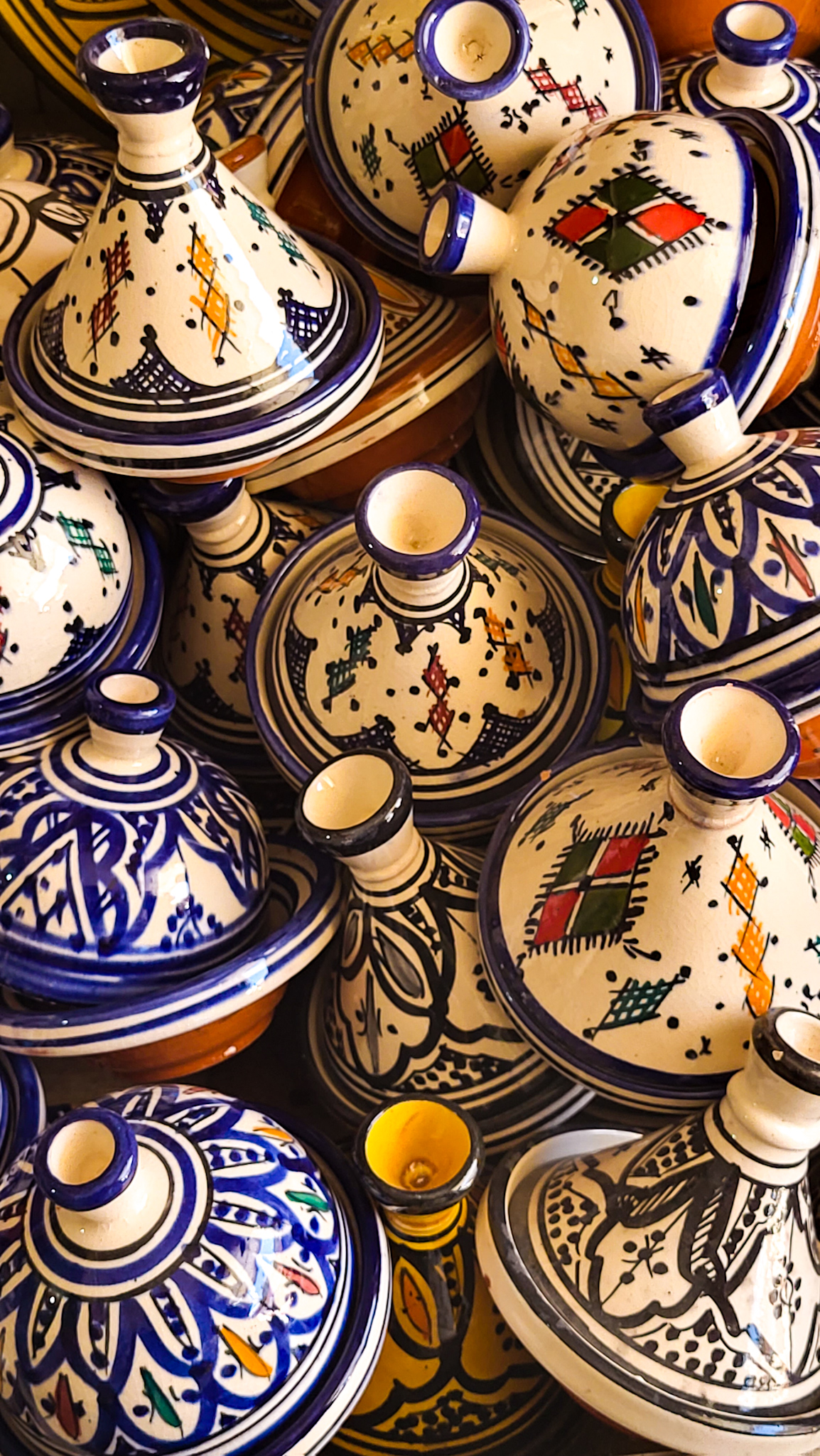
Decorated tagine

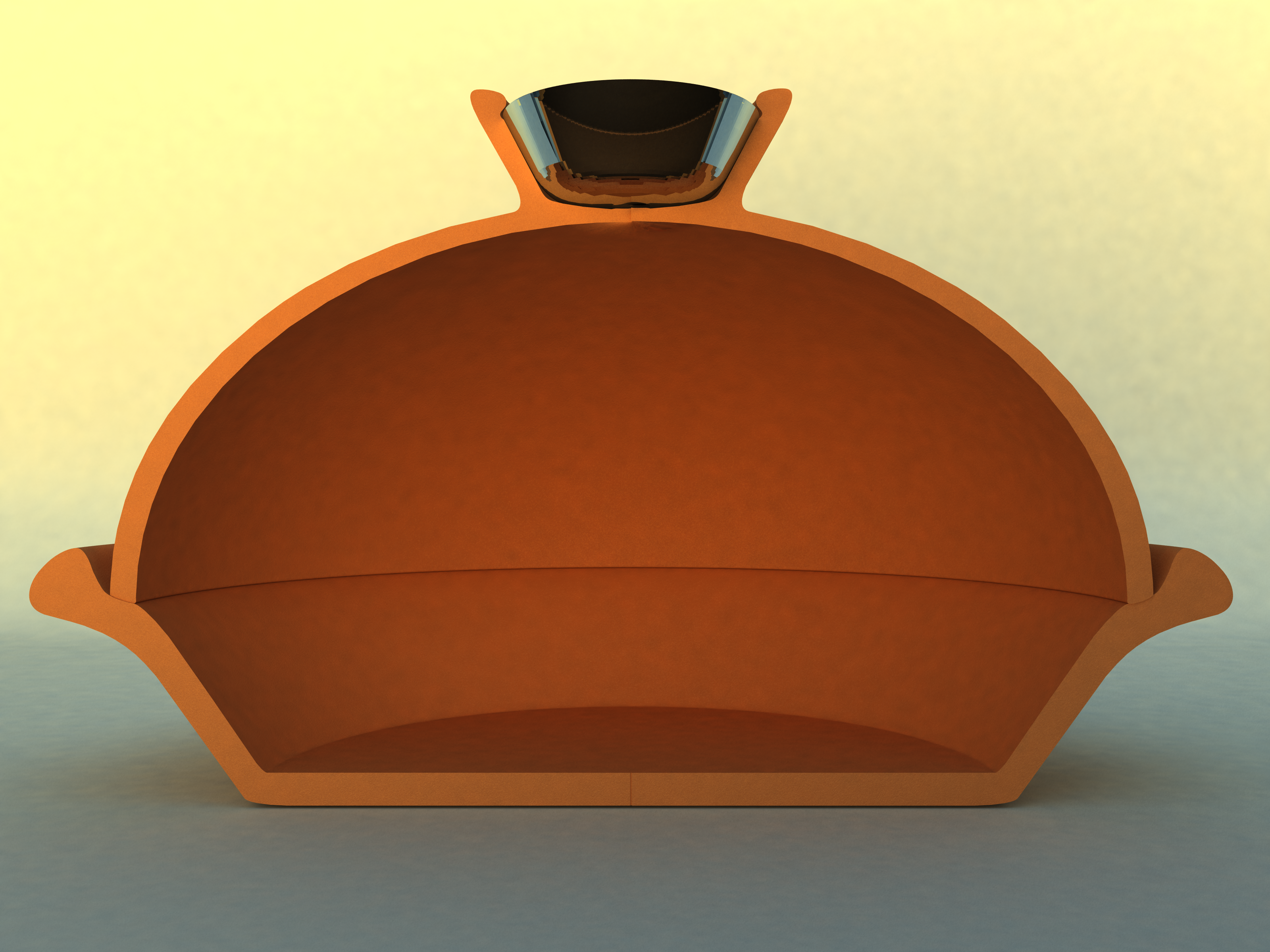
Cross section of a dome-lidded tajine

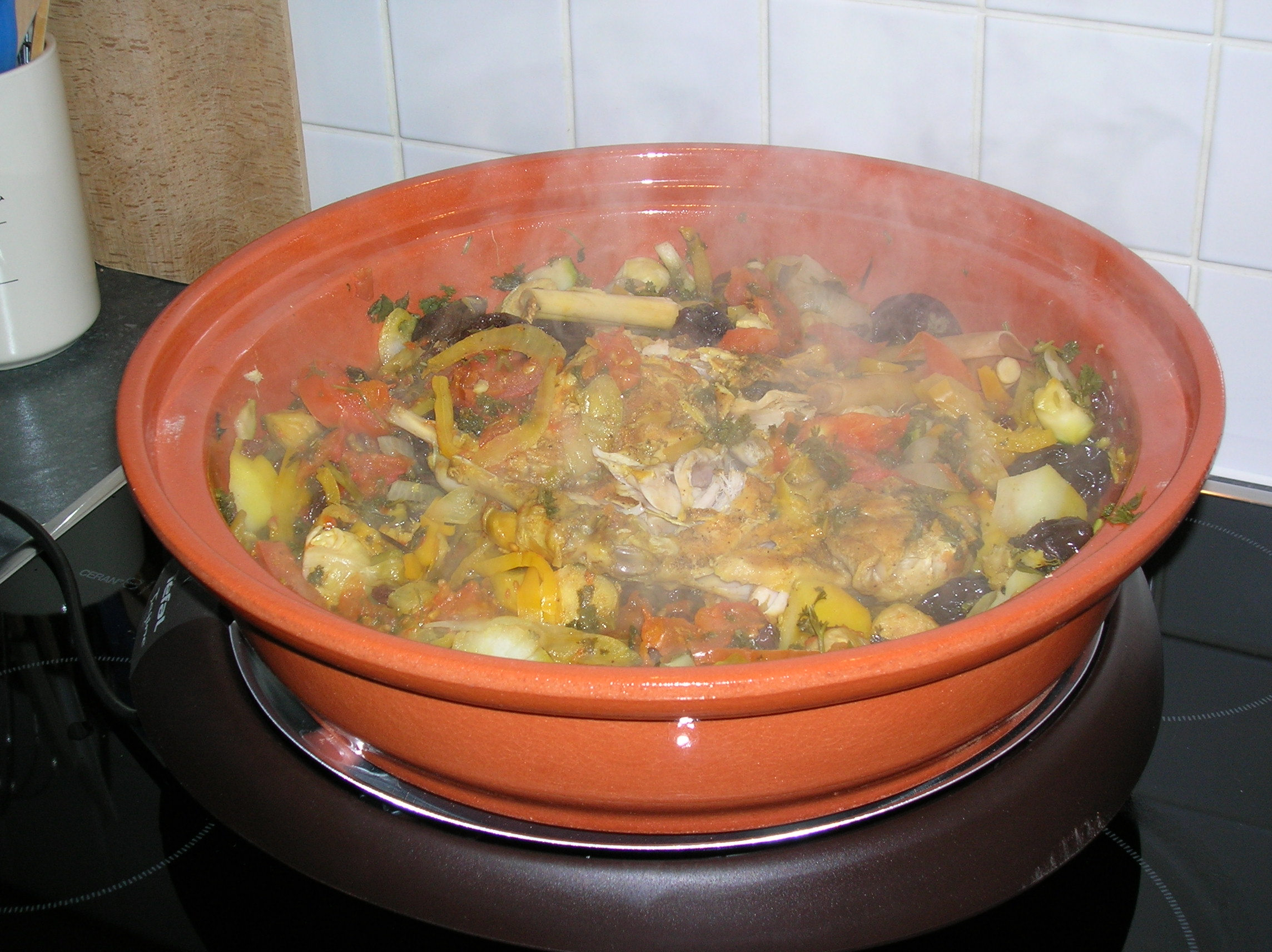
Electrical tajine

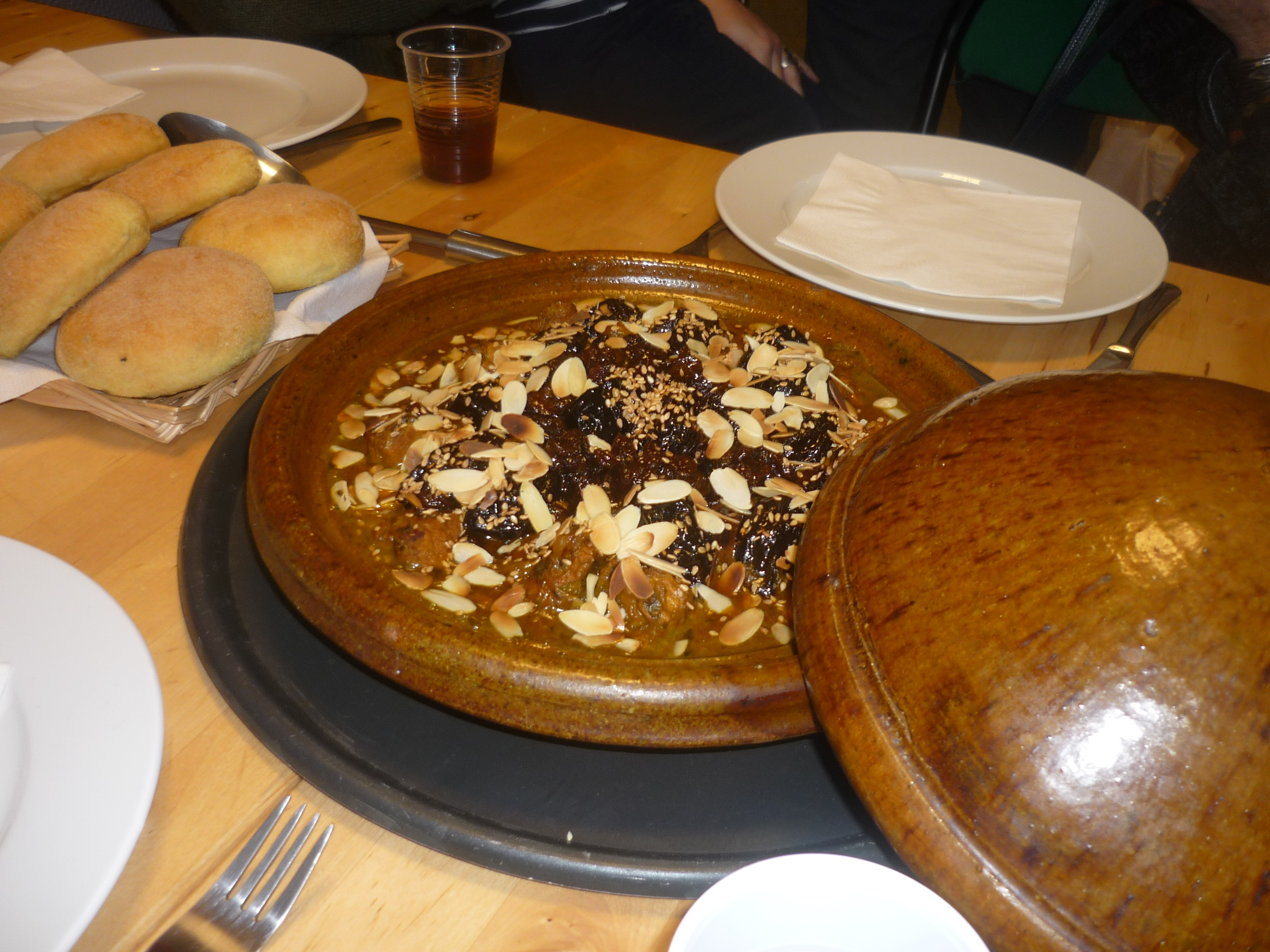
Tajine with lamb, prunes and almonds

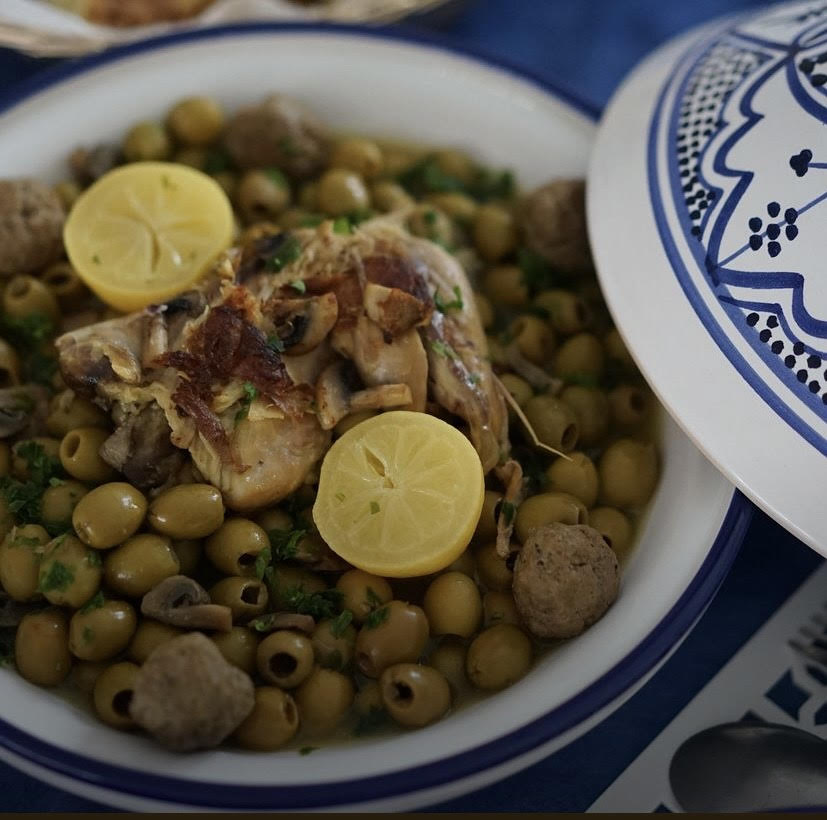
Algerian tajine with chicken, meatballs and olives

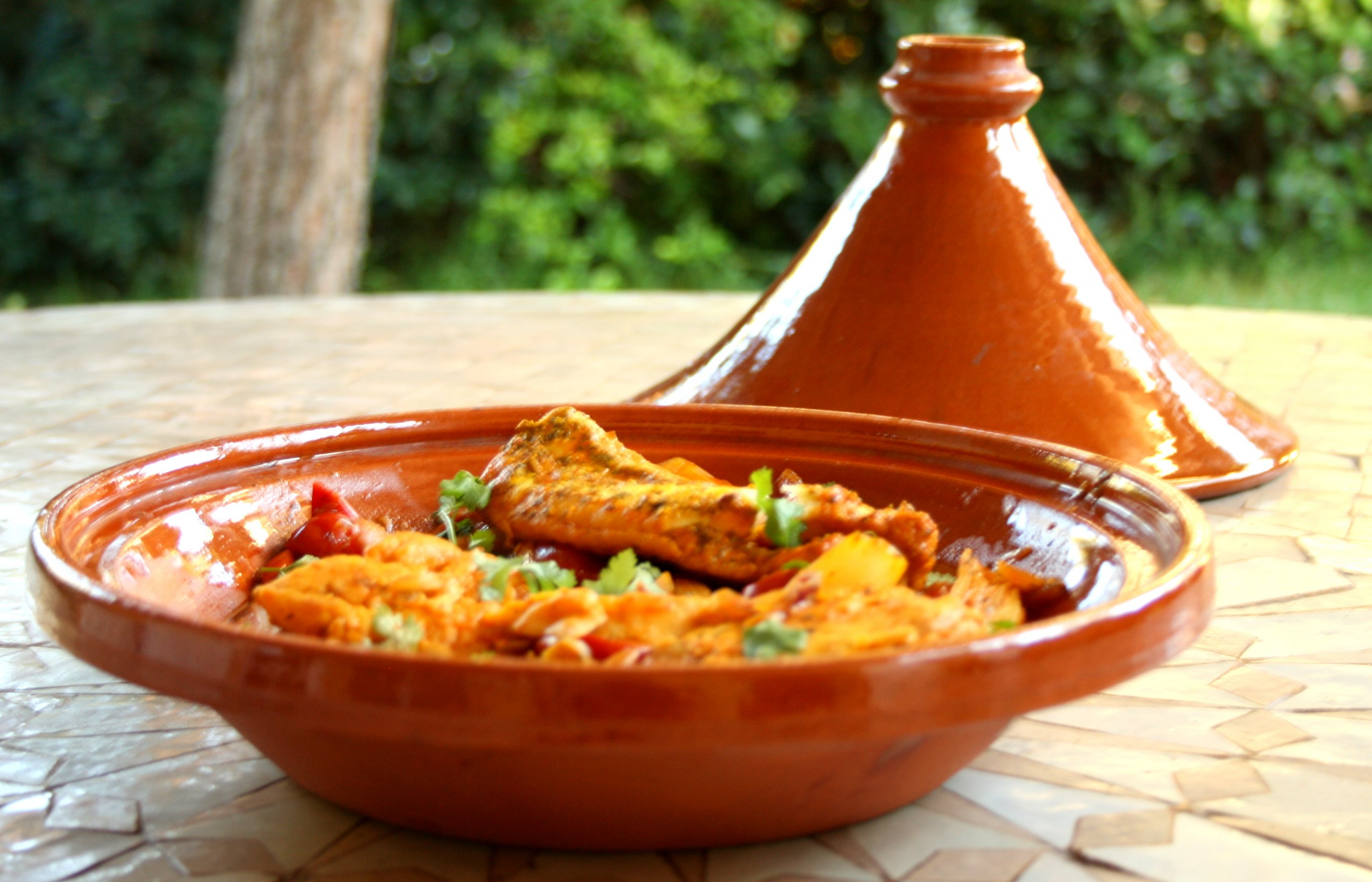
A Moroccan tajine

== See also ==
- List of Middle Eastern dishes
- List of African dishes
- List of egg dishes
- Berber cuisine
- List of stews
- Rfissa
- List of cooking vessels
