= Rfissa =

Moroccan dish

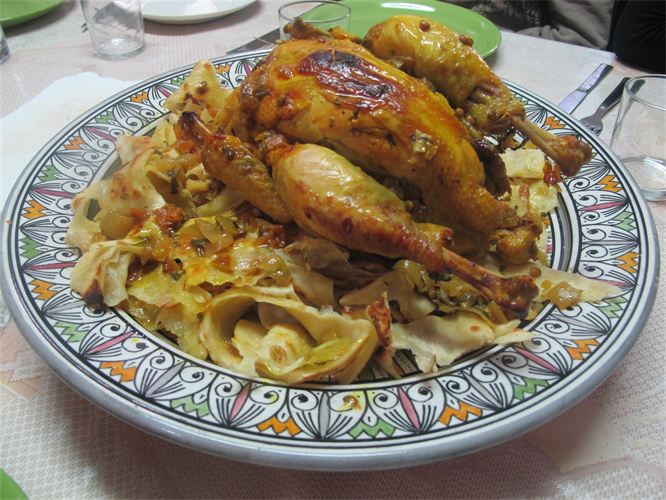
- Type: Tharid
- Place of origin: Morocco
- Main ingredients: Msemmen; Chicken; Lentils; Fenugreek; Ras el-hanout

Rfissa (Arabic: رفيسة; Standard Moroccan Tamazight: ⵔⵔⴼⵉⵙⴰ) is a Moroccan dish that is served during various traditional celebrations.

It traditionally includes chicken, lentils, fenugreek seeds (helba in Arabic), msemmen, meloui or day-old bread, and the spice blend ras el hanout.

It is traditional to serve rfissa to a woman who has just given birth, as fenugreek is purported to be beneficial for women that are recovering from childbirth.

Rfissa is derived from tharid (ثريد), a traditional Arab dish said to have been the Prophet Muhammad's favorite dish. The name rfissa goes back to the medieval rafis meaning dough kneaded with butter and dusted with sugar.

This dish did not appear in Moroccan cookbooks until the 1990s. The cultural historian Anny Gaul suggests that this might be due to the fact that rfissa is related to rural culinary traditions, whereas the people writing cookbooks for a long time were mostly Fessi elites.

== See also ==
- Couscous
- Tajine
