= Tangia =

Cooking vessel

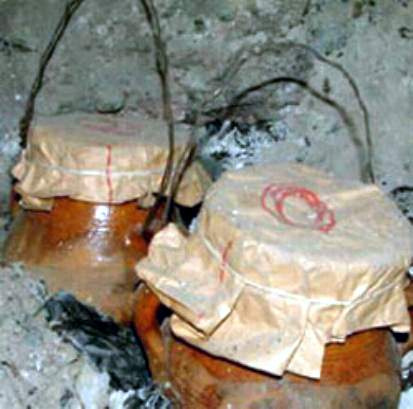
Tangia in ashes

Tangia (Arabic: طنجية) is an urn-shaped terra cotta cooking vessel. It is also the name of the stew cooked in the pot. It is common in Marrakesh, Morocco.

The Arabic طاجين (ṭajīn) is derived from Ancient Greek τάγηνον (tágēnon) 'frying-pan'. The Mediterannean tágēnon was a shallow, flat-bottomed skillet made of clay. A variety of earthenware cooking vessels in North Africa derive their names from this Greek origin, including Moroccan tagine and Tunisian tagine. The tangia, a deep, parchment-covered jar, originated in Marrakesh, Morocco.

Tangia is prepared with lamb shank or any other meat of choice, one or more preserved lemons, fresh whole cumin, garlic, and saffron melted in water and two tablespoons of olive oil. All the ingredients are put in an amphora that is covered with sealed parchment paper, placed in the embers or the oven and slow cooked for hours. Traditionally, it would be cooked overnight in the ashes of a household hearth or a hammam.

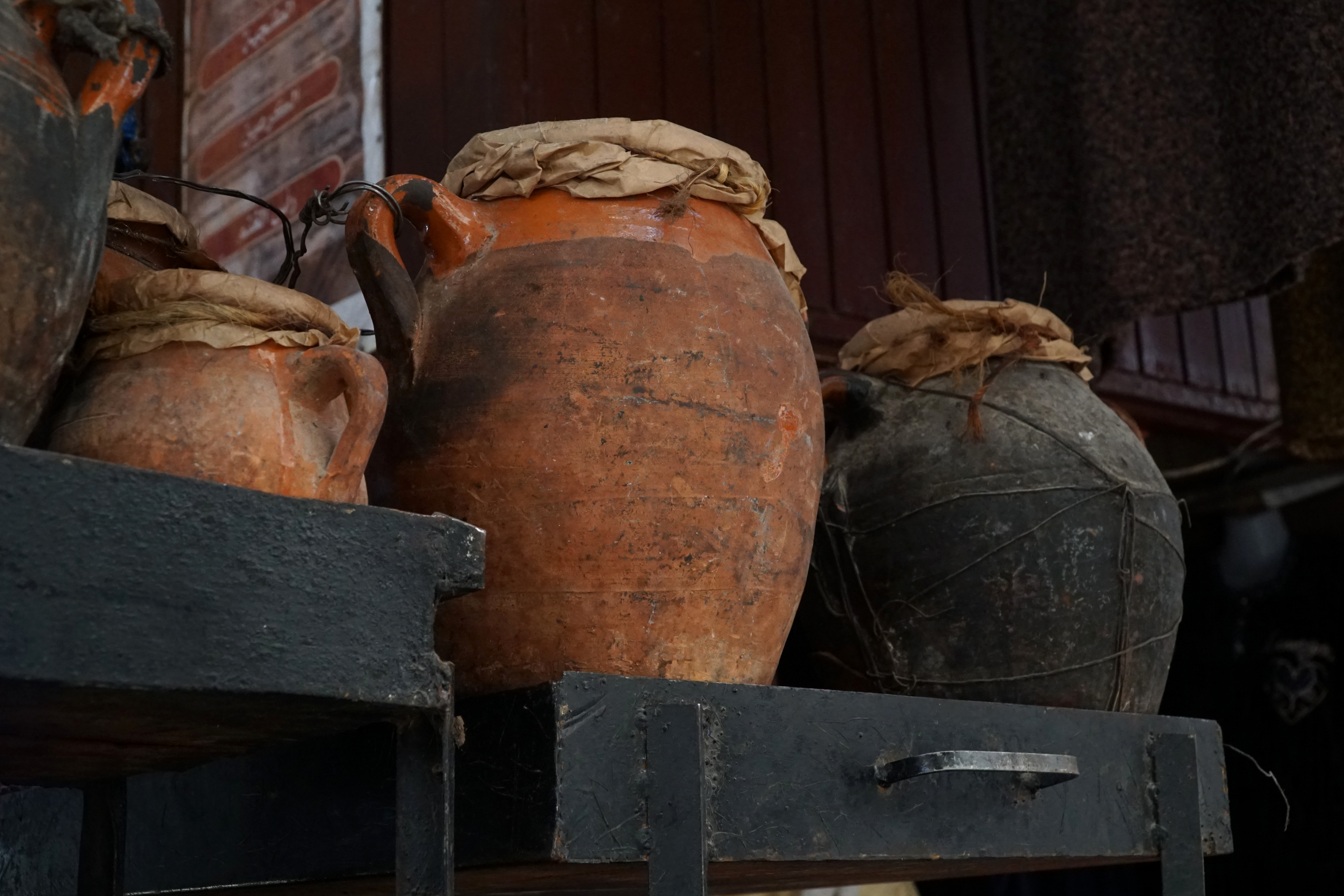
Tangia dishes in Marrakesh

== See also ==
- Tajine
- Bastilla
- Harira
- Tharid
- Taktouka
- Bissara
