= Tajine Zitoun =

Stew

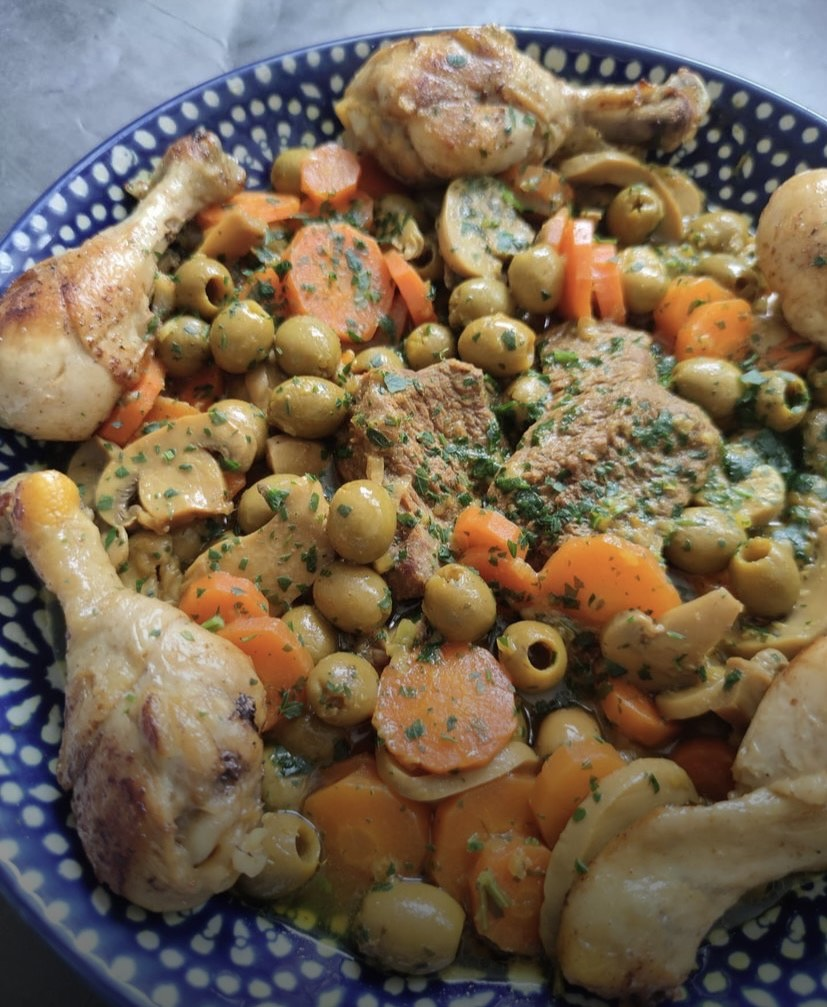
- Traditional olive tajine with chicken, carrots, mushrooms and olives, in Algiers, Algeria.
- Alternative names: Tagine Zitoune, Tajine Zitoun, Tajine Zitoun, Olive Tagine.
- Course: Main course, side dish
- Place of origin: Algeria
- Main ingredients: Olives

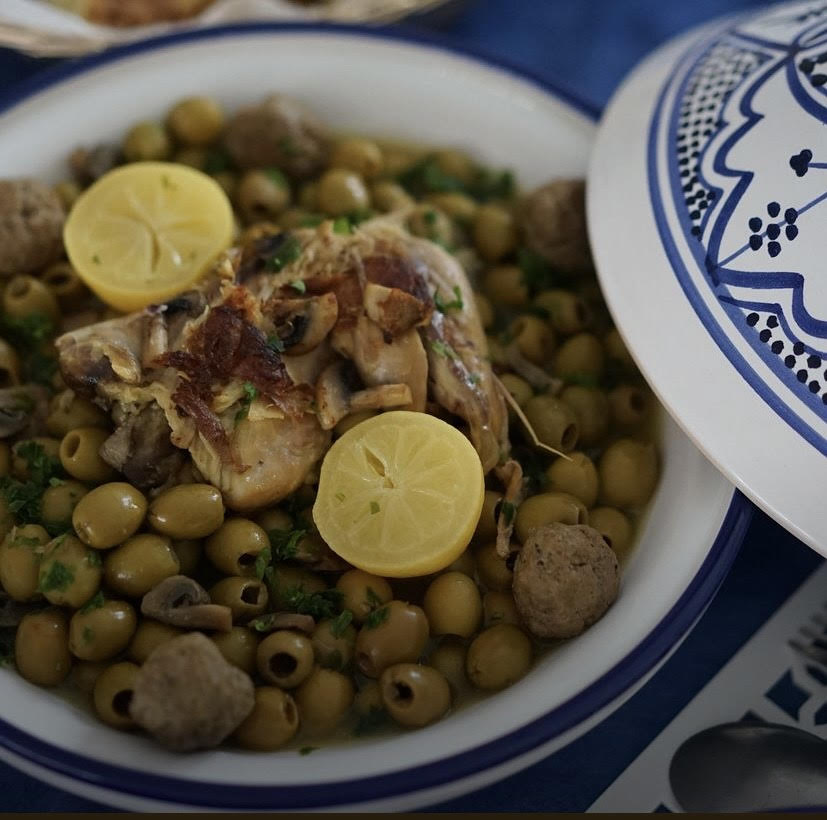
Algerian tajine with chicken, meatballs and olives

Tajine Zitoun or Tajine El Zitoune (Arabic: طاجين الزيتون) or Tagine Zitoune or Olive Tajine is a traditional Algerian stew from the city of Algiers. It is named after the earthenware pot in which it is cooked, a tajine pot. Tajine zitoun typically includes lamb, turkey or chicken and olives as the main ingredient, often also with some combination of onions, carrots, mushrooms or other vegetables, and is often seasoned with thyme, bay leaves, lemon juice, and saffron or turmeric. In Constantine, Algeria, the savory dish could be chicken or beef tongue simmered with only olives and mushrooms, or meatballs broken down, then cooked in sauce with mushrooms and olives.

== Preparation and variations ==
Some preparations call for the olives to be blanched in boiling water, then drained, before adding them into the recipe, to remove some of the salt.

The dish has variations depending on the region of Algeria, but all include olives. Like most Algerian dishes, some variations include a white or red sauce, some specify chicken or lamb or minced meat dumplings. Some include other vegetables. In the Oran district of western Algeria, which is known for both olive groves and mushroom farms, mushrooms are generally included in the local variation, Tajine bi Zeitoun. Saffron is preferred in this dish, but turmeric is often substituted for economy's sake.

== Cultural significance ==
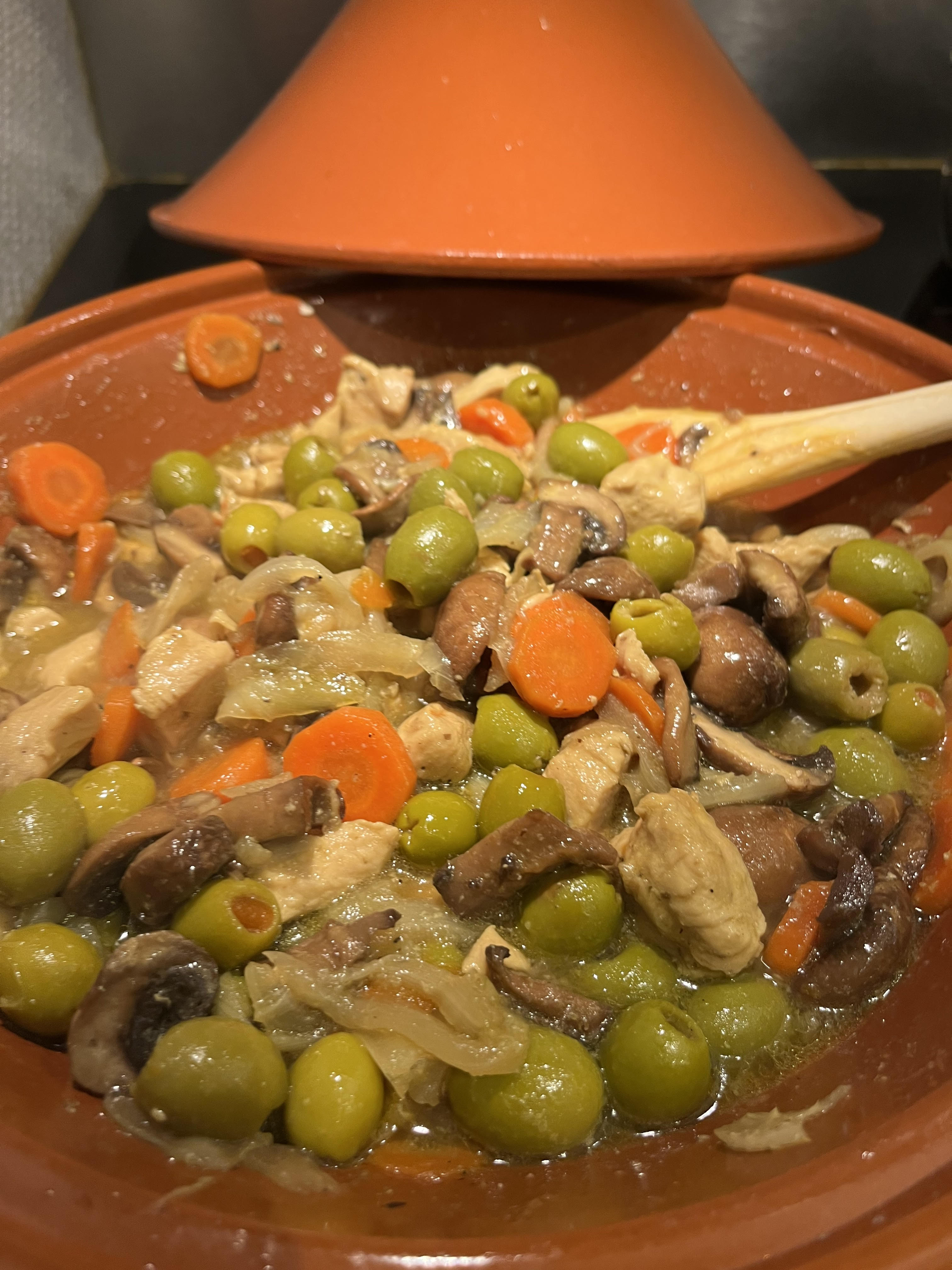
Algerian tajine zitoun with chicken, carrots and mushrooms

Olive trees have a long history in Algeria, dating back to ancient times. The country has a large number of olive groves, especially in the northern and coastal regions, where the climate and soil are well-suited for olive cultivation.

Algeria is one of the largest producers of olives and olive oil in the world, and the olive tree is considered to be one of the country's most important agricultural crops. The olive oil produced in Algeria is highly prized for its quality and flavor, and is used in cooking and as a condiment.

Olive trees in Algeria are typically grown in small family farms and serve as a primary source of income among rural communities. The olive harvest season in Algeria usually takes place between November and February where it is also a moment of celebration and community spirit.

In recent years, the Algerian government has taken steps to promote the growth of the country's olive industry, including providing incentives for farmers to plant more olive trees and investing in modern equipment and technology to improve the efficiency and quality of olive oil production.
