= Mouloud (disambiguation) =

Mouloud is a town of Djibouti.

Mouloud or Mawlud may also refer to:

== People ==
=== Mouloud ===
- Mouloud Achour (journalist, born 1944) (1944–2020), an Algerian writer, professor, and journalist
- Mouloud Achour (journalist, born 1980), French-Algerian journalist
- Mouloud Akloul (born 1983), a French footballer
- Mouloud Belatrèche (born 1976), an Algerian footballer
- Mouloud Kacem Naît Belkacem (1927–1992), an Algerian politician, philosopher, historian, and writer
- Mouloud Feraoun (1913–1962), an Algerian writer
- Mouloud Hamrouche (born 1943), an Algerian politician
- Mouloud Mammeri (1917–1989), an Algerian writer, anthropologist and linguist
- Mouloud Mekhnache, an Algerian handball player
- Mouloud Moudakkar (born 1972), a Moroccan footballer
- Mouloud Noura (born 1982), an Algerian judoka
- Mouloud Sihali (born 1976), Algerian-British terrorist
- Mohamed Mouloud Harim (born 1985), an Algerian footballer

=== Mawlud ===
- Mawlud Mukhlis (1886–1951), an Iraqi politician

== Places ==
- Mouloud Mammeri University, an Algerian university
- Tafraout El Mouloud, a town and commune in Morocco

== See also ==
- Mawlid (disambiguation)
- Mouloudia (disambiguation)
