= Blusa =

Algerian clothing

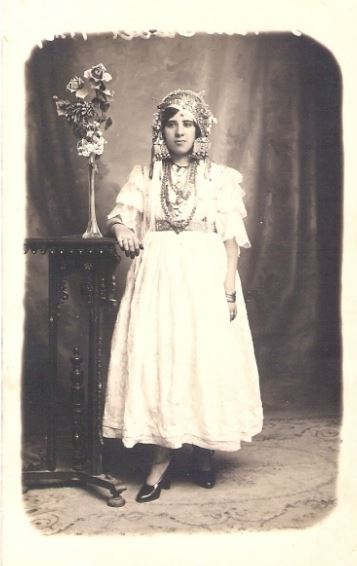
- Type: Algerian clothing
- Place of origin: Algeria

The blusa is a full-length dress with short sleeves originating from the Oran and Tlemcen region of Algeria.

It is a garment worn by urban women in north-western Algeria. The garment was conceived and developed in the Algerian cities Tlemcen and Oran. The ancestor of the modern blusa is the abaya dress, which derives from the medieval tunic worn in ancient Algerian cities from the east and west.

The blusa has variations, including the most central and expensive variation, the bridal golden silk blusa called the bluset-el-mensouj. It is cut from a handwoven traditional mensouj silk characterised by golden and coloured vertical stripes. We can find also other variations of the blusa from different cities in the western part of the country, such as; buset -el-zaiim, blouzet-el-harrar, blouset-eddar, etc.

The bluset-el-mensouj was inscribed in 2012 in the UNESCO, as an Intangible Heritage Of Humanity.
