= Mohamed Mouloud Harim =

Algerian footballer (born 1985)

Mohamed Mouloud Harim (born November 8, 1985, in Tizi Ouzou) is an Algerian professional footballer who played as a midfielder for MC Saïda in the Algerian Championnat National.

== Career ==
- 2003–2005 JS Kabylie (Algeria)
- 2005–pres. MC Saïda (Algeria)

== Honours ==
- Won the Algerian League once with JS Kabylie in 2004
- Finalist of the Algerian Cup once with JS Kabylie in 2004
