= Rechta =

Algerian dish

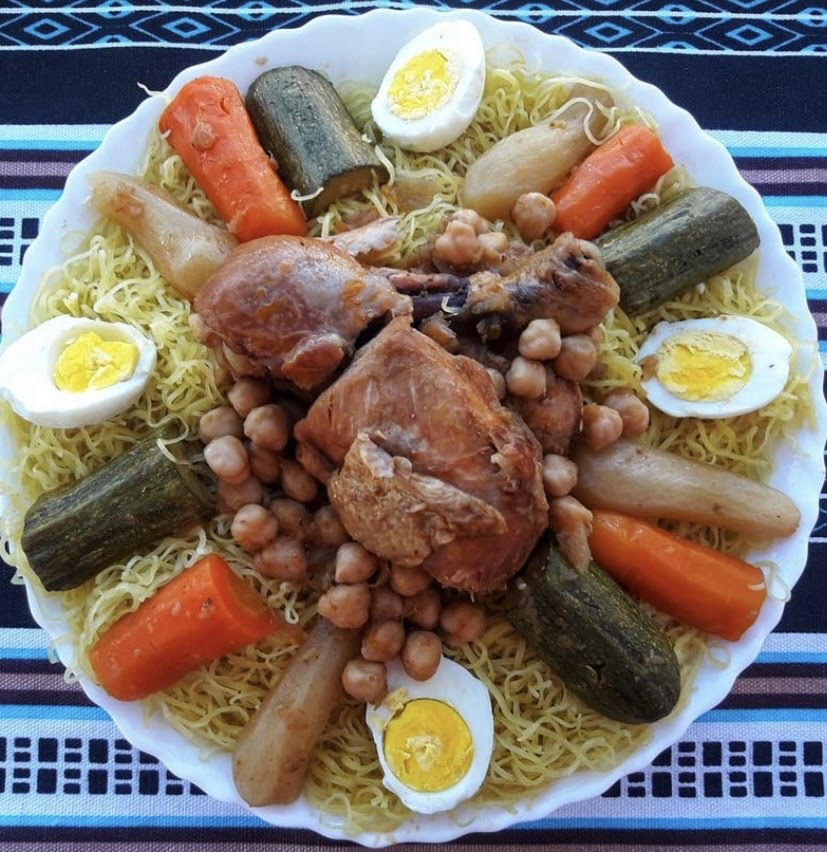
- Traditional Algerian rechta with chicken and vegetables in Algiers
- Alternative names: Tarechta
- Course: Main course
- Place of origin: Algeria
- Serving temperature: Hot
- Variations: Algerian rechta

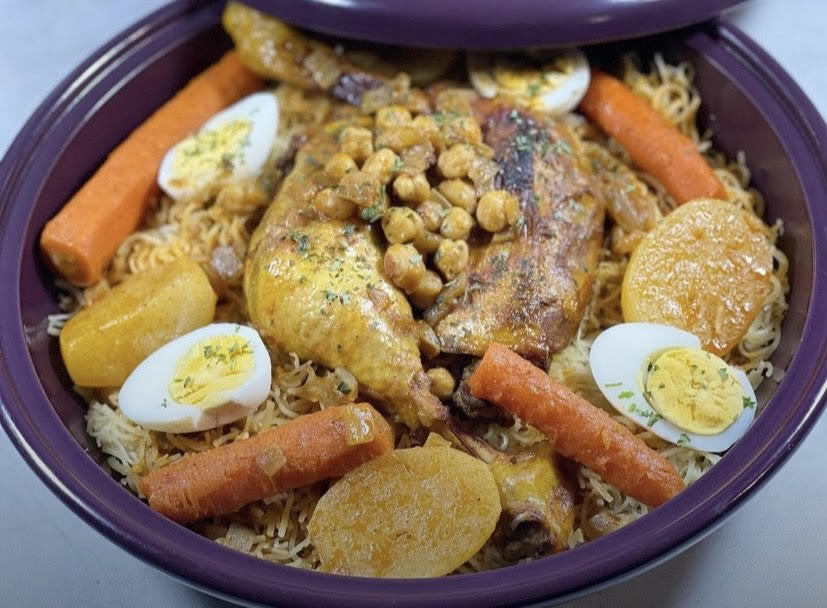
Algerian chicken and vegetable rechta with red sauce

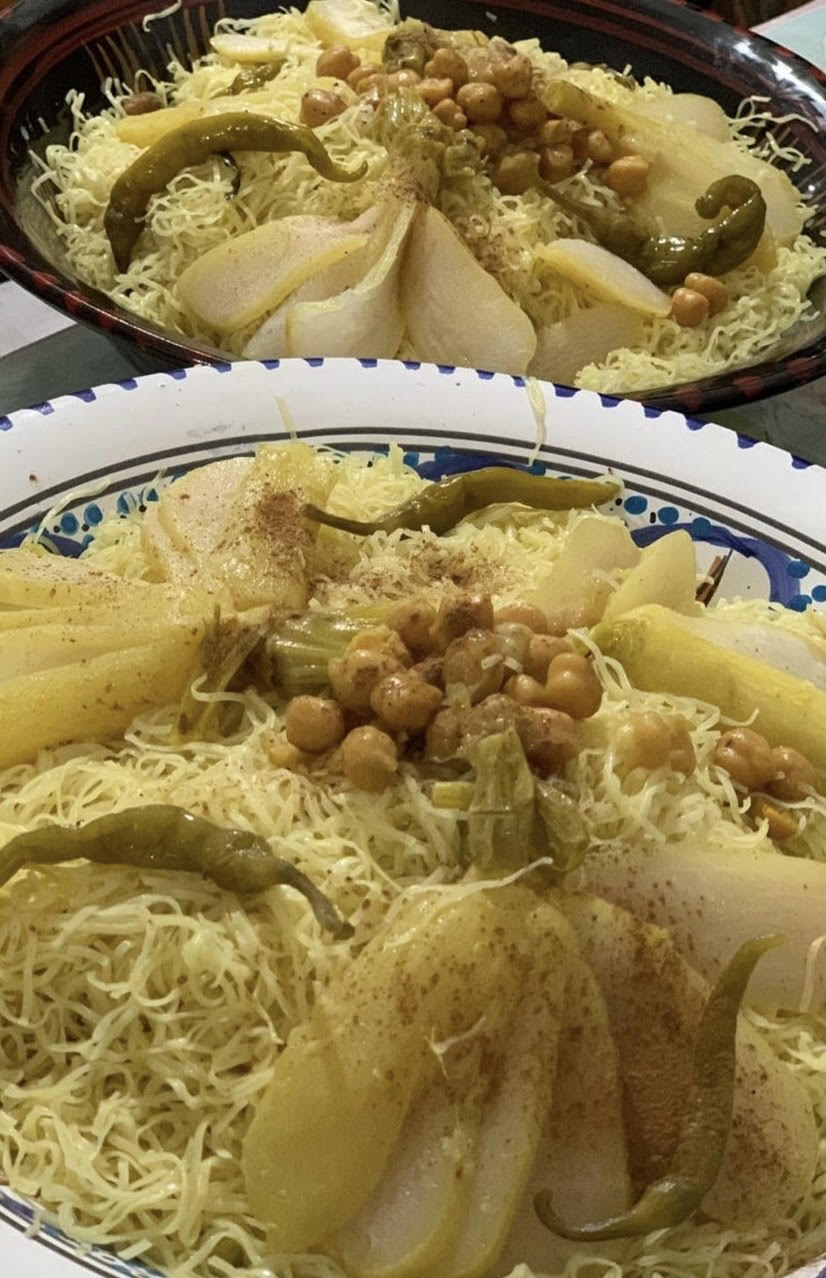
Algerian rechta

Rechta (Arabic: رشتة) is a dish made from pasta cut into thin fresh artisan strips, typical of Algeria. It is in particular the symbolic dish of Algiers cuisine.

== Etymology ==
The word comes from the Persian rista, meaning "thread" and commonly used to refer to pasta.

The word rechta is Berberised to tarechta, still commonly used in Oran and Tlemcen in Algeria, from the root rkt or rcht.

== Variants ==
=== Algeria ===
Rechta is a popular pasta dish in Algeria, and is particularly beloved in the cities of Algiers, Blida, and Constantine, where it is considered a specialty.

In Algiers and Blida the most famous rechta is typically served with chicken, chickpeas, and turnips, in a sauce that is seasoned with white pepper and cinnamon. Other versions include potatoes and other vegetables and sometimes include a roux made from flour and oil, which is used to thicken the sauce and give it a smooth texture. The pasta itself is typically made from a combination of semolina flour and water, and is rolled out into long, flat noodles that are cut into strips.

In Constantine, rechta is often served with a tomato-based sauce that includes a variety of vegetables, such as onions, carrots and green peppers. The sauce may also contain meat or poultry, such as chicken or lamb, and is typically flavored with herbs like parsley and cilantro. Some versions of the dish may also include chickpeas or other legumes. The pasta used in Constantine is similar to that used in Algiers, and is also made from semolina flour and water.

In both cities, rechta is considered a festive dish that is often served on special occasions like weddings and religious holidays.

=== Tunisia ===
In Tunisia, rechta is also consumed in Bizerte, but it is typically served in a soup or stew. The pasta is often prepared in a similar way to Algerian rechta, but it is cut into shorter lengths and may be a bit wider, particularly with rechta jerya or rechta njara.

== See also ==
- Reshteh (Iranian variant of the same noodles)
