= Milad Omranloo =

Iranian conductor (born 1977)

- Born: 1977 (age 48–49); Ahvaz, Iran
- Origin: Tehran
- Occupations: Conductor, Composer
- Instruments: Timpani, Percussion
- Years active: 2000

Milad Omranloo (Persian: میلاد عمرانلو) is an Iranian conductor. He led the Tehran Vocal Ensemble to a gold medal at the 2009 World Choir Championship.

He graduated in Composing from the University of Art and successfully completed his education with a master's degree.
