= Tharid =

Traditional Arab stew often consumed during Ramadan

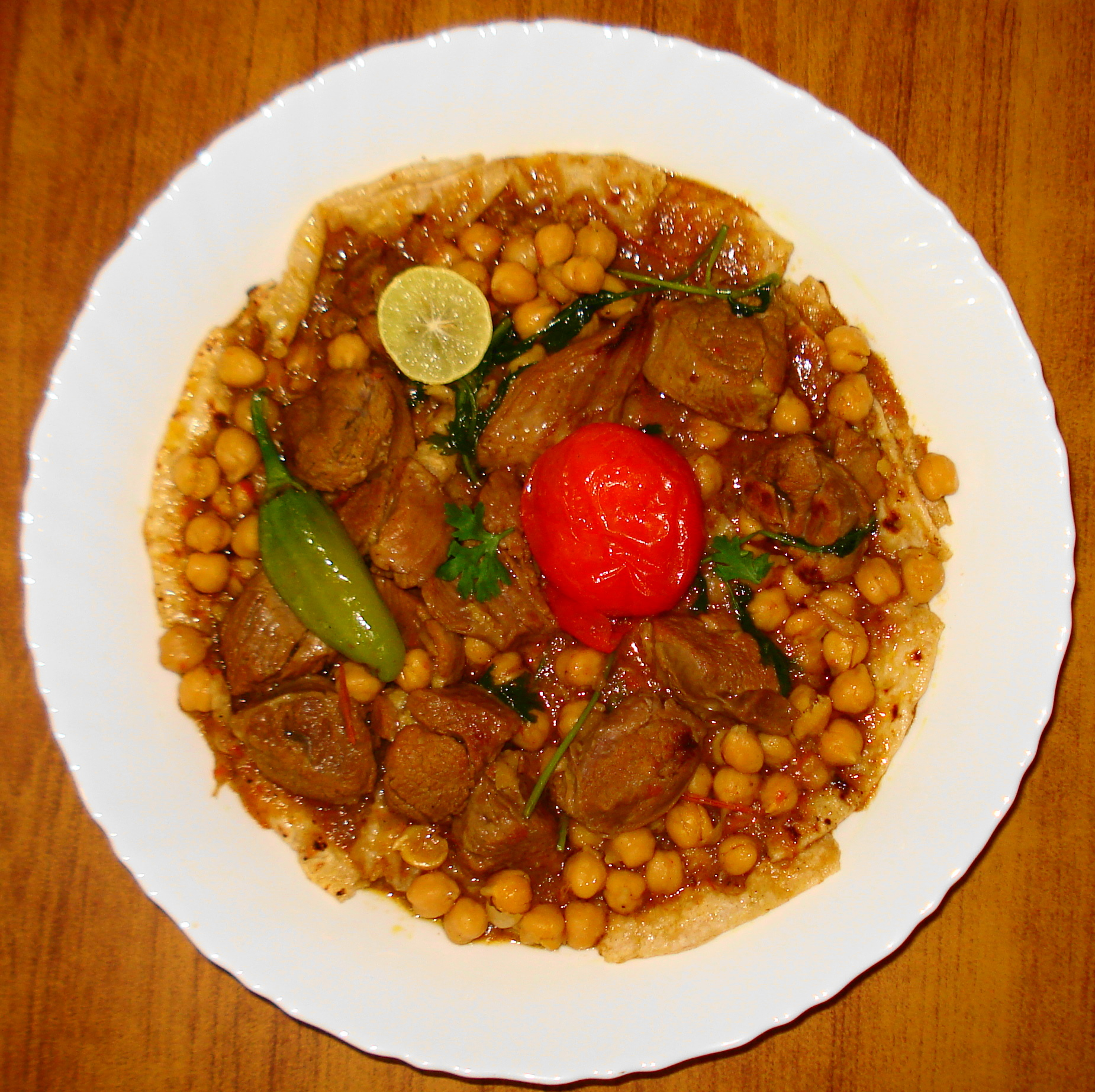
- Tharid
- Alternative names: Trid, taghrib, tashreeb or thareed
- Type: Stew
- Course: Main course
- Place of origin: Mecca, Saudi Arabia
- Region or state: North Africa, Middle East and Southeast Asia
- Serving temperature: Main dish
- Main ingredients: Bread, vegetable or meat broth

Tharid (Arabic: ثريد) also known as thareed, trid, fareed, tashrib, tashreeb or taghrib is a bread soup that originates from Mecca, Saudi Arabia, an Arab cuisine also found in many other Arab countries. Like other bread soups, it is a simple meal of broth and bread, in this instance crumbled flatbread moistened with broth or stew. Historically, the flatbread used was probably stale and unleavened. As an Arab national dish it is considered strongly evocative of Arab identity during the lifetime of the Islamic prophet Muhammad. According to a widespread cultural tradition, this unremarkable and humble dish was the prophet's favorite food.

It is a common Ramadan dish.

== Origin ==
The dish is a mainstay of Arab culture, notable in that it is mentioned in a number of hadith attributed to the Islamic prophet Muhammad, in which he said that tharid was the best of all dishes, being superior to all others in the same way that his beloved third wife, the wise young Aishah, was superior to all other women.

== Spread ==
Tharid is not only widespread in the Arabian Peninsula, but also in North Africa, where it is known as trid; Turkey, where it is known as tirit; and even in Xinjiang, where it is known as terit. Multiple variations of the recipe were brought to Spain by the Arabs. The Moroccan rfissa is created by ladling a chicken and lentil stew on top of thin crepe-like flatbread (warqa) that has been cut into long thin pieces. In Syria, a similar dish named fatteh is a mix of roasted and minced flatbread with yogurt and cooked meat. In Egypt, it is pronounced fatta being roasted bread with meat, but also includes rice. In Indonesia, tharid is known via Malay cuisine, due to Arab influences on Malay culinary culture.

The dish also spread into Portugal, where it evolved to be a bread soup with cilantro, garlic, and eggs known as açorda Alentejana.

== Consumption ==
Dipping the bread into the broth and eating it with the meat is the simplest method of eating tharid. Another variation involves stacking the bread and the meat in several layers.

It is a common Ramadan dish.

== Gallery ==
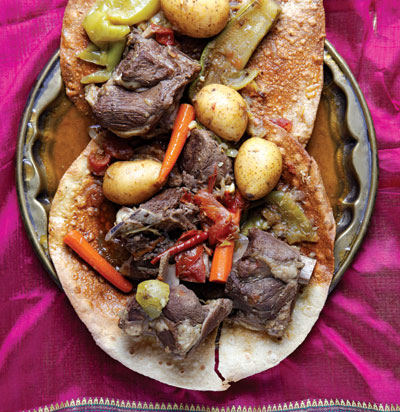
Lamb tharid, dry

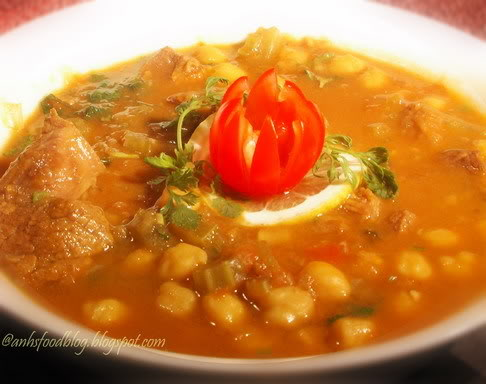
Lamb tharid soup

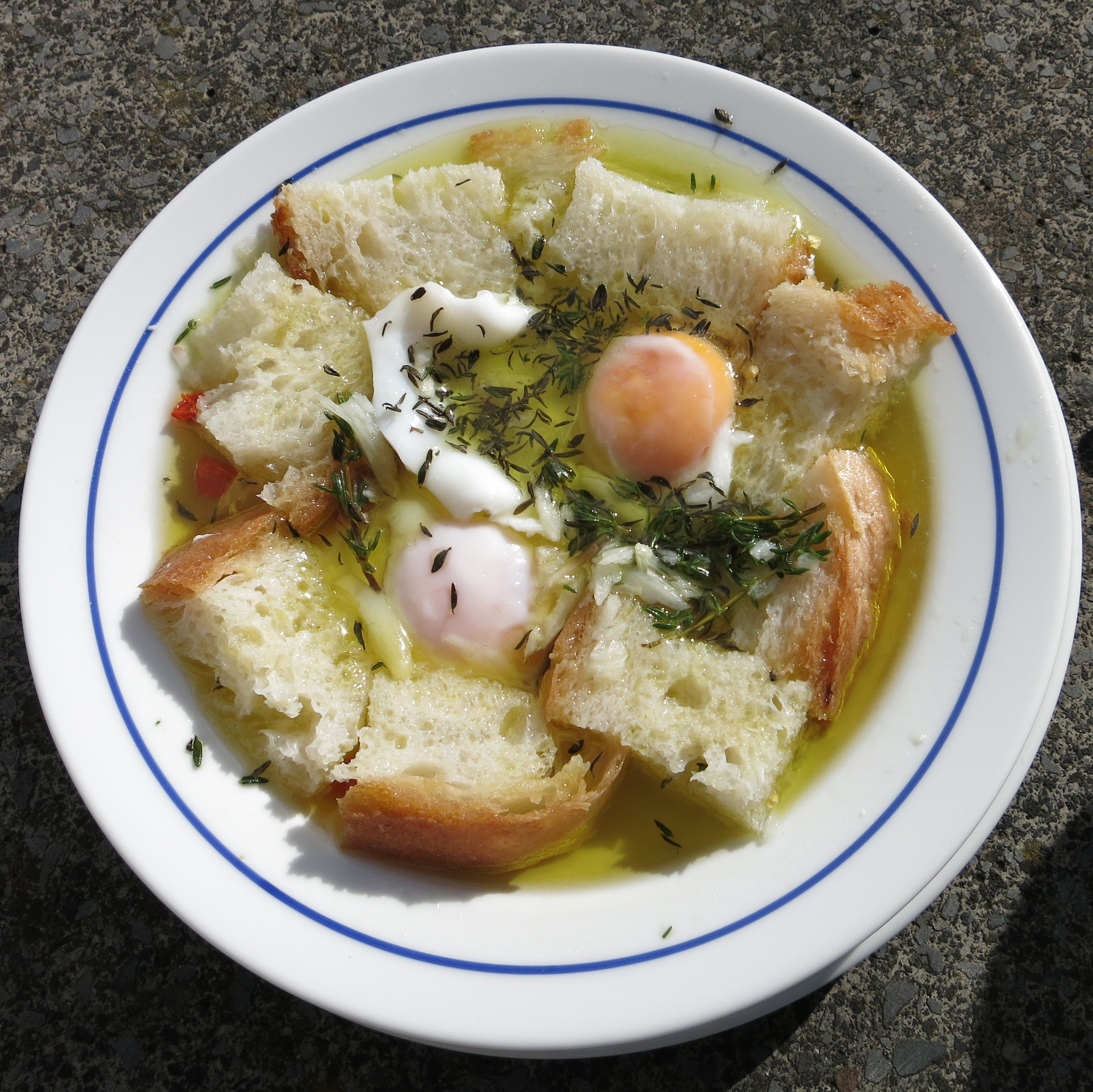
Portuguese açorda Alentejana

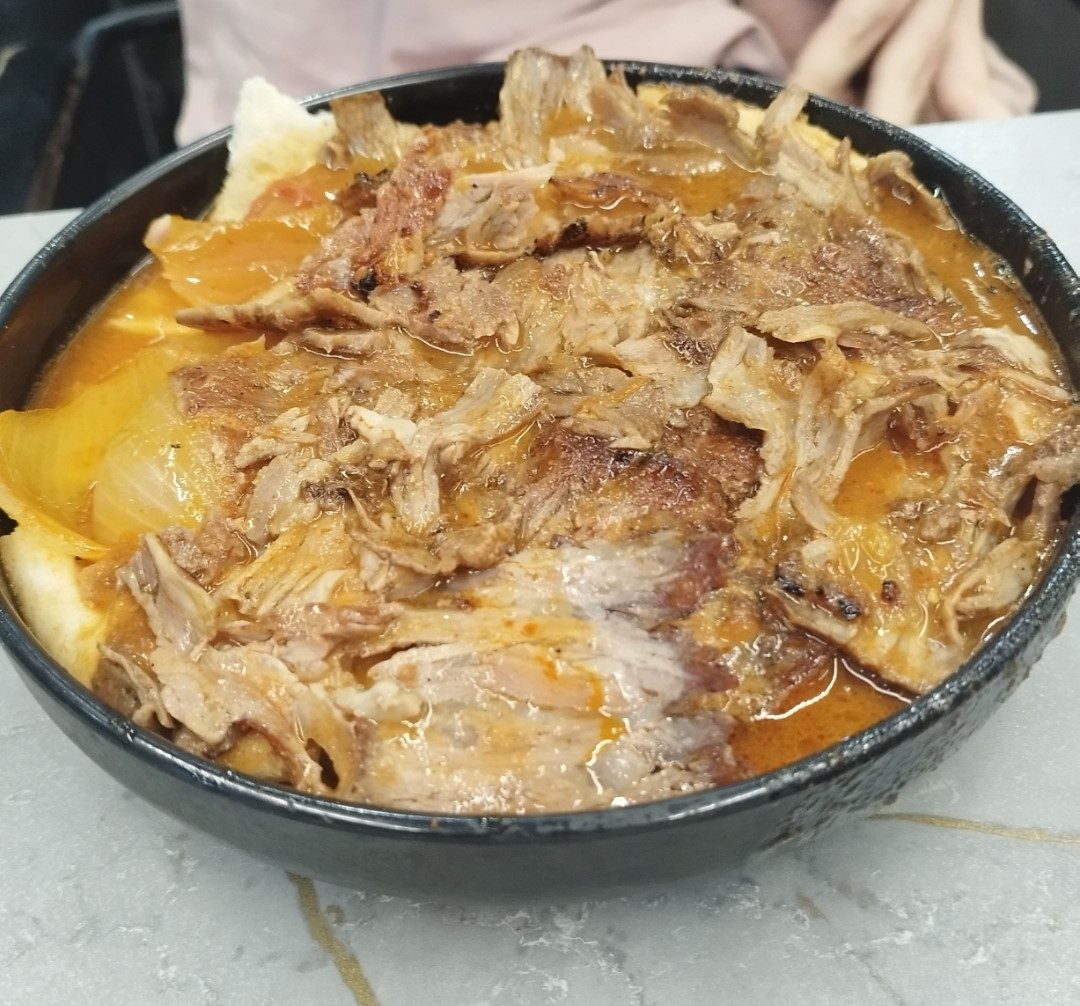
Iraqi tashrib guṣ

== See also ==
- Tajine
- Tanjia
- Harira
- Couscous
- Bastilla
- Tharida

== Notes ==
- Alan Davidson: The Oxford Companion to Food, 2nd. ed. Oxford 2006, Article Tharid, P. 794
