= Tajine lham-lahlou =

Stew

Lham Lahlou
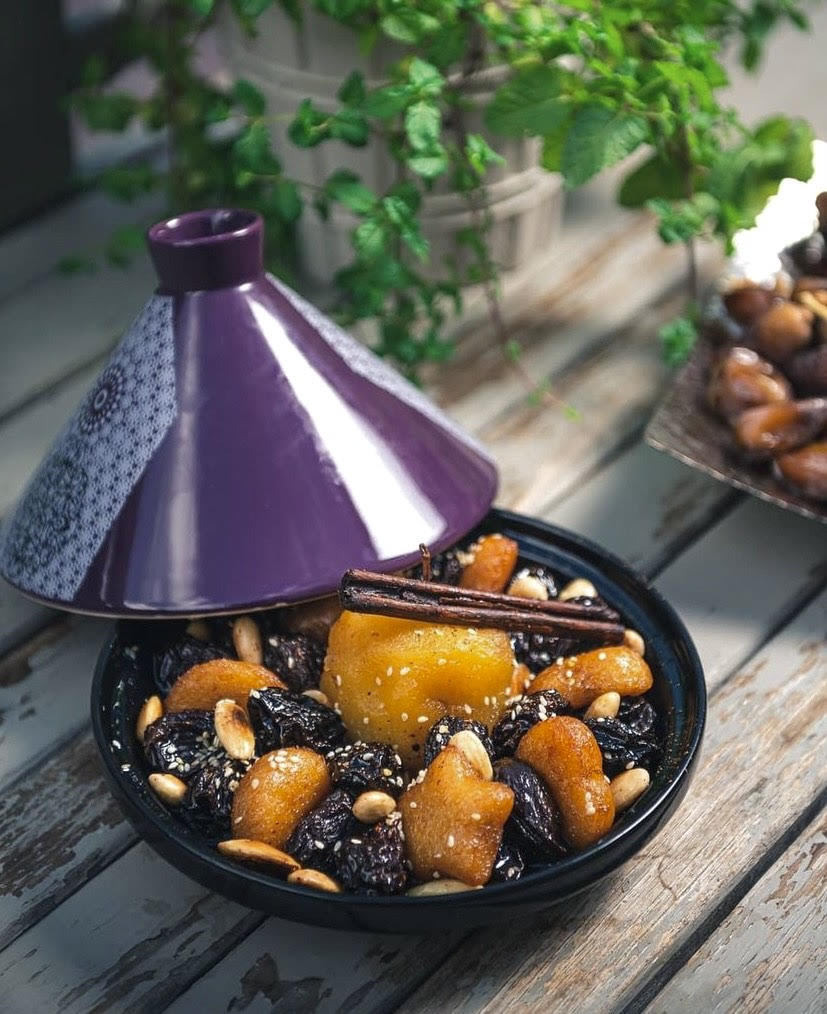
- Traditional Algerian tajine lham lahlou
- Alternative names: Tajine Lham Lahlou, Tajine Hlou, berkouk
- Course: Main course, side dish
- Place of origin: Algeria
- Main ingredients: Meat; Apricots; Prunes

Lham hlou (Arabic: لحم لحلو) also known as lham lahlou and tajine lahlou. which means "sweet meat" or "sweet tajne", is an Algerian sweet dish made with meat and mainly prunes, possibly with apricots and decorated with raisins and almonds in a syrup of sugar and orange blossom water. Apples are usually used as well. The meat and vegetables are first sauteed with onions and smen (traditional preserved North African butter). This dish is served as a starter or as a dessert during Ramadan and on the occasion of wedding celebrations.

Some recipes, such as La cuisine Algerienne's (1970), call for sprinkling the prunes with toasted almonds. and to steam the prunes prior to dipping them in the sweet sauce. Steamed prunes can be accompanied by almonds (1 almond for each prune).

== Regional names ==
Lham lahlou: This is the commonly used term in Algiers. For a literal translation, "tadjin lham lahlou" means "sweet meat dish".

Tadjin el aïn: In eastern Algeria, particularly in Constantine; "el aïn" is the local term for plums and prunes in this region.

Tadjin el barqoq: This is the common term used in Oran; "el barqoq" is the local name for plums and prunes in this region.

== Cultural significance ==
Lham Lahlou is traditionally eaten during Ramadan in Algeria, specifically to break the fast. This dish, rich in sugar content, serves as an excellent source of sustained energy for the evening prayers.
