= Algerian cuisine =

Culinary traditions of Algeria

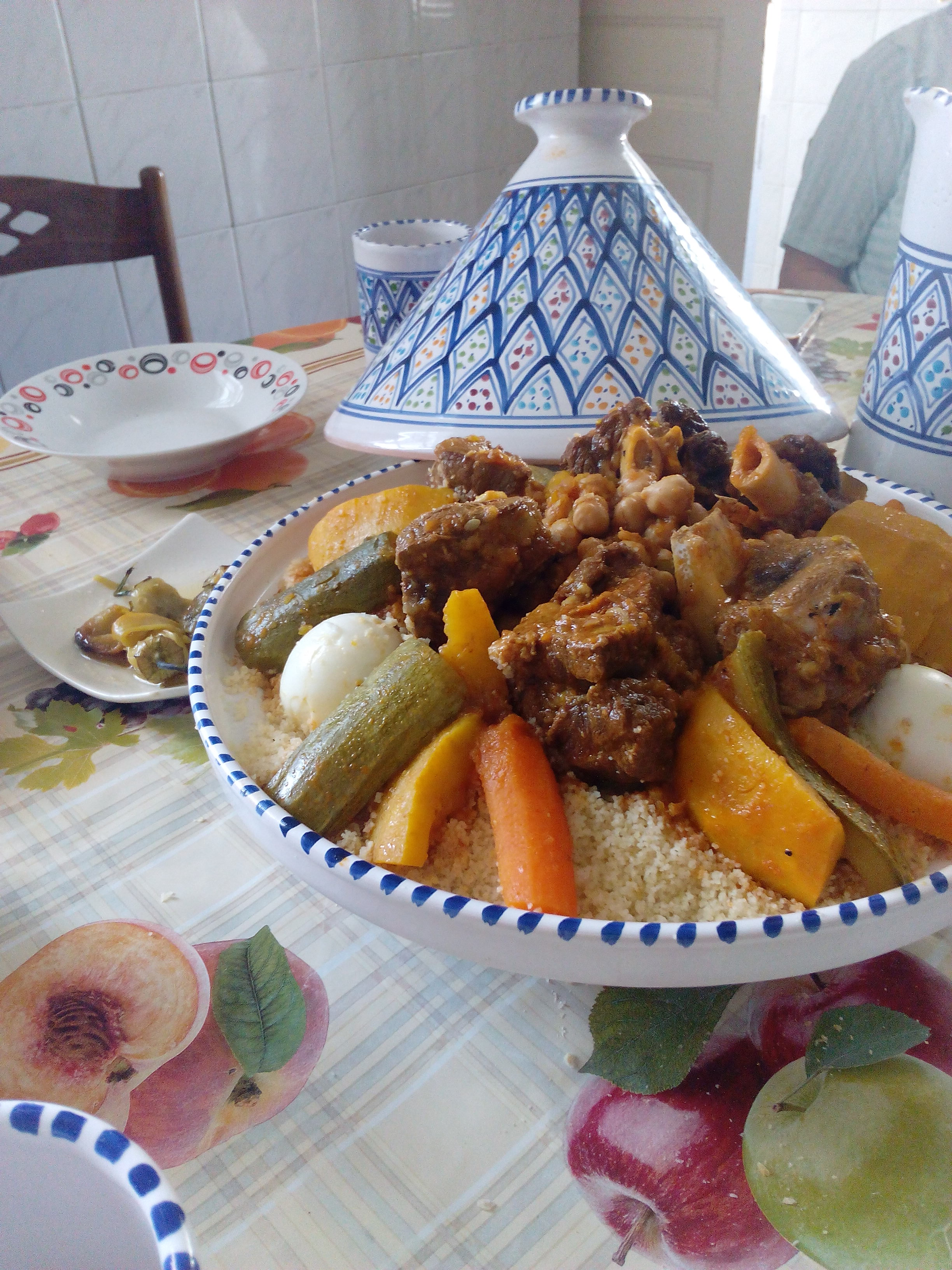
Couscous, often considered the national dish of Algeria

Algerian cuisine is influenced by Algeria's interactions and exchanges with other cultures and nations over the centuries. It is based on both land and sea products. Conquests or demographic movement towards the Algerian territory were two of the main factors of exchanges between the different peoples and cultures, introducing multiple flavors and influences, reflecting the country's history and position at the crossroads of the Mediterranean. Algerian cuisine arises from a mix of Arab, Berber, Turkish and European roots.

Algerian cuisine offers a variety of dishes depending on the region and the season, but vegetables and cereals remain at its core. Most Algerian dishes are centered around breads, meats (lamb, beef or poultry), olive oil, vegetables, and fresh herbs. Vegetables are often used for salads, soups, tajines, couscous, and sauce-based dishes. Of all the Algerian traditional dishes available, the most famous one is Algerian couscous, recognized as a national dish.

Pork consumption is forbidden to Muslims in Algeria, in accordance with Islamic dietary laws.

== Ingredients ==
Algeria, like other Maghreb countries, produces a large range of Mediterranean fruits and vegetables and even some tropical ones. Lamb is commonly consumed. Mediterranean seafood and fish are also eaten.

=== Meats ===
Algerians consume a significant amount of meat, and it is found in almost every dish. Mutton is the most eaten meat in the country.

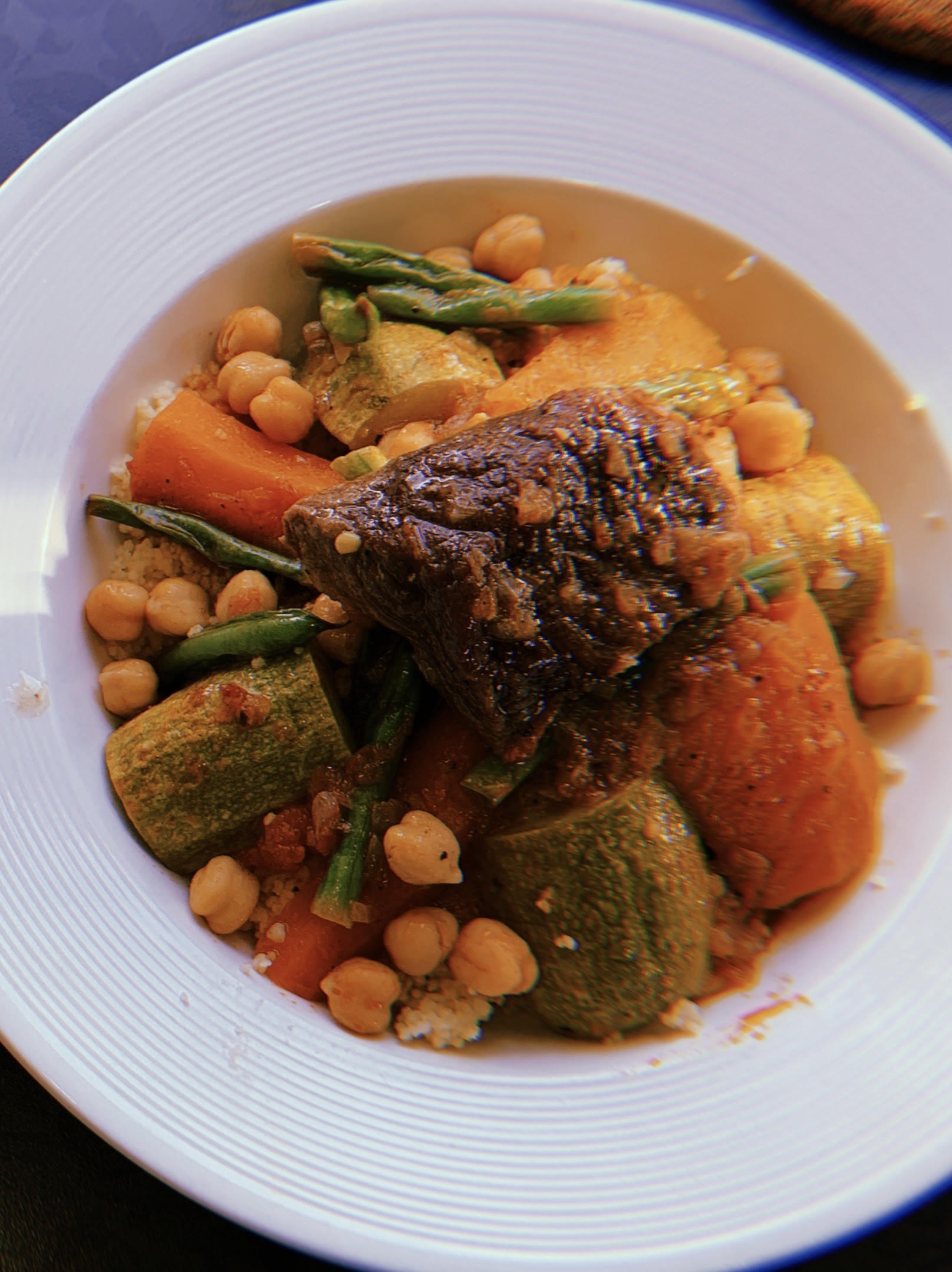
Algerian couscous with vegetables

Poultry and beef are also used; more uncommon types of meat such as game birds and venison are considered delicacies. In the south, dromedary (camel meat) is also eaten.

Meat could traditionally be dried in regions such as Kabylia as a way to preserve the meat for long amounts of time.

Merguez is a type of sausage originating from the Berber people.

=== Vegetables ===
Commonly eaten vegetables include potatoes (batata/betetè), carrots (zrodiya/sennariya), turnip (lefft), onions (bsel/besla), tomatoes (tomatish/tømètish/t'matem), zucchini (corget/qar'a /khyar), garlic (ethoum), cabbages (cromb), eggplant (bidenjan), olives (zéton), pennyroyal (fliou), cardoon (korchef), broad bean (fool), chickpea (homoss), artichoke (qarnoun) and chili pepper (felfel).

Vegetables are often used in stews (tagine/jwaz/djwizza) and soups (chorba/harira/jari), or simply fried or steamed.

=== Fish and seafood ===
Sardines, hake, shrimp, octopus, tuna and cod are the main items of seafood commonly eaten in Algerian cuisine, mostly in stews or fried.

=== Spices ===
Many spices are used in Algerian cuisine, including different kinds of dried red chili pepper, caraway, cumin, cinnamon, turmeric, ginger, paprika, coriander, saffron, mace, cloves, fennel, anise, nutmeg, cayenne pepper, fenugreek, and black pepper. Some spice mixes are also traditional to the North African region, such as ras el hanout, which can be made of up to 27 spices. Hror is a spice mix typical of Algerian cuisine mainly made from galangal, cubeb, nutmeg and cinnamon, but recipes may include more spices and herbs such as liquorice or pellitory.

== Dishes ==
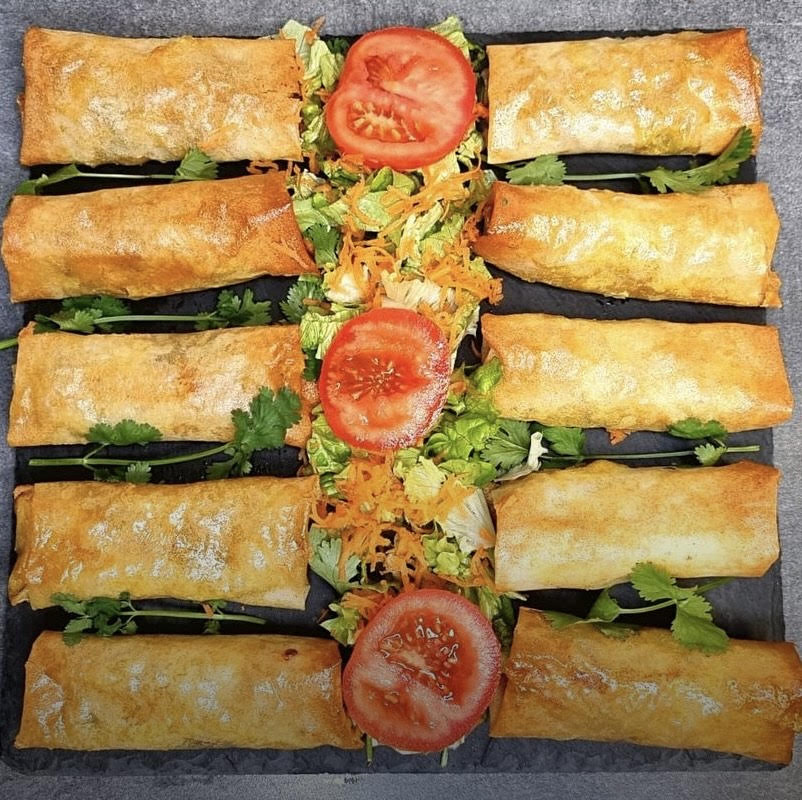
Algerian bourek pastry

=== Starters and appetizers ===
Some small starters can be eaten either before the main dish (traditionally done during Ramadan). These starters are generally soups (most famously chorba) but also include kemia, some small dish of offal (such as liver or kidneys) or carrots with cumin (zorodiyya mcharmla). Some traditional salads such as chlata felfel (a salad of roasted/smoked peppers, tomatoes, onions or scallions and garlic with olive oil and vinegar, generally served cold), zaalouka (ratatouille of eggplants and tomatoes mainly, served hot or cold) or salads made with beets, corn, cucumber, tomatoes and eggs can also be served before a meal.

=== Main dishes ===
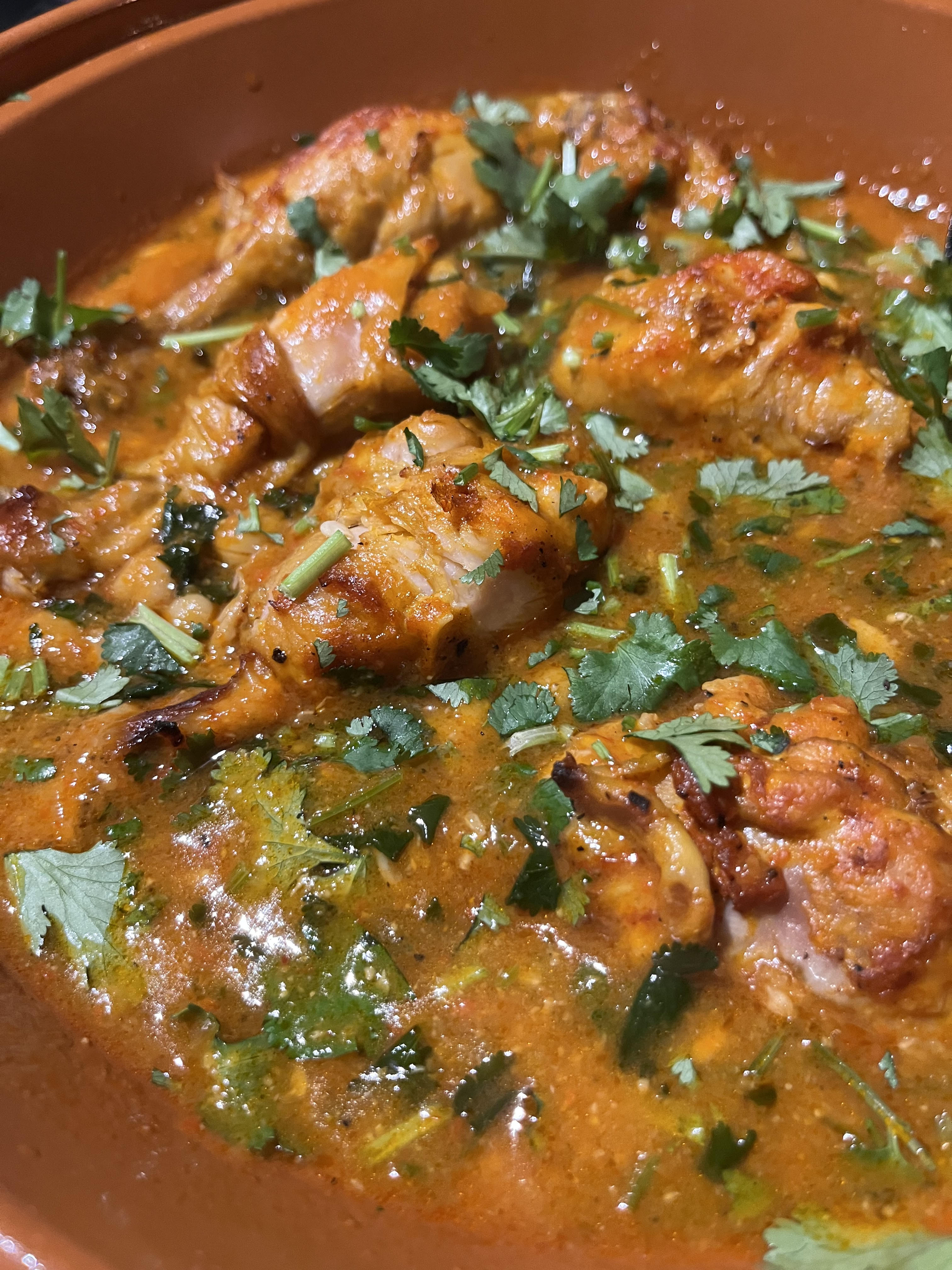
Spicy Algerian chicken chtitha

A common and one of the most favorite dishes of Algerian cuisine is couscous. The semolina is traditionally made from wheat but can also be made with barley. The grains can also be fermented to make el Hammoun couscous. The dish can be prepared in many ways, generally with a sauce with beef or lamb and zucchini, carrots, chickpeas and green bean, chicken, lentils and black-eyed pea. Couscous can also be consumed in a masfouf (or thameqfoult in Kabyle), a dry version with no sauce and vegetables such as broad beans, peas or also with raisins and dates, traditionally along with fermented milk.

Several pasta dishes can be found in the traditional Algerian cuisine: rechta, chakhchoukha, berkoukes, tikourbabine (also called asban), Aftir oukessoul tlitli or trida. These traditional pasta dishes are prepared in a red stew, with the exception of rechta which is generally made in a white stew in Algeria, with meat and vegetables.

Vegetarian dishes in Algeria are also a main part of the diet with karantita (chickpeas flan), tbikha (vegetable stew), shakshouka (sort of ratatouille, often cooked with eggs), zaalouka (ratatouille of eggplants and tomatoes mainly, served hot or cold). These dishes are often consumed with bread.

Tajine or djouez are traditional dishes prepared in a stew or cooked in a similar way, originally in an earthen pot. They can be vegetarian, but are generally made of a meat (either lamb or chicken) and vegetables. Particular tajines made in a red sauce are called chtitha (for example, chtitha djaj is a chicken dish cooked in a red sauce with chickpeas). Other well-known dishes include koubeb (chicken cooked in a white sauce with cinnamon and chickpeas and served with thick fries and parsley), zviti, and marqa bel a'assel (a speciality from Tlemcen).

Some additional dishes include:

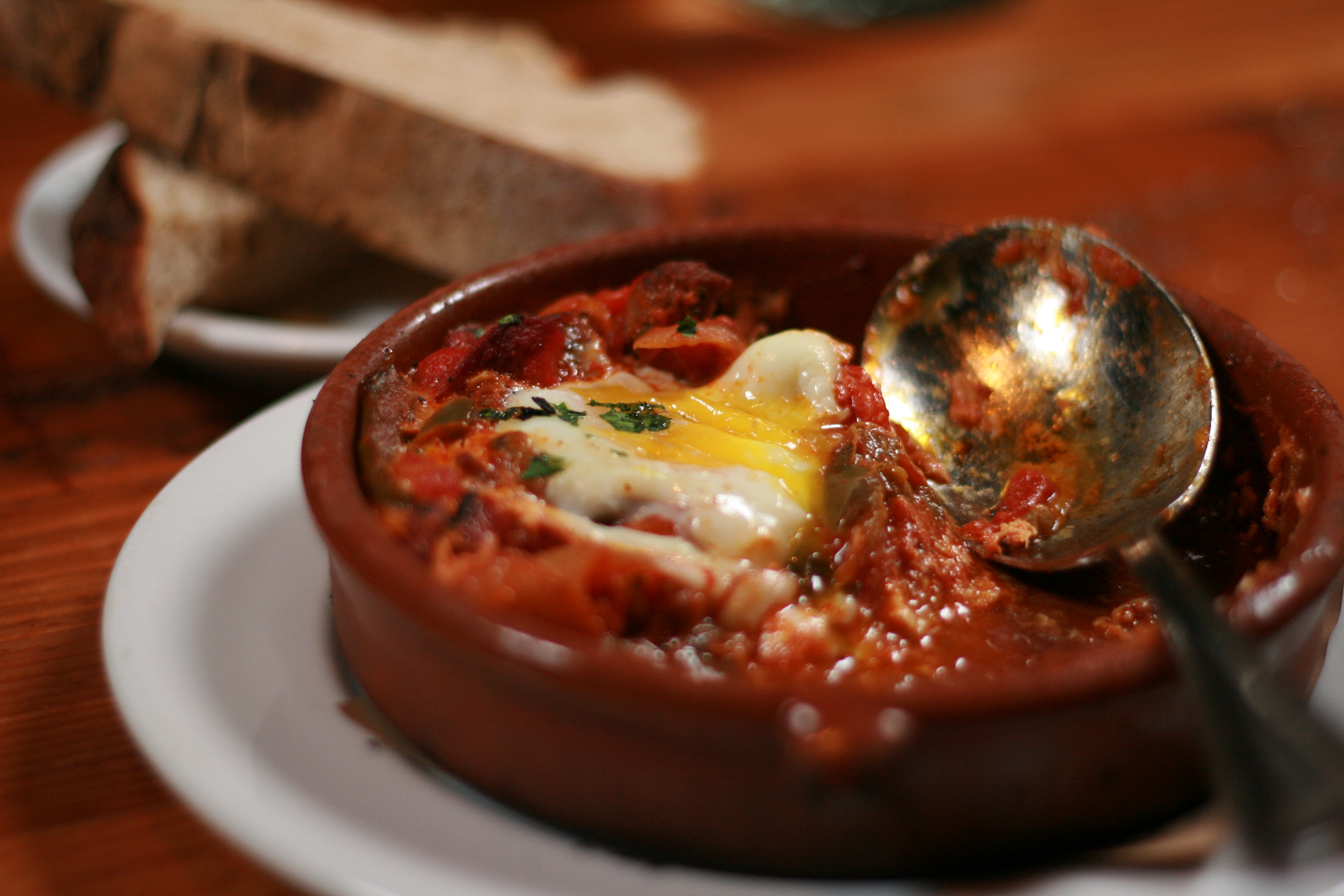
Tchektchouka

- Bourek—fried spring rolls with various stuffing, including meat, tuna, potato, and cheese. A popular variant, the bourek annabi, from Annaba, is bigger and stuffed with mashed potatoes, ground beef, mushrooms, cheese, eggs and parsley.
- Mhadjeb—flatbread stuffed with onions and tomato sauce.
- Shakshouka, chakshoka, shakhshosha—a mixture of onions, tomato, bell peppers, zucchini and eggs. There are many regional versions.
- Chorba frik or jari—a tomato-based soup with lamb.
- Frites-omelette—French fries with eggs.
- Dobara—chickpea soup.
- Dolma—stuffed vegetables cooked in a stock.
- Tajine mtewem—meatballs cooked in a tajine.

=== Soups ===
Algeria has four well-known traditional soups consumed throughout the country: chorba frik (which is also cooked with kadaif in some regions in place of the frik), harira, djari and tchicha. These traditional Algerian soups are served at the beginning of the meal as an entree and are mainly prepared from lamb, mutton or chicken, chickpeas, tomatoes, vermicelli, wheat, spices and different vegetables and legumes. These varied soups are the most popular during the holy month of Ramadan. The gaspacho oranais is an Algerian version of a Manchego dish. The chorba has another variant, the chorba bida (white chorba) which is cooked with chicken, kadaif, chickpeas and pasley without any tomato. It is traditionally eaten with a squeeze of lemon juice.

== Desserts ==
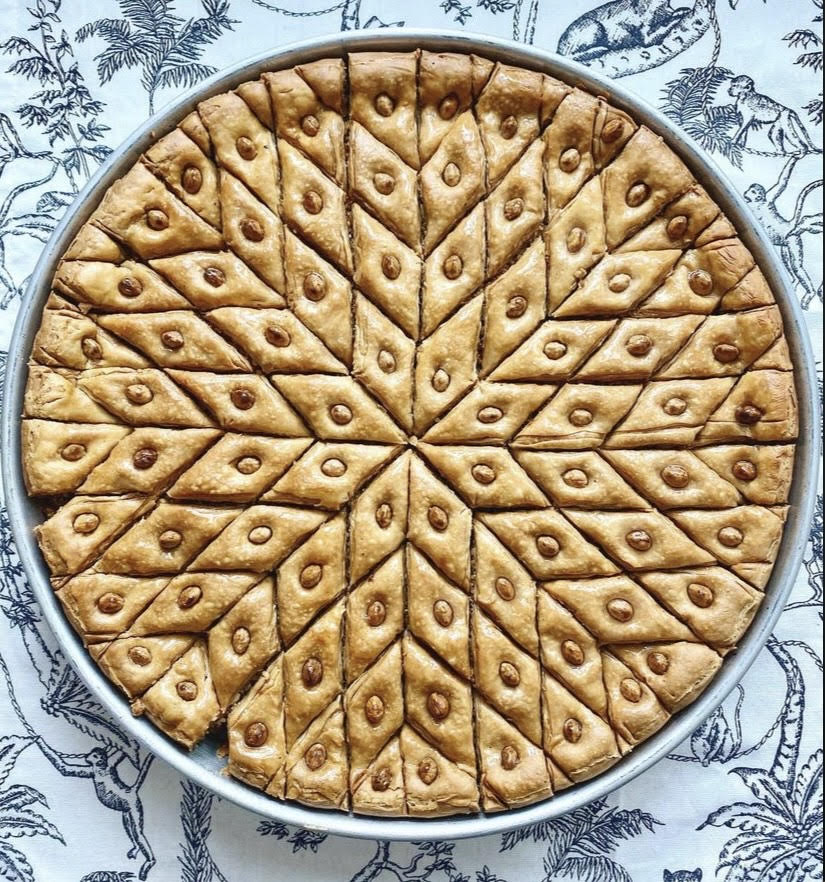
Algerian baklawa

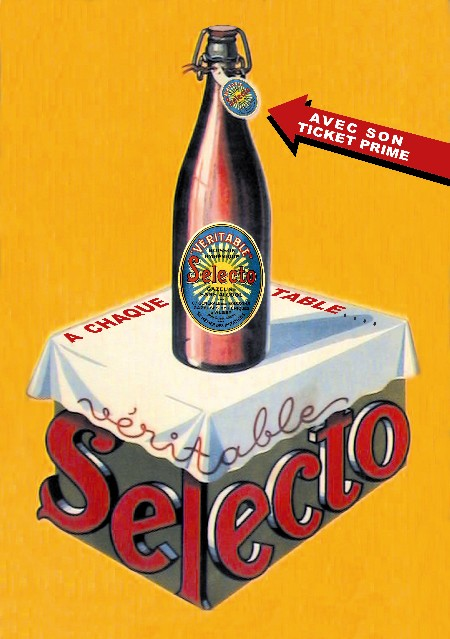
Old advertising poster for Selecto from Hamoud Boualem (1889).

Typically, seasonal fruits are served as a dessert at the end of meals. These fruits include watermelon, loquat, grape, pomegranate or dates (which can also be served at the beginning of the meal).

Common pastries include dziriyat, garn ghzal (similar to gazelle ankles), baqlawa, mhancha, bradj, makroudh, kalb elouz, zlabiya, and griwech (a deep-fried pretzel-shaped dough, soaked in honey and sprinkled with sesame seeds).

Many pastries are prepared for special occasions, such as Eid-al-Fitr and weddings. For example, the mouna was traditionally served by newlywed women to other women during their traditional hammam. The tamina is a kind of paste made with semolina, butter, hror or other spices and honey, usually served after a woman gave birth.

M'semen, sfenj or baghrir are generally served with tea and can be topped with honey, jam or even olive oil and sugar.

Creponne, a sorbet which originated in Oran, is a specialty in Algeria. Other desserts and cakes such as sfenj and kroki mchawcha are also commonly eaten.

== Drinks ==
Green tea with mint is generally drunk in the afternoon and during ceremonies with pastries. When fresh mint is not available, dried leaves can be used instead. Geranium tea can also be prepared with geranium leaves instead of mint. Generally, tea is prepared with green tea leaves, either of the gunpowder blend or chaara sandook (green tea with a lighter taste than the bitter gunpowder blend).

Algerians are heavy coffee consumers; thick espresso and black coffee are very popular, Algerian breakfast consists of a latte coffee with croissants or bread with butter or any Algerian sweets like Algerian baklawa, msemen or baghrir topped with honey or jam. Mazagran, which is said to be the “original iced coffee”, originated in Algeria; it is a cold sweetened coffee drink.

Cherbet mazhar is a traditional beverage drunk during marriages in the northern parts of the country. It is a syrup made with water, sugar and orange flower water (mazhar). Sherbet Miliana is another traditional syrup made from cherries originating from Miliana.

Fruit juice and soft drinks, called gazouz, are common and often drunk daily. The most famous Algerian soda is Hamoud Boualem, an Algerian soft drink manufacturer that makes drinks popular in Algeria and exports them abroad, primarily for consumption by Algerian emigrants. It is one of the country's oldest companies, having been founded in 1878. Their products include sodas like "Selecto," "Hamoud," and "Slim", each in multiple flavors, as well as syrups in different flavors.

Algeria previously produced a large quantity of Algerian wine during the French colonization but production has decreased since its independence. Alcohol consumption is frowned upon in Algeria but is not legally prohibited, which does not prevent the winegrower from producing a wide variety of wines mainly from the slopes of Mascara, Médéa and Tlemcen.

== Sauces and condiments ==
Algerian cuisine is characterized by its use of flavorful spices and herbs, and a variety of sauces play an important role in many dishes. Two popular Algerian sauces are harissa and dersa.

Harissa is a spicy chili paste that is made from dried chili peppers, garlic, olive oil, and various spices such as caraway and coriander. It is often used as a condiment to add heat and flavor to stews, soups, and grilled meats. Harissa can also be used as a marinade for meat or seafood.

Dersa is a milder sauce that is made from garlic, lemon juice, olive oil, and a variety of herbs such as parsley, cilantro, and mint. It is often used as a dipping sauce for bread, vegetables, or grilled meats. Dersa can also be used as a marinade or dressing for salads.

Zaalouk: a traditional dip used in Algeria made from eggplant, tomatoes, garlic, and spices, typically served as an appetizer or side dish.

Chermoula, a marinade made from garlic, cilantro, lemon juice, and spices, commonly used to flavor seafood and meat dishes.

Toum: a garlic sauce made from garlic, lemon juice, and olive oil, similar to aioli, often served with grilled meats or as a dip.

Shakshuka sauce: a spicy tomato sauce made with onions, peppers, and a variety of spices, often used in the popular egg dish of the same name.

Hmiss is another popular condiment in Algerian cuisine. It is a spicy tomato sauce made from roasted red peppers, tomatoes, garlic, olive oil, and chili peppers. Hmiss is usually served as a dip or spread with bread or grilled meat, and it can also be used as a topping for sandwiches or pizza. The roasted red peppers give hmiss a smoky flavor, while the chili peppers add heat, making it a flavorful and spicy condiment. In some parts of Algeria, hmiss is also made with the addition of spices such as cumin and paprika, giving it a unique regional variation.

== Bread ==
Between 1976 and 1984, the average Algerian family spent around 56% of their income on food and drink, of which 10% was spent on bread and other cereal products. Bread is thought to contain God's blessing, baraka. It is traditionally seen as a symbol of life and functions in rituals symbolic of life, fertility and abundance.

=== Types of breads ===
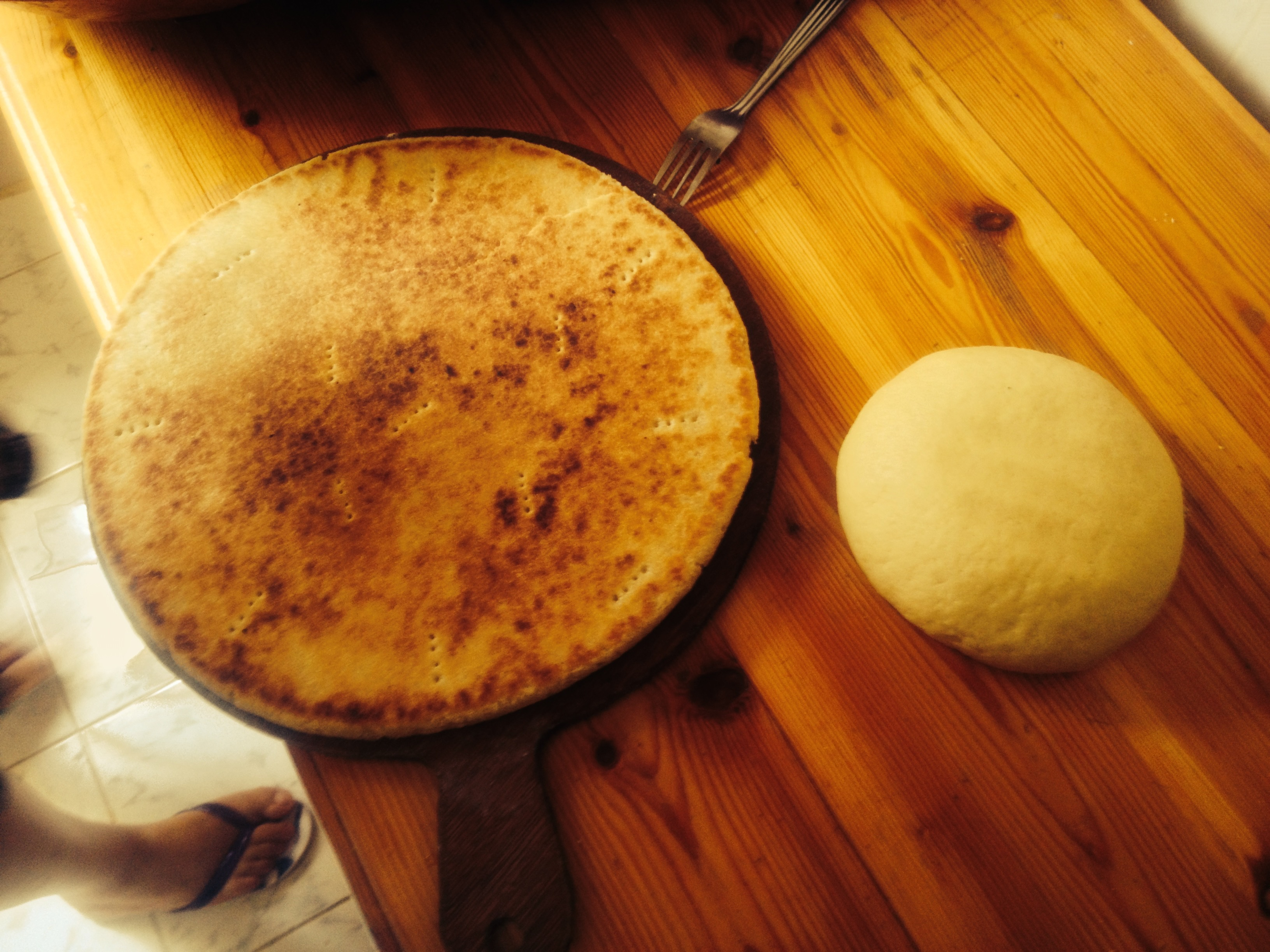
Algerian bread

Khubz as-dâr—wheat flour, water, salt and yeast. Traditionally flat and round, a few centimeters thick, made at home and commonly baked in a gas oven or communal oven.

Khubz at-tajîn or matlû—wheat semolina, yeast, water and salt. Flattened pan-bread (French: galette), baked in a previously heated earthenware or cast-iron plate on a fire. Variations are made by the quality of the leavening agent, by adding barley or sorghum, bran, or by making it corn-based.

Khubz-ftir, raqâq, rfîs or tarîd—well-kneaded, unleavened dough, baked for half a minute on a convex sheet of brass or iron, balanced on stones over a fire. This is a preferred method for those living nomadic lives due to easy transportation of the pan and the small amount of fuel necessary.

Batbout is a small bread resembling Greek pita bread, but thicker (similar to matlû). It is eaten with stuffing inside.

French baguettes—white, leavened wheat flour. Bought at bakery or street vendor, but never made at home due to access to mills powered by electricity. Power shortages prevent consumption of this bread, and often Algerians turn to home-made breads that are milled by women's hands.

=== Algerian bread ===
French bread tends to be given more value in terms of taste and quality in that it was commonly associated to being more suitable to higher standards. However, the white inner parts of a baguette are thought to be unhealthy and will regularly be thrown away, and the bread is frequently associated with constipation.

Algerian breads, on the other hand, are considered more nutritive, rich and tasteful and seldom go to waste. Because French breads harden over night or become chewy when put away in plastic bags, it is hard to find usage for them, so they are thrown away with more frequency than Algerian breads that can be reheated or reutilized as edible food utensils or even bird feed.

In the context of rituals, only Algerian bread is thought suitable. Breads offered to guests should be homemade, as it signifies the essence, intimacy, and qualities of the family. In daily practices, it is also a sign of wealth and affluence if one has extra bread at the table, and making bread at home can be considered a sign of familial economic independence.

== Gallery ==
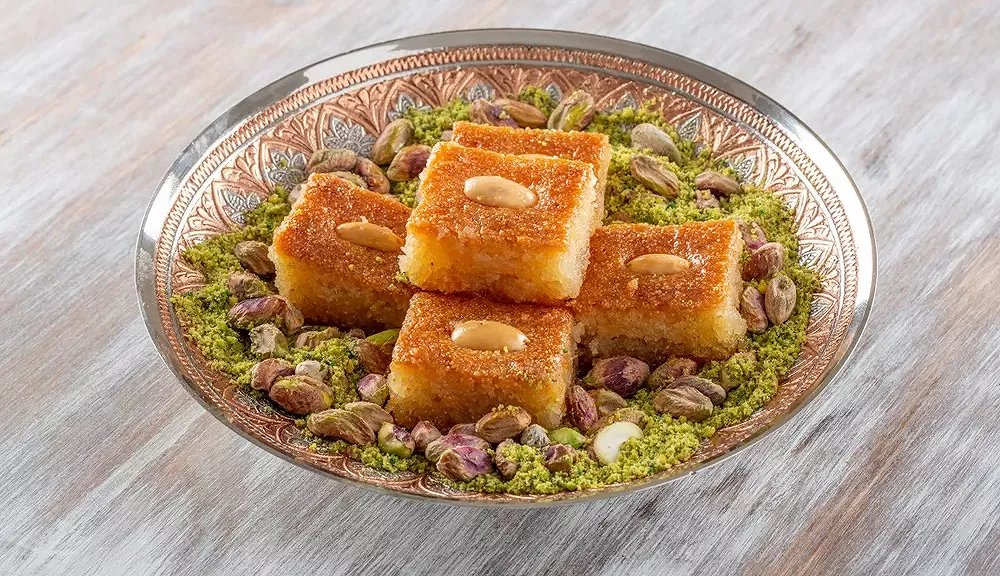
Kalb el Louz, a popular Algerian dessert

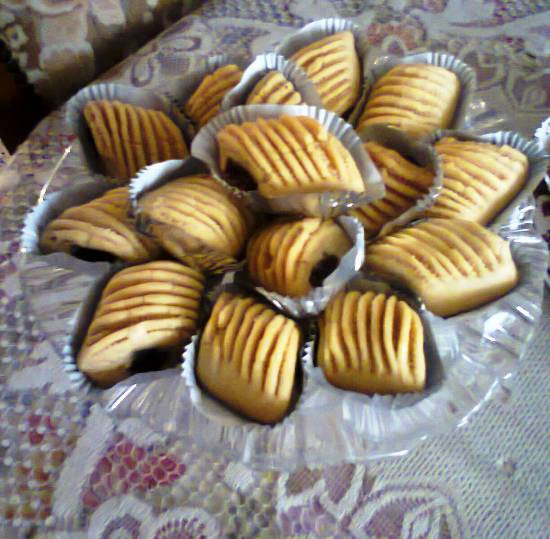
Algerian makroud

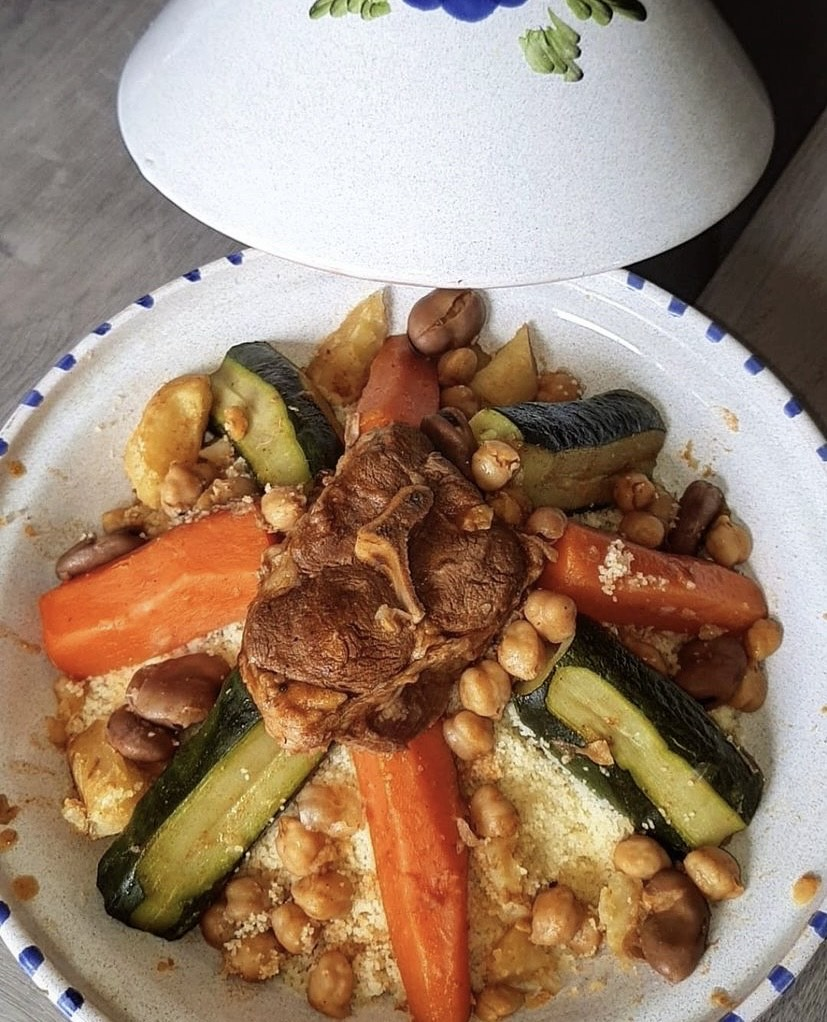
Algerian couscous from Kabylia

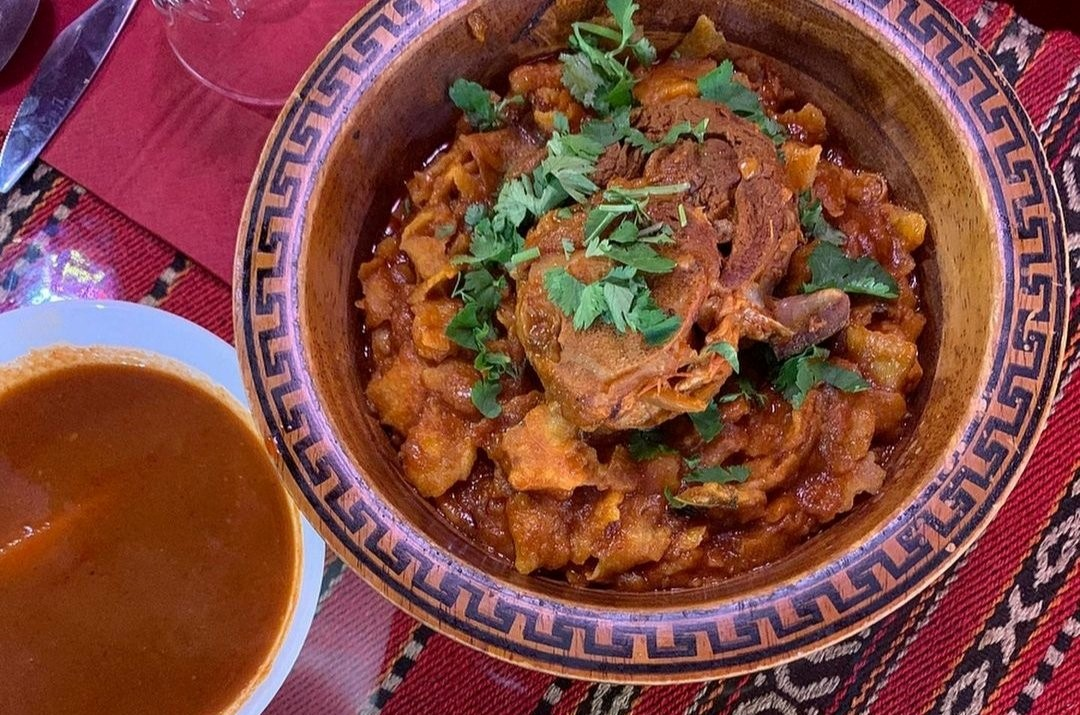
Algerian chakhchoukha from the city of Biskra

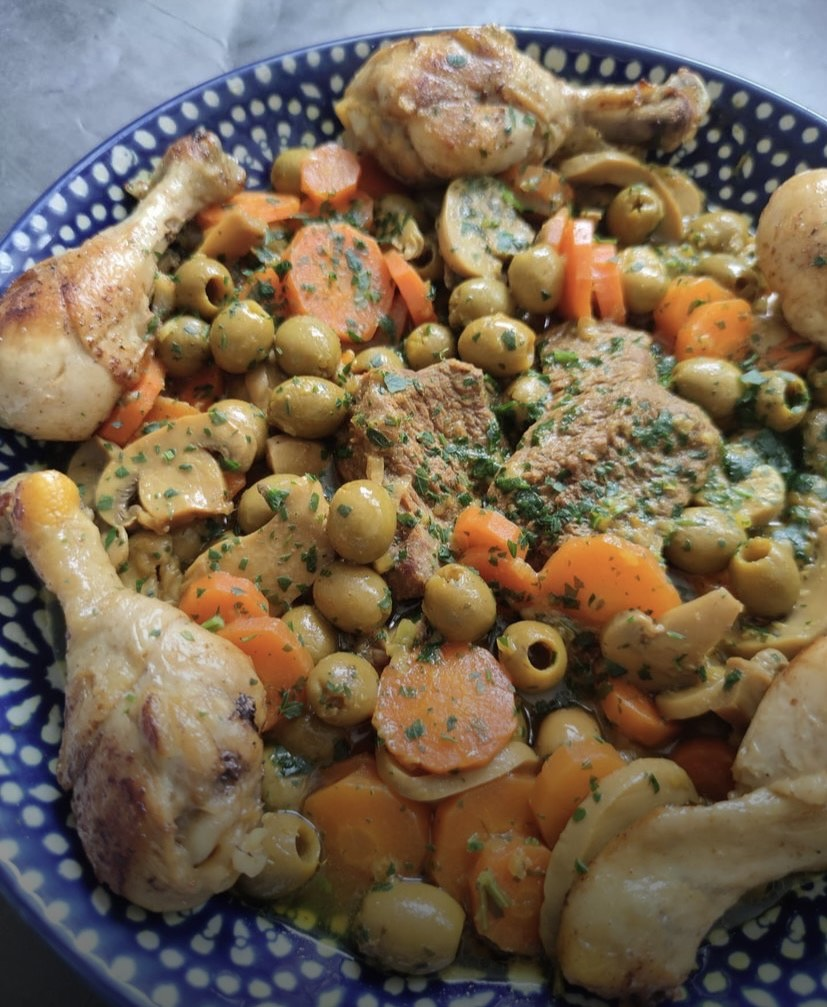
Traditional Algerian olive tagine with chicken and mushrooms

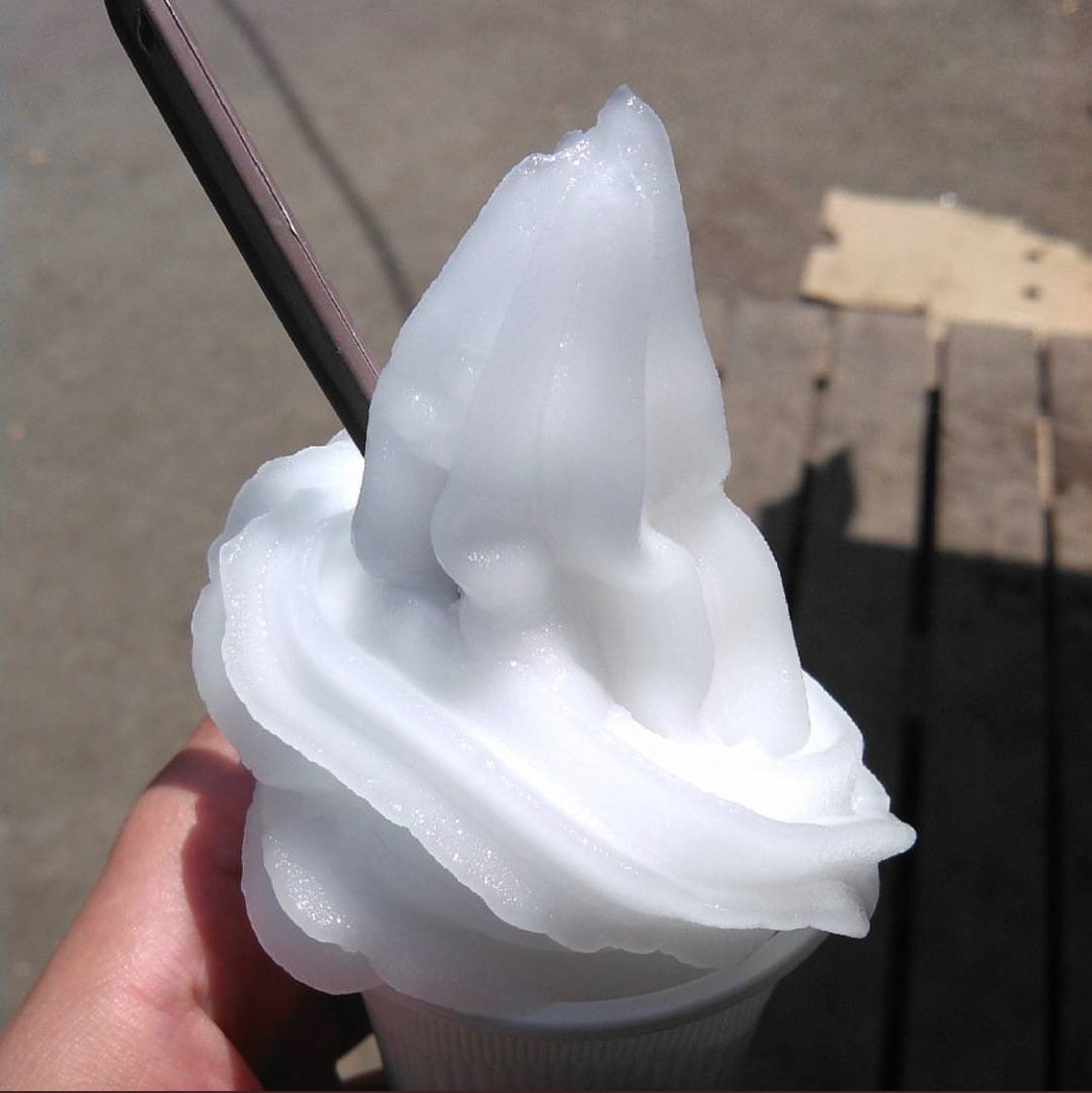
Creponne, a specialty in Algeria

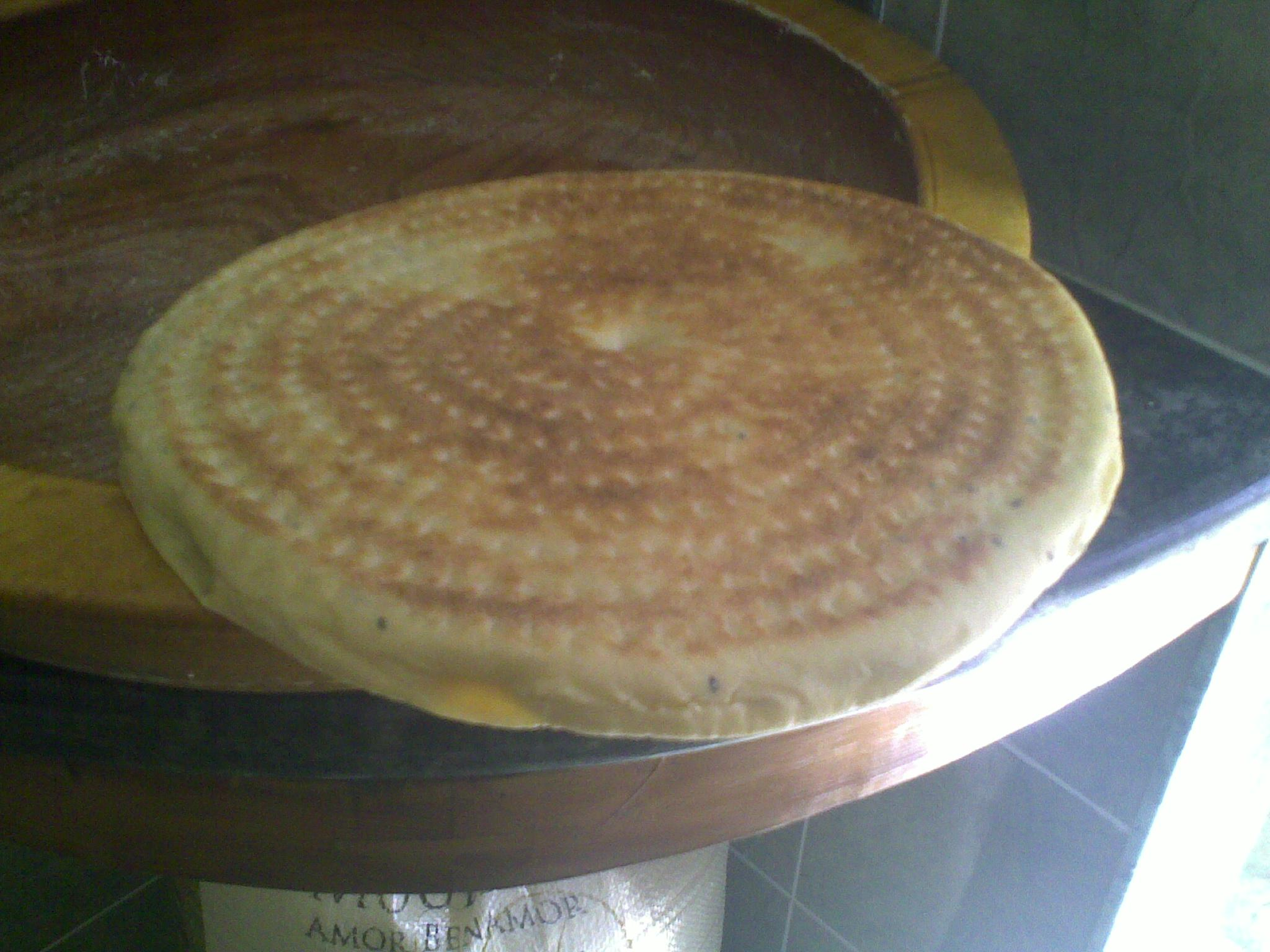
Algerian home-made bread

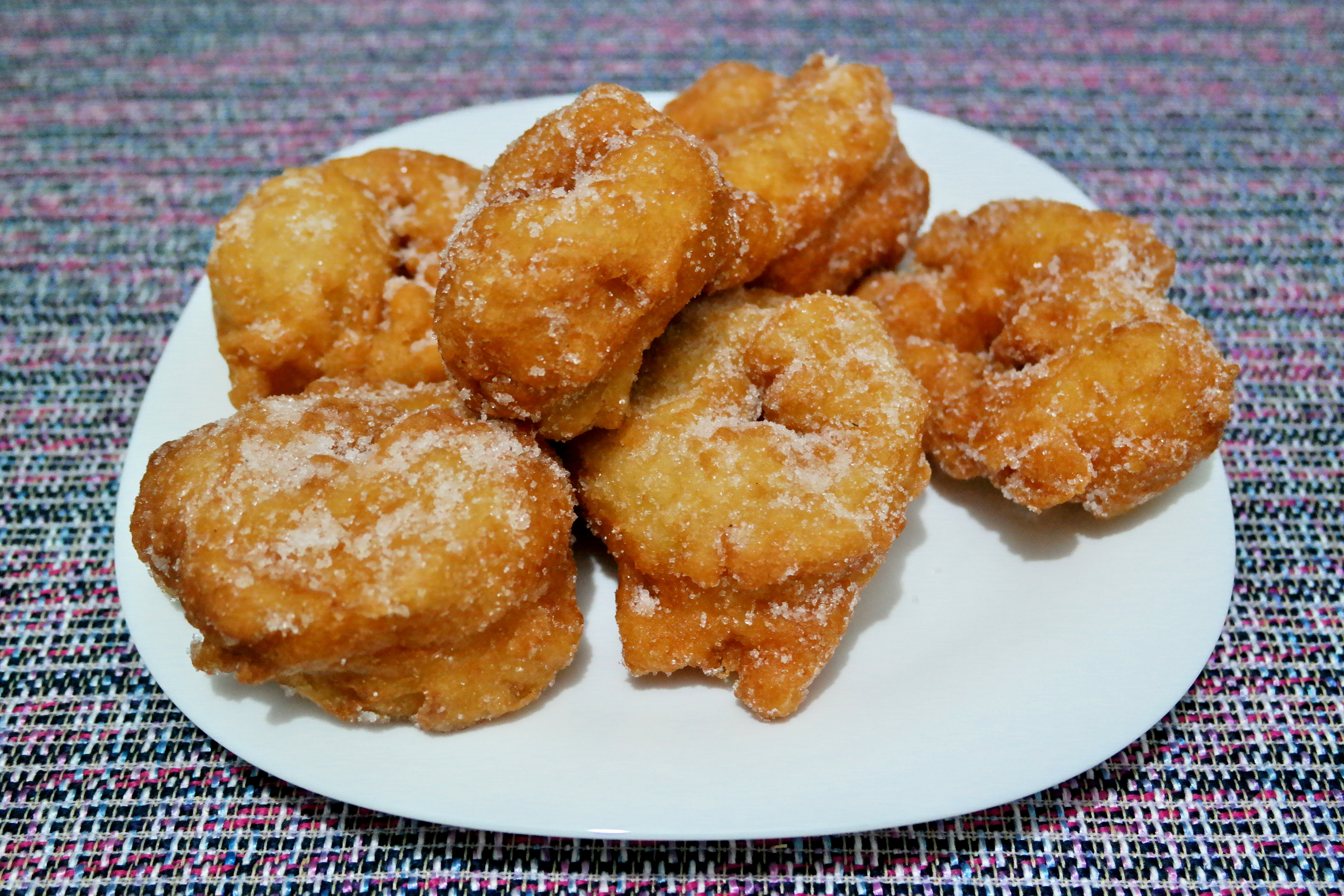
Algerian sfenj

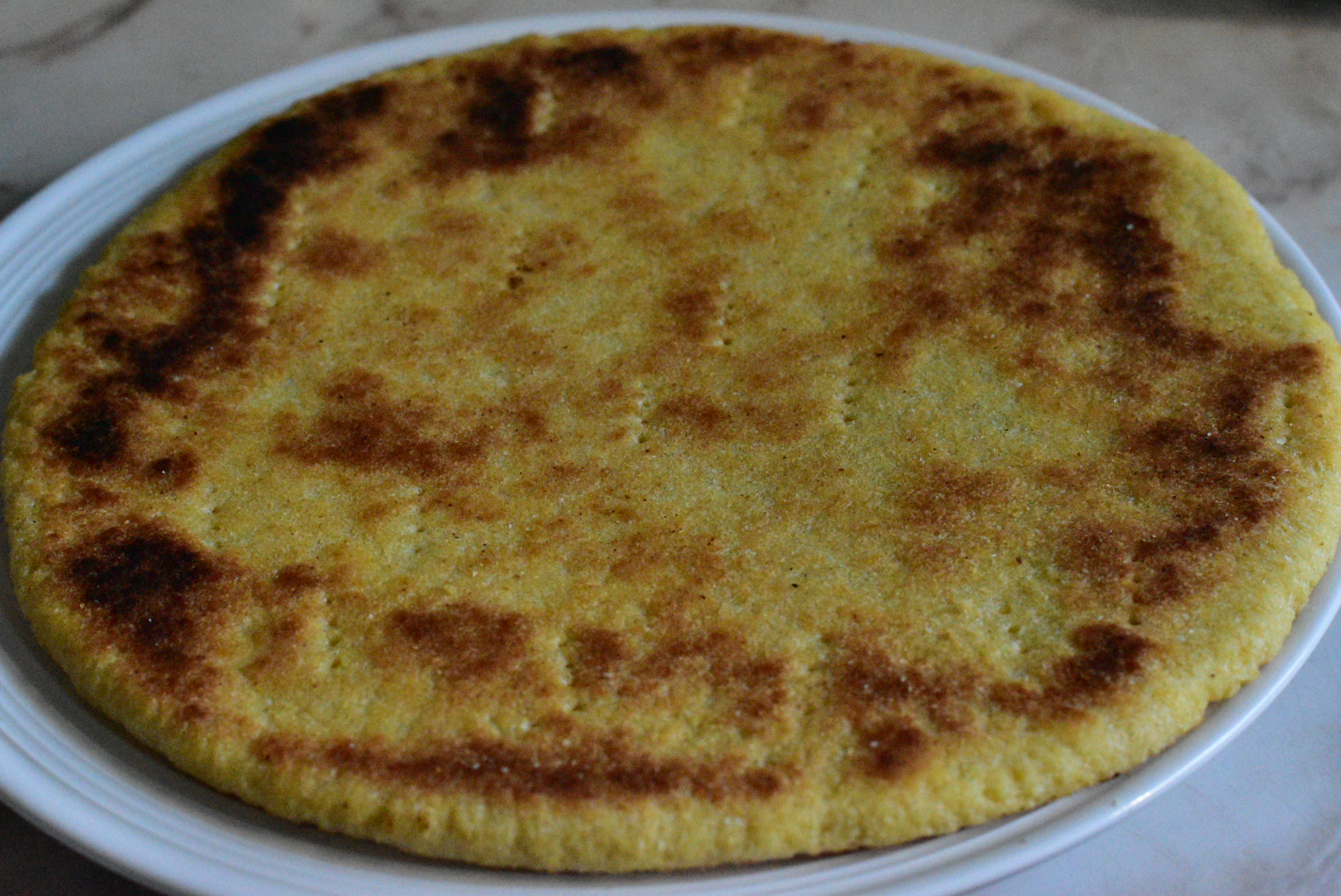
Kesra

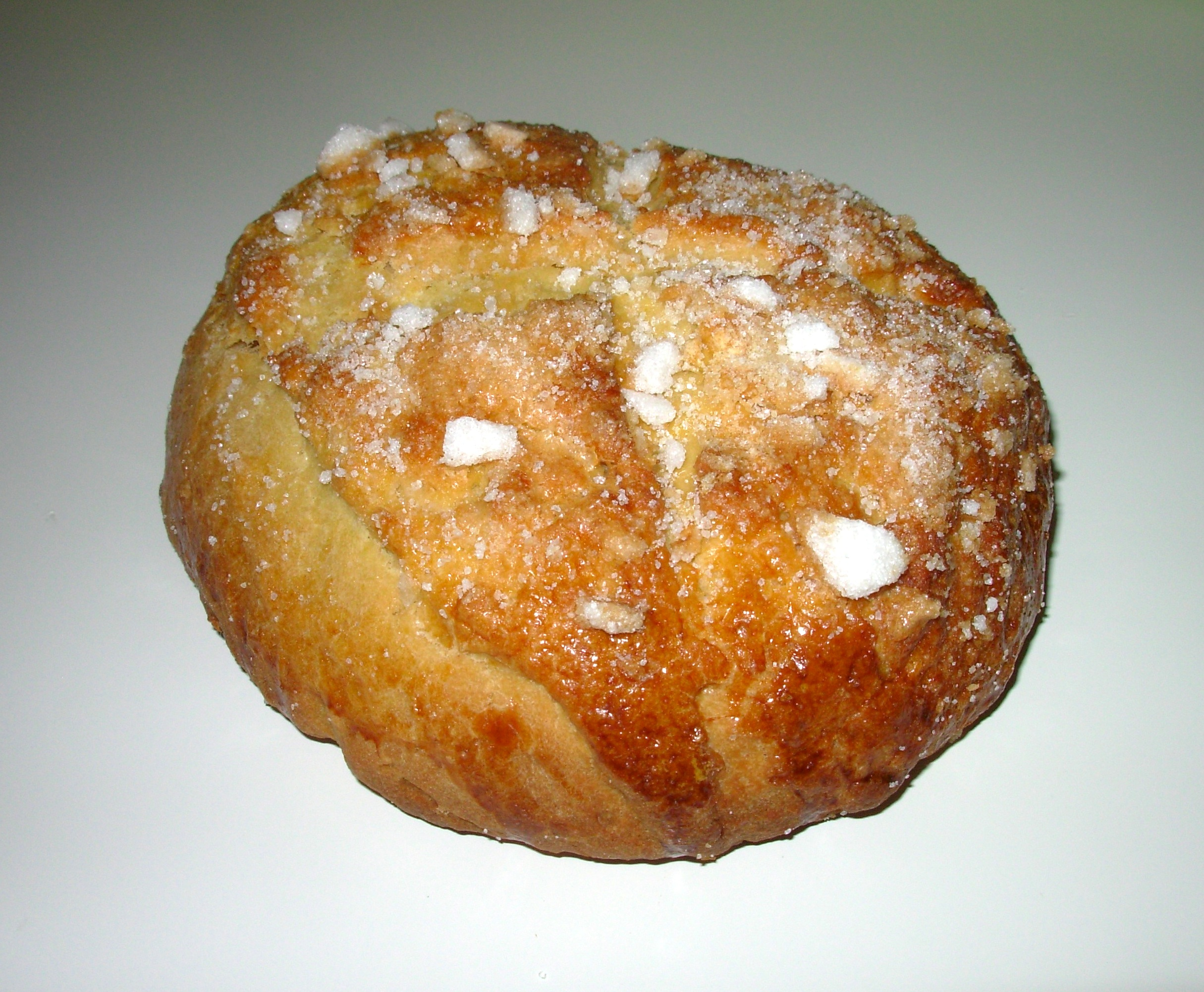
Mouna, sweet bread of Algerian origin

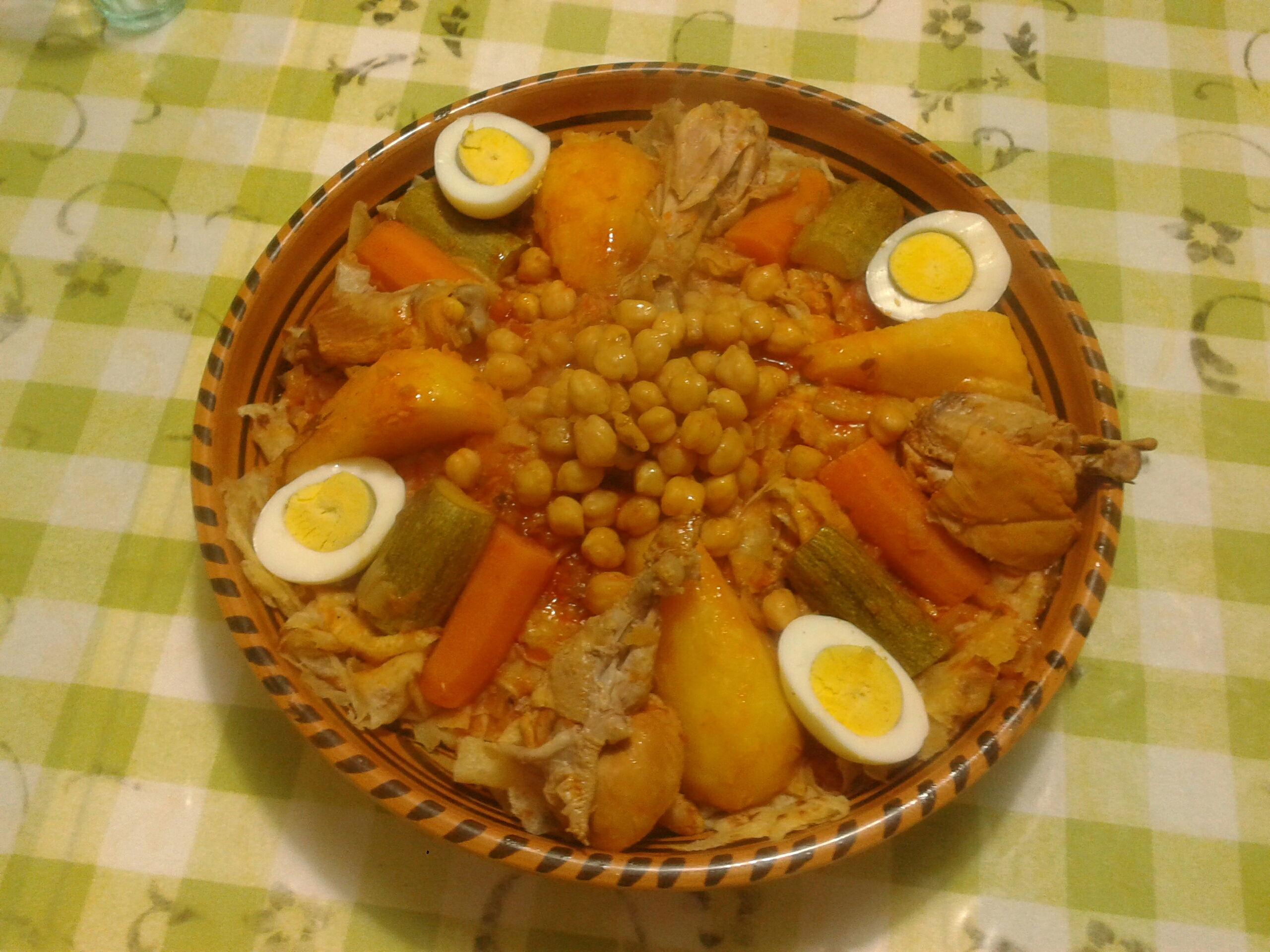
Algerian rogag

== See also ==
- Arab cuisine
- Berber cuisine
- Mediterranean cuisine
- North African cuisine
- List of African cuisines
