= Dobara (Algerian dish) =

Stew

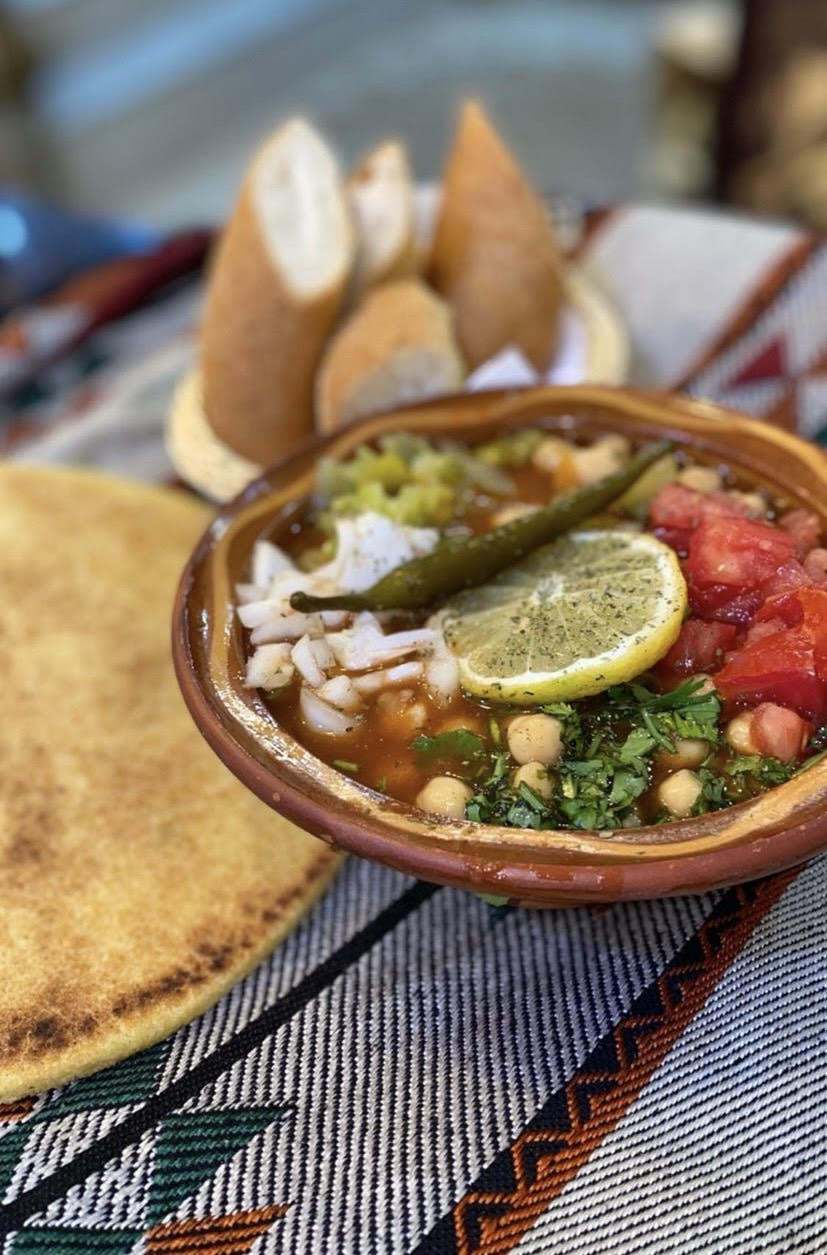
- Dobara served with bread, in Algiers, Algeria.
- Alternative names: Dobara soup, Doubara
- Course: Main course, side dish
- Place of origin: Algeria
- Main ingredients: Chickpeas
- Similar dishes: Zviti

Dobara is a spicy vegetarian Algerian soup, prepared with chickpeas and broad beans and drizzled with olive oil. Originally from the city of Biskra in Algeria, it is generally consumed in winter in the east of the country, notably in El Oued, Batna, Khenchela, Aïn M'lila, Constantine and Djelfa.

== History ==
Dobara was created prior to the commencement of the Algerian conflict, and it later became the meal of Algerian guerrillas.

Its consumption grew from the Zibans and Aurès area to Batna, then to An M'lila and Constantine, as well as to other Algerian cities.

== Variations ==
There are several types of dobara: hot or cold, and the ingredients might vary depending on the region.
