= Batata kbab =

بطاطا كباب
- Alternative names: Batata koucha (بطاطا كوشة)
- Place of origin: Algiers
- Associated cuisine: Algerian
- Main ingredients: Potatoes; Chickpeas
- Ingredients generally used: Chicken; Lamb; Cinnamon; Parsley; Eggs

Batata kbab (Arabic: بطاطا كباب, baṭāṭā kbāb), also known as batata koucha (Arabic: بطاطا كوشة, baṭāṭā kūsha), is a traditional Algerian dish originating from the city of Algiers.

== Origin and etymology ==
Batata kbab originates from Algiers, the capital of Algeria. The name comes from the urban Arabic dialect traditionally spoken in Algiers and can be understood as "potatoes prepared in the style of kebab".

== Description ==
Batata kbab is made with fries and chickpeas, which are cooked in a fragrant white sauce and seasoned with cinnamon and fresh parsley. It is traditionally prepared with chicken or lamb, with potatoes and chickpeas forming the main components of the dish. Some recipes also call for eggs to be added to the sauce, to give it a thicker, richer consistency.

The dish is particularly popular during Ramadan, when it is commonly served as part of the evening meal (iftar) after the daily fast.
