= Chtitha =

Dish in Algerian cuisine

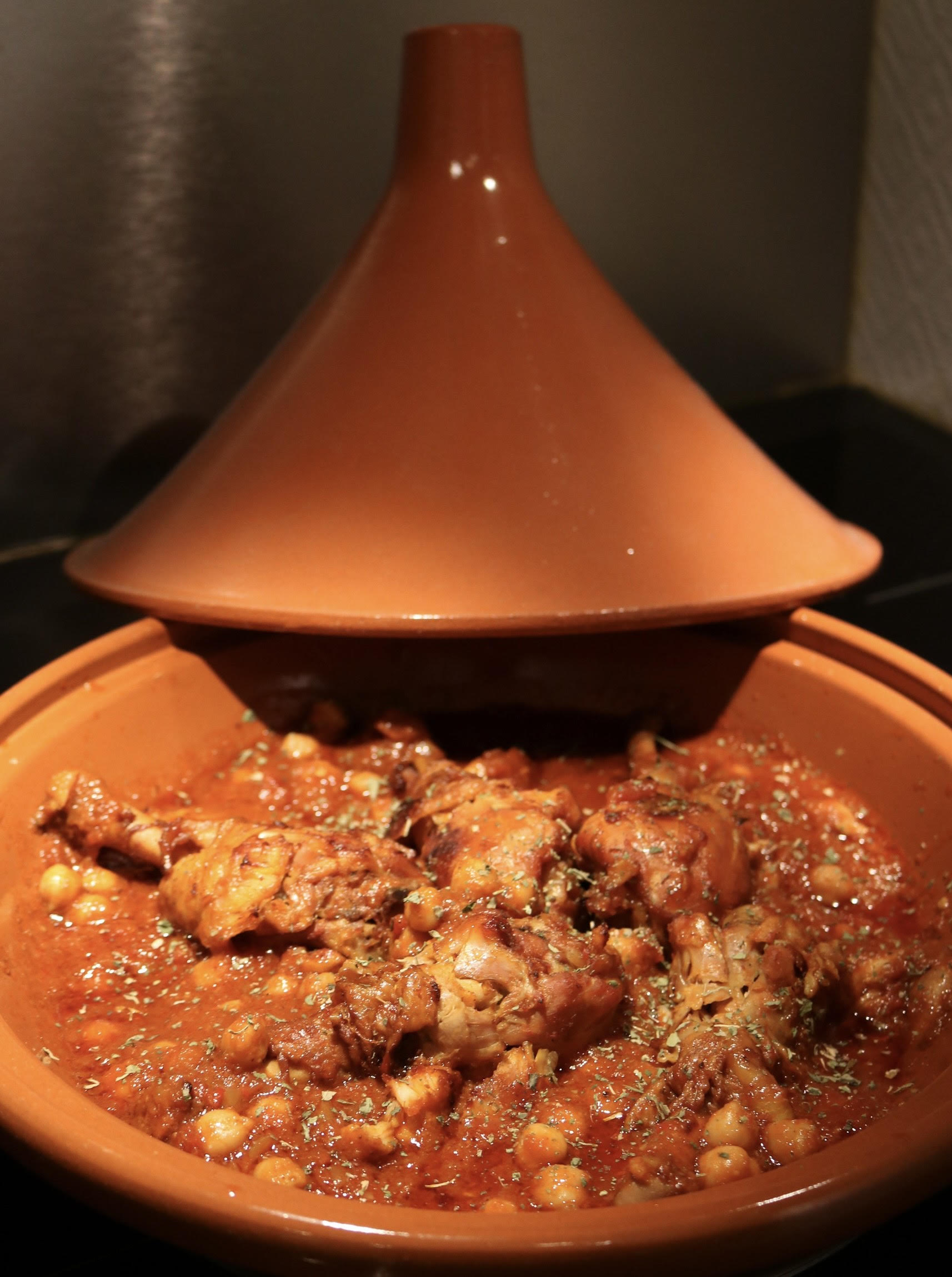
- Algerian chicken chtitha cooked in a tajine pot
- Alternative names: Chtit'ha, Shtitha
- Course: Main course
- Place of origin: Algeria
- Main ingredients: Meat

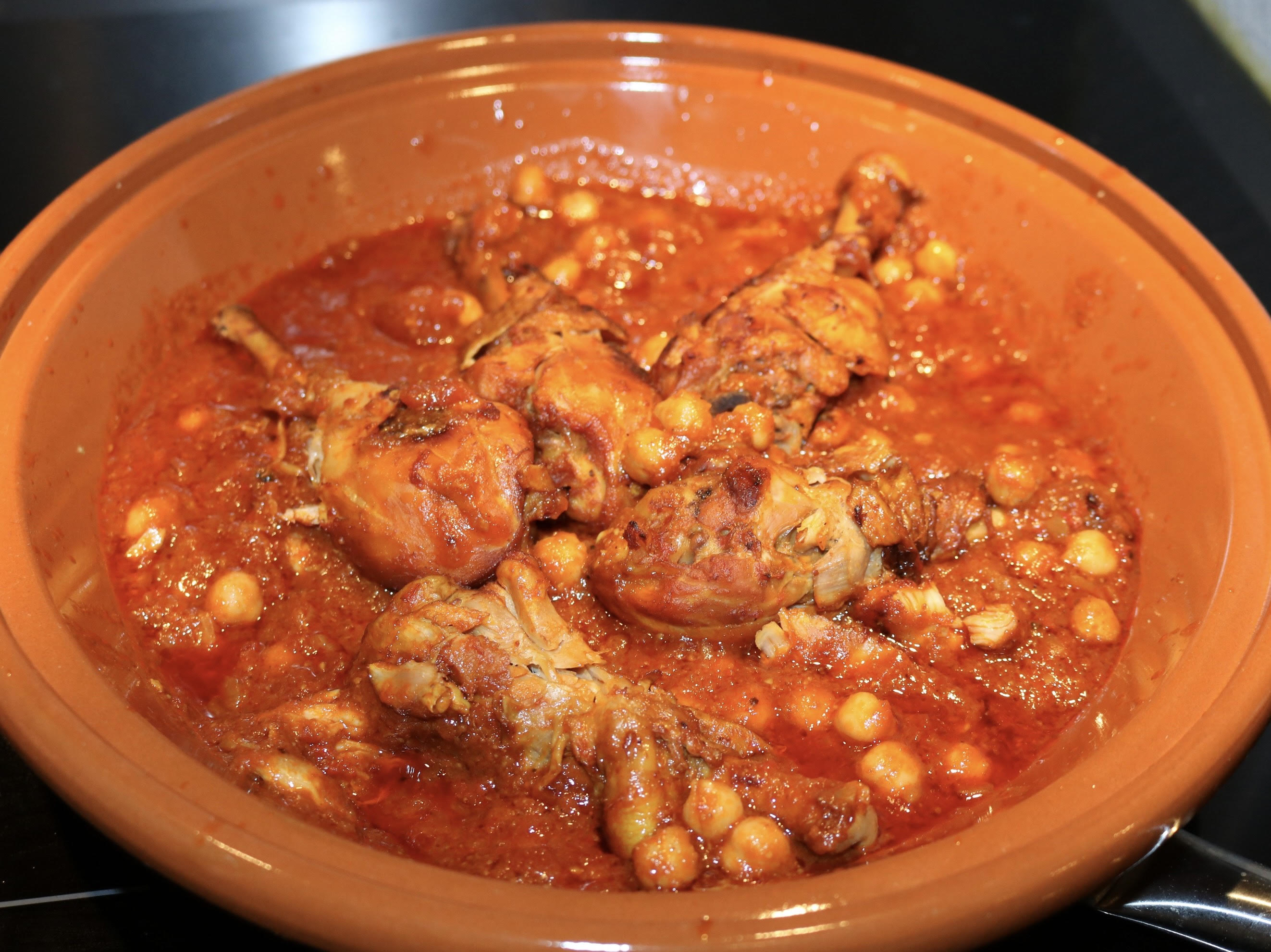
Chicken chtitha

Chtitha (Arabic: شطيطحة) is a family of dishes in Algerian cuisine, originally of the tajine type, with a base consisting of a sauce made of chickpeas and meat, mostly chicken cooked in a red sauce, heavily seasoned with the Algerian condiment derssa, and the meat is ideally marinated in it for a few hours beforehand

It is named chtitha, which translates to 'little dance,' indicative of its spiciness.

The chtitha comes in about ten different dishes, each featuring a specific central ingredient. The intricate combination of spices and aromatic herbs is tailored to each ingredient, imparting a unique flavor to each chtitha.

== Variants ==
- Chtitha djedj, with chicken
- Chtitha lhem, with meat
- Chtitha qamroune, with shrimp
- Chtitha batata besselq, with potatoes and spinach
- Chtitha bel bid, with eggs
- Chtitha batata fliou, requiring the same recipe as chtitha batata besselq, replacing spinach with pennyroyal mint
- Chtitha mokh, with sheep's brain
- Chtitha bouzellouf, with sheep's head
- Chtitha sardine, with sardines
