= Mchawcha =

Algerian food item

- Type: Cake
- Place of origin: Algeria

Mchawcha is a traditional Algerian Kabyle cake that is often drizzled with honey.

Mchawcha is a sweet thick cake that originates from Algeria. The recipe is simple and it is quick to make, it is often drizzled with honey.

== See also ==
- Algerian cuisine
