= Harira =

Soup of Maghrebi and Sephardic cuisines

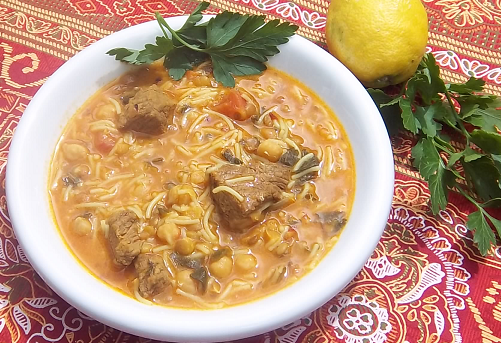
- Harira
- Type: Soup
- Region or state: Morocco; Algeria
- Main ingredients: Flour, tomatoes, lentils, chickpeas, onions, rice or vermicelli, meat (beef, lamb, or chicken), olive oil

Harira (Arabic: الحريرة, romanized: al-ḥarīra) is a traditional North African soup prepared in Morocco and Algeria with many variations, the best-known being Moroccan harira. Harira is popular as a starter, and is also eaten on its own as a light snack. It is mostly served during Ramadan, although it can be made throughout the year.

It is also part of a wider Maghrebi cuisine, where lemon juice and egg are added.

The origin of harira is disputed. While Jewish food historian Gil Marks attributes its origin to Morocco, this claim is not universally accepted. Harira is also a longstanding part of Algerian cuisine, particularly in western Algeria. Algérie Poste describes harira as an authentic Algerian dish Algerian dish of Andalusian origin and identifies it as one of the best-known dishes of Morocco and western Algeria, where it is traditionally associated with Ramadan.

== Preparation ==
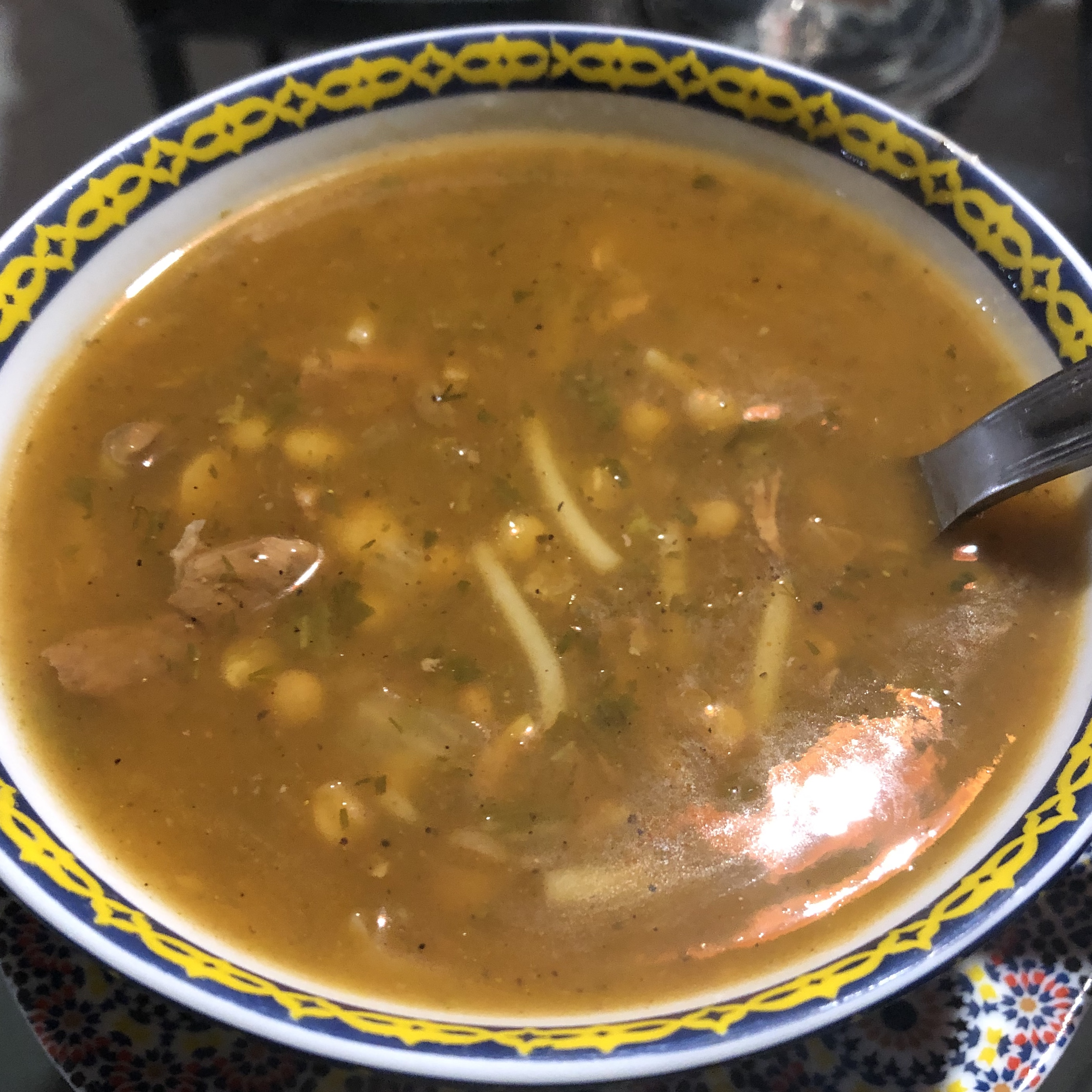
A bowl of harira served in Casablanca

Moroccan Harira's base recipe is composed of the following ingredients, and may vary depending on regions:

- Tadouira – a thickening agent made from flour and water, and sometimes canned tomato paste, which is added at the end of the cooking process.
- Tomatoes and tomato concentrate.
- Lentils.
- Chickpeas.
- Fava beans.
- Onions.
- Rice or broken vermicelli.
- Small amount of meat (beef, lamb or chicken).
- A spoonful or two of olive oil.

The stock, usually of lamb, is well-seasoned with cinnamon, ginger, turmeric or another coloring agent like saffron, and fresh herbs such as cilantro and parsley.

Lemon juice can also be added upon serving. The soup also tastes best after having been allowed to rest overnight.

It is usually served with hardboiled eggs sprinkled with salt and cumin, dates and other favorite dried fruits like figs, traditional honey sweets, and other homemade special breads or crepes.

== See also ==
- List of African dishes
- Moroccan cuisine
- Algerian cuisine
- Tunisian cuisine
- Libyan cuisine
- Maghrebi cuisine
- List of soups
