= Tajine mtewem =

Algerian meal

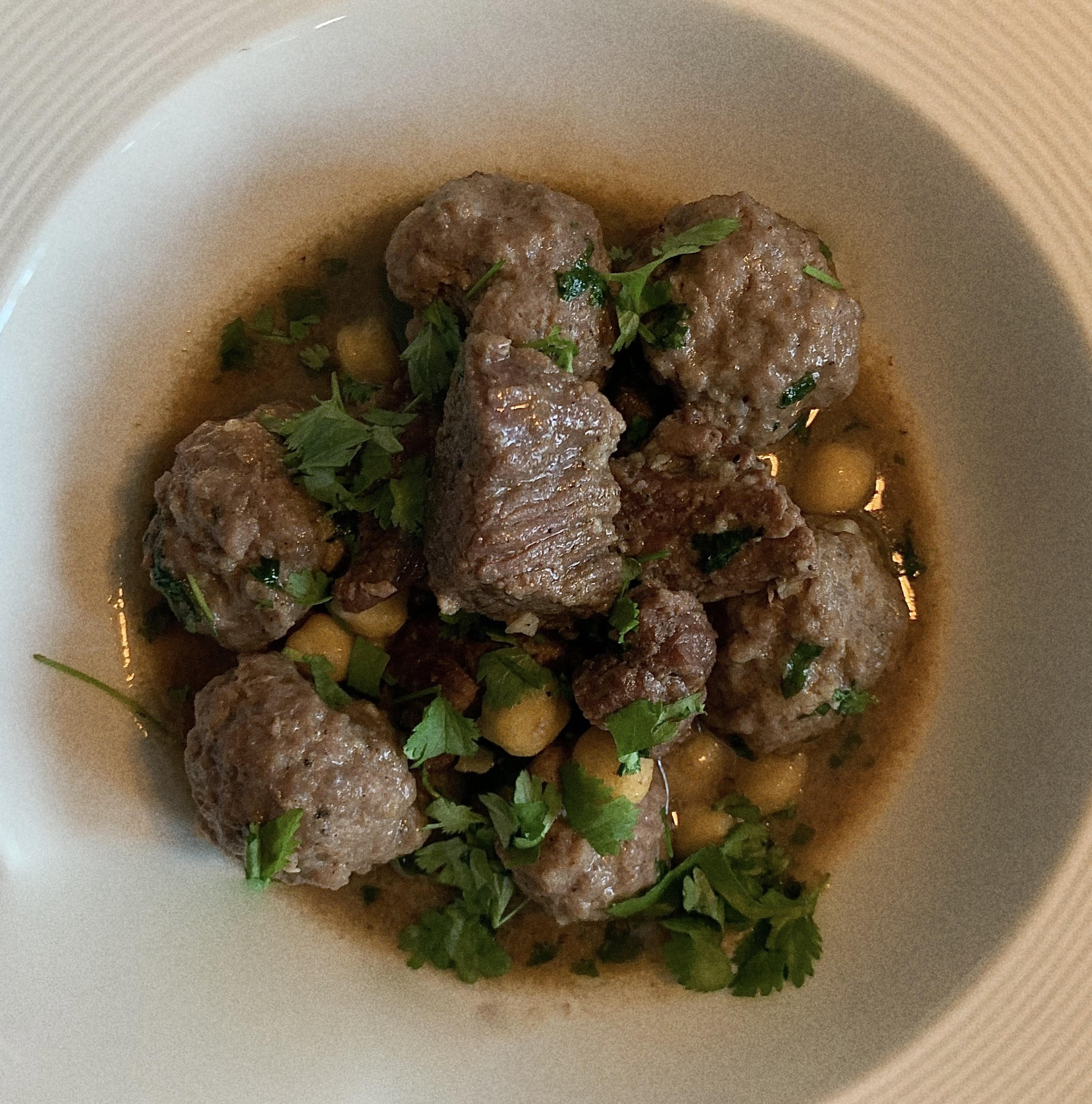
- Algerian tajine mtewem with beef and meatballs
- Alternative names: Tagine mtewem, mtewem
- Place of origin: Algeria
- Region or state: Algiers
- Serving temperature: Hot
- Similar dishes: Tajine kefta

Tajine mtewem, usually abbreviated to mtewem (Arabic: طاجين مثوم), is a traditional Algerian dish, and more specifically Algerine (from the city of Algiers). It is made from minced meatballs, pieces of chicken or lamb meat, garlic, chickpeas and almonds. Its sauce is prepared with a grated onion and a lot of garlic ("mtewem" means “with garlic") and is usually cooked in a tajine pot. Like most Algerian dishes, it is usually served with either a white or red spicy sauce.

== Gallery ==
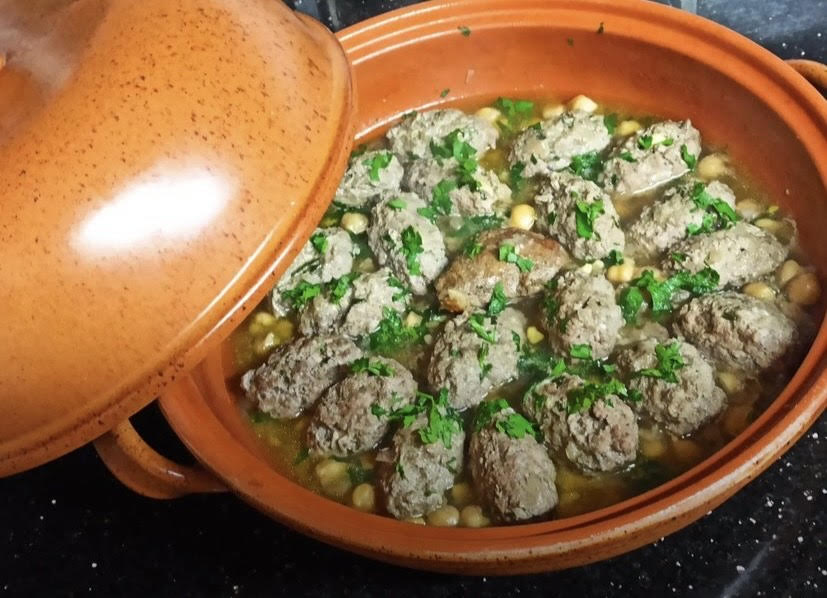
Traditional Algerian tajine mtewem made with white sauce and served in a tajine pot

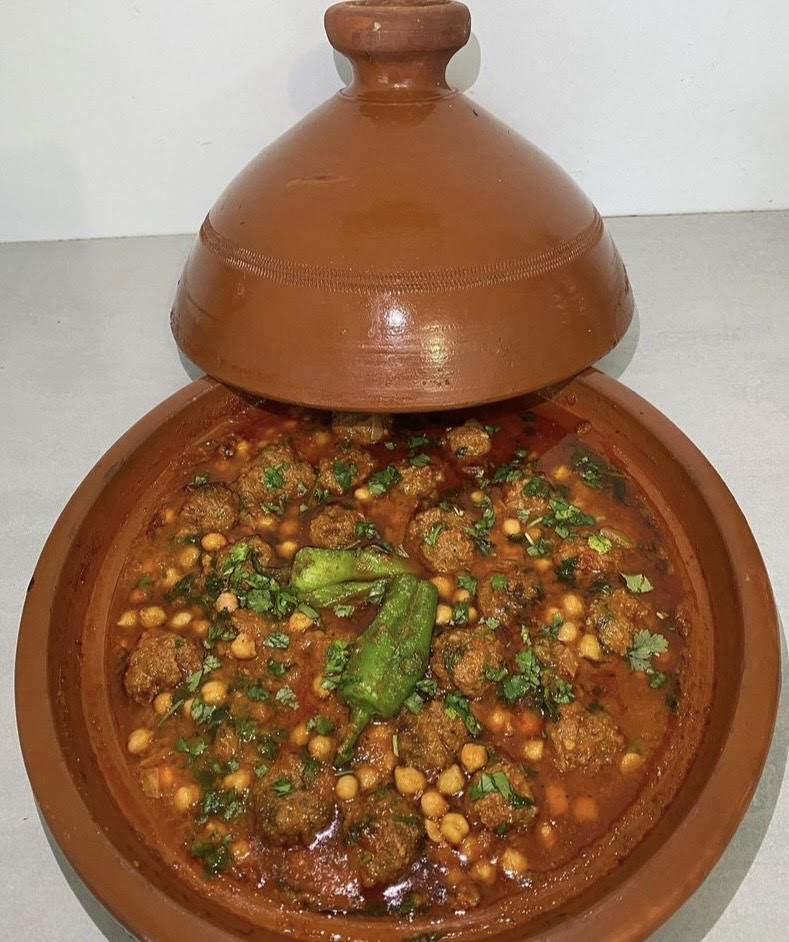
Traditional Algerian tajine mtewem served in a tajine pot in Algiers, Algeria
