= Chorba frik =

Traditional soup prepared in Algeria and Tunisia

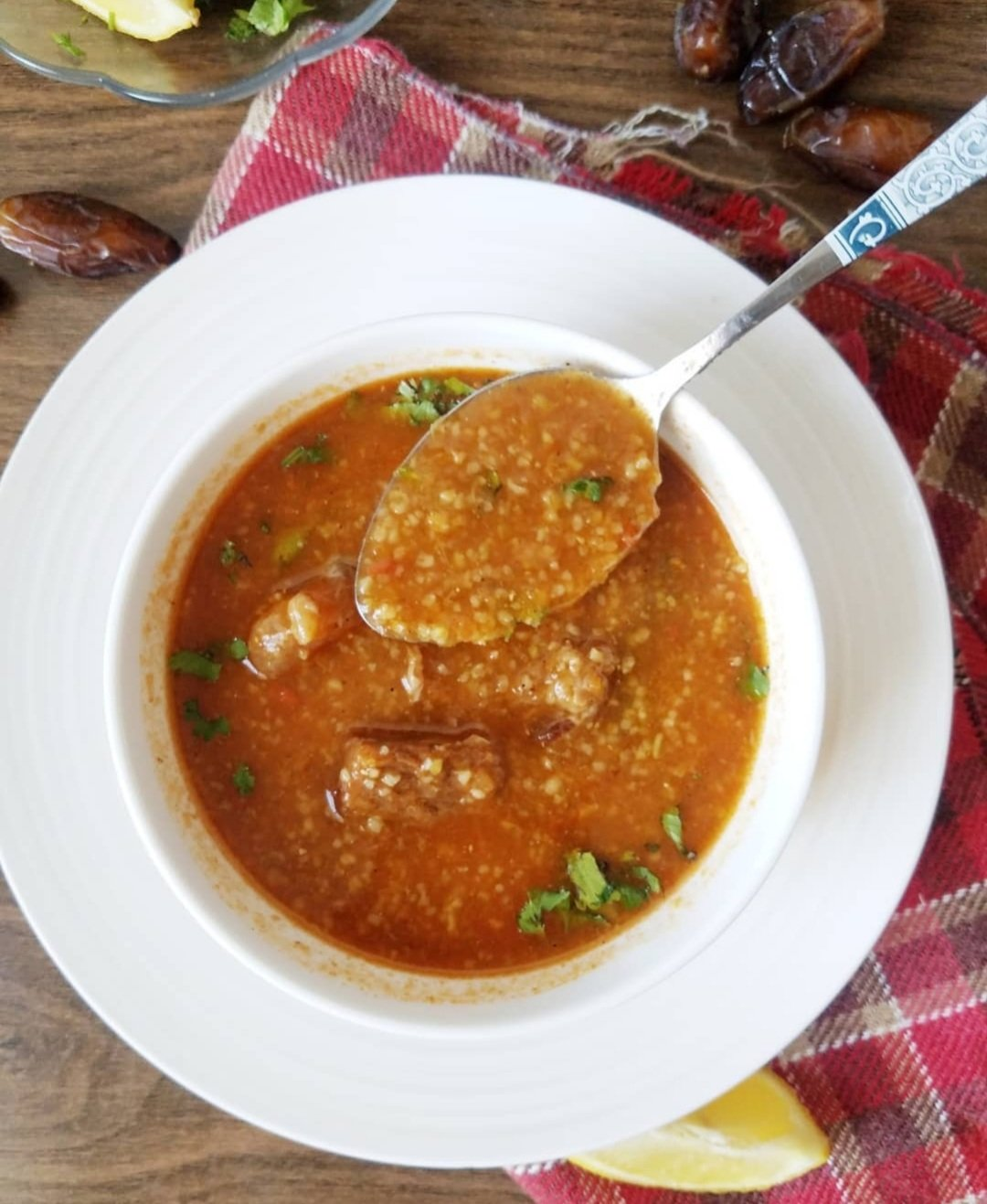
- Alternative names: Chorba
- Course: Soup
- Region or state: Algeria; Tunisia
- Serving temperature: Hot
- Main ingredients: crushed green wheat and meat

Chorba frik (Arabic: شربة فريك) is a traditional soup prepared in Algeria and Tunisia that is made with lamb or beef, vegetables, and frik, a type of wheat that has been harvested while still green and then roasted and rubbed to remove the outer husk. The resulting grain is then dried and can be stored for later use.

To make chorba frik, the meat is first browned in a pot with onions and garlic, and then water is added along with the vegetables, which often include carrots, celery, tomatoes, and chickpeas. Frik is added to the pot and simmered with the other ingredients until the soup is thick. Various spices and herbs such as turmeric, cumin, coriander, and mint are added to give the soup flavor.

Chorba frik is popular in Algeria particularly during the winter months and Ramadan. It is often served with bread on the side and is a staple of Algerian cuisine.
