= Kalb el louz =

Algerian food item

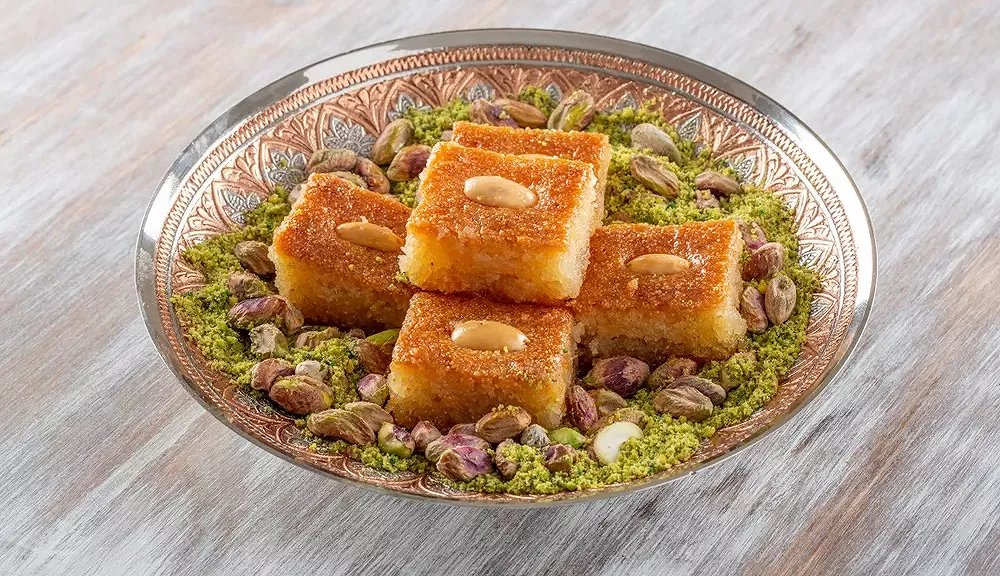
- Type: Dessert
- Place of origin: Algeria

Kalb el louz or qalb ellouz (Arabic: قلب اللوز) is a traditional semolina-based Algerian dessert.

Kelb el louz, which means "heart of almonds", is also known as chamia or h’rissa depending on the region. It is a traditional Algerian dessert. It is made with semolina, almonds, orange blossom and honey.

== See also ==
- Algerian cuisine
- Basbousa
