= Chakhchoukha =

Algerian dish of torn bread and stew

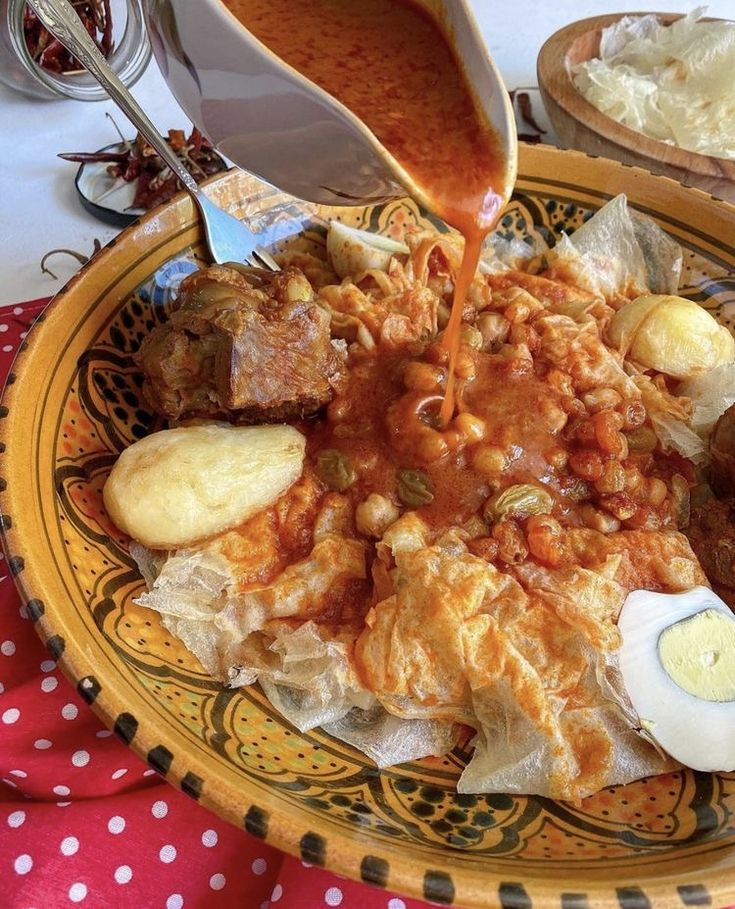
- Alternative names: Chekhechoukha (شخشوخة)
- Type: Stew
- Course: Main course
- Place of origin: Algeria
- Region or state: Constantine, Batna, Biskra, Ms'sila
- Serving temperature: Hot
- Main ingredients: Chickpea, tomatoes, onions, garlic, meat, vegetables, Algerian spices
- Variations: Chakhchoukha Biskria, Chakhchoukhat dfar
- Similar dishes: Zviti

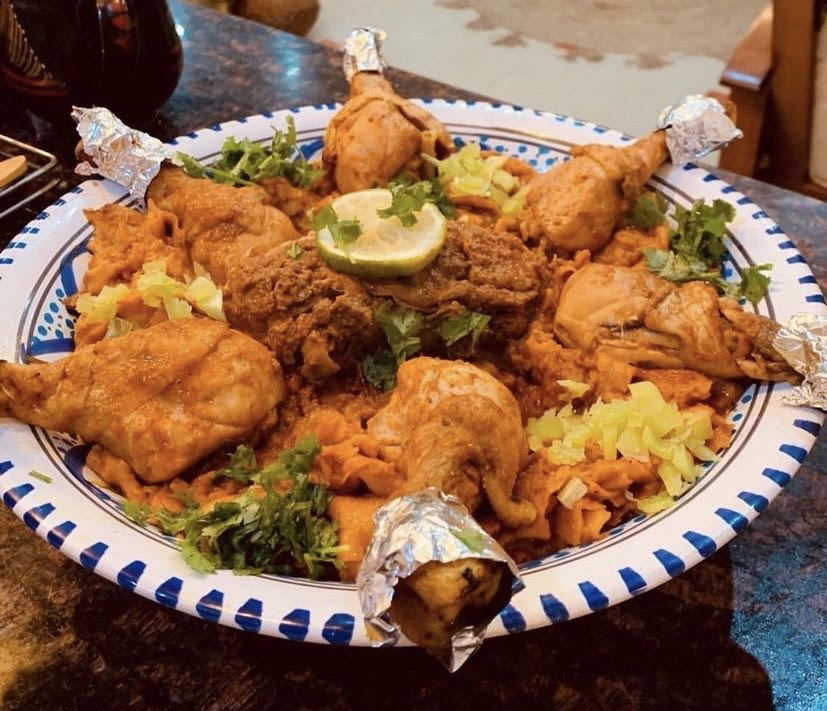
Chicken chakhchoukha

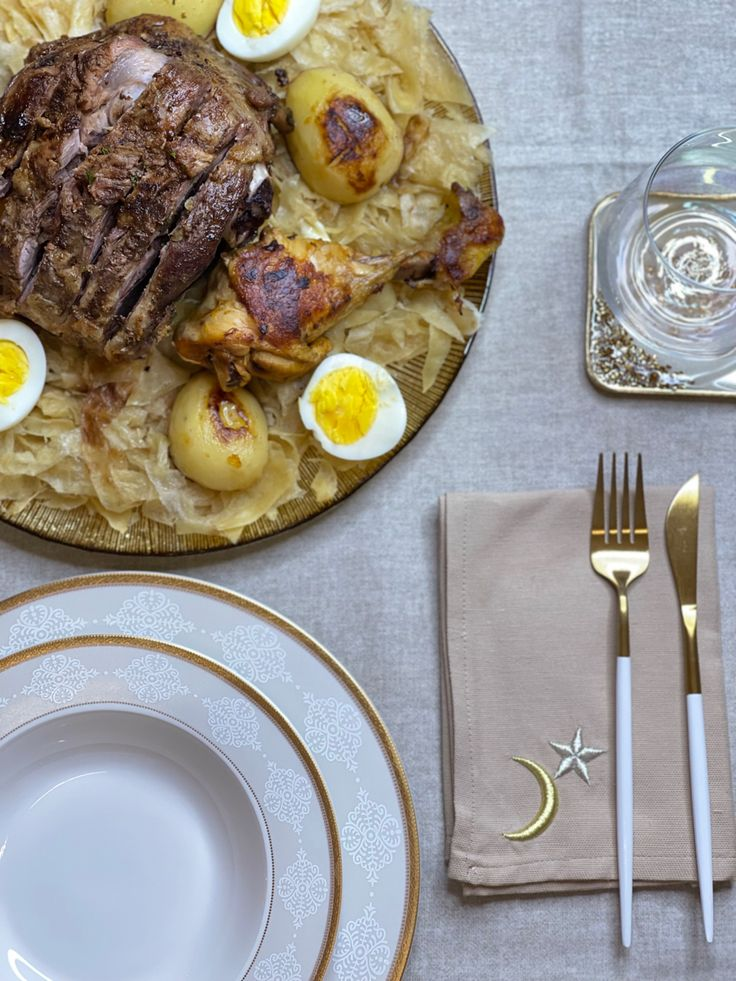
Algerian chakhchoukha of Biskra

Chakhchoukha or chekhechoukha (Arabic: شخشوخة) is a traditional Algerian dish made from torn or rolled pieces of cooked semolina dough that are served in a tomato-based sauce. The dish consists of small pieces of rougag (thin round flatbread) mixed with marqa, a tomato stew. The dish is typically made by boiling the semolina dough in salted water until it is cooked and then rolling it into small balls or tearing it into bite-sized pieces.

The tomato-based sauce for chakhchoukha is typically made from a mixture of onions, garlic, tomatoes, and spices such as cumin, paprika, and harissa. The semolina dough is then added to the sauce and simmered until it has absorbed the flavors of the sauce and has softened slightly.

Chakhchoukha is often served with meat, such as lamb or beef, which is cooked separately and then added to the dish along with chickpeas or other vegetables such as carrots or turnips. The dish is typically garnished with fresh herbs such as parsley or cilantro and served with bread on the side.

== Variations ==
Chakhchoukha dfer and chakhchoukha biskria are two different types of chakhchoukha that are popular in Algerian cuisine, especially in Eastern Algeria. Here are the main differences between them:

Chakhchoukhet dfer: This type of chakhchoukha is made with pieces of broken-up baked bread, rather than semolina dough. The bread is soaked in a tomato-based sauce that is flavored with spices, butter and herbs. The dish is often served with meat, such as lamb or beef, and sometimes includes vegetables such as chickpeas and carrots. This chakhchoukha is typical of the region of Constantine.

Chakhchoukha biskria: This chakhchoukha is typically made by tearing or cutting small pieces of thin, round flatbread and serving them in a fragrant meat sauce that has been cooked with chickpeas and vegetables. While lamb is the preferred meat in this dish, beef or chicken can also be used. This chakhchoukha is typical of the region of Biskra.

== Description ==
Chakhchoukha is an originally Chaoui culinary specialty that has now extended to other parts of Algeria. The word chakhchoukha comes from tacherchert, "crumbing" or "tearing into small pieces" in the Chaouia language.

Chakhchoukha is eaten on various occasions, especially during Mouloud, Achoura, and the Amazigh New Year called "Yennayer." This celebration includes two parts: the eve, known as "Laadjouza", where dried foods are eaten to mark the end of the previous year, and the following day, the start of the new year, when dishes with sauce are consumed, with each region having its own variations of vegetables and eggs.

== Preparation ==
The rougag or flat bread is made with fine semolina and, after baking, is torn by hand into small pieces. When eating in individual plates, about two handfuls are put in the plate and then the sauce or stew is poured on top.

The marqa or stew consists of diced lamb cooked with spices, tomatoes, chopped onions and chick peas. Often potatoes, zucchini, carrots and green peppers are added to the mixture depending on the season, the area and the family.

The main spices used for the stew are dried red chillies, caraway, ras el hanout, black pepper and cumin.

There is a variant of this dish in Batna and nearby towns, like Barika, M'Sila and Biskra, that uses a different type of bread.

== See also ==
- List of Middle Eastern dishes
- Algerian cuisine
- Torta de gazpacho, a similar Spanish dish both in its appearance and origin
- List of African dishes
