= Créponné =

Algerian lemon sorbet

Creponne
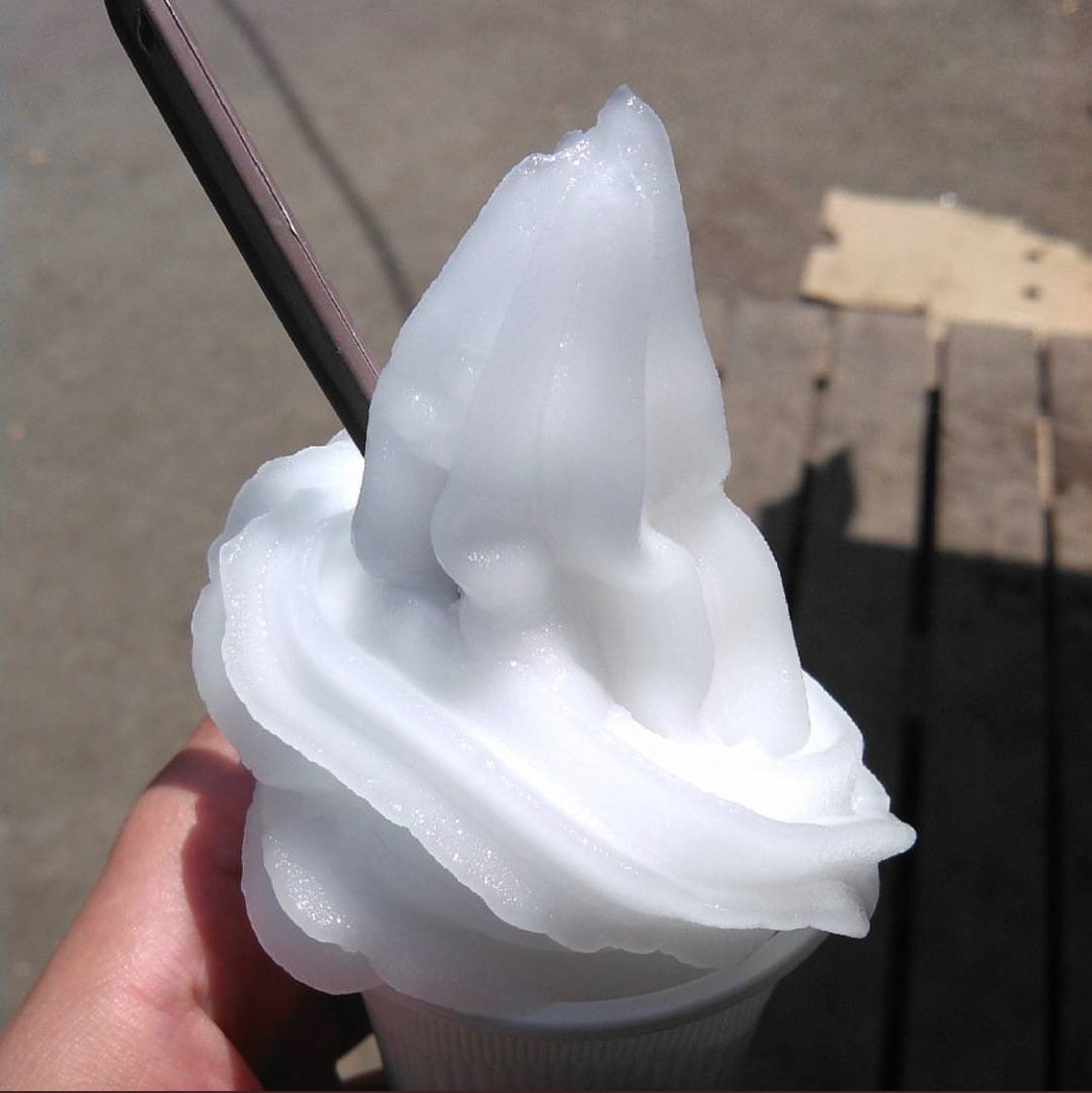
- Type: Sorbet
- Place of origin: Oran, French Algeria
- Created by: Gilbert Soriano

Créponné (from French, meaning wavy) is a traditional Pied-noir and Algerian lemon sorbet that was created in Oran in the time of French Algeria by Gilbert Soriano at the Crèmerie l'Oranaise.

It is a kind of sorbet made with whisked egg whites, lemon juice and sugar.

== See also ==
- Algerian cuisine
