= Kroki =

Algerian food item

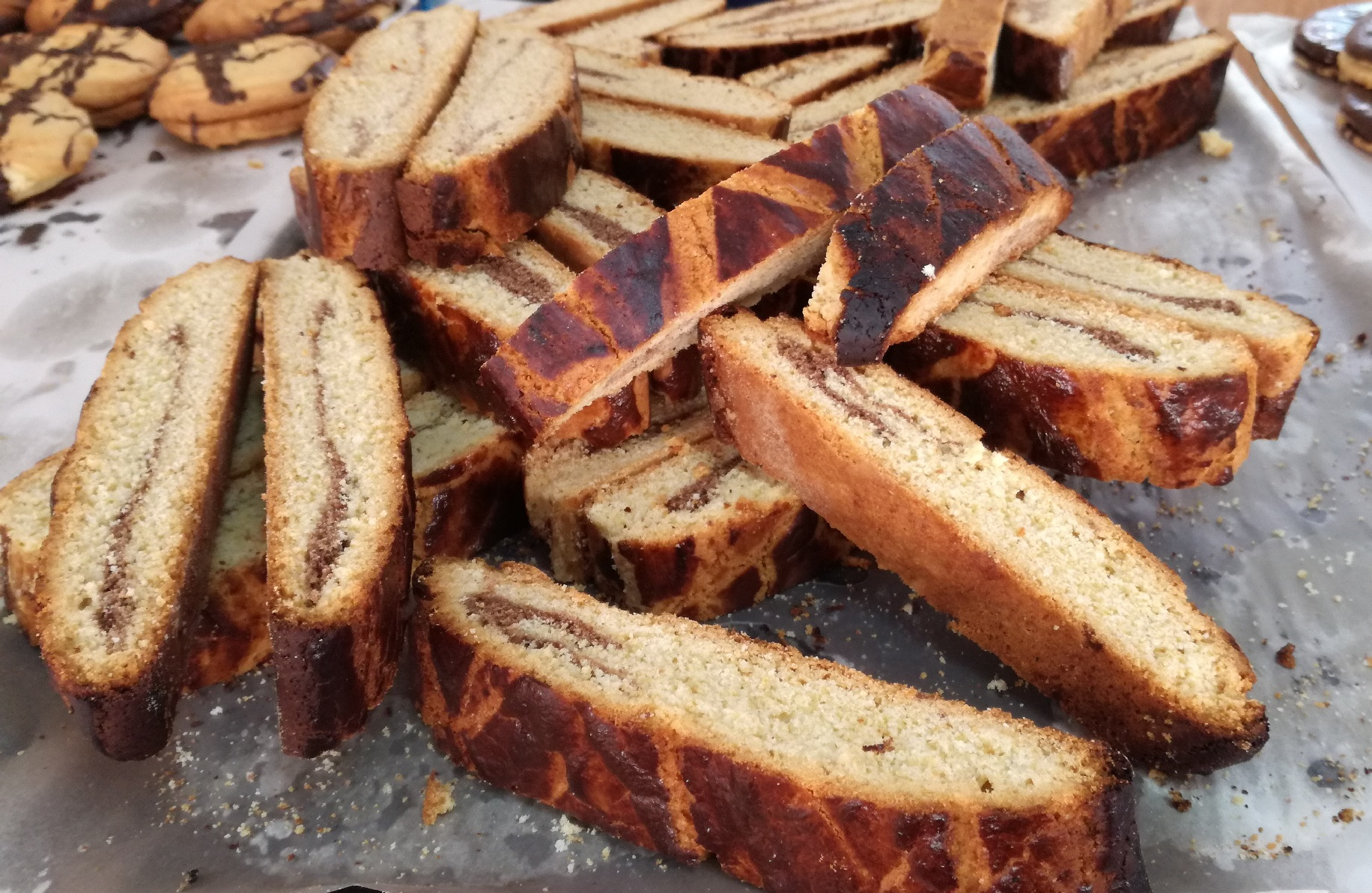
- Type: Biscuit
- Place of origin: Algeria

Kroki is a traditional Algerian biscuit and a specialty in Algerian cuisine.

Kroki is an Algerian cookie that is made using flour, sugar, eggs, yeast, oil or butter and it is flavoured using lemon zest, vanilla and orange blossom water.

== See also ==
• Cuisine of Algeria
