= Hamoud Boualem =

Algerian soft drink manufacturing company

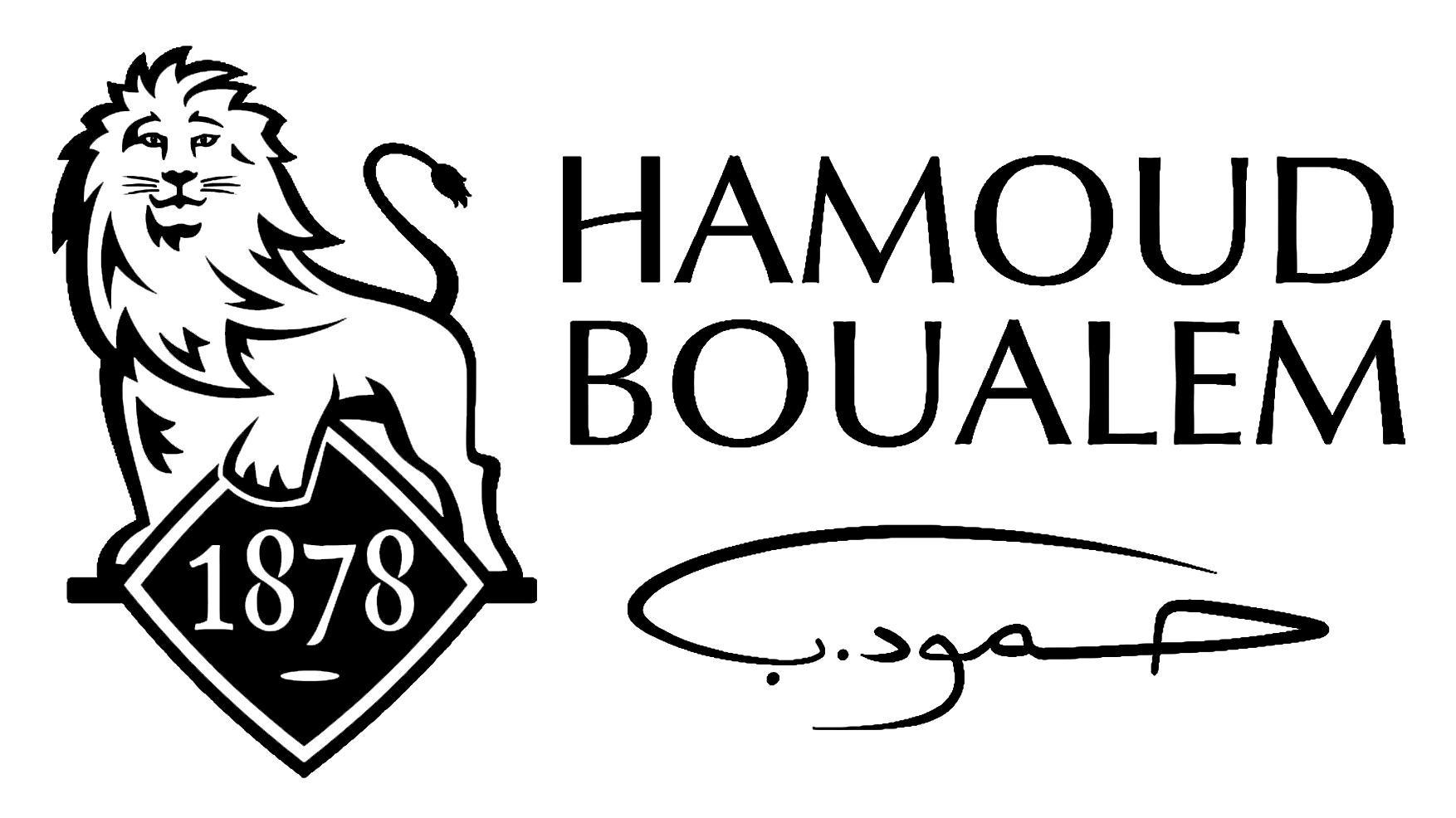
- Logo of Hamoud Boualem.
- Industry: Beverages
- Founded: 1878; 148 years ago
- Founder: Boualem Hamoud
- Headquarters: Algeria
- Brands: Selecto, Slim, Dhaya, Alma, Gazouz blanche, Cola
- Total assets: 900
- Subsidiaries: Lion in Boufarik Dhaya in Sidi Bel Abbès Alma in Ouzellaguen
- Website: https://www.hamoud-boualem.com

Hamoud Boualem (Arabic: حمود بوعلام) is an Algerian soft drink manufacturing company. It produces fizzy drinks popular in Algeria and exports to France, the United Kingdom, and Canada. Its products include sodas such as "Selecto", "Hamoud", "Slim" (in various flavours), and various flavours of syrup. Its head offices are located in central Algiers.

== History ==
Hamoud was founded in 1878. Its first factory was in the Belcourt neighbourhood of Algiers, it is among the country's oldest companies.

Youssef Hammoud, flavour distiller by profession, settled in the suburbs of Belcourt and created the lemonade La Royale, ancestor of the emblematic Hamoud la Blanche. La Royale, made from hand-selected lemon essence, won a gold medal, classified Hors concours, at the Paris World Fair in 1889. It later received several gold and silver medals. In 1907, they added Victoria, a brownish apple and caramel flavour. This drink, known today as SELECTO, is part of the Algerian identity heritage.

In 1920, Boualem Hammoud, Youssef's grandson, registered the trademark and changed the name of the company from Hamoud & Sons to Hamoud Boualem & Cie. That year, the company moved to Hassiba Ben Bouali Street, still the company's headquarters. Later, Hamoud Boualem launched a lemon drink under the Slim label with the slogan "Slim, le citron qui prime." Today, the Slim brand has five flavours (lemon, orange, green apple, pineapple and bitter).

The Hamoud and Hafiz families merged, and the company became an LLC. In 2003, Hamoud Boualem modernised its installations and launched the PET format which completes its range of returnable glass. The company is increasingly opening up to the export market. It inaugurated a new factory in Boufarik (wilaya of Blida) in order to increase its production capacity and meet increasing demand.

The Can was launched in 2017.

In 2018, Hamoud Boualem launched Lim ON, its new range of drinks with carbonated fruit juices, available in three flavours: Citrus, Orange pulp and Mojito. In 2020, the PET was launched in 33cl and 1L capacity.

== Products ==
Hamoud Boualem offers a diverse range of soft drinks that have become staples in Algerian households and beyond. Some of the company's most popular products include:

- Selecto: A drink that competes with international brands.
- Hamoud:A lemon-lime soda.
- Slim: Available in a variety of fruit flavours, Slim offers a lighter and sweeter alternative to traditional sodas.
- Lim ON: Lim ON is a range of carbonated fruit juice beverages offering a mix of sweetness and refreshment.
- Hamoud Cola: A Cola Which has a Selecto looking flavour, it is the most recent drink produced by Hamoud Boualem.

== Cultural Impact ==
Hamoud Boualem is synonymous with Algerian culture and is often associated with nostalgia and tradition.
