= Derssa =

Condiment in Algerian cuisine

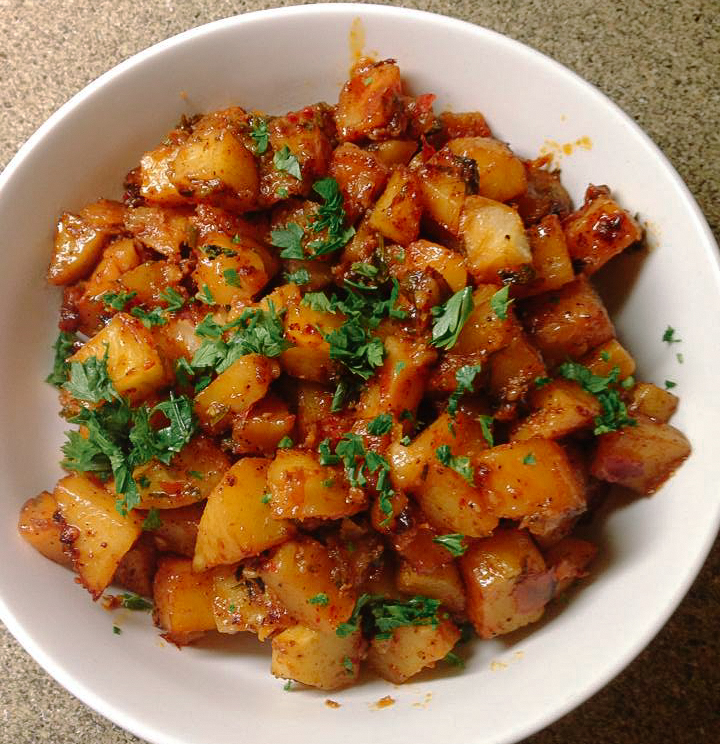
Potatoes with derssa sauce

Derssa (Arabic: درسة) is a popular condiment in Algerian cuisine, which is typically made with garlic, cumin, red chili pepper flakes, and olive oil. It is often served alongside grilled or roasted meats, and also used as a marinade for meat or vegetables before cooking. It is a versatile condiment and is often used to add flavor to various dishes, It can also be used as a dipping sauce for bread or vegetables, or as a spread for sandwiches or wraps.

The exact recipe for derssa can vary from region to region or even from household to household, with some variations including additional ingredients such as coriander, lemon juice, or tomato paste. However, the key ingredients of garlic, cumin, chili flakes, and olive oil are usually present in most versions of the condiment.

Derssa is known for its strong, spicy flavor, and is a staple in many Algerian households. It is sometimes spelled as "dersa" or "dersah", and is also known as "harissa" in some regions. However, it should not be confused with the North African hot sauce also called harissa, which is made with different ingredients such as roasted red peppers, garlic, and spices.

In Algerian cuisine, derssa is typically made by crushing or grinding garlic and cumin with a mortar and pestle or in a food processor, and then mixing in red chili pepper flakes and olive oil until a paste-like consistency is achieved. The derssa is then usually left to sit for several hours or overnight to allow the flavors to meld together before being served. In addition to the basic ingredients of garlic, cumin, chili flakes, and olive oil, some variations of derssa may include other spices or ingredients such as paprika, coriander, lemon juice, or tomato paste. The exact recipe for derssa can vary depending on personal preference or regional traditions.
