= Baghrir =

Pancake dish in Maghrebi cuisine

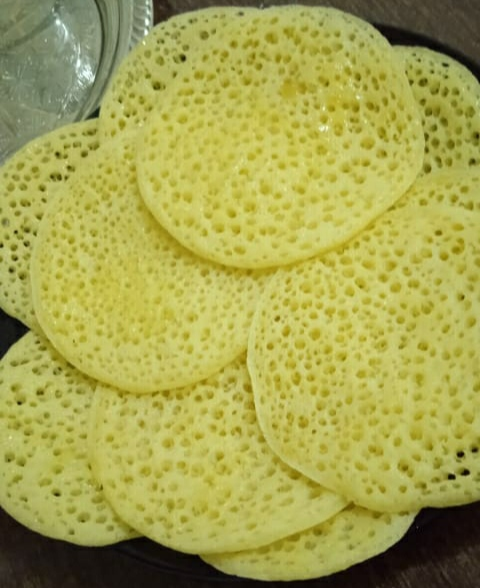
- Type: Pancake
- Region or state: Maghreb
- Associated cuisine: Algeria; Morocco; Tunisia
- Main ingredients: Semolina, often raisins

Baghrir or beghrir (Arabic:البغرير), also known as ghrayef or mchahda, is a pancake consumed in Algeria, Morocco and Tunisia. They are small, spongy, and made with semolina or flour; when cooked correctly, they are riddled with tiny holes (which soak up whatever sauce they are served with). The most common way to eat baghrir in Algeria and Morocco is by dipping them in a honey-butter mixture, but they can also be cut into wedges and served with jam. Baghrir is popular for breakfast, as a snack, and for iftar during Ramadan. On the 9th day of Ramadan, the Mozabite people of Algeria exchange baghrir as a form of tradition, which they call m'layin; they are also distributed to the poor.

== Etymology ==
In the Maghreb, this type of pancake is also known as gh'rayf, in Tunisia and eastern Algeria (Constantine, Collo, Skikda), kh'ringu in Morocco and Algeria, [grifa, gh'rayf]; [m'layn, s. m'layna]; [gh’rayf]; [gh’rayf]; [kh’ringu, kh’ringu]; [khringu] in Algeria. This lexical diversity denotes a rich and ancient regional tradition. As for the word baghrir, it seems to be typical of Maghrebi-Western Arabic dialects (Morocco, Algeria) and is unknown elsewhere. The lexicographer Mohamed Sbihi considers, in his Mu'djam, that the word baghrir is in some way an alteration of the Arabic baghir of the verb baghara; the baghir, according to the classic Arabic dictionaries, is the one who drinks without being able to quench his thirst (generally said of an animal). It is possible that the word was used in this case by allusion to the great absorbability of these pancakes, which have holes like a sponge.

== See also ==
- List of pancakes
- Lahoh
- Crumpet
- Injera
