= Berkoukes (dish) =

Dish from Maghreb

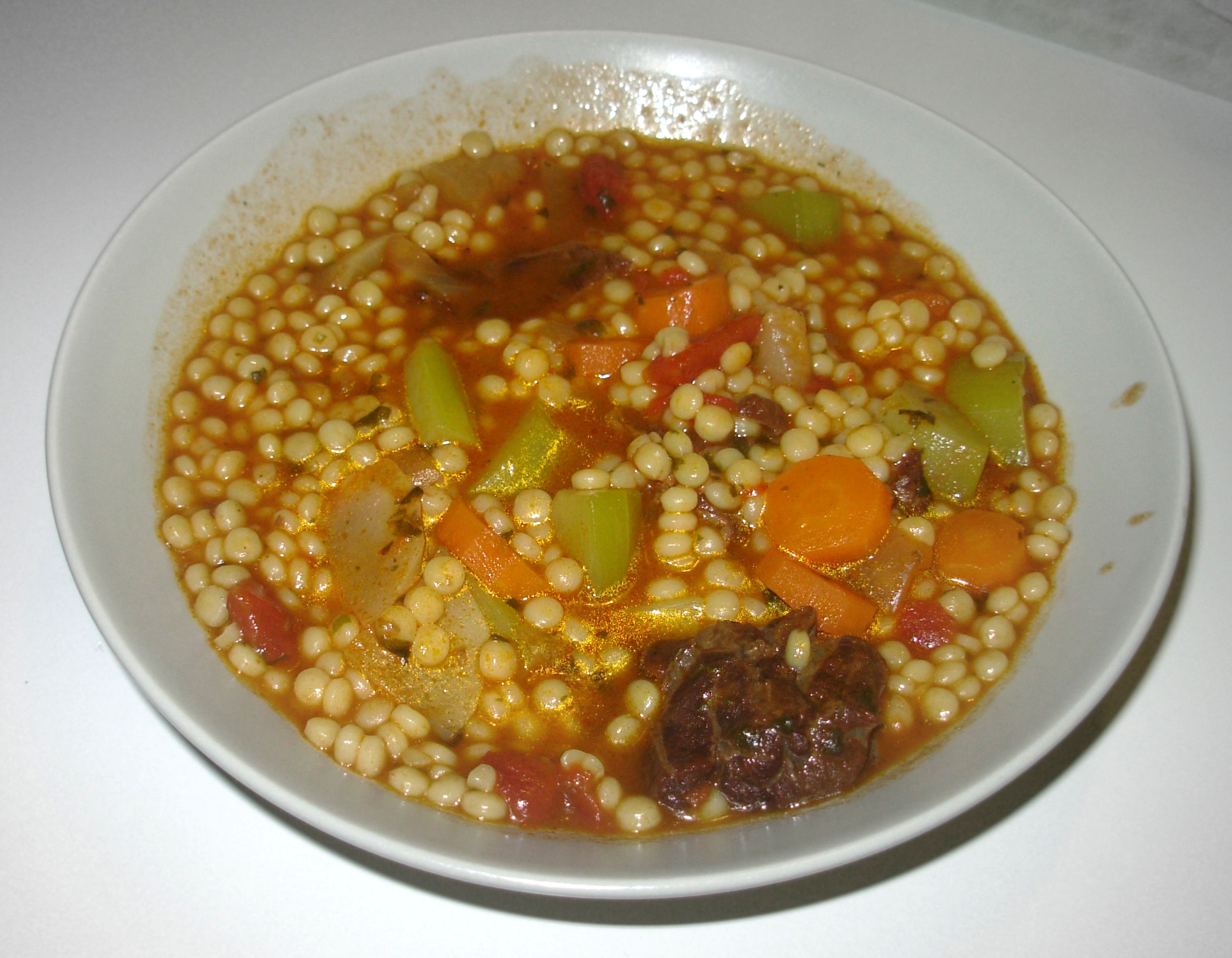
- Alternative names: berkoukech, aïch, avazine
- Place of origin: Maghreb

Berkoukes (Tamazight : ⵜⴰⴱⵔⴽⵓⴽⵙⵜ, Taberkukest), also named berkoukech, aïch or avazine is a traditional North African dish, particularly popular in Algeria, Tunisia, and parts of Morocco. It consists of large hand-rolled semolina pasta, often compared to pearl couscous or fregola, and is typically prepared with vegetables, legumes, and aromatic spices.

== Etymology ==
The name berkoukes is derived from the Arabic root "brk," which is associated with kneading or rolling, referring to the process of shaping the pasta. The term berkukec (from a prefix augmentative + kukec, meaning "couscous") is used in the dialect of Ouargla and Mozabite, where it translates to "large-grain couscous". The dish is also known by regional variations of its name, such as aïch in some Berber-speaking communities.

== History ==
The tradition of making pasta in North Africa dates back centuries. Medieval Arab-Andalusian and Maghrebi texts describe various types of handmade pasta, including berkoukes. Ibn Razin Tujibi, a 13th-century Andalusian gastronome, documented different pasta preparations in his culinary treatise Fudalat al-Khiwan. Historical sources suggest that in the 12th century, North Africa had as many pasta varieties as couscous preparations, with berkoukes among them. These traditional pastas were valued for being affordable, nutritious, and adaptable to different regional flavors.

== Preparation ==
Berkoukes is traditionally made by rolling coarse semolina with water and a bit of flour to form large, round granules. These granules are then dried or used fresh in various stews and soups.

A typical berkoukes dish includes:

- Pasta: handmade semolina-based granules
- Vegetables: tomatoes, carrots, zucchini, potatoes, and chickpeas
- Protein: often lamb or chicken, or left vegetarian with legumes
- Spices and aromatics: cumin, paprika, cinnamon, garlic, and bay leaves

The ingredients are slow-cooked in a tomato-based broth until tender, with the pasta added towards the end of cooking to absorb the flavors.

== Cultural significance ==
Berkoukes is commonly prepared during family gatherings, special occasions, and religious festivities such as Ramadan. It is also considered a nourishing dish for winter, often recommended for its warming properties.

== Similar dishes ==
- Moghrabieh: Lebanese dish featuring large semolina pearls cooked with chickpeas and meat.
- Fregula: Sardinian pasta that closely resembles berkoukes in shape and texture.
- Couscous: a smaller-grained semolina dish widely consumed across North Africa.

== See also ==
- North African cuisine
