= Zviti =

Algerian dish

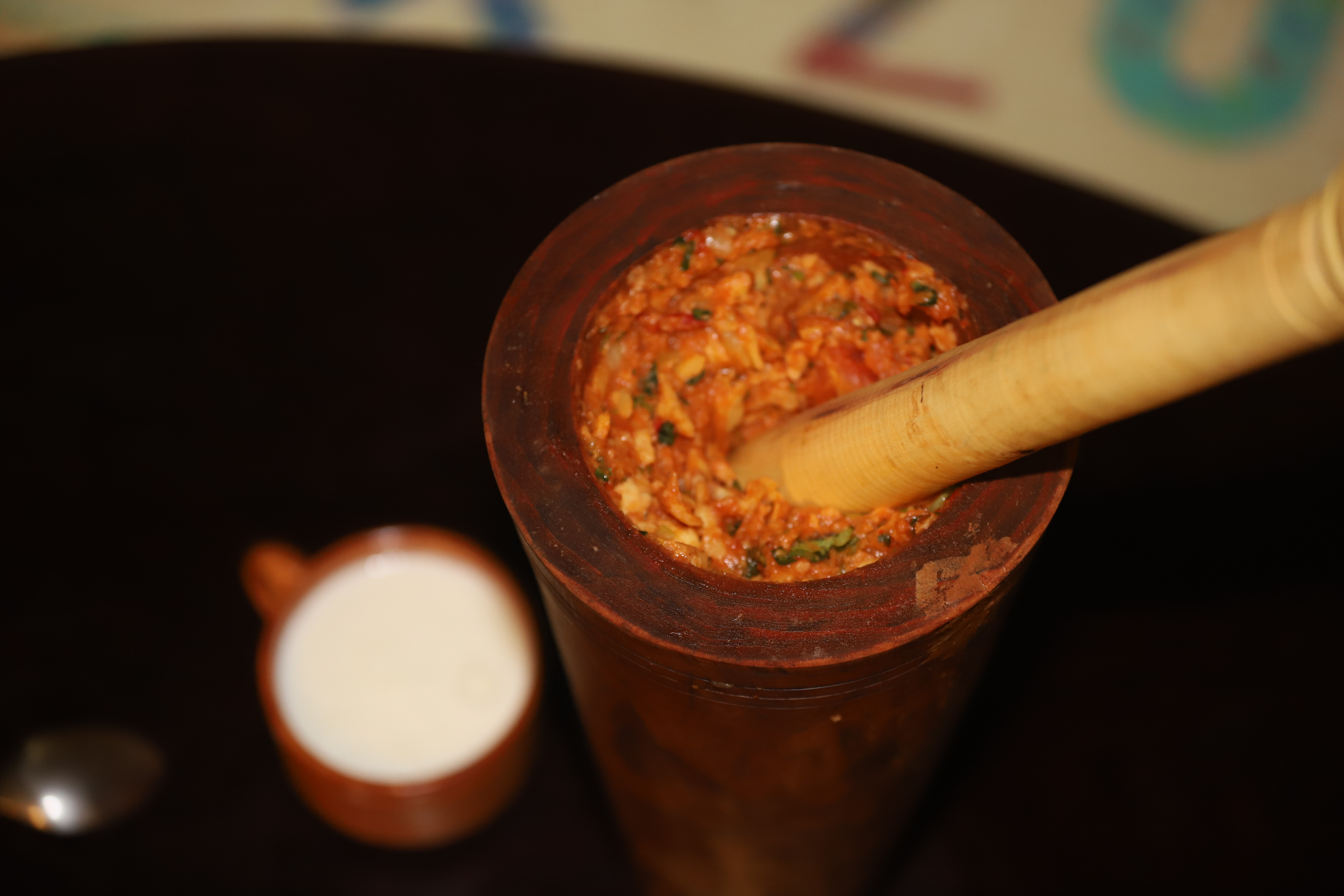
- Traditional Algerian zviti served in a mahras
- Alternative names: Zfiti, z'fiti, sfiti, batot, slata mehras
- Type: Flatbread dish
- Place of origin: Algeria
- Region or state: Bou Saâda
- Serving temperature: Hot
- Main ingredients: Rakhsas, chili peppers, garlic, tomatoes, coriander
- Similar dishes: Chakhchoukha
- Other information: Commonly accompanied by Leben

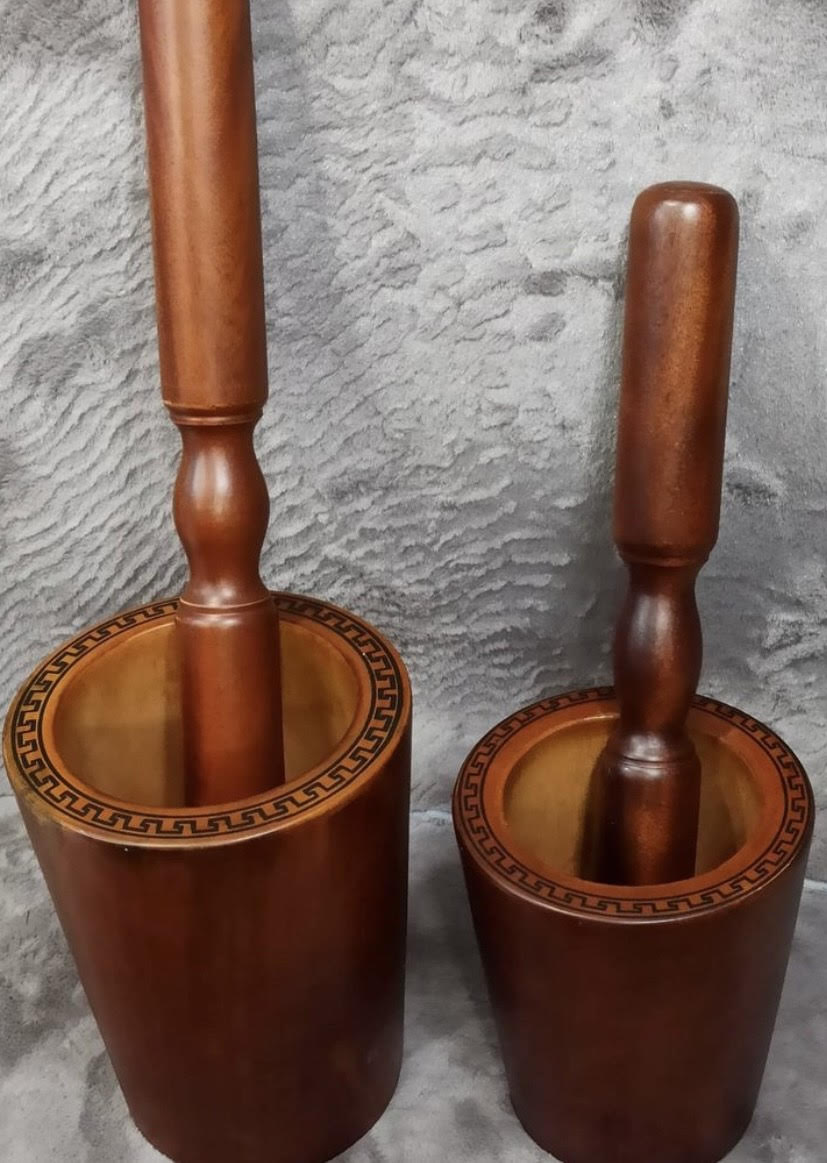
Mahras in Dely brahim, Algeria

Zviti (Arabic: زفيطي), from Bou-saada, is a traditional vegetarian Algerian dish. Zviti, along with Chakhchoukha, is one of the most popular meals in the Ouled Nail and the Bousaada area. It is also known as Slata Mahras, named after the big wooden mortar and pestle that is also used for cooking and serving the dish (Mahras). This traditional meal is served on special occasions and holiday celebrations.

== Origin ==
This dish originates from the city of Bou Saâda in Bou-saada Province Bou-saada, Algeria. However, it is widespread in M'sila and in the small towns of Rommana, El Allig, Eddis, Oultem and all around the country.

== Preparation ==
Zviti prepared using traditional Algerian Reqass bread or Kesra, which is produced with wheat flour without fermentation, pieces of this bread is broken down then added to a hot mixture of tomatoes and garlic that have been crushed in a mahras before hand, a variety of spices like chili, black pepper, ras el hanout are included, coriander, water and olive oil are also added. Green olives are also used in some regions, such as Bousaada and its surroundings.
