= List of Moroccan dishes =

This is a list of dishes in the cuisine of Morocco. Entries in beige color indicate types of generic foods.

== Main dishes ==
Name Other names	Image	Type	Description
Baghrir		Entrée	A yeasted semolina pancake.
Briouat		Entrée	Triangular or cylinder-shaped savory or sweet pastry covered with warqa (a paper-thin Moroccan dough)
Boulfaf skewers		Entrée	Cubed lamb liver wrapped in lamb fat, grilled on skewers
Bourekas; Burek		Entrée	
Couscous		Main course	Semolina, meat, and vegetables. Traditionally 7 vegetables.
Ferakh Maamer		Entrée	A dish of spring chicken stuffed with sweetened couscous and enhanced with raisins, orange-flower water, almonds, and sugar. The ingredients are then placed in a large casserole and simmered slowly in a sauce made of honey, onion, garlic, ginger, cinnamon, and saffron.
Harira		Entrée	Thick soup based on tomatoes (beans, lentils and other products can be added)
Bissara		Entrée	A soup prepared with dried, puréed broad beans as a primary ingredient
Kefta magawara		Main course	Kefta tajine served with tomato, eggs
Kemia			An array of small dishes
Khlea khli or Kleehe		Breakfast	Preserved dried meat
Khobz		bread	Bread
Lentil soup		soup	Soup made with lentil
Merguez			A spicy lamb sausage
Ma'quda			potato fritter
Méchoui		Main course	Roasted lamb
Milina		Entrée	Chicken/Eggs
Moroccan cigars		Appetizer	Ground beef wrapped in dough
Mrouzia		Main course	A sweet dish of lamb with raisins, almonds and honey
Djaj mqalli		Entrée	Chicken cooked with preserved lemon
Pastilla		Entrée	Chicken/Almonds/Seafood
Rfissa		Main course	Lentils encased in filo pastry soaked in meat broth
Sardine		Entrée	Sardines with preserved lemon
Tajine		Main course	Meat, vegetables
Tangia		Main course	Meat, vegetables (a typical dish of Marrakesh)

== Salads ==
Name	Image	Type	Description
Bakoula		Salad	Salad of cooked greens such as mallow leaves, or spinach, and parsley, cilantro, lemon, olives.
Moroccan salad		Salad	
Moroccan spreads		Salad	"Cooked salads."
Taktouka		Salad	Grilled tomato and green pepper salad
Lhzina		Salad	Oranges/Paprika/Black olives
Zaalouk		Salad	Cooked mixture of eggplant and tomatoes

== Condiments and sauces ==
Name	Image	Type	Description
Charmoula			A marinade to flavor fish or seafood, but it can be used on other meats or vegetables. Chermoula is often made of a mixture of herbs, oil, lemon juice, pickled lemons, garlic, cumin, and salt. It may also include onion, fresh coriander, ground chili peppers, black pepper, or saffron.
Pickled lemons			Pickled lemons
Marinated Olives			Olives marinated in : olive oil, paprika, lemon, salt, pepper, harissa, cumin and other spices and herbs

== Desserts ==
Name	Image	Type	Description
Briouat bil luz		Dessert	Triangular or cylinder-shaped savory or sweet pastry covered with warqa (a paper-thin Moroccan dough) and stuffed with almond paste.
Faqqas		Dessert	A type of macaroon made with semolina flour.
Ghoriba (Ghriyyaba)		Dessert	Biscuits flavored with aniseed and sesame seeds, or almonds and raisins.
Keneffa		Dessert	A variety of bastila dessert
Gazelle ankles / ka'ab ghzal		Dessert	Almond Paste/Sugar
Limun bel-Qerfa o khayezzou mahekouk(carrotte)		Dessert	Oranges/Cinnamon
Ma'amoul		Dessert	Small shortbread pastries filled with dates, pistachios or walnuts (or occasionally almonds, figs, or other fillings).
Jowhara / Pastilla with milk		Dessert	Pastilla/Milk/Almonds/Vanilla
Rozz bel Hleeb (Rice pudding)		Dessert	Milk/Rice/Orange Blossom Water
Chebakia; Shabbakiya		Dessert	Fried dough "rose" dipped in honey and sesame seeds
Seffa; Sfaa			Sweet couscous made with cinnamon, sugar, and sometimes studded with prunes, raisins and almonds. It is served with cream.
Sellou		Dessert	Roasted flour mixed with butter or olive oil, sugar or honey, cinnamon, almonds (or sometimes peanuts), and other ingredients
Sfenj	Freshly fried doughnuts bought from a shop on Rue de Berrima in Marrakech	Dessert	A doughnut sprinkled with sugar or soaked in honey.
Qrashel	Qrashel or Qrishlat	Dessert	traditional sweet sesame rolls, made with anise and fennel and sprinkled with sesame, made in Morocco at least since the 16th century.
Meskouta	Meskouta	Dessert	A small cake made with orange, lemon, or vanilla

== Drinks ==
Name	Image	Type	Description
'Asseer Rumman			Pomegranate/Orange Blossom Water
'Asseer Limun			Orange juice
Diks			Moroccan 'nus-nus' or 'half-half'
Beet Juice			Beets/Orange Blossom Water
Grape juice			White grapes
Maghrebi mint tea			Green tea with mint and copious sugar

== See also ==
- Moroccan cuisine
