= Tunisian =

Tunisian may refer to:

- Someone or something connected to Tunisia
- Tunisian Arabic
- Tunisian people
- Tunisian cuisine
- Tunisian culture
