= Torly =

Egyptian vegetable casserole

Torly تورلي
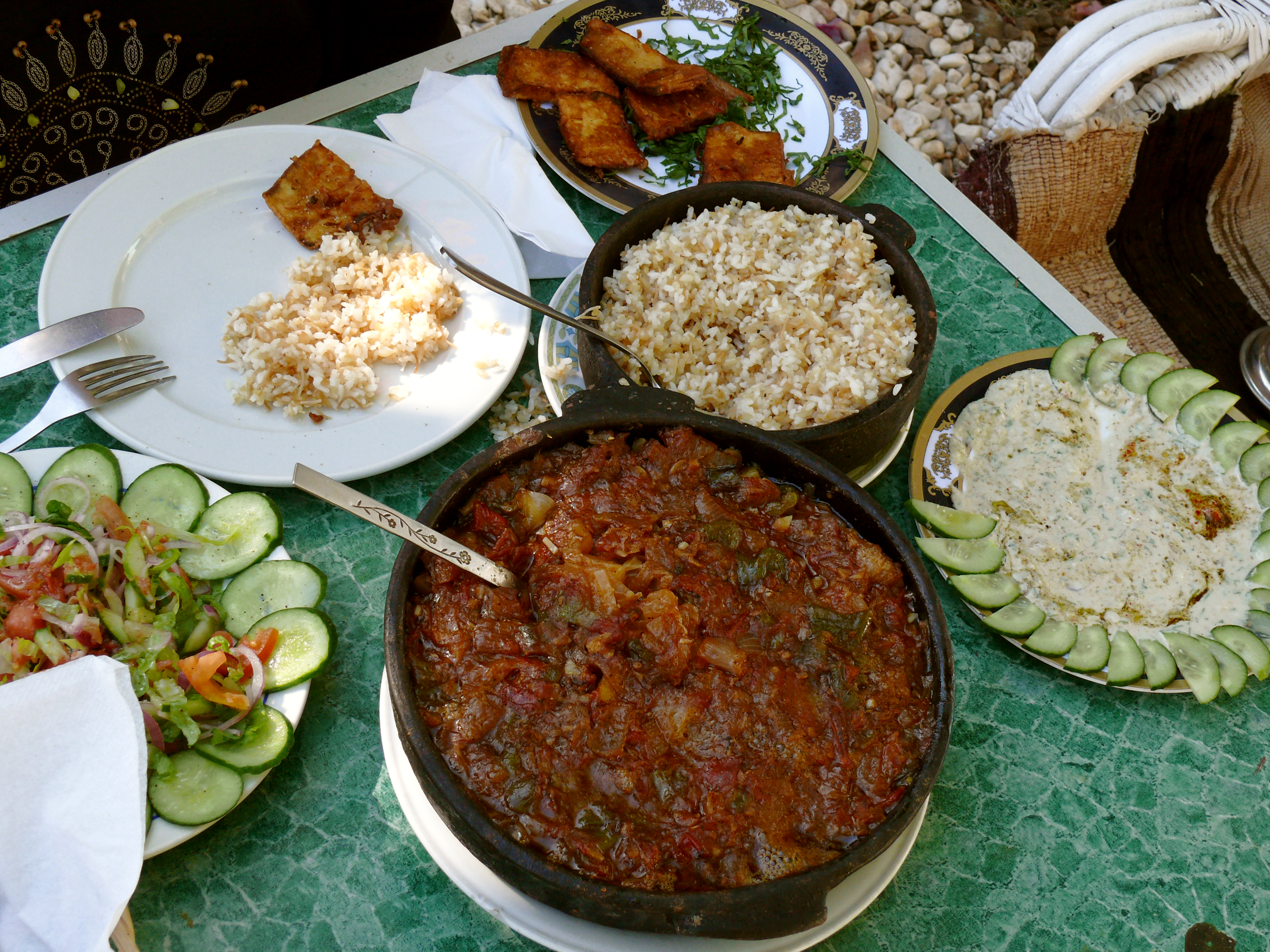
- Torly, with vermicelli rice and fried eggplant
- Type: Casserole
- Place of origin: Egypt
- Main ingredients: Chicken, beef or lamb and a variety of vegetables, usually potatoes, zucchini, carrots, onions and tomato sauce
- Similar dishes: Ratatouille

Torly (Egyptian Arabic: تورلي) is a traditional Egyptian mixed vegetable casserole that often includes chunks of meat such as beef, lamb, or chicken. This hearty and nutritious dish uses a variety of vegetables, and is a staple in Egyptian cuisine.

== Preparation ==
The preparation of torly involves layering a selection of vegetables and meat, followed by baking until tender. Commonly used vegetables include potatoes, carrots, zucchini, peas, green beans, and bell peppers. The meat is typically cut into small cubes and can be beef, lamb, or chicken, depending on preference.

To begin, the meat is browned in oil, then combined with diced onions, minced garlic, and, optionally, chopped chili peppers for added heat. After sautéing, the assorted vegetables are added and stirred together. Crushed tomatoes, tomato paste, and broth are then incorporated to create a rich base. The mixture is brought to a boil and seasoned with salt, pepper, and fresh herbs such as cilantro. The entire concoction is transferred to an oven-safe dish and baked until the surface achieves a golden-brown color.

Torly is often served with rice, providing a satisfying and well-rounded meal.

== See also ==
- Egyptian cuisine
- List of Middle Eastern dishes
- List of African dishes
