= List of Middle Eastern dishes =

This is a list of dishes found in Middle Eastern cuisine, a generalized term collectively referring to the cuisines of the Middle East and the Maghreb region. The Middle East is home to numerous different cultural and ethnic groups. This diversity is also reflected in the many local culinary traditions in choice of ingredients, style of preparation, and cooking techniques.

== Middle Eastern dishes ==
Name	Image	Country/region	Description
Ahriche		Morocco	Tripe or other animal organs wrapped around sticks or kebabs, grilled over hot coals.
Asida		North Africa	A lump of cooked wheat flour dough, sometimes with butter or honey added.
Baba ghanoush		Levant	Mashed eggplant dip with virgin olive oil, lemon juice and various seasonings, including sumac.
Baklava		Middle East	A layered pastry dessert made of filo dough, filled with chopped nuts, sweetened with syrup or honey.
Bazeen		Libya	Barley dough served with tomato sauce, eggs, potatoes, and mutton.
Bichak		Morocco	A stuffed pastry appetizer.
Brik		Tunisia	Stuffed pastry, similar to bichak.
Briouat		Morocco	Sweet puff pastry.
Chakhchoukha		Algeria	A stew of lamb, spices, tomatoes, and flatbread. Sometimes spelled as "shakshuka".
Chermoula		North Africa	A marinade of pickled lemons in oil, lemon juice, herbs, garlic, cumin, and salt, most often used to flavor seafood.
Couscous		North Africa	A semolina pasta in the form of very fine, very tiny balls or squares.
Dolma		Middle East	A group of rice- or meat-and-herb filled vegetable dishes of Ottoman origin. Variations are eaten across the Levant, the eastern Mediterranean and the Arab world. Can be served warm or cold. Similar to the Greek stuffed grape leaves, dolmadakia or sarma.
Duqqa		Egypt	A dip or seasoning of herbs, oil and spices.
Falafel		Middle East	Popular deep-fried, spherical or patty-shaped fritters made from ground chickpeas and/or broad beans, and spices and herbs.
Fesikh		Egypt	Fermented, salted mullet.
Freekeh		Levant	A cereal food made from green wheat that goes through a roasting process in its production. It is an Arab dish that is especially popular in Levantine, Arabian Peninsula, Palestinian and Egyptian cuisine, but also in North African and other neighboring cuisines.
Ful medames		Egypt	Mashed fava beans with olive oil, chopped parsley, onion, garlic, and lemon juice.
Harira		Algeria and Morocco	A traditional Algerian and Moroccan soup of Maghreb.
Hawawshi		Egypt	A traditional Egyptian food very similar to the Middle eastern pizza-like Lahmacun. It is meat minced and spiced with onions and pepper, parsley and sometimes hot peppers and chilies, placed between two circular layers of dough, then baked in the oven.
Hummus		Middle East	A Middle Eastern dip, spread or savory dish made from cooked, mashed chickpeas blended with tahini, lemon juice and garlic.
Kashk bademjan		Iran	A staple Iranian dish of kashk and eggplant either, with garnishes of caramelized onions, roasted nuts, herbs and spices.
Kebab		Middle East	A wide variety of grilled or barbecued meat dishes often skewered (Shish Kebabs) originating in the Middle East and later on adopted in Turkey, Azerbaijan, Southern Europe, South Asia and Asia Minor, now found worldwide.
Kibbeh		Levant	Kibbeh (also kubba or Köfte) is the basis of family of Middle Eastern dishes, and involves a filling of spiced ground meat and onions surrounded by a grain-based outer shell that is fried or baked.
Kibbeh nayyeh		Levant	A Levantine mezze that consists of minced raw lamb mixed with fine bulgur and spices.
Kushari		Egypt	Made from rice, lentils, chickpeas and macaroni covered with tomato sauce and fried onions.
Lablabi		Tunisia	A Tunisian dish based on chick peas in a thin garlic and cumin-flavoured soup, served over small pieces of stale crusty bread.
Makroudh		Tunisia and Morocco and Algeria	A pastry often filled with dates or almonds.
Matbucha		Morocco	The name of the dish originates from Arabic and means "cooked [salad]". It is served as an appetizer, often as part of a meze. In Israel it is sometimes referred to as "Turkish salad" (Hebrew: סלט טורקי salat turki).
Méchoui		North Africa, Cameroon	A whole sheep or a lamb spit roasted on a barbecue. It is popular in North Africa and among the Bamileke people of Cameroon.
Merguez		North Africa	A very spicy, red sausage of mutton or beef.
Mesfouf		Tunisia	Similar to couscous, with butter added.
Mrouzia		Morocco	Sweet and salty tajine with honey, cinnamon and almonds.
Msemen		Maghreb	Traditional pancakes in Maghreb; usually eaten with a cup of aromatic morning mint tea or of creamy coffee. Msemen can also be stuffed with vegetable or meat fillings.
Mulukhiyah		Egypt	The leaves of the Corchorus species are used as a vegetable in Middle Eastern, East African, North African, and South Asian cuisine. Mulukhiyyah is rather bitter, and, when boiled, the resulting liquid is a thick, highly mucilaginous broth; it is often described as "slimy," rather like cooked okra.
Pastilla		Algeria and Morocco	A traditional Moroccan dish; an elaborate meat pie traditionally made of squab (fledgling pigeons). As squabs are often hard to get, shredded chicken is more often used today; pastilla can also use fish, meats or offal as a filling.
Qatayef		Egypt and Levant	An Arab dessert, commonly served during the month of Ramadan; a sort of sweet dumpling filled with cream or nuts. It is usually prepared using Akkawi cheese as a filling.
Sfenj		North Africa	Donuts cooked in oil then soaked in honey or sprinkled with sugar.
Shakshouka		Northwest Africa	A dish of eggs poached in a sauce of tomatoes, chili peppers, and onions, often spiced with cumin. It is believed to have a Tunisian origin.
Shawarma		Levant	A sandwich or wrap, or simply an entrée, consisting of layered, roasted meat slices cooked together, then cut into slices vertically; roasted on a slowly-turning vertical rotisserie or spit.
Shish taouk		North Africa	Marinated cubes of chicken are skewered and grilled.
Tabil		Tunisia	A Tunisian spice mixture consisting of ground coriander seed, caraway seed, garlic powder, and chili powder. The term can also refer to coriander by itself.
Tabbouleh		Levant	A Levantine salad made mostly of finely chopped parsley, with tomatoes, mint, onion, bulgur (soaked, not cooked), and seasoned with olive oil, lemon juice, salt and sweet pepper.
Tajine		North Africa	A Maghrebi dish from North Africa, that is named after the special earthenware pot in which it is cooked. A similar dish, known as tavvas, is found in the cuisine of Cyprus. The traditional tajine pot is formed entirely of a heavy clay, which is sometimes painted or glazed. Tajines in Moroccan cuisine are slow-cooked stews braised at low temperatures, resulting in tender meat with aromatic vegetables and sauce.
Toum		Levant	A garlic sauce as prepared in the Levant and Egypt similar to the European aioli. It contains garlic, salt, olive oil or vegetable oil, and lemon juice crushed using a wooden mortar and pestle. There is a variation popular in many villages, such as Zgharta, where mint is added, called "Zeit and Toum".
Usban		Libya and Tunisia	A traditional kind of Tunisian sausage, stuffed with a mixture of rice, herbs, lamb, chopped liver and heart. This dish is usually served alongside the main meal of rice or couscous, often on special occasions.

== See also ==
- List of African dishes
