= Baklouti pepper =

Variety of chili pepper

Baklouti
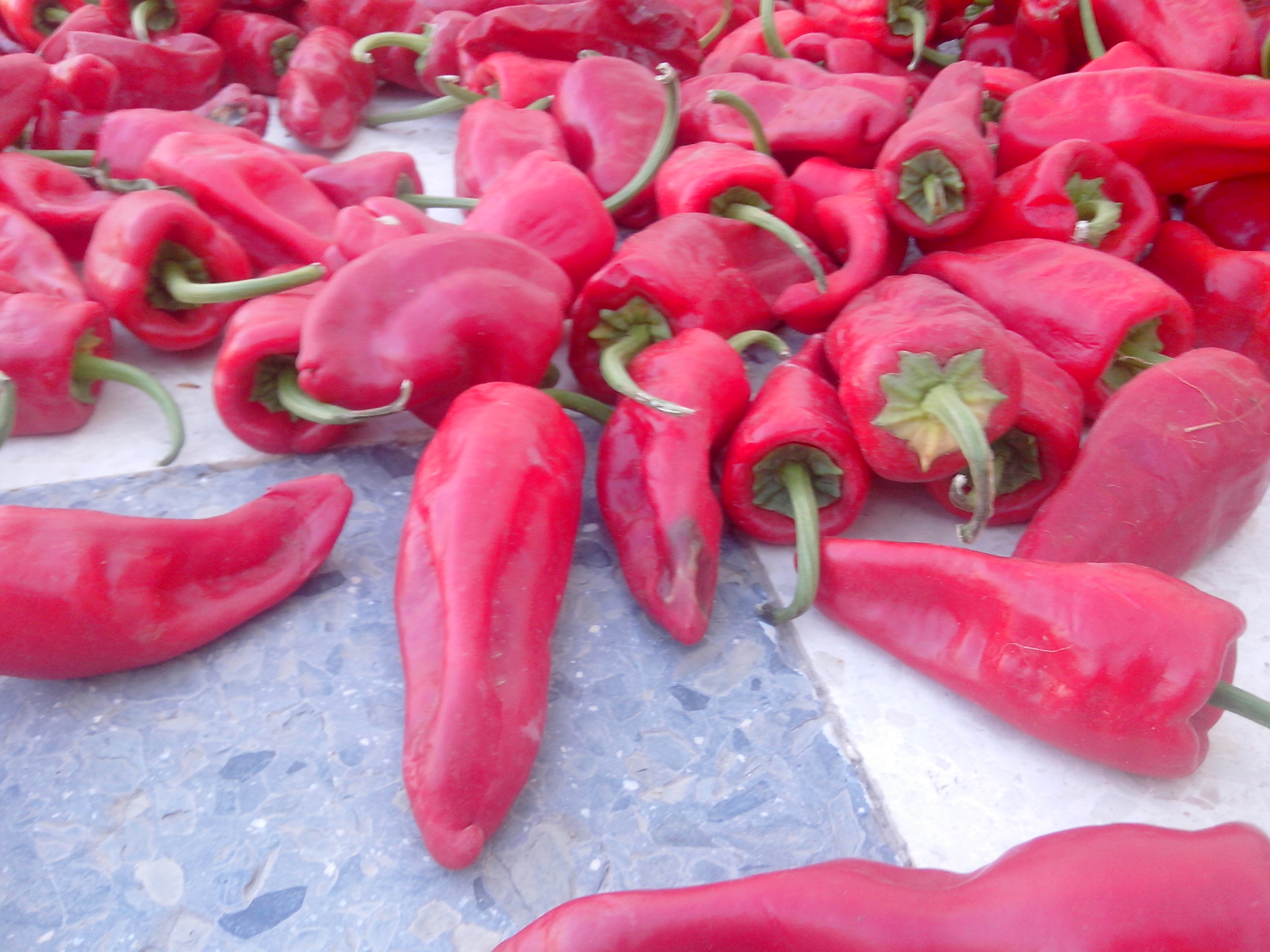
- Species: Capsicum annuum
- Cultivar: Baklouti
- Origin: Tunisia
- Heat: Medium
- Scoville scale: 1,000–5,000 SHU

The Baklouti pepper (Arabic: بقلوطي, romanized: baqlūṭī) is a cultivar of the chili pepper (Capsicum annuum) found in Tunisia. It is the main ingredient in harissa, a common sauce in Tunisian cuisine made from smoked ground pepper. It is named after the city of Bekalta.

Baklouti peppers are elongated, about 15 to 20 centimeters in length, with slightly curved pods and mild flavor.

It is also a key ingredient in Tunisian lablabi.
