= Sellou =

Moroccan dessert

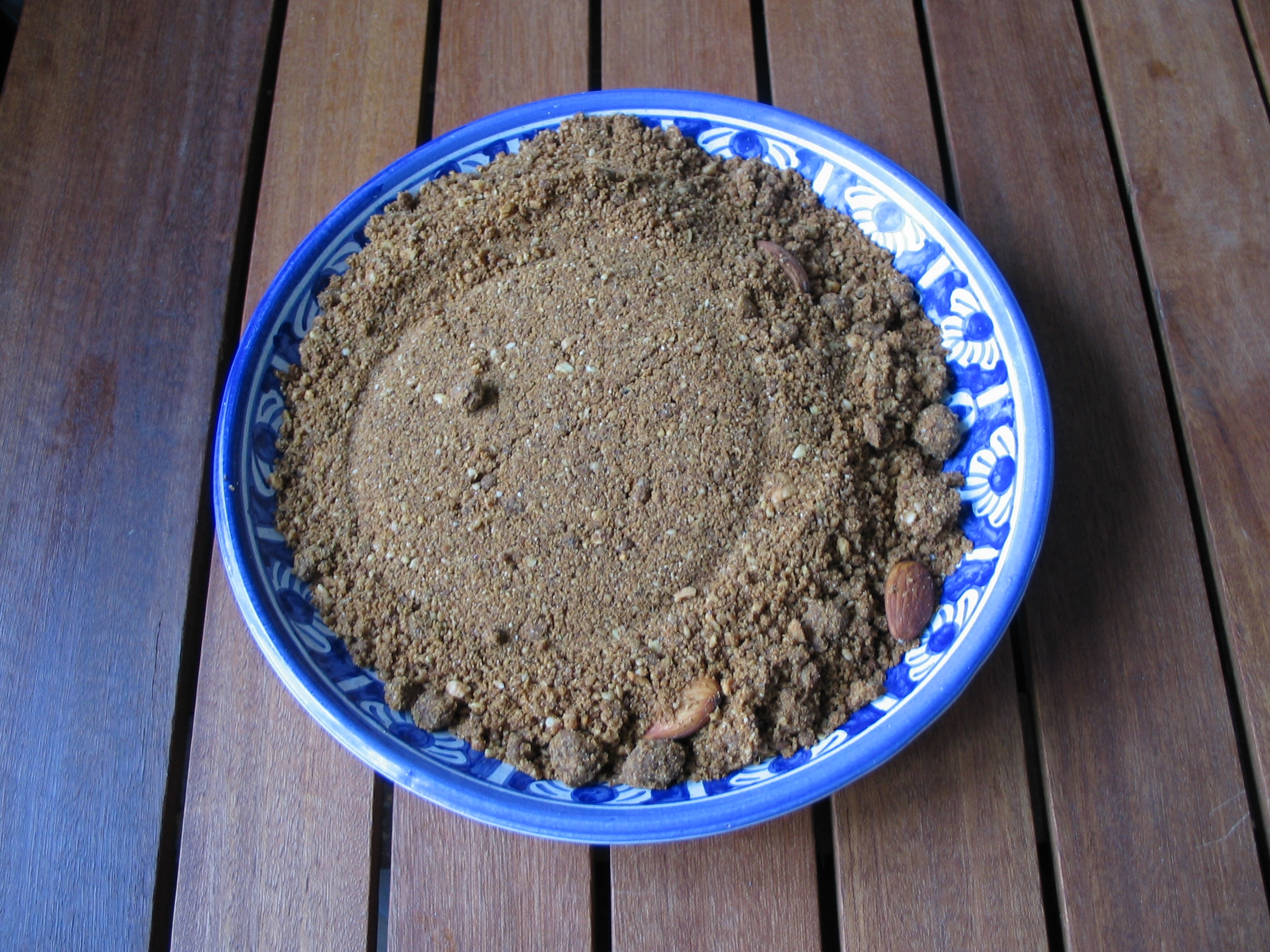
- Alternative names: Slilou, Sfouf
- Course: Dessert
- Region or state: Morocco
- Main ingredients: Flour, Nuts, Sesame

Sellou (Moroccan Arabic: سلّو səllu), also called slilou or sfouf, is a dessert consumed in Morocco. It is made from a base of roasted flour mixed with butter, honey, almonds, sesame, and possibly other nuts and spices. It is one of the important dishes in Morocco during the holy month of Ramadan.

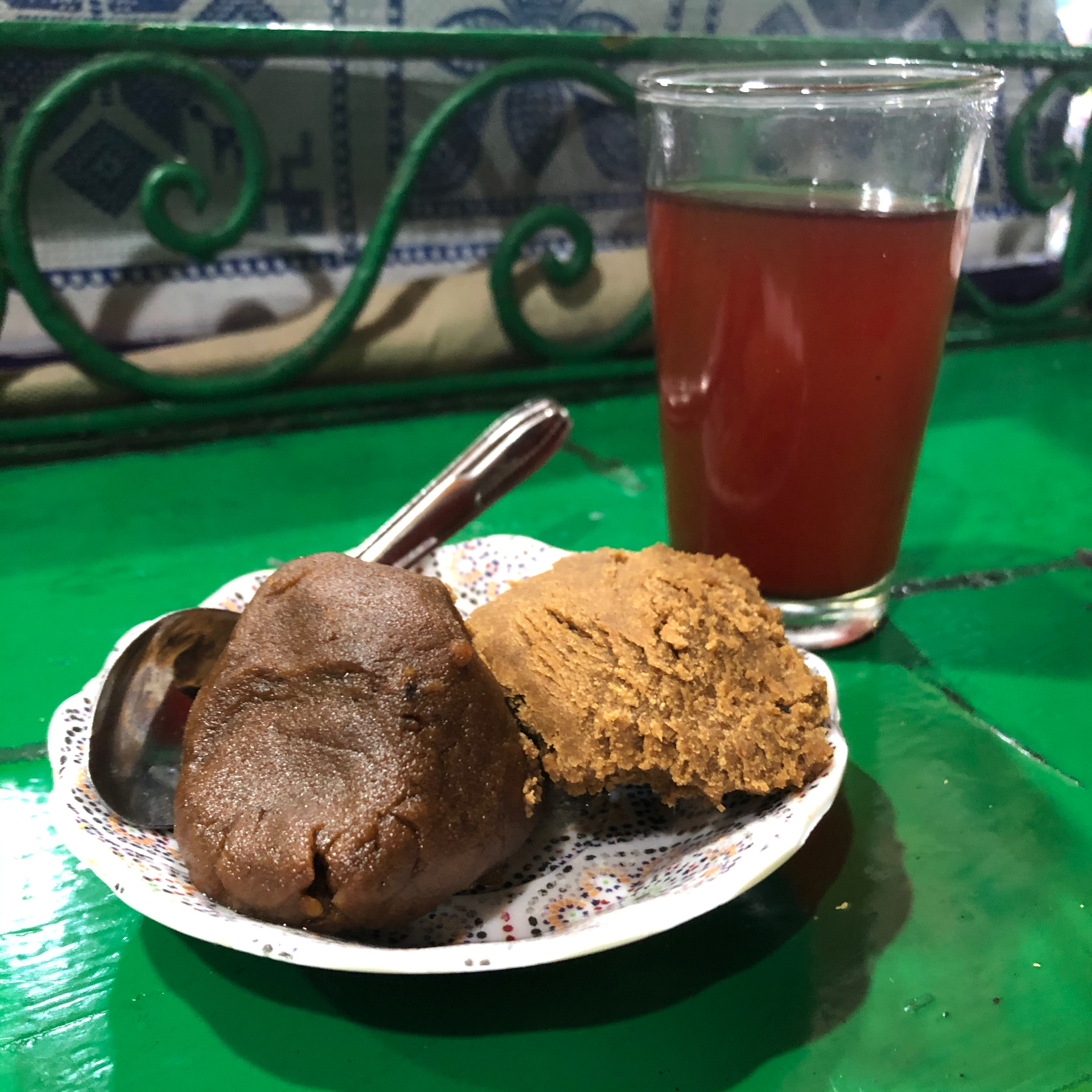
Two varieties of sellou served with khudenjal, an herbal tea based on alpinia officinarum, at Jemaa el-Fnaa in Marrakesh.

== See also ==
- Moroccan cuisine
- List of Moroccan dishes
- Gofio
