= Taktouka =

Traditional Moroccan salad dish

Taktouka (Arabic: تكتوكة) is a traditional Moroccan savory dish and spread made from tomatoes, bell peppers, garlic, toasted paprika and olive oil. Taktouka is an extremely popular dish and can be found in many a restaurant in different parts of Morocco.

== Overview ==
The word taktouka derives from the Arabic verb taktak meaning to grind. Taktouka is typically made from tomatoes, bell peppers, paprika, garlic, and various spices. It can be prepared by grinding all the ingredients together, or by cutting them in small pieces and usually takes 45 minutes to prepare the dish.

Taktouka is consumed during all seasons of the year. It is prepared in a form of a mezze, together with other dishes. A side dish, it can be served semi-warm or cold, and is typically eaten with bread.

== See also ==
- Chermoula
- Zaalouk
- Shakshouka
