= Tunisian cuisine =

Culinary traditions of Tunisia

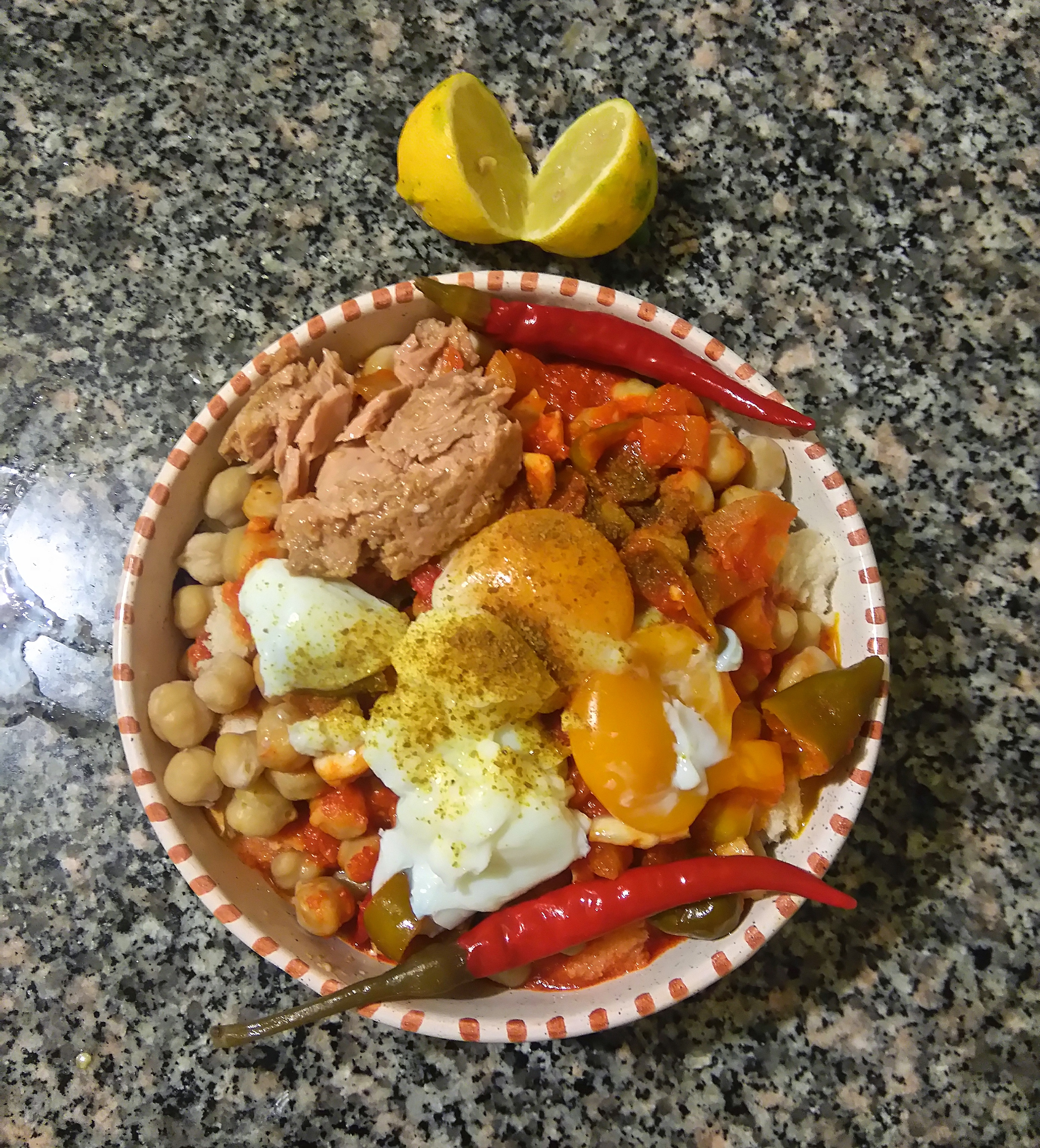
Lablabi is a thick soup made with chickpeas and garlic

Location of Tunisia

Tunisian cuisine, the cuisine of Tunisia, consists of the cooking traditions, ingredients, recipes and techniques developed in Tunisia since antiquity. It is mainly a blend of Arab, Mediterranean, Punic, and Berber cuisine. Historically, Tunisian cuisine witnessed influence and exchanges with many cultures and nations like Italians, Andalusians, French and Arabs.

Like many countries in the Mediterranean basin, the Tunisian cuisine is heavily based on olive oil, spices, tomatoes, seafood and meat. Yet, it has a distinctive spiciness that differs it from surrounding cuisines.

== Origins ==
Tunisian cuisine developed from Berbers, ancient Carthage, Rome, the Islamic conquest of the Maghreb, and the Ottoman Empire. The Tunisian cuisine has also been strongly influenced by Italian (especially Sicilian).

During its era of French colonial rule Tunisia marketed its difference to metropolitan France, effectively meaning that it played on French perceptions of "difference" (Orientalism) to sell the produce of the colonies to France. The majority of restaurants that catered to international visitors did not serve authentic colonial cuisine. Exoticness and difference were emphasized instead in souks and eateries. The European settlers who traveled to and from France shared their food experiences with the metropolitan French, but authentic Tunisian cuisine did not become integrated into the popular cuisine coloniale category of French cuisine.

== Ingredients ==
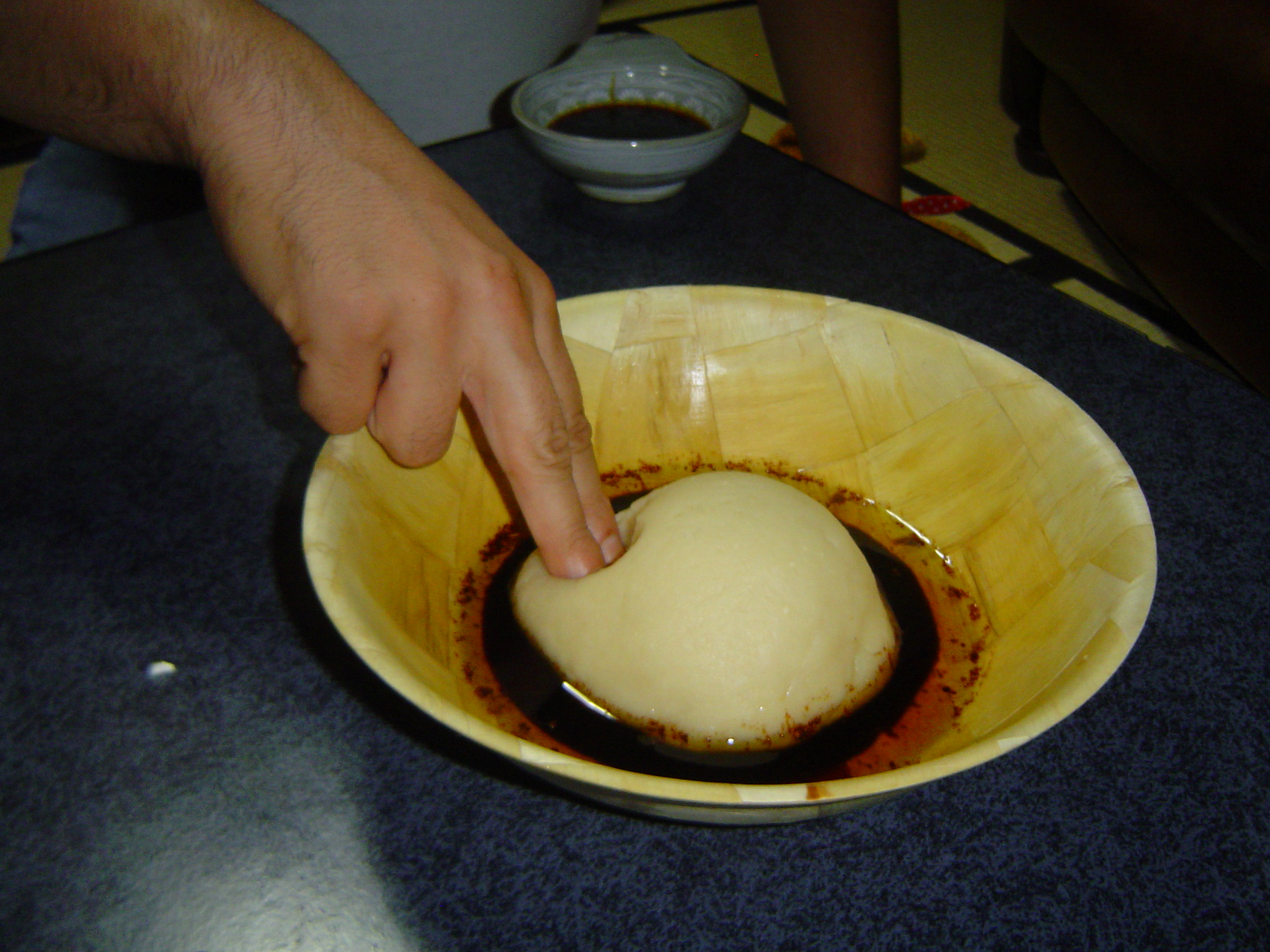
The North African dish asida is a lump of cooked wheat dough, sometimes with added butter or honey.

Merguez is a red, spicy mutton or beef-based fresh sausage.

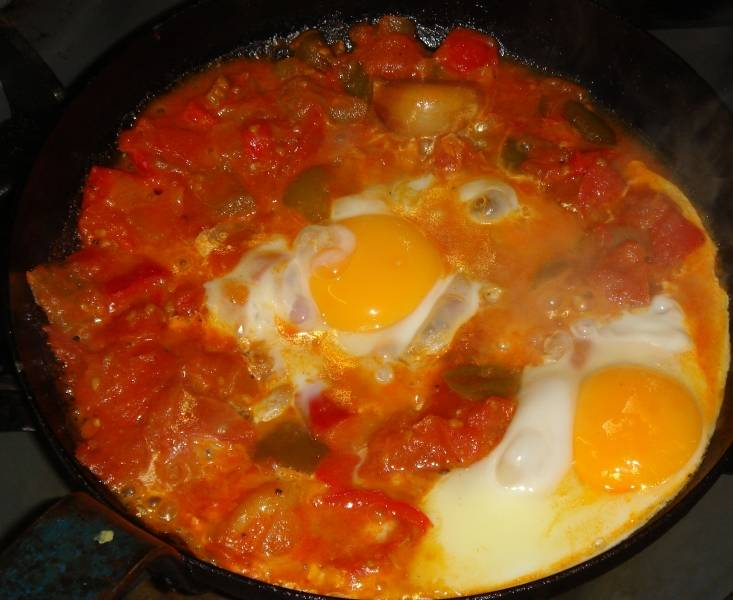
Egg shakshouka made in Tunisia

Unlike other North African cuisines, Tunisian food is quite spicy. A popular condiment and ingredient which is used extensively in Tunisian cooking, harissa, is a mix of ground chili peppers, garlic, and caraway or spices commonly sold together as a paste. It is usually the most important ingredient in different sauces and gravies. Westernised harissa mostly contains red chilies to replace black cumin, which is different from standard cumin. Other common spices include cumin or cumin seeds, garlic, caraway seeds, coriander seeds and paprika. A recipe for the sauce includes red chili peppers and garlic, flavored with coriander, cumin, olive oil and often tomatoes. Harissa has been recognized on UNESCO's list of Intangible Heritage since 2022.

Like harissa or chili peppers, tomato paste is also an ingredient integral to the cuisine of Tunisia. Tuna, eggs, olives and various varieties of pasta, cereals, herbs and spices are also ingredients which are prominently used in Tunisian cooking.

Potatoes were introduced by European settlers in the early 20th century and have become a common ingredient in traditional salads, sauces and couscous. By 1990 one of the most common homemade foods with potatoes was French fries.

Tunisian culinary ingredients include the following typical elements:

- Condiments and flavorings: harissa, rose water, orange blossom water, jasmine water and geranium water.
- Eggs.
- Farm animals: lamb, veal, beef, camel and chicken.
- Fish and seafood: tuna, squid (calamari), octopus, anchovies, eel, sardines, mackerel, red snapper, sea bream, sea snails and sea bass.
- Fruits: lemons, oranges, figs, dates, olives, apricots, pomegranates and quince.
- Herbs: parsley, coriander, mint, basil, rosemary, oregano, bay leaves and thyme.
- Nuts: hazelnuts, almonds, chestnuts, pine nuts and peanuts.
- Spices: garlic, anise, saffron, cinnamon, caraway, coriander, cumin, fennel, fenugreek, ginger, white pepper, black pepper, red pepper and cloves.
- Vegetables: onions, bell peppers, carrots, chickpeas, tomatoes, capers, celery, turnips, potatoes, chili peppers (Baklouti peppers), cucumbers and eggplants.
- Other common ingredients: honey.

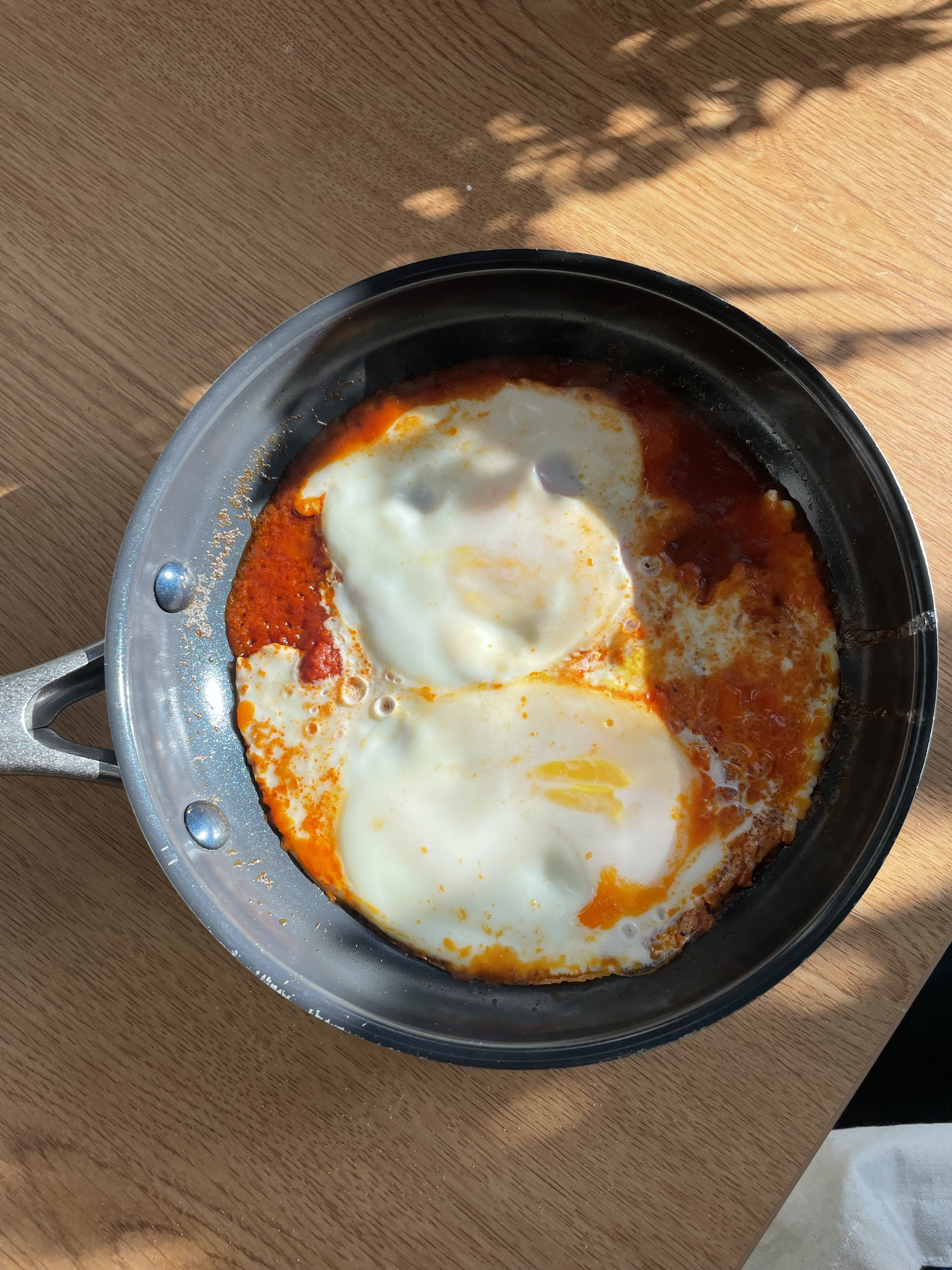
Ojja is a dish with a base of eggs, harissa, and tomato paste.

Tunisians also produce grapes, wheat, barley and orchard fruits. Once fermented they become wines, as in Chateau Mornag, a staple Tunisian wine; beers (Celtia, Berber or the Stella brand—now owned by Heineken of the Netherlands); brandy; Boukha fig liqueur, Thibarine herbal date liqueur, or other liqueurs made from pomegranates, dates, lotos (jujube), carob or prickly pears; and apple ciders. Scented waters with dark rose or blossom petals, similar to aguas frescas with flowers, have been called "scents from heaven".

Tabil, pronounced "tebel," is a word in Tunisian Arabic meaning "seasoning" (similar to adobo in Spanish) and now refers to a particular Tunisian spice mix, although earlier it only meant ground coriander. Paula Wolfert makes the plausible claim that tabil is one of the spice mixes brought to Tunisia by Muslims coming from Andalusia in 1492 after the fall of Granada. Today, tabil, closely associated with the cooking of Tunisia, features garlic, cayenne pepper, caraway seeds and coriander pounded in a mortar, then dried in the sun. It is often used in cooking beef, veal and game. Organs are traditionally staples of Tunisian cooking, such as tripe, lamb brains, beef liver and fish heads.

Due to the long coastline and numerous fishing ports, seafood has a prominent place in Tunisian cuisine. Fish can also be grilled, baked, fried, or stuffed and seasoned with cumin (kamoun). Squid, cuttlefish and octopus are served in hot crispy batter with slices of lemon, in a cooked salad, or stuffed and served with couscous.

Snails have been eaten in Tunisia since prehistoric times, as excavated mounds of shells, mixed with stone tools and artifacts from the Caspian civilization in the region of Gafsa have proven. Today, snails are still enjoyed in several regions, such as Hammamet, the central coast (Sahel) and Kairouan, but shunned in others.

== Regional cuisines ==
Tunisia has different regional aspects. Tunisian cuisine varies from north to south, from the coast to the Atlas Mountains, from urban areas to the countryside, and along religious affiliations.

For instance, the original inhabitants of Tunis (the Beldiya), do not use harissa much; they prefer milder food, and have also developed their own breads and desserts.

Closer to the Atlas mountain range, game is favoured. A diet may be composed of quail, pigeons, squab, partridge, rabbits and hare. In the Cap Bon, people enjoy tuna, anchovies, sardines, sea bass and mackerels. On the island of Djerba, where there is a dense Jewish presence, kosher food is consumed.

Despite the strong presence of fast-food and restaurants in Sfax, people from the city enjoy their traditional dishes more than anything else. Sfaxians tend to add their own touch to the Tunisian cuisine. They have staple regional dishes such as marka which is a fish soup to which Sfaxians usually add vermicelli or couscous. The soup can also be eaten with barley bread or croutons. Charmoula is a dish made of baked raisins, onions and spices, traditionally eaten with salted fish on the first day of Eid al-Fitr. Sfax is also famed for its pastries. There are two kinds of Sfaxian pastries: daily pastry (locally called hlou Arbi) like makrouth, doria, and ghraiba, and high-range pastry for weddings and special ceremonies (like baklawa, mlabbes and ka'ak warka').

The region of Gabes is famous for using hrous seasoning instead of harissa (hrous Gabsi is a paste whose main ingredients are 50% salt pickled onions, 50% dried red chili, unlike harissa which does not contain onions).

In Djerba, kosher cuisine is available as well as a myriad of restaurants offering a wide range of regional dishes like rouz djerbi and mainly seafood-based meals.

== Main dishes ==
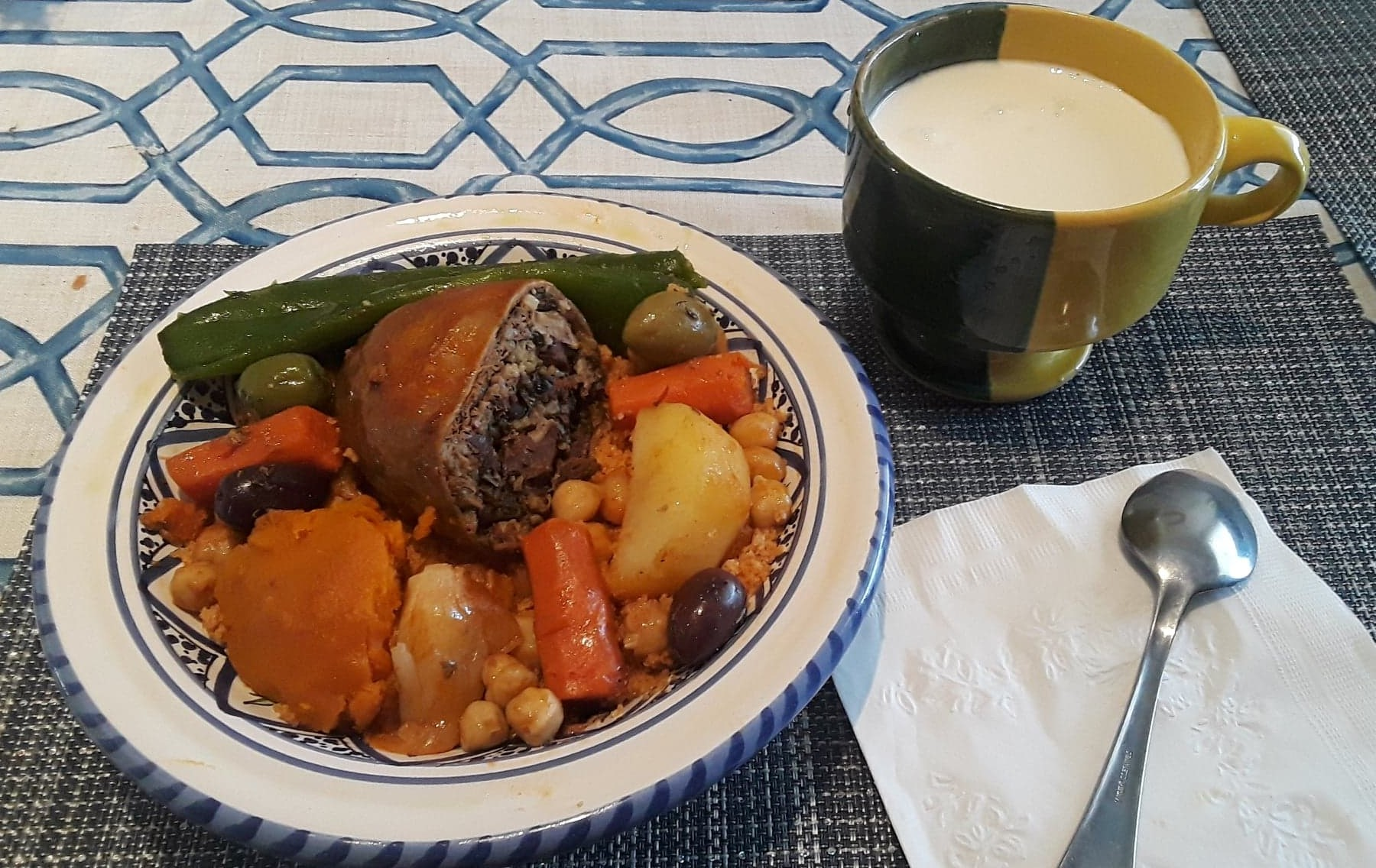
Couscous with meat Osban

=== Couscous ===
Couscous, called kosksi, is the national dish of Tunisia, and can be prepared in many ways. It is cooked in a special kind of double boiler called a kiska:s in Arabic or couscoussière in French. The couscous used is typically fine-grained. Called kosksi in the Tunisian dialect, it is a tiny granule made from steamed and dried durum wheat. It is the most popular national dish. Couscous is a dish for all events. It is frequently served in an enormous traditional bowl with bits of meat and vegetables. It is served mostly on festive occasions and large gatherings, from weddings to funerals.

Meats, vegetables and spices are cooked in the lower pot. Cooking steam rises through vents into the container above. It is layered with whole herbs such as bay leaves and covered with a fine-grain couscous. The couscous pasta is therefore cooked with aromatic steam. During the cooking process, the couscous needs to be regularly stirred with a fork to prevent lumping, much as risotto is cooked.

The word couscous (alternately cuscus or kuskus) was first noted in early 17th-century French, from Arabic kuskus, from kaskasa 'to pound', and is probably of Berber origin. The exact formation of the word presents some obscurities. The Berber root *KS means "well formed, well rolled, rounded". Numerous names and pronunciations for couscous exist around the world.

Couscous has been recognized on UNESCO's list of Intangible Cultural Heritage in 2018. This new designation by UNESCO is due to the worth of couscous and the tradition, practices, and ability that encompass it.

=== Meats ===
Preferred meats include lamb (kosksi bil ghalmi) or chicken (kosksi bil djaj), but regional substitutes include red snapper, grouper (kousksi bil mannani), sea bass (kosksi bil marqua), hare (kosksi bil arnab) or quail (kosksi bil hjall). Tunisians also love a salted form of bacon made with mutton meat in their dishes(kosksi bil qadid) Pork consumption is forbidden to Muslims in Tunisia, in accordance with Islamic dietary laws.

=== Tajine ===
Tunisian tajines or tajine refers to a kind of quiche, without a crust, made with beaten eggs, grated cheese, meat and various vegetable fillings, and baked like a large cake. The Tunisian tagine is very different from the Algerian or Moroccan dish but similar to the Italian frittata or the Egyptian eggah.

=== Seafood ===
A popular seafood specialty is poisson complet or the whole fish. The entire fish, excluding internal organs, is prepared and fire-grilled, but it can also be fried, grilled or sautéed. It is accompanied with potato chips and either mild or spicy tastira, made by frying green peppers, tomatoes, onion and a little garlic, all of which is finely chopped and sometimes served with an egg poached or sunny side up. Finely chopped fresh parsley is sprinkled on top; a drizzle of lemon juice and a pinch of sea salt complete the recipe.

In medieval Tunisia oases, a holiday dish called barkukishto was prepared with dried octopus and small fish in a vegetable broth.

== Sauces ==
Tunisian sauces, which are closer to spicy broths, are an integral part of dishes. Otherwise olive oils are often used as sauces.

Harissa or hrissa is often said to be a Tunisian sauce, but it is better described as an ingredient of Tunisian cooking or a seasoning. Harissa is made of red chili, garlic, salt, cumin, coriander, olive oil, and sometimes also caraway or mint.

Kerkennaise and mloukhia are other frequently used sauces. Kerkennaise is made of capers, olive oil, tomato, scallions, coriander, caraway, cumin, parsley, garlic, white vinegar and paprika. Mloukhia is a dark green sauce served with shredded lamb or beef.

== Dishes ==
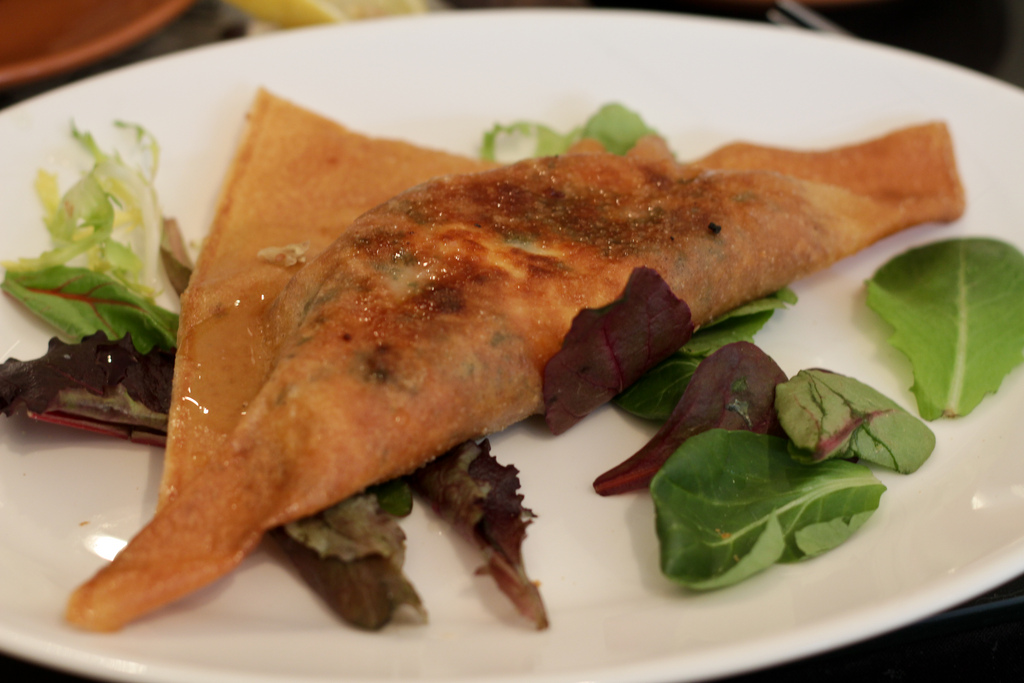
Brik, a Tunisian version of börek, is stuffed thin warka pastry, commonly deep-fried.

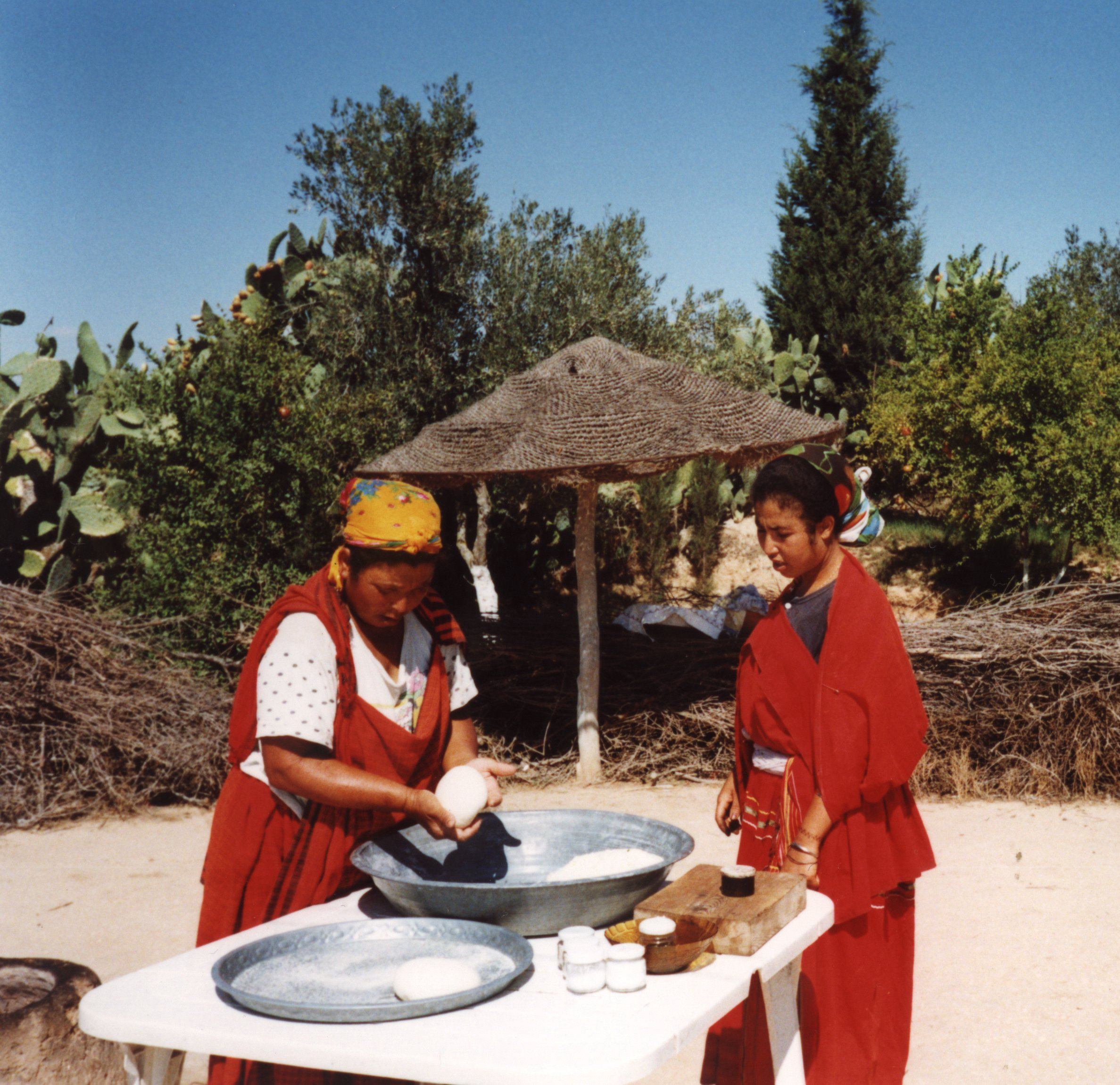
Traditional Tunisian bread being made

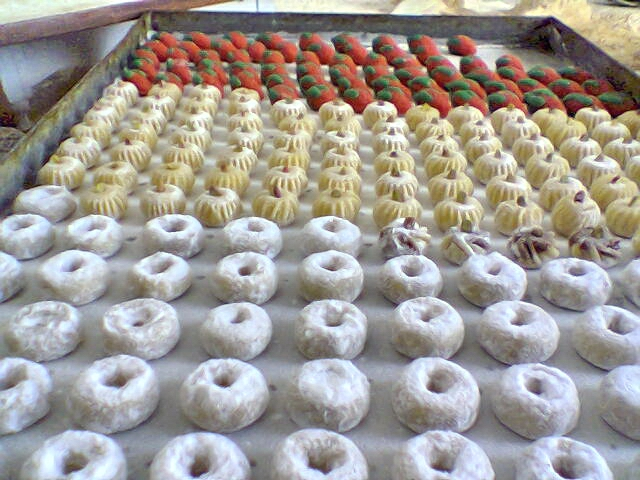
Tunisian pastries

- Asida—a sweet gruel pudding.
- Assidat zgougou—an Aleppo pine pudding.
- Baklawa—layers of thin pastry interspersed with ground pine nuts, almonds, hazelnuts and pistachios, brushed in golden butter, baked and dipped in a honey syrup.
- Bambalouni—fried sweet donut-like cake served with sugar.
- Berber-style lamb stew—A simple stew of lamb cooked with vegetables, such as potatoes and carrots, in a traditional clay pot.
- Borzgane–A sweet and savory couscous that mixes crunchy dried fruits and tender meat. It is a festive couscous prepared to welcome spring.
- Bouza—rich and sticky sorghum puree.
- Brik—tiny parcels of minced lamb, beef, or vegetables and an egg wrapped in thin pastry and deep-fried.
- Bsisa—barley pudding
- Caponata- a sweet and sour stew of eggplant and other vegetables
- Chakchouka—a vegetarian ragout similar to ratatouille with chickpeas, tomatoes, peppers, garlic and onions, sometimes served with a poached egg.
- Chorba—a seasoned broth, with pasta, meatballs, fish, and other ingredients.
- Felfel mahchi—sweet peppers stuffed with meat, usually lamb, and served with harissa sauce.
- Fricasse—tiny sandwich with tuna, harissa, olives and olive oil, bearing no similarity to the classic continental European casserole of the same name.
- Guenaoia—lamb or beef stew with chillies, okra, and spices.

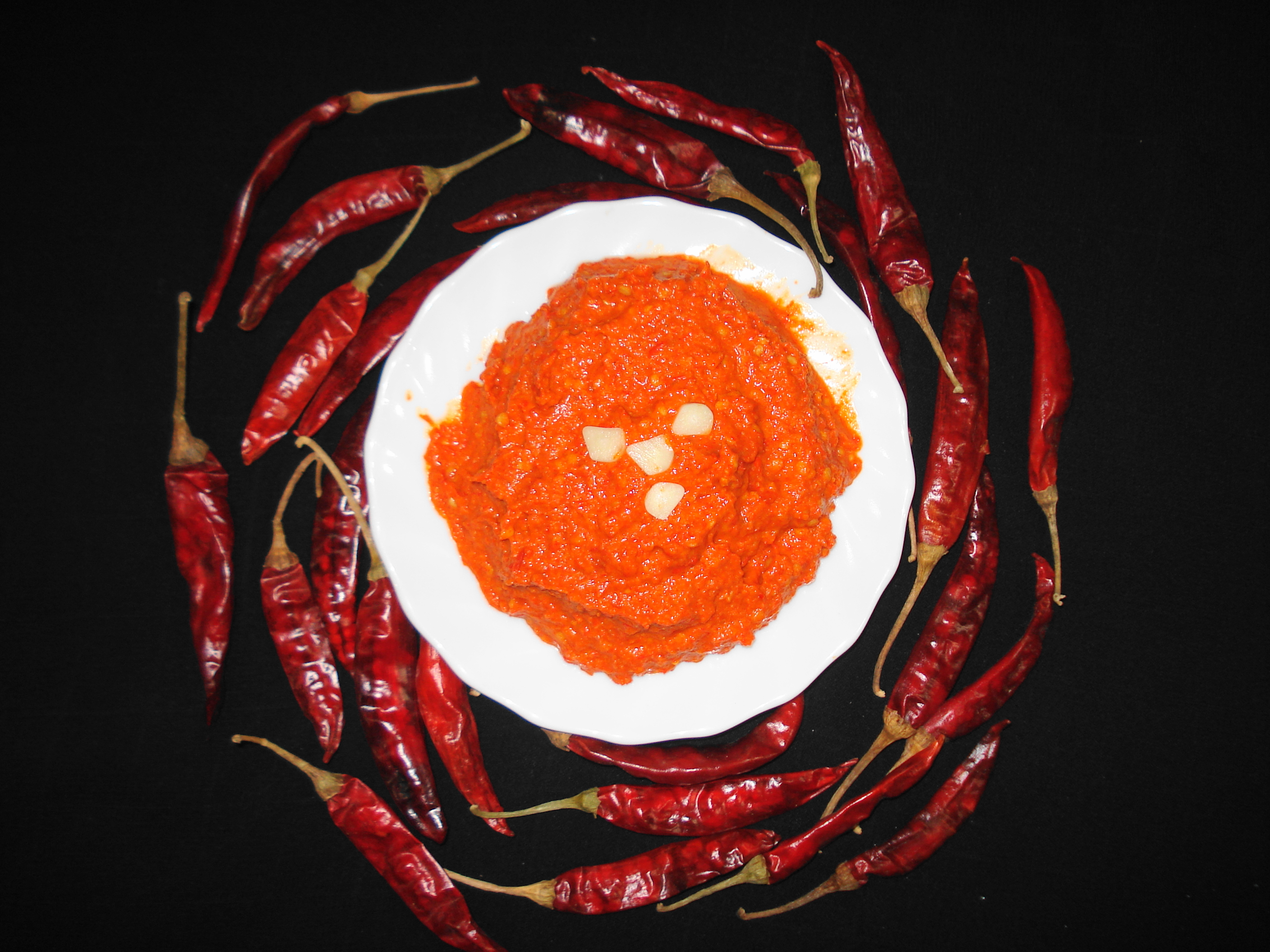
Harissa

- Houria—cooked carrot salad.
- Kamounia—a beef and cumin stew
- Khobz mbesses—Tunisian semolina bread
- Khobz tabouna—traditional oven-baked bread, not a flat or pita-like bread.
- Koucha—shoulder of lamb cooked with turmeric and cayenne pepper.
- Lablabi—rich garlicky soup made with chickpeas.
- Langues d'oiseaux or "birds' tongues"—a type of soup with pasta shaped like rice grains.
- Makroudh—semolina cake stuffed with dates or almonds, cinnamon and grated orange peel.
- Masfouf—sweetened couscous, the Tunisian version of the Moroccan seffa.
- Makboubeh—tomato and pepper stew.
- Makloub—a folded-pizza sandwich, similar to a shawarma, made from pizza dough and filled with minced chicken, cheese, salad, harissa, mayonnaise and other sauces.
- Makoud—potato and meat casserole similar to a quiche.

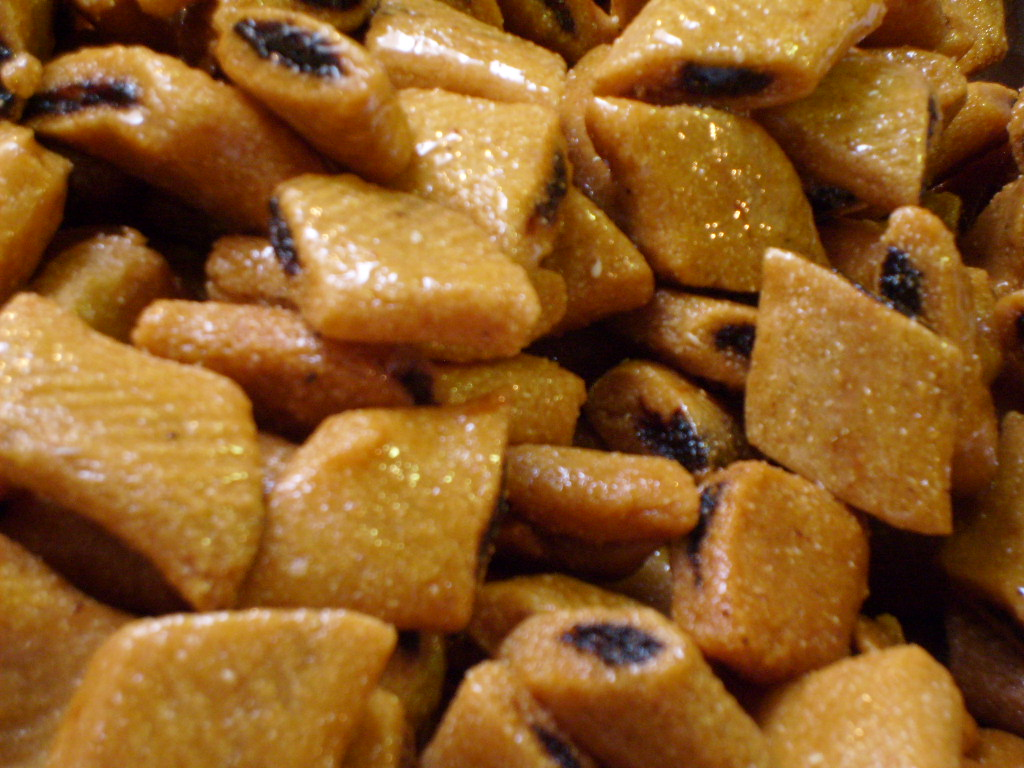
Makroudh

- Marqa—slow-cooked stews of meat with tomatoes and olives, somewhat similar in concept to the Moroccan tajine stews.
- Mechouia salad—an hors d'oeuvre of grilled sweet peppers, tomatoes and onions mixed with oil, lemon, tuna and hard–boiled eggs.

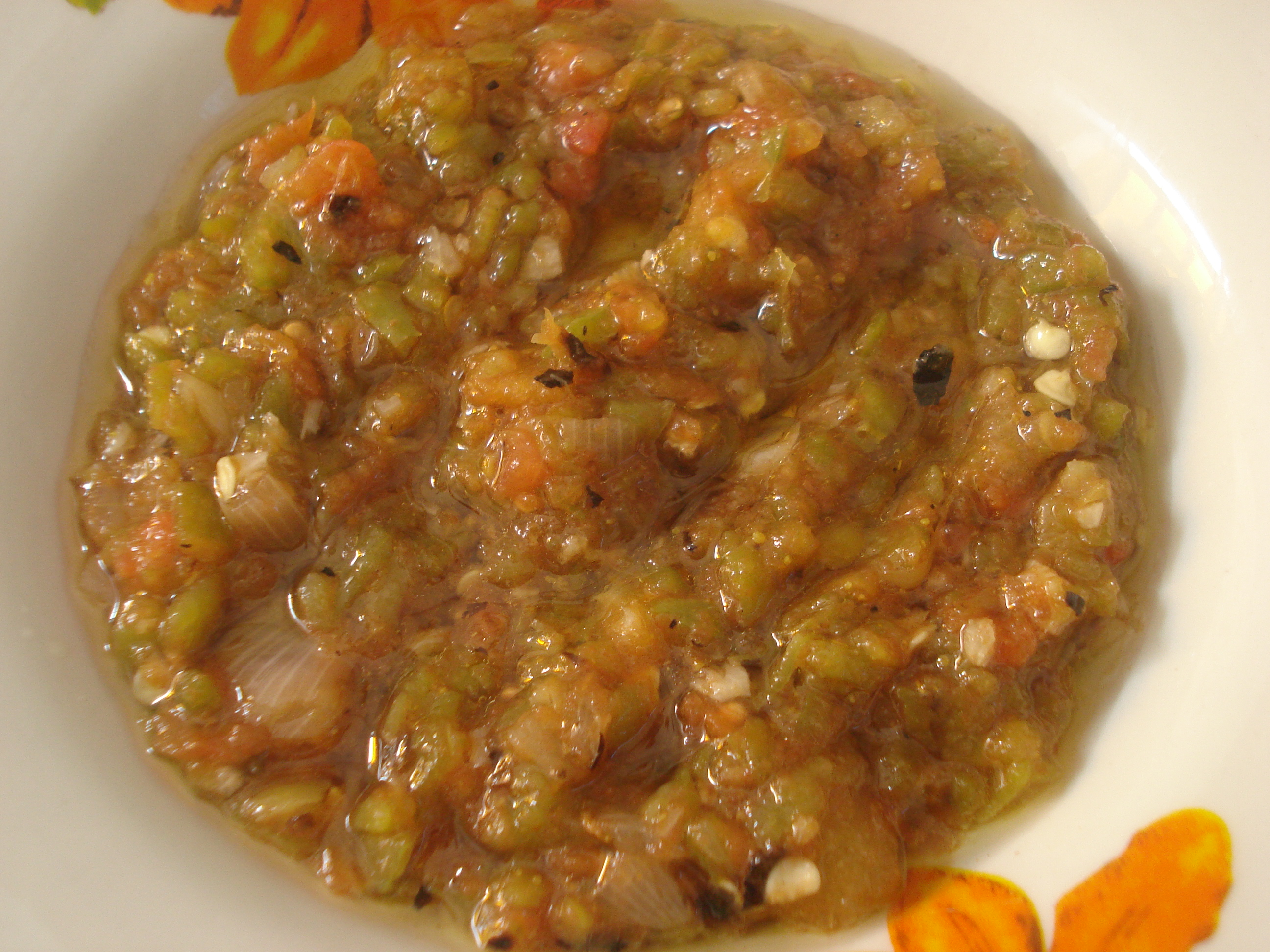
Mechouia salad

- Merguez—small spicy sausages.
- Mhalbiya—cake made with rice, nuts and geranium water.
- Mkharek – A sort of doughnut
- Mloukhia—a beef or lamb stew with bay leaves. The name is from the green herb used, which produces a thick gravy that has a mucilaginous (somewhat "slimy") texture, similar to cooked okra.
- Nwasser (or nouasser, noicer) pasta —very thin, small squares of pasta made with semolina and all-purpose flour, flavoured with Tunisian bharat, a blend of ground cinnamon and dried rosebuds.
- Ojja—poached egg dish made of tomatoes and mild green chillies supplemented with various meats and harissa. It is similar to, but not the same as, shakshouka (see below).
- Osbane—pieces of animal gut stuffed with meat, offal and chards, spinach, parsley and a small amount of bulgur or rice.
- Stuffed squid - The squid's pocket can be stuffed with a mix similar to the osbane stuffing (a majority of greens such as chards, spinach, parsley, a small quantity of sheep liver, cooked chickpeas, rice or bulgur and some onion and garlic, dry mint and harissa gathered together with raw egg) or have a stuffing exclusively made of greens, hard boiled eggs and the finely chopped calamari tentacles. There stuffed calamari can be eaten with couscous or directly in a spicy tomato sauce. They are a specialty from the central coast region, particularly Sousse and Monastir.
- Tunisian salad—diced cucumber, peppers, tomatoes, and onions seasoned with olive oil and may be garnished with olives, eggs and tuna. It is analogous to the French Niçoise salad and the Greek salad.
- Samsa—layers of thin pastry alternated with layers of ground roast almonds and sesame seeds, baked in lemon and rosewater syrup.
- Shakshouka—a vegetable medley, often with tomatoes, chili peppers, and onions, often spiced with cumin, and sometimes served with poached eggs. It is similar to, but not the same as, ojja (see above).
- Torshi—pickled turnips, marinated with lime juice.
- Yo-yo—donuts made with orange juice, deep fried, then dipped in honey syrup.
- Zitounia—ragout of veal or other meats simmered in a tomato sauce with onions, flavoured with olives.

== See also ==
- Arab cuisine
- Maghrebi cuisine
- List of African cuisines
