= Bichak =

Stuffed pastry

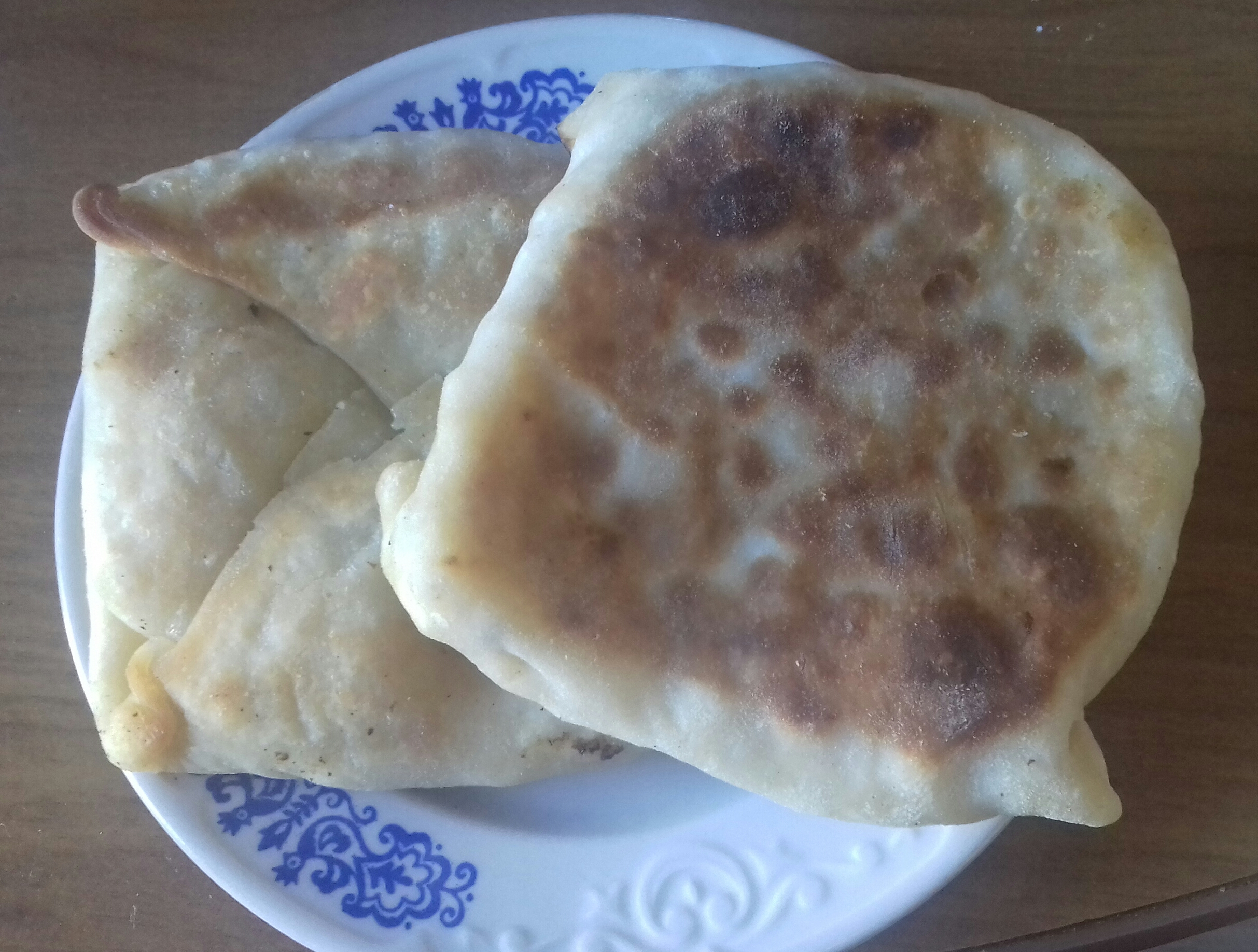
- Samarkandian Bichak with pumpkin (Tajik cuisine)
- Course: Hors d'oeuvre

Bichak is a stuffed baked or fried pastry that comes in different forms (round, triangle, quadrangle) appetizer or meal similar to a turnover, served in Central Asia cuisines including Uzbek cuisine, Tajik cuisine, Afghan cuisine, and Middle Eastern cuisine, most notably in Moroccan cuisine. It is often served during tea or coffee hour. Bichak can be stuffed with pumpkin, veggies, and jam for a sweet taste, or meat and cheese for a savory addition to lunch. Bichak is also popular because it can be prepared in large quantities. They are traditional for Rosh Hashanah and Sukkot. For kosher dairy meals, bichak stuffed with pumpkin or cheese are served with yogurt or sour cream.

== See also ==
- List of Middle Eastern dishes
- Tajik cuisine
- Uzbek cuisine
- Jewish cuisine
- Israeli cuisine
- North African cuisine
- Middle Eastern cuisine
- Samosa
- List of African dishes
- List of hors d'oeuvre
- List of stuffed dishes
