= Makroudh =

Semolina cookie with filling

Makroudh مقروض
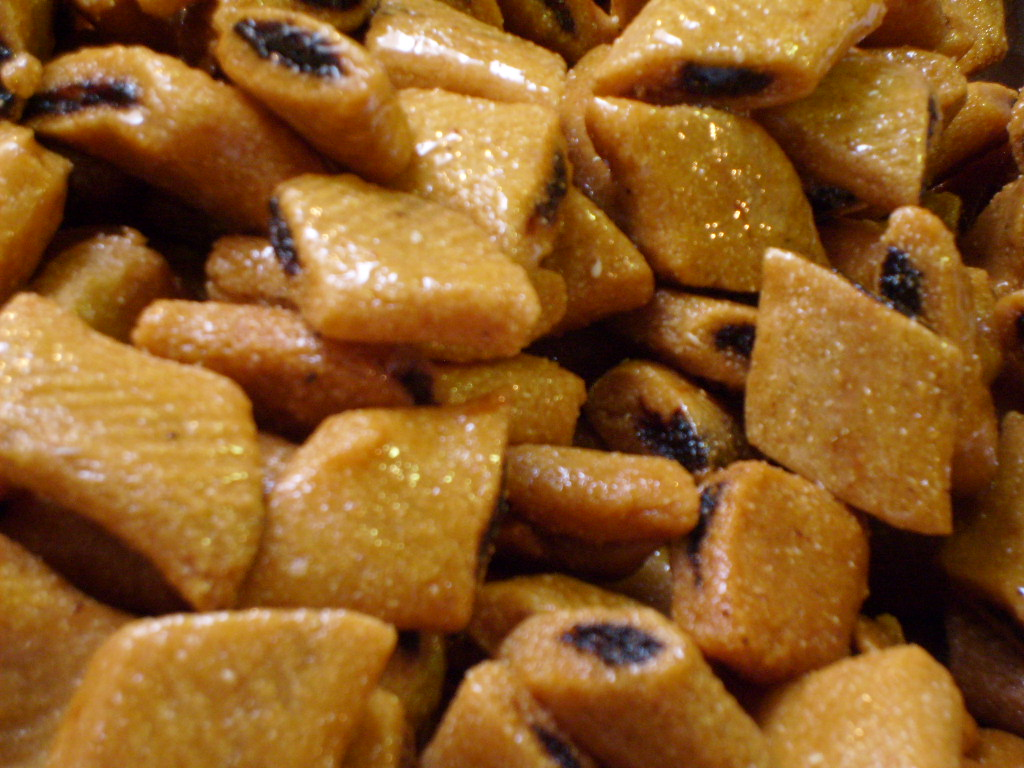
- Makroudh covered in honey
- Type: Cookie
- Place of origin: Maghreb
- Main ingredients: Semolina, dates or figs

Makroudh (Arabic: مقروض, romanized: maqrūḍ), also spelled Makrout, is a cookie from the cuisine of the Maghreb. It is filled with dates and nuts or almond paste, that has a diamond shape – the name derives from this characteristic shape.

The dough is made with semolina, which gives the pastry a very specific texture and flavor. Makroudh can be fried in oil or oven-baked.

It is popular in the Maghreb where there are many varieties of Makroudh, some of which are pastries that do not share much in common with the traditional Makroudh except the shape. In Algeria, they may be filled with almond paste. A variation with a fig filling in place of the dates is popular in Tunisia and Algeria.

Makroudh with dates and honey is also popular during Eid al-Fitr.

== History ==
According to historian Daniel Newman, the oldest known recipe for maqrud dates back to a 13th-century Arabic cookbook by Ibn Razīn al-Tujībī. The recipe describes date-filled, fried dough.

== Preparation ==
Makroudh is prepared by filling a dough made with semolina, usually using the Deglet Nour date variety. The dough is then rolled and cut into diamond-shaped pieces. The pastry is then either fried or oven-baked. The final step involves soaking the makroudh in a sweet syrup.

== See also ==
- List of Middle Eastern dishes
- List of African dishes
- Berber cuisine
- Imqaret
- Mamoul
- Hamantash
