= Hmiss =

Algerian salad

Algerian Hmiss
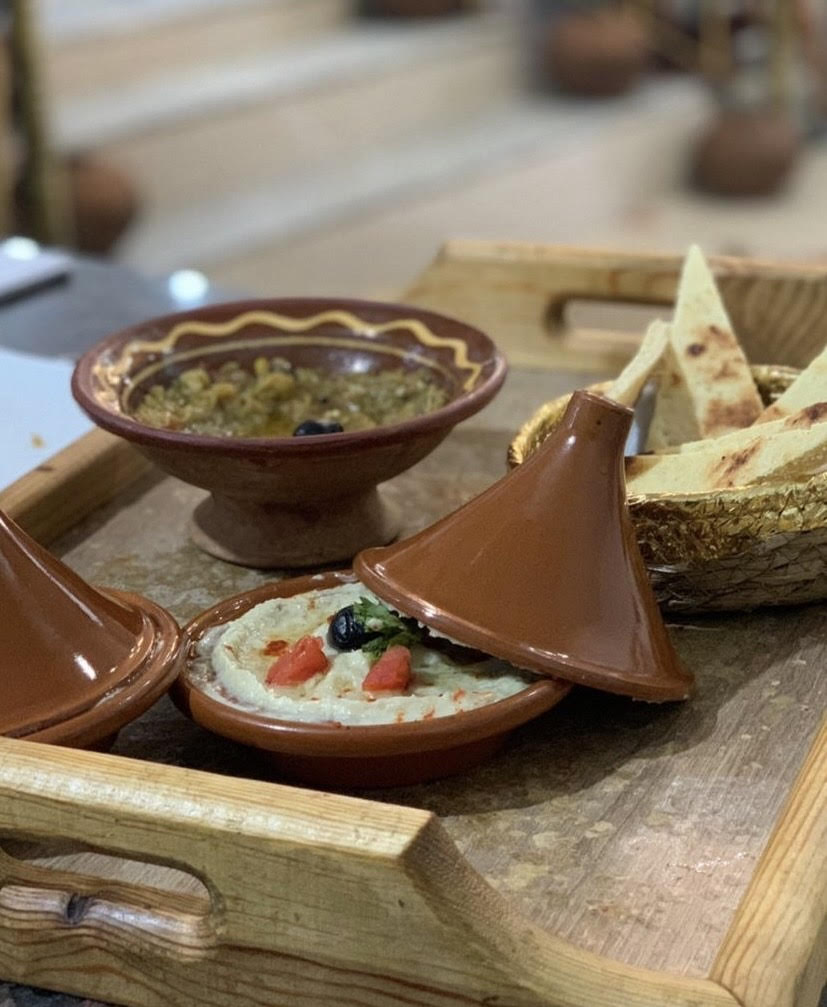
- Algerian hmiss served with kesra bread
- Alternative names: Hmiss, ifelfel, felfla, chlita, Algerian grilled salad, Algerian roasted salad
- Type: Vegetarian
- Course: Side dish
- Place of origin: Algeria
- Associated cuisine: Algeria
- Serving temperature: Hot, cold
- Main ingredients: Peppers, tomatoes, garlic
- Similar dishes: Mechouia salad

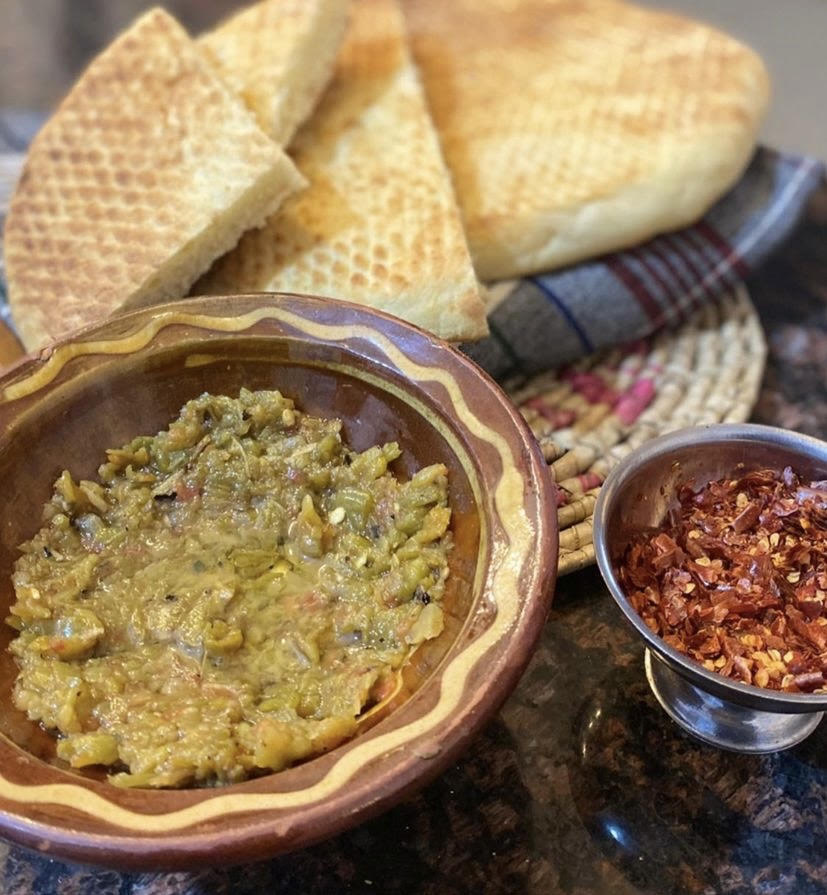
Algerian hmiss salad

Hmiss (Arabic: حميص) or ifelfel, meaning "chilli pepper" in Kabylia, or felfla and chlita in the region of Oran, is a traditional Algerian salad made from grilled peppers and tomatoes, chopped, mixed and seasoned with olive oil. The word "hmiss" means sauté in Algerian Arabic, because the vegetables have to be sautéd after grilling.

In 1975, French chef and author Marcell Boulestin labeled hmiss in his 'Boulestin's Round-the-year Cookbook' simply as the Algerian salad.

== Description ==
Hmiss is prepared everywhere in Algeria, with small differences from one region to another. Thus, in eastern Algeria, it is prepared with garlic, tomatoes and grilled peppers. It is cooked by putting the garlic, the chopped tomatoes and the oil in a frying pan for a few minutes, adding the peppers and crushing everything in a wooden mortar (the mehras). It is then served on a plate.

This entry is accompanied by aghroum or kesra bread. In Kabylia, it is prepared with the same vegetables, then seasoned with olive oil, sometimes beaten eggs are added at the end, mixed and left to cook very slowly. In Tlemcen, it is prepared with olive oil, peppers, tomatoes, garlic, eggs, coriander and it is flavored with caraway.
