= Mechouia salad =

Tunisian salad

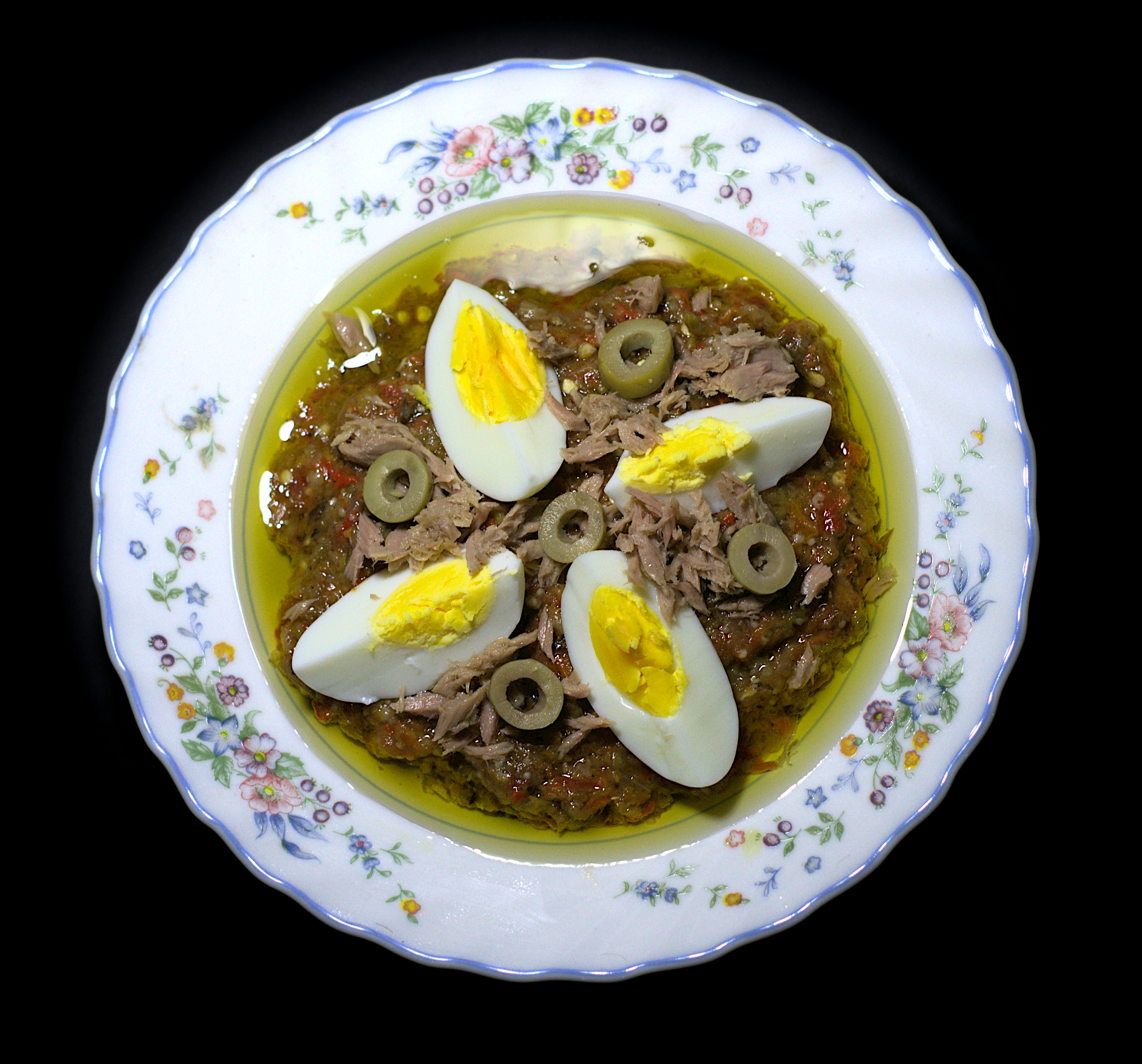
- Alternative names: hrissa, grilled salad
- Type: Salad
- Place of origin: Tunisia
- Region or state: Tunisia
- Associated cuisine: Tunisian
- Similar dishes: Hmiss

Mechouia salad (Tunisian Arabic: سلاطة مشوية, romanized: slata meshwiya, "grilled salad") is a Tunisian salad. A very popular first course dish from Tunisia, a country in North Africa that appreciates spiciness, it is especially consumed in the summer. The base is typically made of grilled vegetable, tomatoes, peppers, onions and garlic, and sometimes eggplant. These are grilled in the oven or on the stove, ground together, spiced, and then combined with tuna and olive oil. Boiled eggs are often placed on top for decoration.

== Health benefits ==
Slata mechouia is a major dietary source of the antioxidant lycopene which has been linked to many health benefits, including reduced risk of heart disease and cancer. They are also a great source of vitamin C, potassium, folate and vitamin K. Contains fiber, vitamin E and C. North Africans use it to reduce inflammation and heal infections.

== See also ==
- List of Arabic salads
