= Fricasse =

Type of savory fried pastry

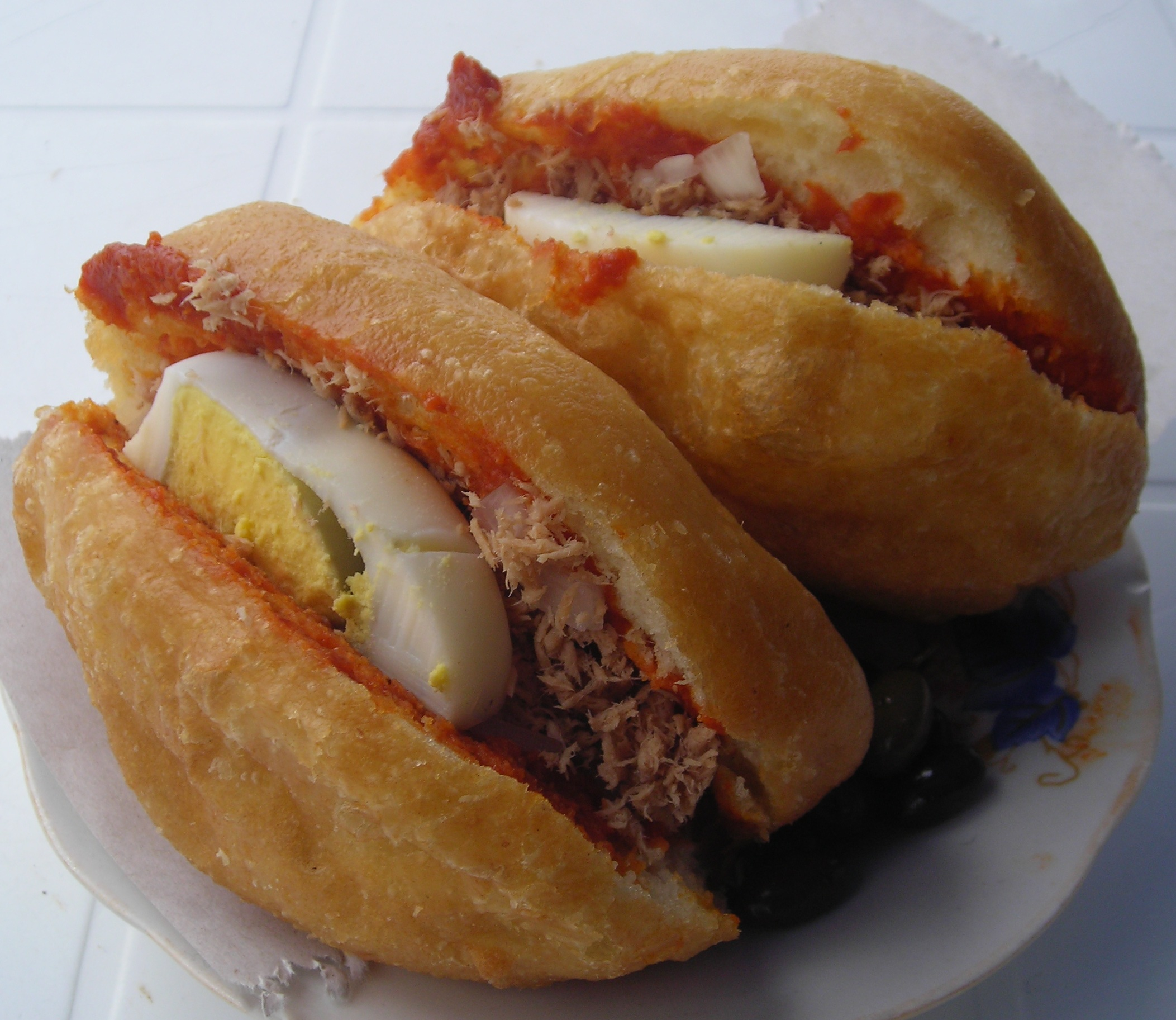
- Type: Entrée
- Place of origin: Tunisia
- Region or state: Tunisia, Israel
- Associated cuisine: Tunisian
- Food energy (per 1 (209 g) serving): 316 kcal (1,320 kJ)
Nutritional value
(per 1 (209 g) serving)
- Protein: 15 g
- Fat: 6 g
- Carbohydrate: 48 g

A fricasse (Arabic: فريكسي or فريكاسي) is a savory fried yeasted bread often filled with tuna, hard-boiled egg, olives, harissa, preserved lemons, capers and mashed potato, with turmeric as a condiment. They are usually purchased from traditional Tunisian food vendors. They can be made at home or in fast food restaurants.

Oral history claims that the recipe originates in 19th century Tunisia.

Fricasse is also widely popular in Israel, where it was introduced by Tunisian Jews, and France.

== See also ==
- Bread roll
- Mizrahi Jewish cuisine
