= Bsisa =

North African dish

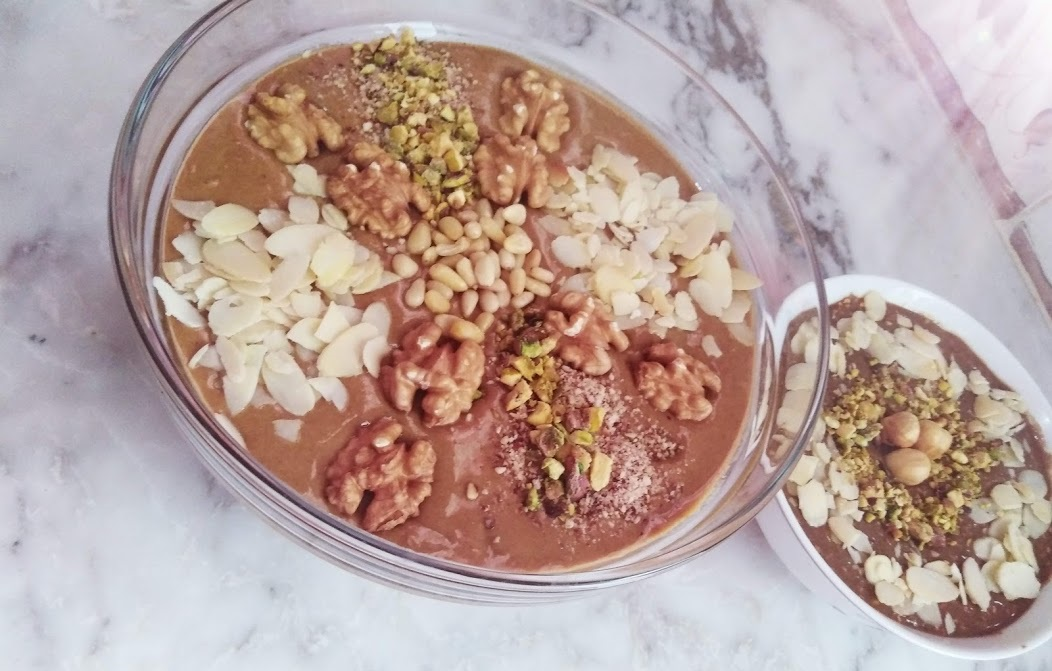
Tunisian bsisa of Msaken with grilled wheat, olive oil and dried fruits

Bsisa (Arabic: بسيسة, Berber aḍemmin, Hebrew: בסיס), also known as bsissa, is a fine powder made from roasted barley and legumes, typical in Tunisian cuisine, prepared and served either as a paste or drink. It dates back to Pharos times. Bsisa is also known and consumed throughout North Africa. Its history goes back a long way, and travellers and nomads used to take bsisa with them on their journeys since it was both full of nutritional value and easy to carry in its ground powder form.

== Ingredients ==
Bsisa is a variety of mixtures of roasted cereals ground with various spices and sugar. The herbs and spices that are added to the mixture can vary, and the mixtures can also be used as a liquid when added to milk or water, creating a strongly floured drink called rowina.

== Regional varieties ==
In Palestinian cuisine, bsisa is made with carob juice, olive oil, wheat flour, and nuts.

== Customs ==
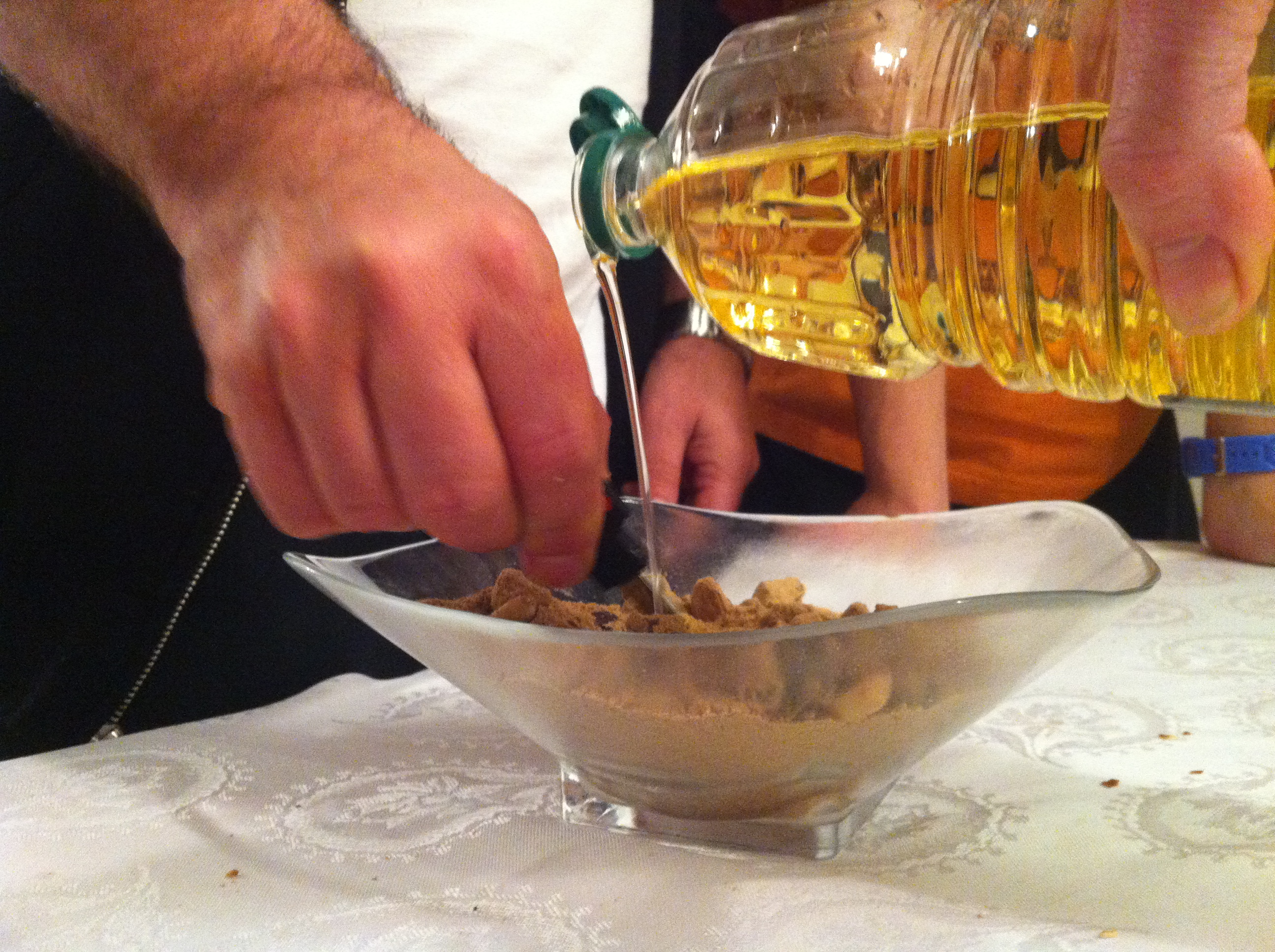
Jewish bsisa ceremony

It is eaten by Tunisian and Libyan Muslims and Jews on various occasions.

Jews consume it especially on the first day of the Hebrew month of Nisan as this is the day the Mishkan (tabernacle) was erected (in this case, the food is named bsiset el-marquma or simply bsisa). The food is a powder that consists of wheat and barley, which represents the mortar used to build the Mishkan. Additionally, the mother of the household puts her gold ring into the bsisa, recalling the gold that was also used in the building of the Mishkan. Before eating the bsisa, the father of the household blesses in Arabic while he mixes the bsisa with oil using the key to his house, recalling the oil used in the Mishkan. This symbolizes the "opening" of the 'new year' The father and family recite in turn:

Ya fetach,
Bla Neftach,
Arzekna warzek menna
Ya atai,
Bla mena!

== See also ==
- Tsampa, a similar Tibetan staple
- Arab cuisine
- Cuisine of Tunisia
- Cuisine of Libya
- Cuisine of the Sephardic Jews
