= Tabil =

Tunisian spice mixture

Tabil (Arabic: تابل) is a Tunisian spice mixture generally consisting of ground coriander seed, caraway seed, garlic or garlic powder, and chili powder. Other ingredients may also be included, such as rose flower powder, cumin, mint, laurel, cloves or turmeric. The word tabil means "seasoning" in Tunisian Arabic, and once referred to coriander by itself.

The spice mixture is used, often in combination with harissa in a variety of dishes including meat or fish stews, and vegetable dishes.

== See also ==
- List of Middle Eastern dishes
- List of African dishes
