= Lablabi =

Tunisian dish based on chickpeas

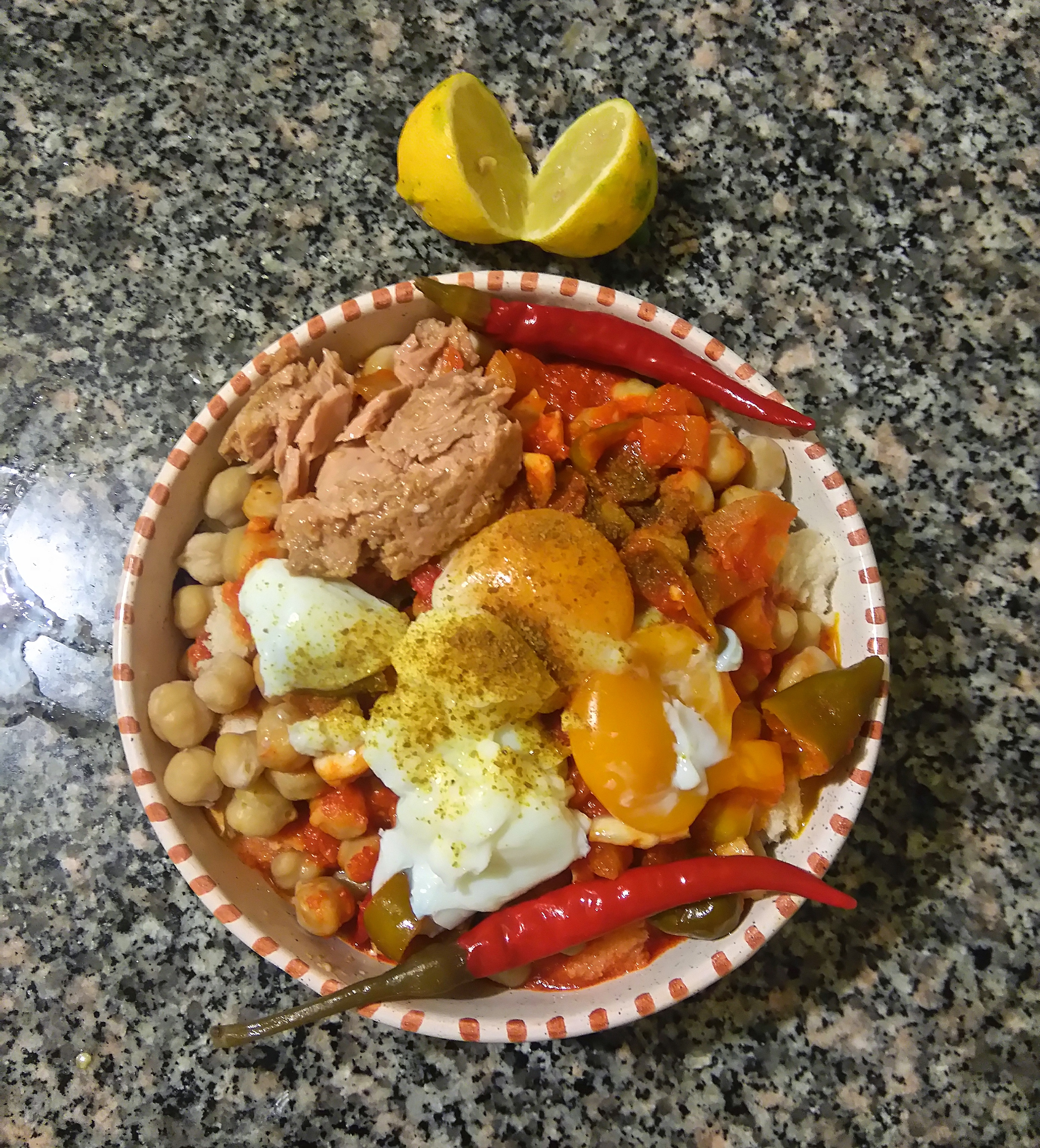
- Lablabi with the eggs in a Tunis restaurant
- Type: Soup
- Course: Main course
- Place of origin: Tunisia
- Region or state: North Africa
- Associated cuisine: Tunisian cuisine
- Serving temperature: Hot
- Main ingredients: Chickpeas, garlic, cumin, stale bread
- Ingredients generally used: Olive oil, harissa, eggs, capers, tuna, lemon juice, Baklouti pepper
- Variations: Hergma (with cow's trotters), Bizerte lablebi (sandwich style)
- Food energy (per serving): 353 kcal (1,480 kJ)
Nutritional value
(per serving)
- Protein: 16 g
- Fat: 9 g
- Carbohydrate: 54 g
- Similar dishes: Lablabi (Iraqi)

Lablabi or lablebi (لبلابي) is a traditional Tunisian dish based on chickpeas in a thin garlic- and cumin-flavored broth, served over small pieces of stale crusty bread. It is a staple comfort food in Tunisia and is also found in variations in Iraq and other parts of the Middle East.

The name may derive from the Turkish word leblebi, meaning grilled chickpeas.

== Variations ==
- Hergma: A traditional version made with cow's trotters, adding richness to the broth.
- Bizerte Lablabi: A sandwich variation popular in northern Tunisia, made by stuffing a baguette with the chickpea mixture and toppings.
- Iraqi Lablabi: A simple dish of chickpeas in broth.

== Cultural significance ==
Lablabi was originally a winter breakfast dish, but it is now enjoyed at any time of the day, year-round. It is particularly popular among young people as a late-night meal, often consumed to mitigate the effects of alcohol after a night out.

== Nutritional information ==
Nutrient (Per 100g)	Value
Calories	353
Protein	16g
Fat	9g
Carbohydrates	54g
Fiber	12g
Sugar	2g
Sodium	480mg

== See also ==
- List of Middle Eastern dishes
- List of African dishes
- List of legume dishes
- Berber cuisine
