= Harissa =

Tunisian hot chili pepper paste

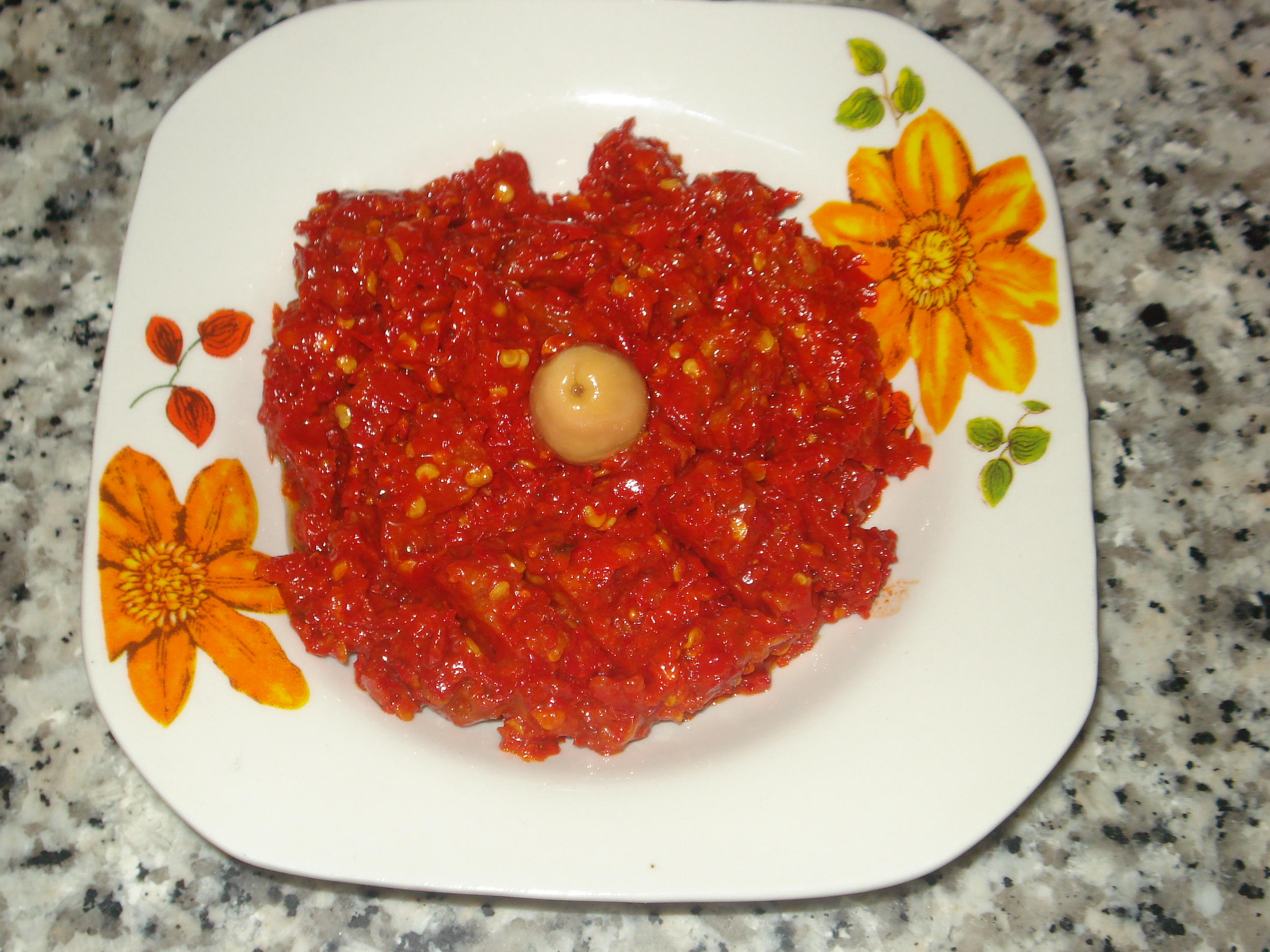
- Type: Paste
- Region or state: Tunisia
- Main ingredients: Red peppers
- Ingredients generally used: Baklouti pepper

Harissa (Arabic: هريسة, romanized: harīsa, from Tunisian Arabic) is a Tunisian hot chili pepper paste. Peppers in the country were first grown in the Cape Bon Peninsula, birthplace of the condiment, with Nabeul famous for being the primary center for its production. The main ingredients are roasted red peppers, Baklouti peppers, spices and herbs such as garlic paste, caraway seeds, coriander seeds, cumin and olive oil to carry the oil-soluble flavors.

Tunisia is the biggest exporter of prepared harissa and UNESCO lists it as part of Tunisia's Intangible Cultural Heritage. The origin of harissa goes back to the importation of chili peppers into Tunisian cuisine by the Columbian exchange, presumably during the Spanish occupation of Hafsid Tunisia between 1535 and 1574.

== Etymology ==
The word derives from the Arabic root harasa (Arabic: هرس, lit. 'to pound, to break into pieces'), referring to pounding chilis, a Maghrebi tool traditionally used to make the paste is called Mehraz, and similar names are used for other pastes in Maghrebi cuisine, such as "Hrous" which uses the same harissa recipe with a slight difference in the peppers, which are green.

== Consumption and culinary traditions ==
=== Algeria ===
In Algeria, harissa is commonly added to soups, stews, and couscous. Harissa paste can also be used as a rub for meat or eggplants. Another significant producer is Algeria's Annaba Province, which is also a significant consumer. According to cookbook author Martha Rose Shulman, premade harissa tastes rather different from that which is served in Tunisian and expatriate restaurants.

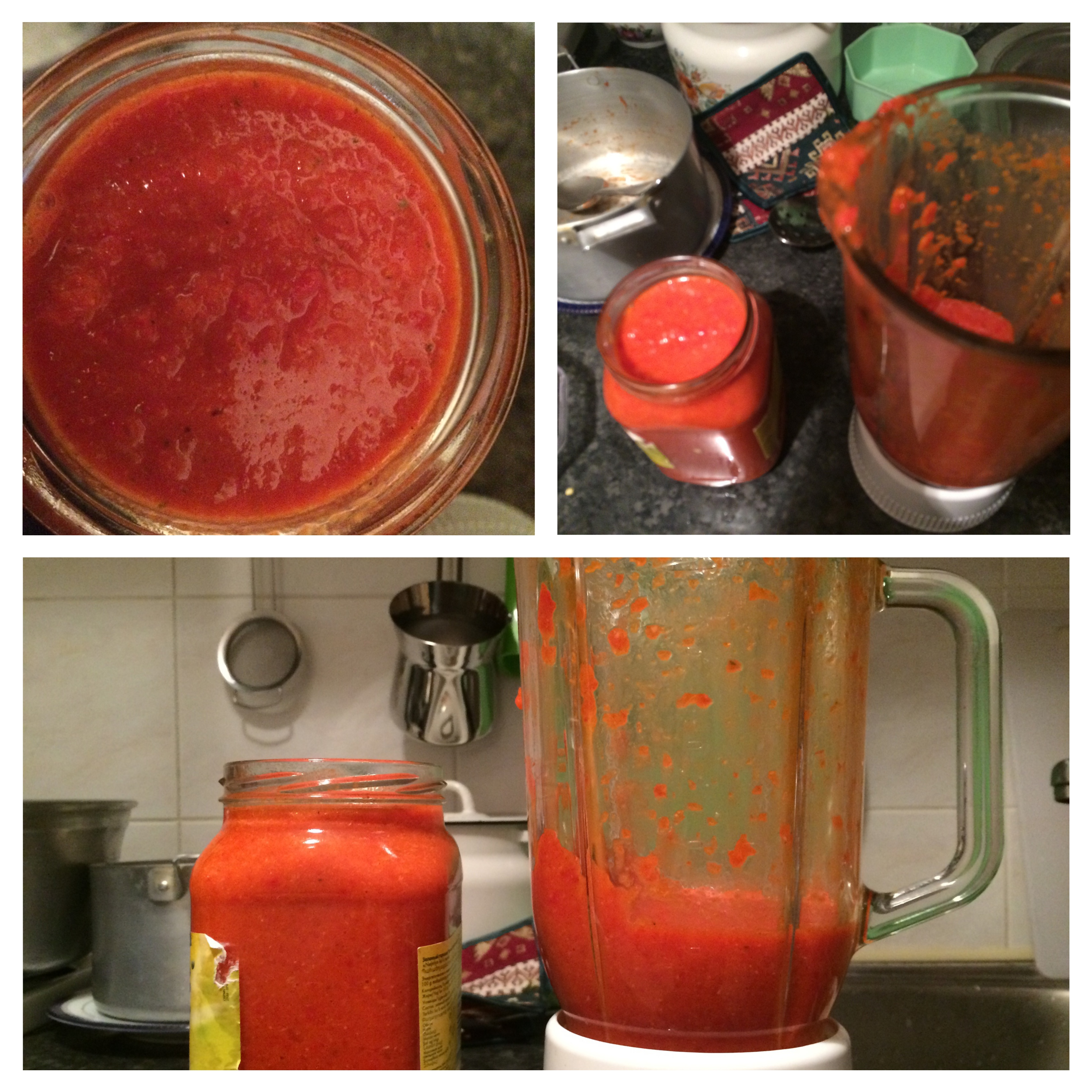
Homemade harissa

=== Israel and Libya ===
In Israel, harissa is a common topping for sabich and shawarma.

Filfel chuma (Hebrew: פלפלצ'ומה), also spelled pilpelshuma, literally "pepper garlic", is the typical chili sauce of Libyan Jewish cuisine which is very similar to harissa. It comes from Libyan cuisine, where it is known as maseer (Arabic: المصير or مسّير حار mseyer). It is also known by other names such as filfil mukhalal (فلفل مخلل) and filfil makbos (فلفل مكبوس). It is made from powdered sweet and hot peppers and crushed garlic. Other ingredients, such as ground caraway seeds, cumin, lemon juice, and salt are sometimes added. It serves as a condiment and as an ingredient in dishes such as salads, meat, fish, legumes and rice, and egg dishes such as shakshouka.

=== Morocco ===
Moroccan cuisine has also adopted harissa, and some Moroccans use it as a side condiment for tagines, or sometimes mixed into dishes. Moroccans tend to have a preference for less seasoned harissa as it allows them to incorporate it into dishes of different flavor profiles.

=== Tunisia ===
Harissa, knowledge, skills and culinary and social practices
- UNESCO Intangible Cultural Heritage
- Country: Tunisia
- Reference: 01710
- Region: Arab States

Inscription history
- Inscription: 2022 (17th session)
- List: Representative

Recipes for harissa vary according to the household and region. Variations can include the addition of fermented onions or lemon juice. Prepared harissa is sold in jars, cans, bottles and tubes. Harissa is sometimes described as "Tunisia's main condiment", even "the national condiment of Tunisia", or at least as "the hallmark of Tunisia's fish and meat dishes". In Tunisia, harissa is used as an ingredient in a meat (poultry, beef, goat, or lamb) or fish stew with vegetables, and as a flavoring for couscous. It is also used for lablabi, a chickpea soup, and fricasse.

Tunisia is the biggest exporter of prepared harissa. In 2006, the Tunisian production of harissa was 22,000 tonnes, incorporating about 40,000 tonnes of peppers. Tunisian harissa is often made with Baklouti peppers and chilis grown around Nabeul and Gabès, which are relatively mild, scoring 4,000–5,000 on the Scoville scale. On December 1, 2022, UNESCO added "Harissa, knowledge, skills and culinary and social practices" as part of Tunisia's Intangible Cultural Heritage.

== Nabeul Harissa Festival ==
The Nabeul Harissa Festival is an annual event organized in the coastal city of Nabeul, heart of the pepper-growing Cape Bon Peninsula, celebrating harissa as a national icon of Tunisian cuisine. It is usually held in October, aligning with the end of the Baklouti pepper harvest season. Artisanal markets showcase the traditional making of the paste with sun-dried peppers, garlic, and spices like caraway and coriander while highlighting local women's role in the preservation of the condiment.

== See also ==
- Zhug
- Muhammara
- Ajika
- Chermoula
- Tabil
- Awaze
- Gochujang
- Erős Pista
- Biber salçası
- List of sauces
- Seasoning
- Ajvar
