= Mrouzia =

Sweet and salty dish of meat tajine

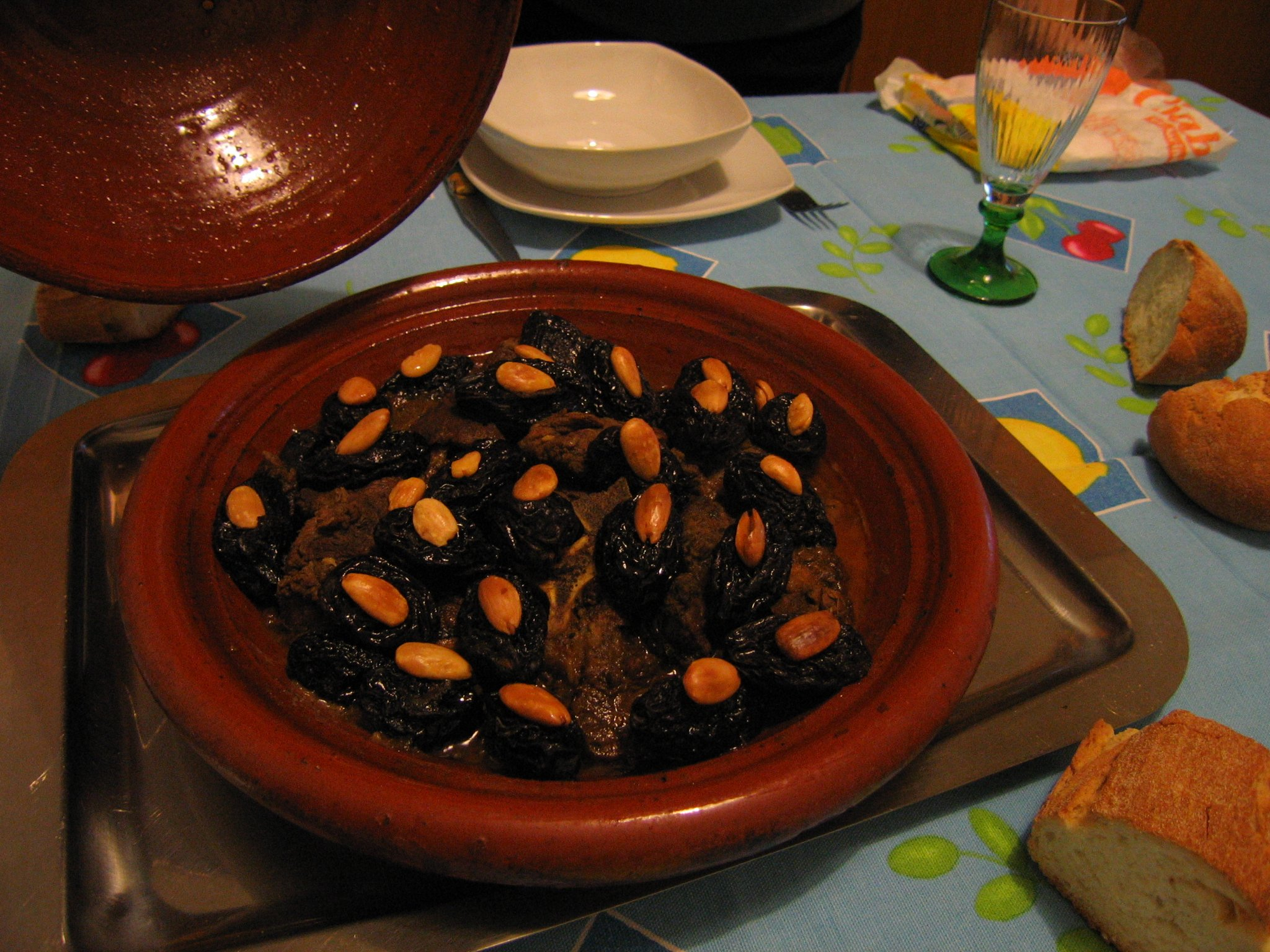
Mrouzia tajine

Mrouzia (Arabic: المروزية), is a dish of the Maghribi cuisine It is a sweet and salty meat tajine, combining a ras el hanout blend of spices with honey, cinnamon and almonds.

This dish is attested in the XIII century Anonymous Andalusian cookbook as being a dish from Ifriqiya and Egypt.

It is also known as m'assal in Rabat.

This tagine is one of the traditional dishes of the Eid al-Adha Muslim festival (Festival of Sacrifice). It is often made of lamb from animals ritually sacrificed during the festival.

== See also ==
- Moroccan cuisine
- Algerian cuisine
- Tunisian cuisine
