= Meskouta =

Traditional algerian cake

Meskouta is a traditional cake from Algeria also spread in morocco. There are different variations of meskouta cakes based on flavors like orange, lemon and vanilla. It was traditionally made in the winter, when oranges ripened. Meskouta is typically served with hot mint tea or coffee.
