= Chermoula =

Relish from Maghrebi cuisine

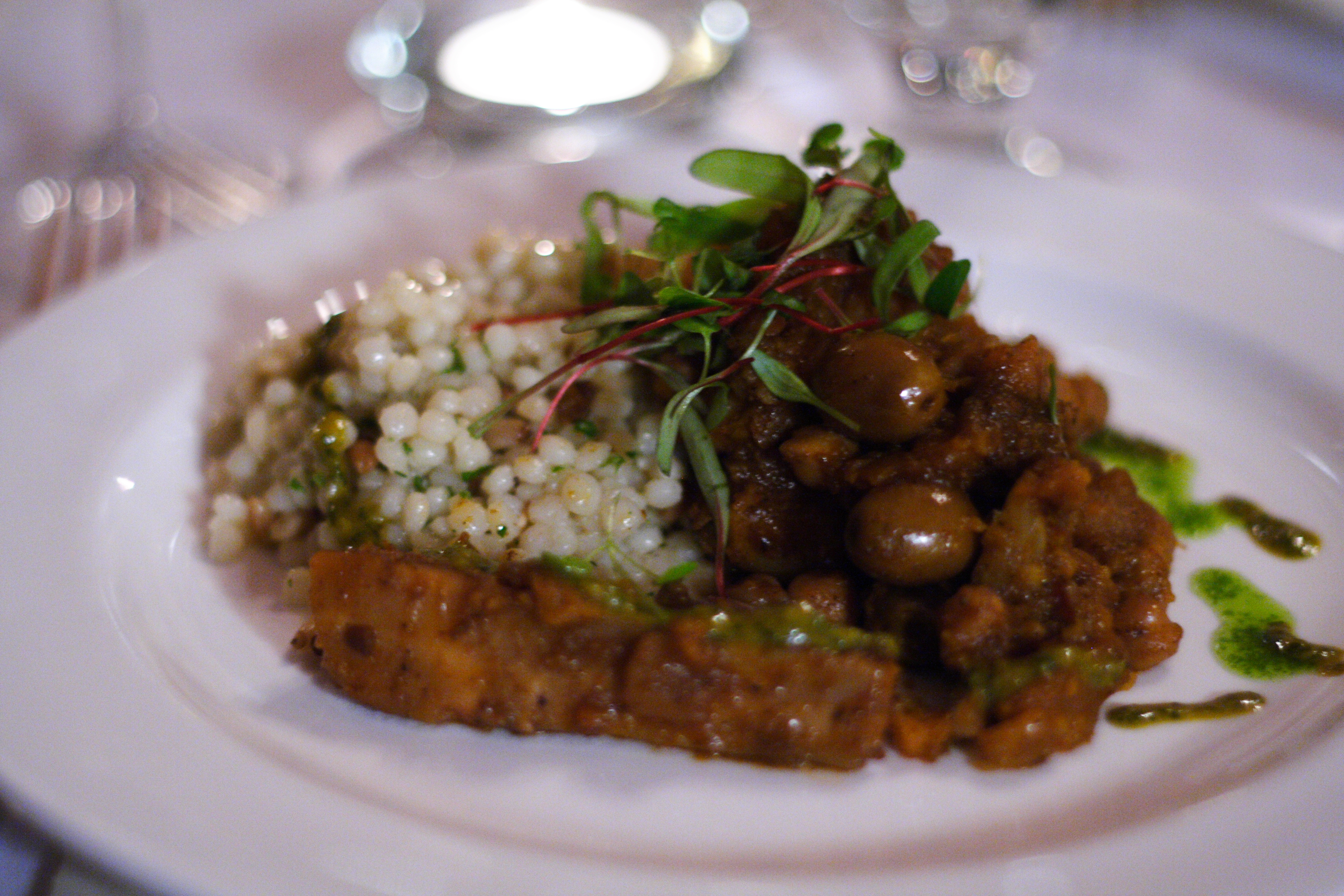
- Course: Main
- Region or state: Maghreb
- Main ingredients: Cumin

Chermoula (Berber: tacermult or tacermilt, Arabic: شرمولة) or charmoula is a marinade and relish used in Algerian, Libyan, Moroccan and Tunisian cooking. It is traditionally used to flavor fish or seafood, but it can be used on other meats or vegetables. It is somewhat similar to the Latin American chimichurri.

== Ingredients ==
Common ingredients include garlic, cumin, coriander, oil, lemon juice, and salt. Regional variations may also include preserved lemons, onion, ground chili peppers, black pepper, saffron, and other herbs.

== Varieties ==
Chermoula recipes vary widely by region. In Sfax, Tunisia, chermoula is often served with cured salted fish during Eid al-Fitr. This regional variety is composed of dried dark raisin purée mixed with onions cooked in olive oil and spices such as cloves, cumin, chili, black pepper, and cinnamon.

A Moroccan version comprises dried parsley, cumin, paprika, and salt and pepper. In Libya, it is known as charmoulet el-hout and refers to an onion-based relish or marinade typically served with fried fish or seafood. It is made from sliced onions, tomato paste, garlic, parsley, vinegar, green chilies, and spices such as red pepper, black pepper, and cumin (locally known as kammun hout). Commonly prepared during the summer, it accompanies fish that has been marinated, coated in flour, and fried. It should not be confused with a Libyan salad of the same name, which resembles a salsa and consists of finely diced tomatoes, cucumber, onion, jalapeño, fresh herbs, and a tangy olive oil dressing.

== See also ==
- List of Middle Eastern dishes
- Harissa
- Tunisian cuisine
- Moroccan cuisine
- North African cuisine
- List of African dishes
