= Merguez =

Algerian seasoned sausage

- Alternative names: مرقاز
- Type: Sausage
- Place of origin: Algeria
- Associated cuisine: Maghreb
- Invented: 12th century
- Main ingredients: Lamb or beef
- Ingredients generally used: Cumin and chili pepper or harissa

Merguez (/mɛərˈɡɛz/ mair-GHEZ) is a red, spicy lamb- or beef-based fresh sausage in Maghrebi cuisine. In France, merguez became popular in the 1960s and 1970s, as Algerian immigrants and the pieds-noirs of Algeria settled in the country and opened small shops and restaurants that served traditional dishes like merguez. The popularity of merguez in France was also fueled by the rise of fast food chains like Quick and McDonald's, which began to offer merguez sandwiches and burgers to cater to their North African clientele.

Merguez is a sausage made with uncooked lamb, beef, or a mixture stuffed into a lamb-intestine casing. It is heavily spiced with cumin and chili pepper or harissa, which give it its characteristic piquancy and red color, as well as other spices such as sumac, fennel and garlic.

Merguez is usually eaten grilled. While not in all traditional Maghrebi couscous, it is often used in algerian couscous known as couscous royal in France. It is also eaten in sandwiches and with french fries and dijon mustard.

== Etymology ==
There are several spellings in Arabic (مِركس mirkas, pl. مراكس marākis; مِركاس mirkās, مَركس markas and مِرقاز mirqāz). The hesitation between k and q probably reflects the pronunciation /ɡ/, for which there is no standard Arabic spelling; further confusing matters is that in some maghrebi dialects, Arabic qāf is sometimes pronounced as /ɡ/, as an allophone of /q/. It is first attested in the 12th century, as mirkās or merkās.

The Arabic term for the food is also the origin of the Spanish names of the foodstuffs morcon and morcilla.

== See also ==
- List of African dishes
- Berber cuisine
- Maghrebi cuisine
