= Zaalouk =

Moroccan dish

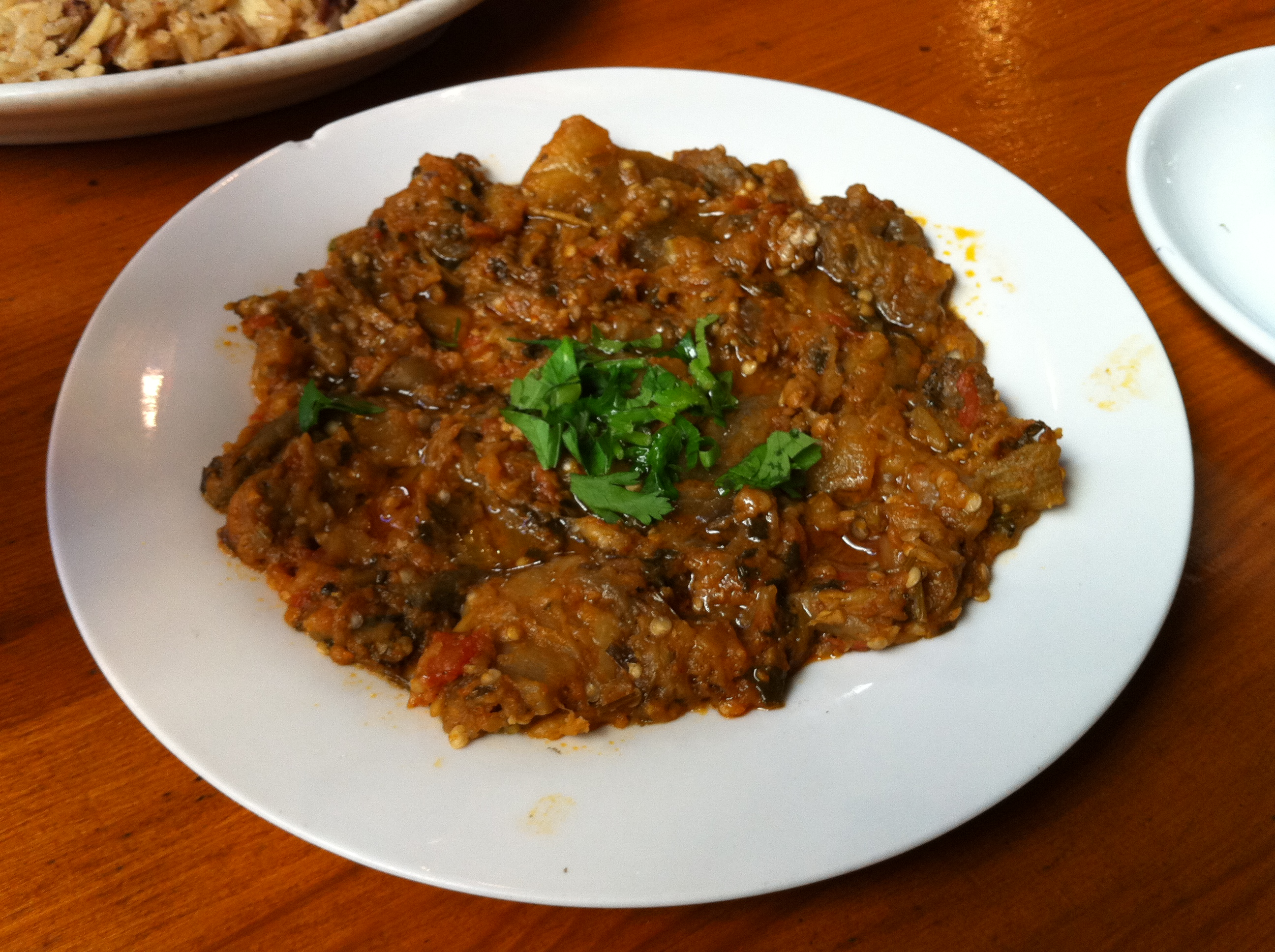
Zaalook

Zaalouk or zalouk (Berber: ⵣⴰⵄⵍⵓⴽ Moroccan Arabic: زعلوك, romanized: zaʿlūk) is a Moroccan salad of cooked eggplants and tomatoes. After being grilled, the eggplant is combined with the tomatoes and seasoned with spices and garlic.

Renowned American food writer Paula Wolfert, winner of multiple cookbook awards, described it as "one of the best of all cooked Moroccan salads".

== See also ==
- Baba ghanoush
- Taktouka
