= Berber cuisine =

Traditional North African cuisine linked to Amazigh culture

The Berber cuisine or Amazigh cuisine (Standard Moroccan Tamazight: ⴰⵏⵡⴰⵍ ⴰⵎⴰⵣⵉⵖ; Arabic: المطبخ الأمازيغي), though lacking a singular and standardized culinary framework, encompasses a diverse range of traditional dishes and influenced by the numerous flavours from distinct regions across North Africa. There is no consistent Berber cuisine, and it has been exposed to various influences. The Imazighen's meal choices were shaped by local availability of foods and personal finances. The Imazighen follow the same dietary laws and hygiene requirements as other Muslims. Ken Albala noted that "Describing meals as typically Berber (Amazigh) is impossible–at best, they are samples of what is eaten in different regions by Berber (Amazigh) families".

Amazigh cuisine differs from one area to another within North Africa and West Africa (Mauritania). For this reason, every dish has a distinct identity and taste according to its specific region of origin in North Africa, with some dishes estimated to be more than a thousand years old. Zayanes of the region of Khénifra around the Middle Atlas have a simple cuisine. It is based primarily on corn, barley, ewe's milk, goat cheese, butter, honey, meat, and game.

== See also ==
- Algerian cuisine
- Moroccan cuisine
- Tunisian cuisine
- Libyan cuisine
- Mauritanian cuisine
- Berber culture
