= Baharat =

Spice mix

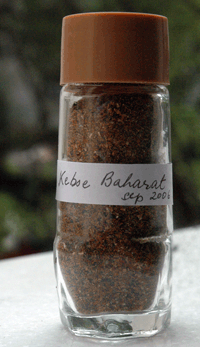
A small jar of homemade Gulf-style baharat

Bahārāt (Arabic: بَهَارَات 'spices') is a spice mixture or blend used in Middle Eastern cuisines. The mixture of finely ground spices is often used to season lamb and mutton, fish, chicken, beef, and soups, and may also be used as a condiment.

== History ==
According to historian Nawal Nasrallah, medieval Arabic cookbooks, such as the 10th century book Kitāb al-Ṭabīkh by Ibn Sayyar al-Warraq and the 13th century Aleppan Al-Wusla ila ‘l-Habeeb provide recipes for several spice blends, which were referred to with names like atraf al-teeb (أطراف الطيب), the name baharat did not come to refer to spice mixes until the Ottoman Empire. One recipe provided by Al-Wusla ila ‘l-Habeeb contained nutmeg, cloves, rose buds, green cardamom, among others.

Allspice became a prominent component of baharat when it arrived to the region from Central America in the 16th century.

== Etymology ==
Bahārāt is the Arabic word for "spices" (the plural form of bahār, 'spice'). The word originates from the Persian word bahār. The use of the term baharat likely started in the Ottoman Empire.

Some historians think that a possible etymological origin for the word baharat is the word bahar, one of the old names of India, which was the source for many of the spices imported into the Arab world.

In Arabic, baharat typically refers to spices in general rather than a specific set.

== Ingredients ==
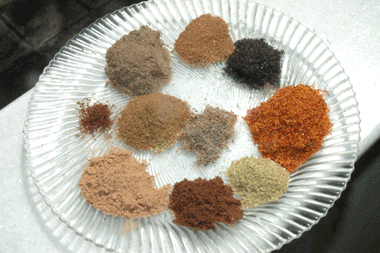
Ingredients for a Gulf-style baharat

Composition depends on the region the spice mix is from. Typical ingredients of baharat may include:

- Allspice
- Black peppercorns
- Cardamom seeds
- Cassia bark
- Cloves
- Coriander seeds
- Cumin seeds
- Ginger
- Nutmeg
- Turmeric
- Saffron
- Dried red chili peppers or paprika

The main ingredients are often cloves, black pepper, allspice, and cinnamon.

One example of a recipe for baharat is a mixture of the following finely ground ingredients:

- 6 parts paprika
- 4 parts black pepper
- 4 parts cumin seeds
- 3 parts cinnamon
- 3 parts cloves
- 3 parts coriander seeds
- 3 parts nutmeg
- 1 part cardamom pods

The mixture can be rubbed into meat or mixed with olive oil and lime juice to form a marinade.

== Variants ==
Turkish baharat typically includes cinnamon, dried rose buds, and black pepper. Turkish baharat karisimi typically includes mint.

In Tunisia, baharat refers to a simple mixture of dried rosebuds and ground cinnamon, often combined with black pepper. In Eastern Arabia, loomi (dried black lime) and saffron may also be used for the kebsa spice mixture (also called "baharat"). In the Gaza Strip, dill and hot pepper are uniquely popular components of baharat. In Egypt, baharat is typically made from cinnamon, allspice, and cloves.

Besides regional variants, the ingredients are also tailored for different dishes. Baharat mixes for sweets often use cinnamon, anise, mahlab, cardamom, saffron, or mastic.

Hwajeh (Arabic: حواجة) is a Jordanian spice and wild herb blend used in making foods like samneh and mansaf.

=== Bzar ===
Bzar or bizar (Arabic: بزار) refers to a spice mix popular in Emirati cuisine and Omani cuisine, it is made by grinding dry spices and mixing them, and often mixed with ghee and used in a wide array of dishes.

=== Seven Spices ===
In the Levant a spice mix called sabaa baharat (Arabic: سبع بهارات, lit. 'seven spices', also known as "Lebanese seven-spice", or "Arabic seven-spice"), it typically includes: cinnamon, black pepper, white pepper, allspice, cloves, nutmeg, and coriander. Common variations may include paprika, and cassia, among others.

== See also ==
- Advieh
- Arab cuisine
- Cuisine of Syria
- Garam masala
- Ras el hanout
- Za'atar
