= Emirati cuisine =

Culinary traditions of the United Arab Emirates

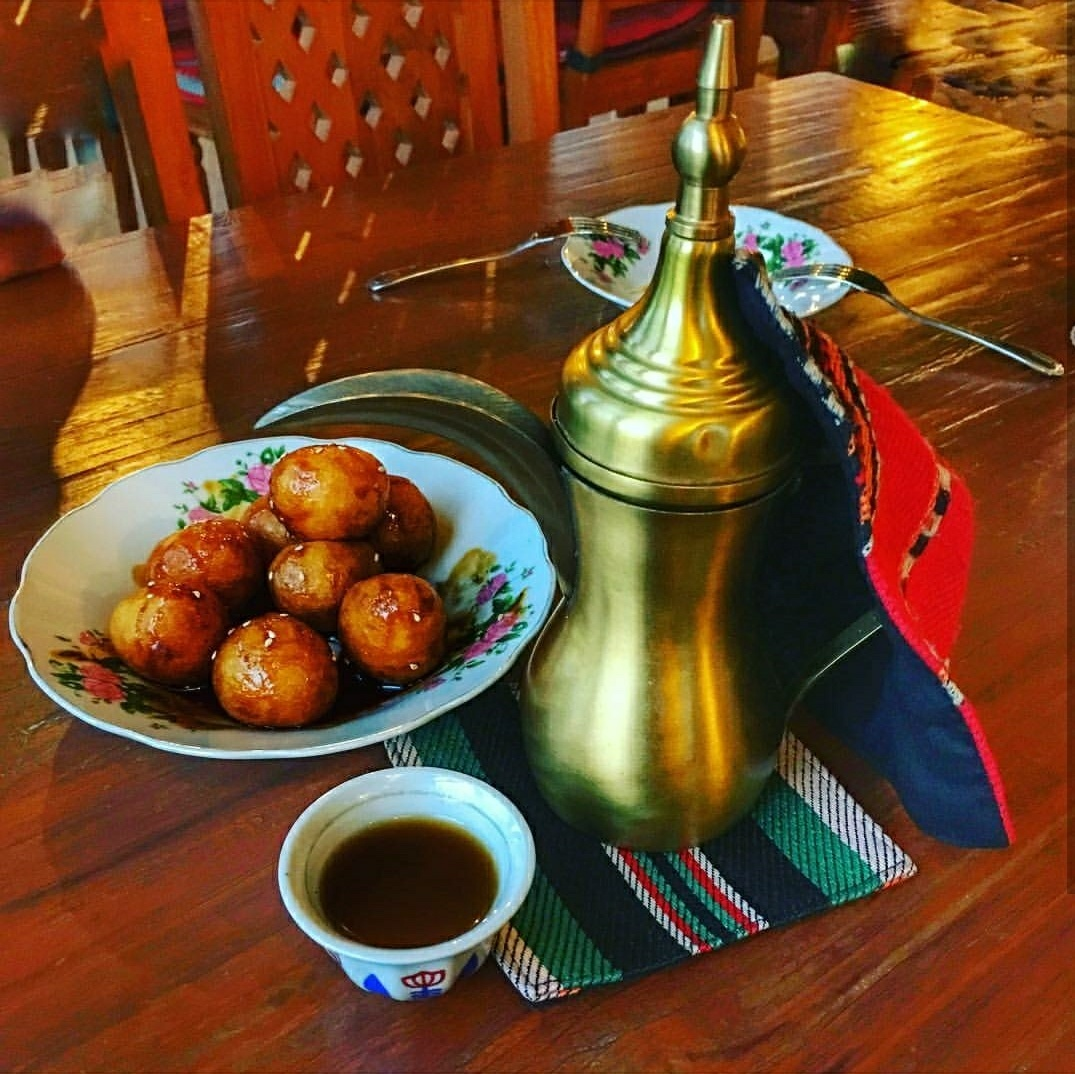
Luqaimāt (pronounced (lu)gēmāt in the Emirati dialect), a traditional Emirati dessert, served with Arabic coffee.

Emirati cuisine is the local traditional Arabic cuisine of the United Arab Emirates. The origins of Emirati cuisine come from the Bedouins who roamed the country. It is part of Eastern Arabian cuisine and shares similarities with cuisines from neighbouring countries, such as Omani cuisine and Saudi Arabian cuisine, as well as influences from different Middle Eastern and Asian cuisines. As a major international hub, the United Arab Emirates today has a multicultural variety of cuisines from different parts of the world.

== History ==
=== Origins ===
Cultivation of date palms in the area can be traced back to the mid-third millennium BC (commonly referred to as the Umm al-Nar period in the United Arab Emirates) from which many date seeds have been found in Umm al-Nar sites. The presence of grinding stones and fired clay ovens in archaeological sites indicate that grain processing was also performed. Studies of human dental remains dating back to the third millennium show a high level of attrition which is believed to result from the mastication of dry bread.

=== Modern history ===
The cuisine which originated in the area that is now the United Arab Emirates and was previously the Trucial States is formed by a similar Arabic and Middle Eastern cuisine which is consumed in the wider Arabian Peninsula. The food is a mixture of a Bedouin diet, consisting of meat and camel milk, a fisherman's diet, consisting mainly of fish common in the Persian Gulf, and a farmer's diet, consisting mainly of dates. A blend of these diets as well as a mixture of spices such as cinnamon, saffron, and turmeric formed the basis of the common dishes consumed in the Trucial states region and the current traditional Emirati cuisine.

The traditional cuisine of the United Arab Emirates uses meats from animals found in the Arabian Peninsula and fishes in the Persian Gulf. Vegetables that are easy to grow in hot dry climates, such as cucumbers and tomatoes, are often found within Emirati dishes. Common meats include chicken, lambs and goats. As camels are highly prized for their milk and transporting ability, the eating of camel meat is normally reserved for special occasions.

The dishes are usually like stews, as everything is often cooked in a single pot. Saffron, cardamom, turmeric, and thyme are the core flavors used in Emirati cookery. Rice was added to the diet when traders moved to the region. Leaves from indigenous trees, such as the ghaff, were also used to stuff small birds for enhanced flavor.

Dishes that are often eaten in the UAE include maqlūba, harīs, mačbūs, frsee'ah, fireed, jisheid, and mašwi. Breakfast in the UAE usually features breads like ragāg, khameer, and chebab, served with cheese, date syrup, or eggs. These were made over a curved hot plate, resembling a stone, which would have been used by the Bedouins. Balaleat is another dish, but its advent began with the traders, who introduced pasta.

Sweet options include luqaimat, a deep-fried ball of pancake batter that is rolled in sesame seeds and then drizzled with date honey or normal honey. Other desserts include khabeesa, bread crumbs blended with sugar, cardamom, and saffron, or bethitha, semolina blended with crushed dates, cardamom, and clarified butter.

At the close of the meal, it is usual to serve a red tea infused with mint as a digestive. Other mealtime traditions include a welcome with dates and gahwah (Arabic coffee), which are offered on arrival and are kept available throughout the guest's visit.

A confection originally from the United Arab Emirates is Dubai chocolate, a chocolate bar filled with pistachios, tahini, and the traditional Arab dessert kanafeh, which became popular after 2024 as a luxury product in the rest of the world.

== Foods and dishes ==
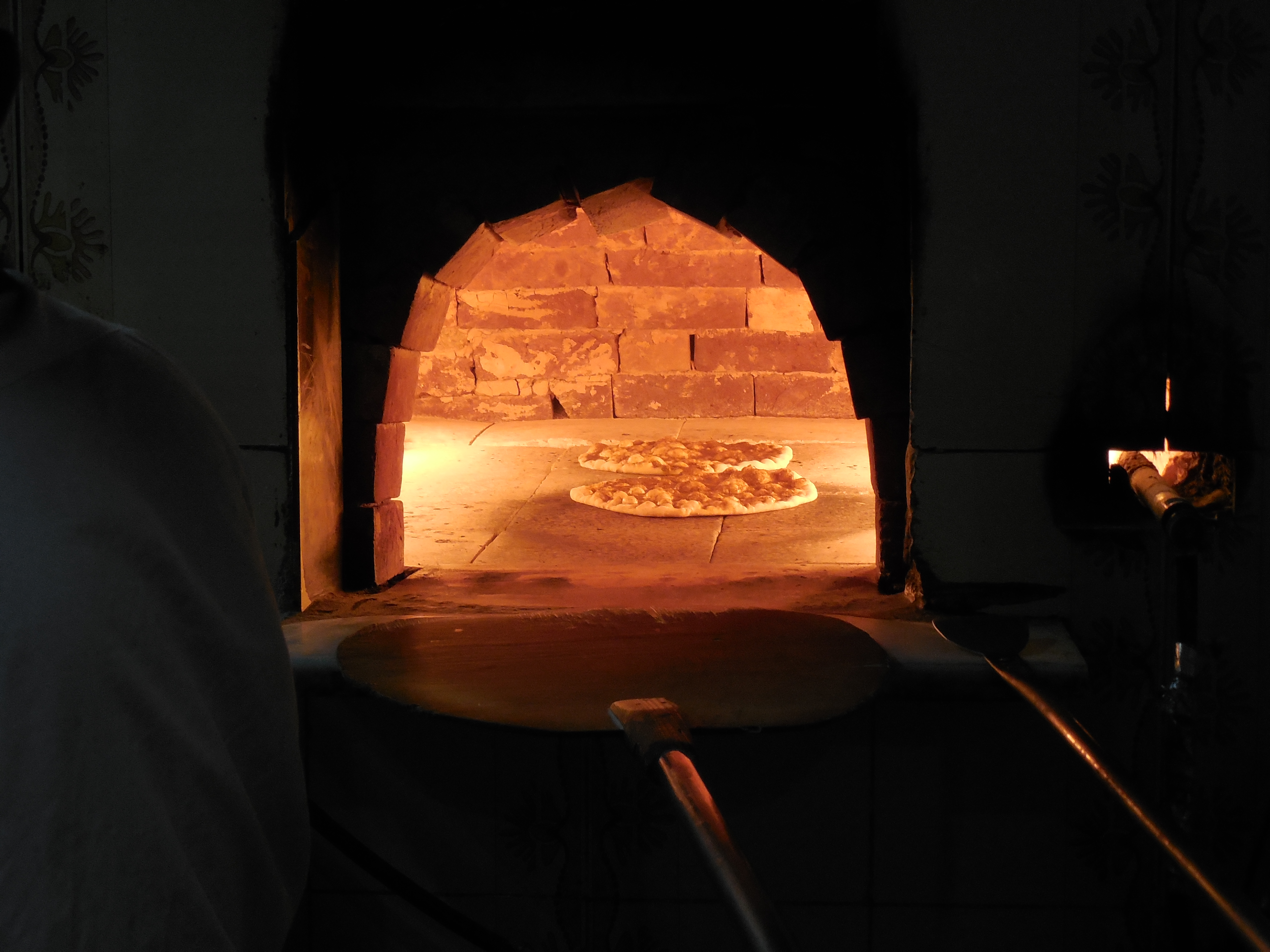
Kuboos (flatbread) being prepared in Abu Dhabi

Emirati cuisine mainly focuses on aroma produced by spices that include cardamom, dried lime, turmeric and saffron.

Seafood has been the mainstay of the Emirati diet for centuries. As the consumption of pork is forbidden under Muslim law, it is not included in most menus. Hotels frequently have pork substitutes such as beef, chicken, sausage, and veal rashers on their breakfast menus. If pork is available, it is clearly labelled as such.

Meat, fish, and rice are the staple foods of Emirati cuisine. Lamb and mutton are the more favored meats rather than goat, beef, and camel meat. Dates are usually consumed with meals.

Popular beverages are coffee and tea, which can be supplemented with cardamom, saffron, or mint to give it a distinct flavor. Alcohol is generally only served in hotel restaurants and bars (but not in Sharjah). All nightclubs and golf clubs are permitted to sell alcohol. Specific supermarkets may sell pork in a separate section of the market.

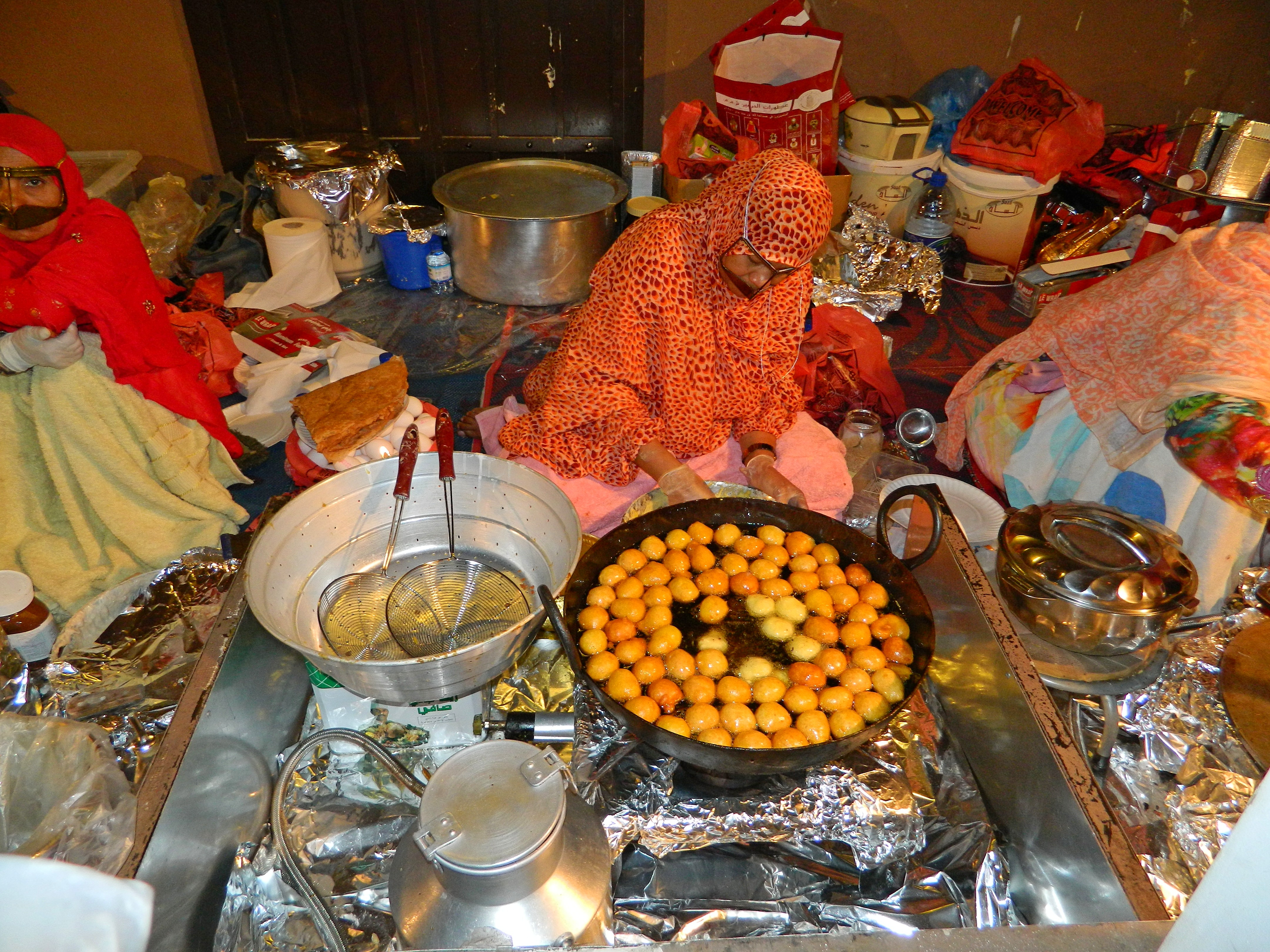
An old Emirati woman making Luqaymāt

=== Foods ===
Dishes forming part of the Emirati cuisine include:

- Asida
- Chebab bread
- Balaleet
- Bajella
- Bathieth
- Biryani
- Dango
- Harees
- Jami
- Jesheed
- Kabsa
- Khabees
- Khanfroush
- Khamir bread
- Lugaimat
- Machboos
- Madroob
- Mandi
- Margouga
- Maqluba
- Muhala bread
- Salona
- Shawarma
- Shuwaa
- Tharid
- Waggafi bread

=== Beverages ===
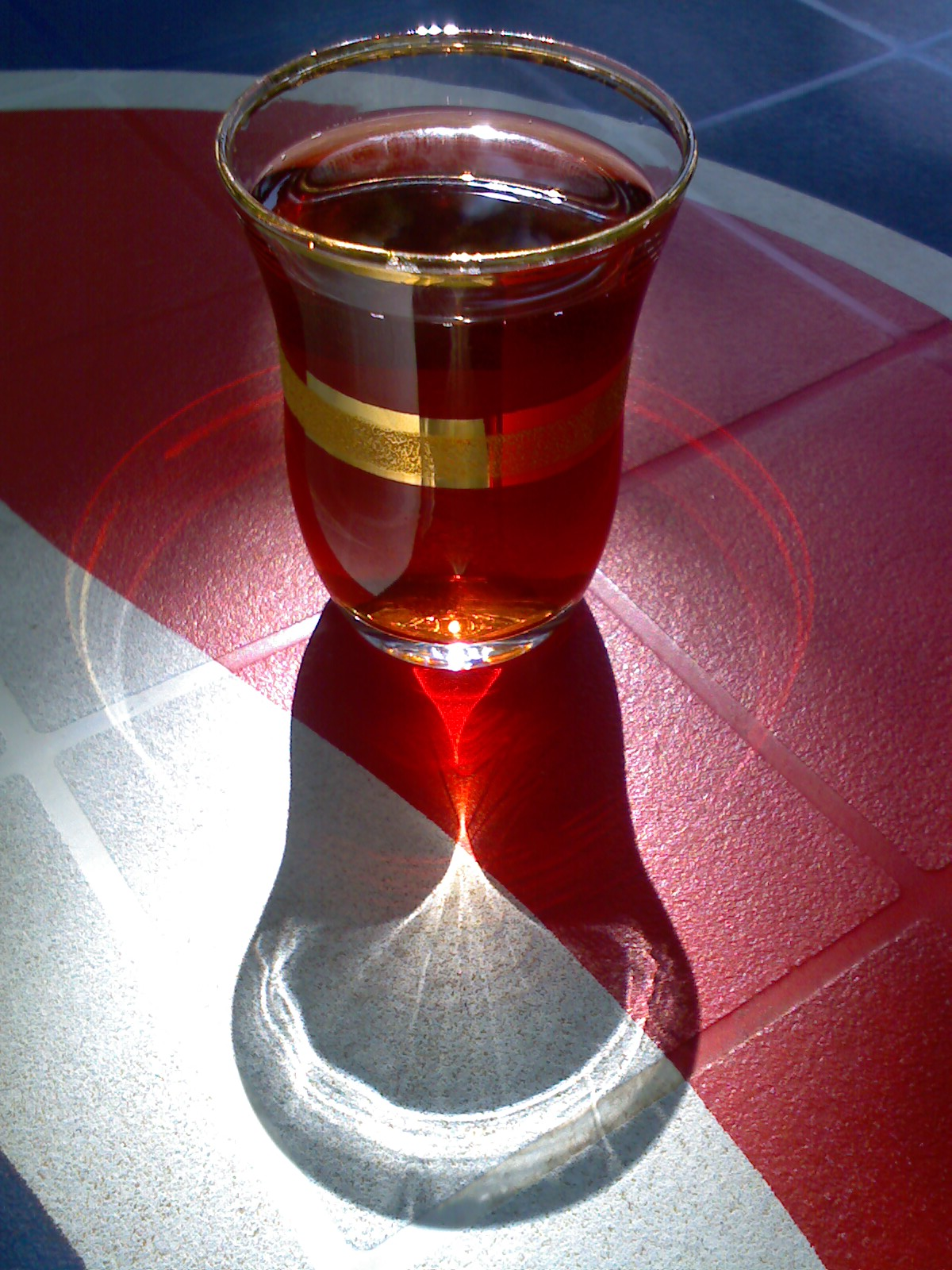
Traditional Arabic tea in the UAE

- Camel milk
- Soft drinks
- Tea
- Masala chai
- Water
- Juice
- Laban
- Arabic coffee
- Arabic tea

== Events ==
=== Dubai Food Festival ===
The inaugural Dubai Food Festival was held from 21 February to 15 March 2014. According to Vision the event was aimed at enhancing and celebrating Dubai's position as the gastronomic capital of the region. The festival was designed to showcase the variety of flavours and cuisines on offer in Dubai featuring the cuisines of over 200 nationalities at the festival.
