= Mirra =

Mirra may refer to:

- Mırra, traditional type of bitter coffee in Turkey and some Arabic countries
- Mirra chair, chair designed by Herman Miller
- Mirra (opera) by Alaleona

== People ==
- Anthony Mirra (1927–1982), American mobster, soldier and later caporegime for the Bonanno crime family
- Dave Mirra (1974–2016), American BMX rider who later competed in rallycross racing
- David Mirra (born 1991), former Australian rules footballer
- Helen Mirra (born 1970), American conceptual artist
- Lenny Mirra (born 1964), former American state legislator
- Marianela Mirra (born 1984), Argentine reality TV participant and TV personality
- Mirra Alfassa (1878–1973), spiritual guru, an occultist and a collaborator of Sri Aurobindo
- Mirra Andreeva (born 2007), Russian tennis player
- Mirra Bank, director of film, television, and theater
- Mirra Ginsburg (1909 - 2000), 20th-century Jewish Russian translator and children's writer

== See also ==
- Myrrha
