= Eastern Arabian cuisine =

Traditional Arabic cuisine

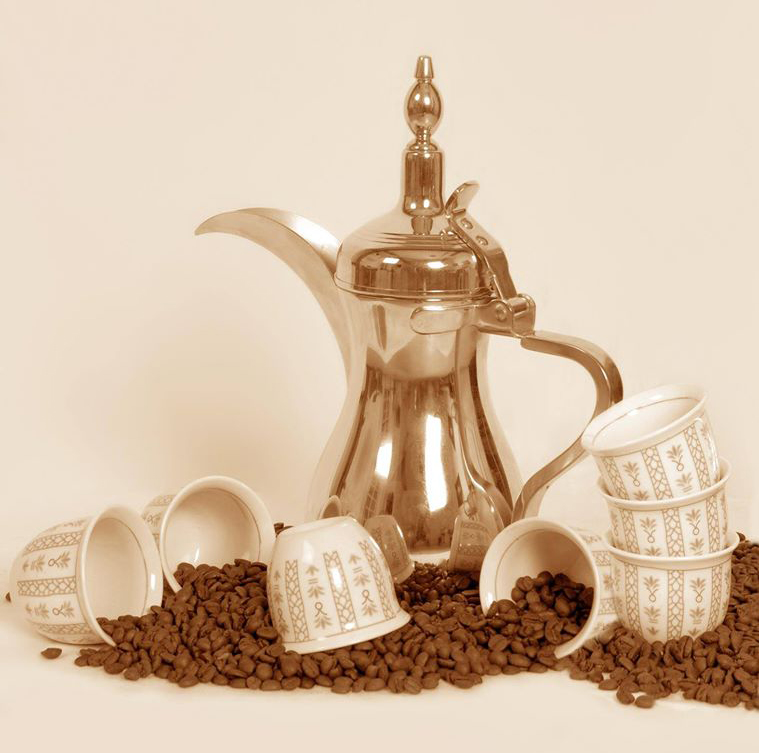
A dallah is a traditional Arabic coffee pot that contains Arabic coffee, which is usually served to guests in the majlis or dewaniya.

Eastern Arabian cuisine, also called Khaleeji cuisine (Arabic: المطبخ الخليجي), is the traditional Arabic cuisine variant that is shared by the population in Eastern Arabia and areas around the Persian Gulf. Seafood is a significant part of the diet of the inhabitants of the coastal region of Eastern Arabia. Fish is popular. The cuisine of eastern Arabia is different from the cuisine of the Arabs of Hejaz, Yemen, Najd, Oman, and other parts of Arabia. Harees is also a popular dish in the region.

Eastern Arabian cuisine today forms the traditional cuisine for countries such as Kuwait, Bahrain, Qatar, United Arab Emirates, the southern part of Iraq, and eastern parts of Saudi Arabia and Oman, each with slight local variations.

== History ==
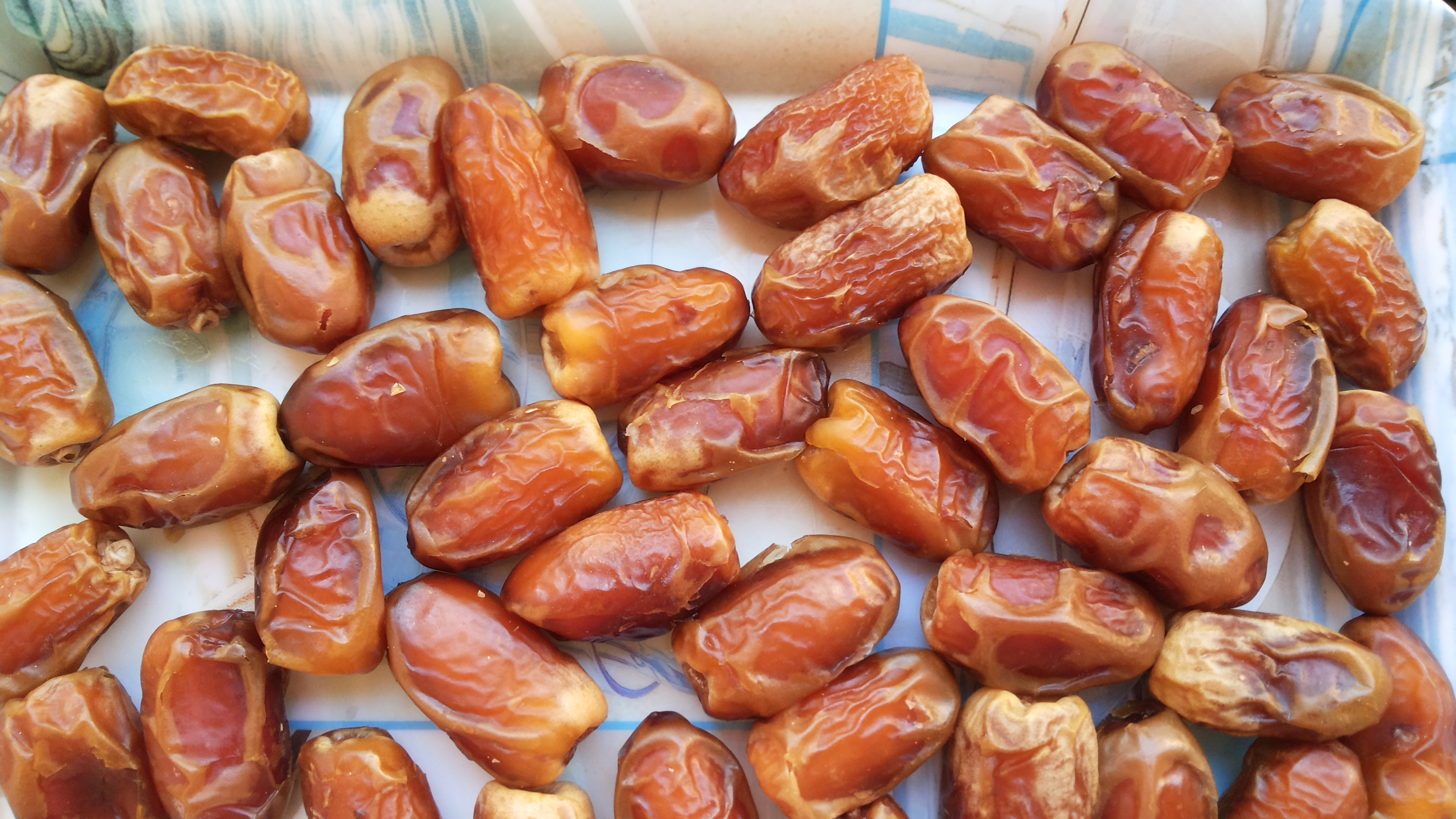
Sag'ai dates from Saudi Arabia. Sag'ai dates are grown in the Arabian Peninsula and are naturally sweet, luscious and very soft.

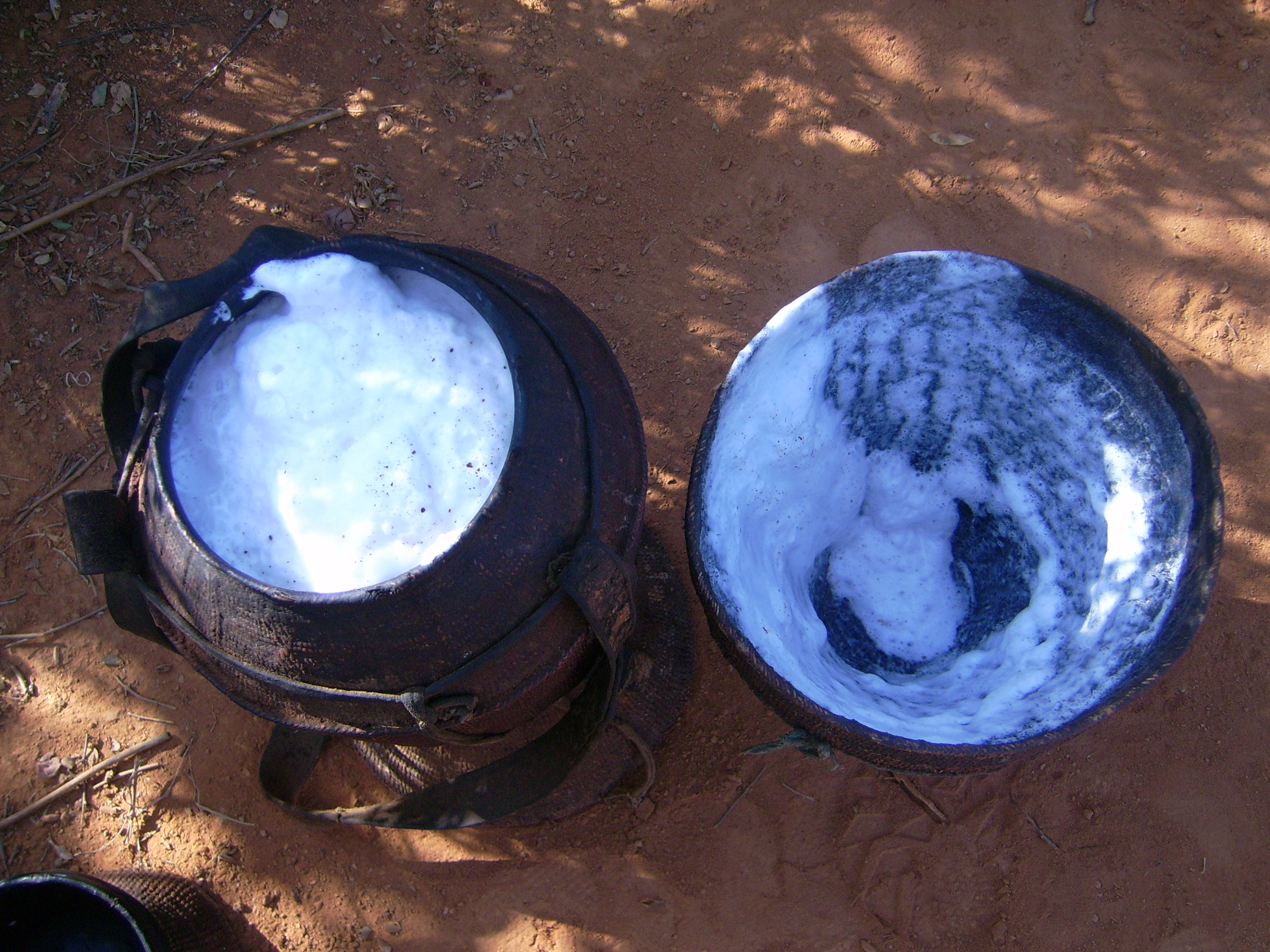
Fresh Arabian camel milk. Camel milk may also be strained to form strained yogurt.

Originally, the inhabitants of Eastern Arabia relied heavily on a diet of dates, wheat, barley, rice and meat, with little variety, and with a heavy emphasis on yogurt products, such as "leben" (لبن) (yogurt without butterfat). Globalization and contact with ancient civilizations such as the Romans, Persians, and later on with the Ottomans brought the Arabs in close contact with dishes of several other cultures, as well as introducing several new ingredients in their diet.

As with most Asian cultures, much of the modern culinary heritage can find its root in either Persian, Indian, or Chinese cuisines. In fact the food structure of Persian-Arabian civilization began with cooking techniques innovated in ancient Persia and carried forward by Persians during the Sassanid Dynasty. With subsequent development and growth of the Ottomans (Turkish empire), Arab culture came in contact with the Ottoman empire; Turkish contributions to the Arabian culture included "kebabs".

This multicultural inclusion became possible after the advent of Islam, and with the growth of Arabian influence after the invasion of Persia, Balkans, and North Africa, making it possible for merchants of different nations to travel long distances coming into contact and being influenced by or influencing local cuisines they encountered. The exchange of customs and food was bidirectional, with Arabs also exporting their dietary preferences such as dates, figs, and lamb to the areas they traveled to or conquered including the Persian empire and the Turkish population of Balkan. This interchange of goods and ways of life, was significant in forming the current modern Arab diet. Arabs later on transferred these newly gained cuisines on their conquests to Africa, and as far as North Africa, West Africa, and South of Spain. In fact, certain Spanish desserts such as polvorones, tocino de cielo (custard and caramel) and yemas de San Leandro (marzipan based) are heavily influenced by the Moors. Though these influences were not carried out by the original Arabs of the Arabian sub-continent, their westward expansion into Egypt, and Morocco led to dissemination of Chinese, Indian, Arabian, and Persian cuisines and eventually their vicarious adoption by the North Africans.

== Ingredients ==
Eastern Arabian cuisine today is the result of combination of diverse cuisines, incorporating Persian, Indian, Lebanese and Chinese cooking styles, and many items not originally indigenous to the region, which were most probably imported on the dhows and the caravans. In addition, the cuisine is heavily dosed with spices, from hot sauces to every variety of pepper, to tea. This cuisine also favors vegetables such as cucumbers, eggplants, and onions, and fruits (primarily citrus). Notably, many of the same spices used in eastern Arabia cuisine are also those emphasized in the Indian cuisine. This is a result of heavy trading between the two regions, and of the current state of affairs in the wealthy oil states, in which many South Asian workers are living abroad in Eastern Arabia.

== National cuisines ==
- Bahraini cuisine
- Emirati cuisine
- Kuwaiti cuisine
- Omani cuisine
- Qatari cuisine
- Saudi Arabian cuisine
- Yemeni cuisine

== Culture ==
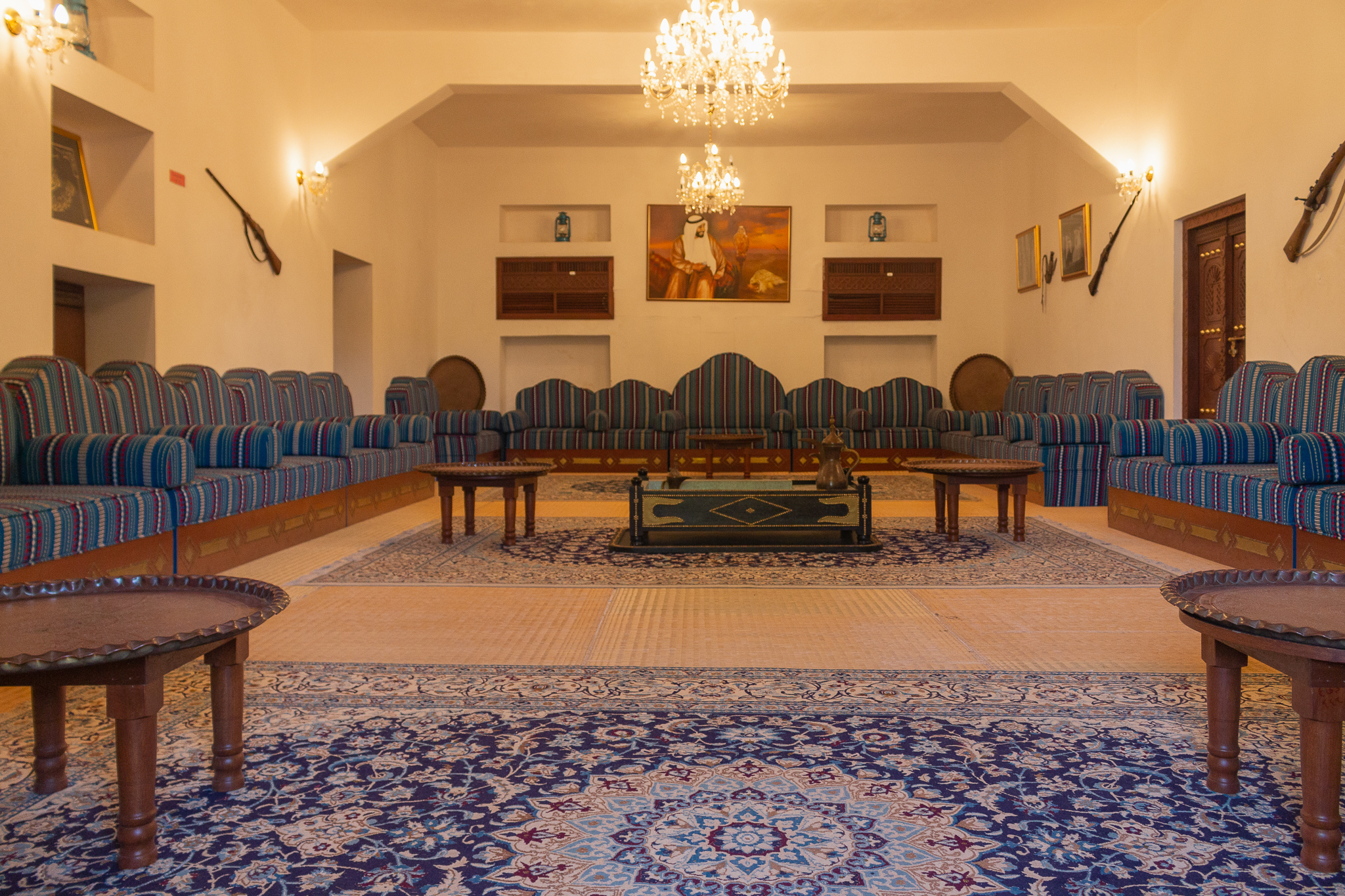
A majlis in the United Arab Emirates. Majlis (literally a place of sitting) is where guests are welcomed and usually offered dates and Arabic coffee.

Essential to any cooking in eastern Arabia is the concept of hospitality. Meals are sometimes family affairs, with shared conversation over the dinner table. Formal dinners and celebrations generally entail large quantities of food, and every occasion entails large quantities of Arabic coffee, known locally as qahwa, served in an ornately crafted dallah (coffee pot). The coffee is poured into a small cup called a finjaan, and symbolizes warmth and respect. It is often served alongside dates. The hosts will continually refill the guest's finjaan until the guest gently shakes the cup, signaling that they have had enough.

The majlis serves as the main space of hospitality in the Gulf States, and is reserved only for males. The Kuwaiti diwaniya serves a similar role. Women's hospitality spaces tend to be more private, but they also uphold the same cultural values of generosity and welcome.

== Influences ==
In addition to Arab cuisine, the following cuisines have influenced, or have been influenced by the Eastern Arabian cuisine, either due to trade (mostly maritime from the far east), or as a result of ancient contact:

- Indian cuisine
- African cuisine
- Balochi cuisine
- Fusion cuisine
- Iranian cuisine
