= Domenico Alaleona =

Italian organist and composer

Domenico Alaleona (16 November 1881 – 28 December 1928) was an Italian organist and composer. He was born in and died in Montegiorgio. He studied composition under Cesare De Sanctis (1824–1916) and organ with Remigio Renzi.

== Works ==
- Mirra, opera, 1920
