= Mirra (opera) =

Mirra is a 1920 opera by Domenico Alaleona based on Ovid's legend of Myrrha and her father Cinyras, told in the Metamorphoses. The libretto is based on a play by Vittorio Alfieri.

== Recordings ==
- Mirra Denia Mazzola-Gavazzeni, Hanna Schaer, Franck Ferrari (father), Julia Gertseva, Mario Malagnini, Choeur de Radio France, Maîtrise de Radio France. Orchestre National de France. cond. Juraj Valcuha, Naive 2014
