= Khabees =

Traditional Arabian cuisine

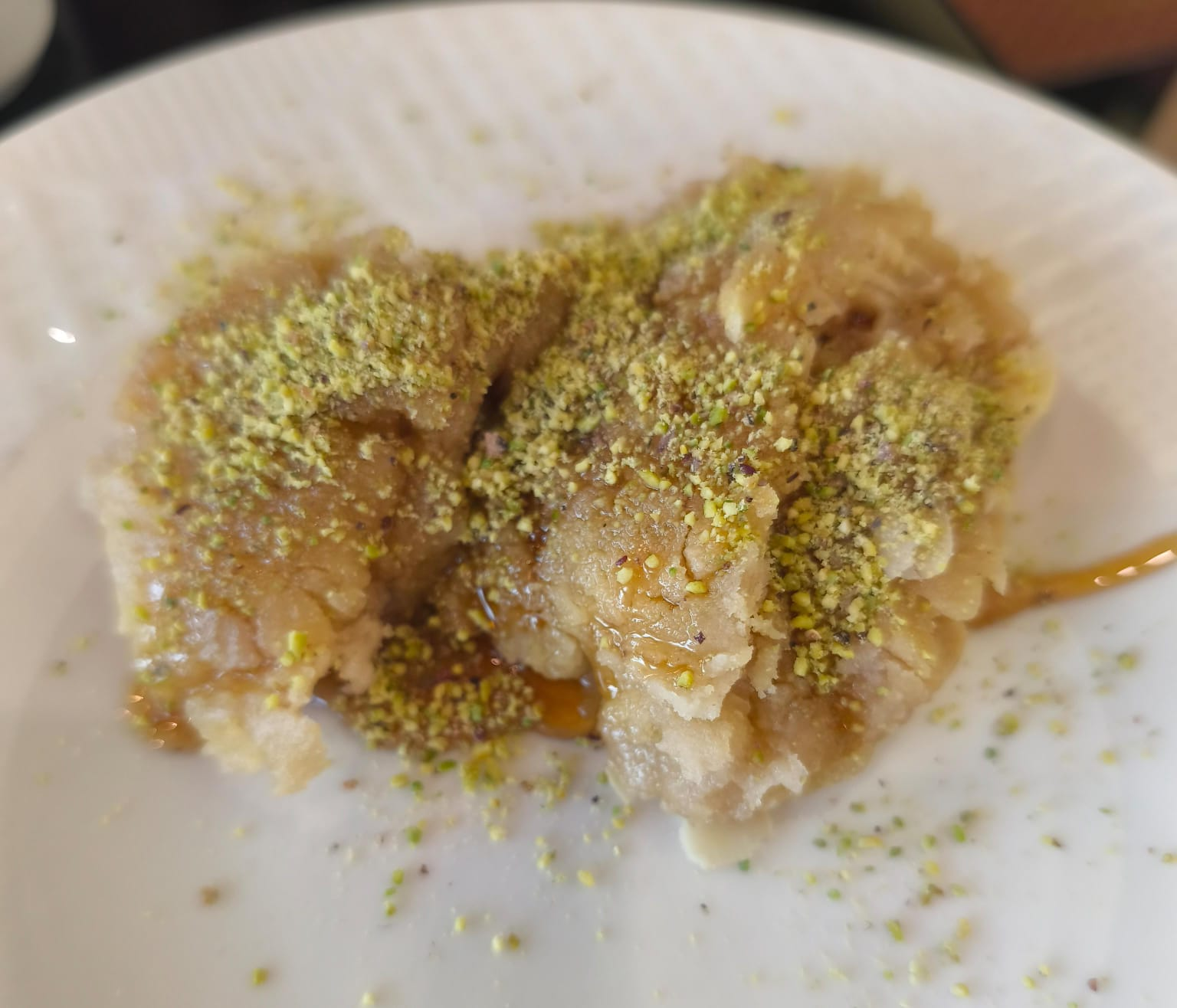
- Khabees, a traditional sweet from the Arabian Peninsula
- Type: Dessert
- Place of origin: Arabian Peninsula
- Region or state: Kuwait, Bahrain, United Arab Emirates, Qatar, Oman, and Saudi Arabia
- Serving temperature: Hot
- Main ingredients: Flour, oil, cardamom and saffron

Khabees (Arabic: الخبيص; sometimes pronounced "khabeesa") is a traditional sweet dish common in the Persian Gulf Arab States and Qatar, Bahrain, Kuwait, Oman, Saudi Arabia and the United Arab Emirates. It is made of flour and oil and is commonly served as a traditional dish for breakfast, especially during Eid days.

== Etymology ==
Khabees خَبِيصْ (or more uncommonly, khabeesa خبيصة) from the root خَبَصَ (“to mix”) is denominal.

== History ==
A recipe for khabees was mentioned in a 10th-century Arabic cookbook, Kitab al-Ṭabīḫ ('the book of dishes') by Ibn Sayyar al-Warraq.
