= Omani cuisine =

Culinary traditions of Oman

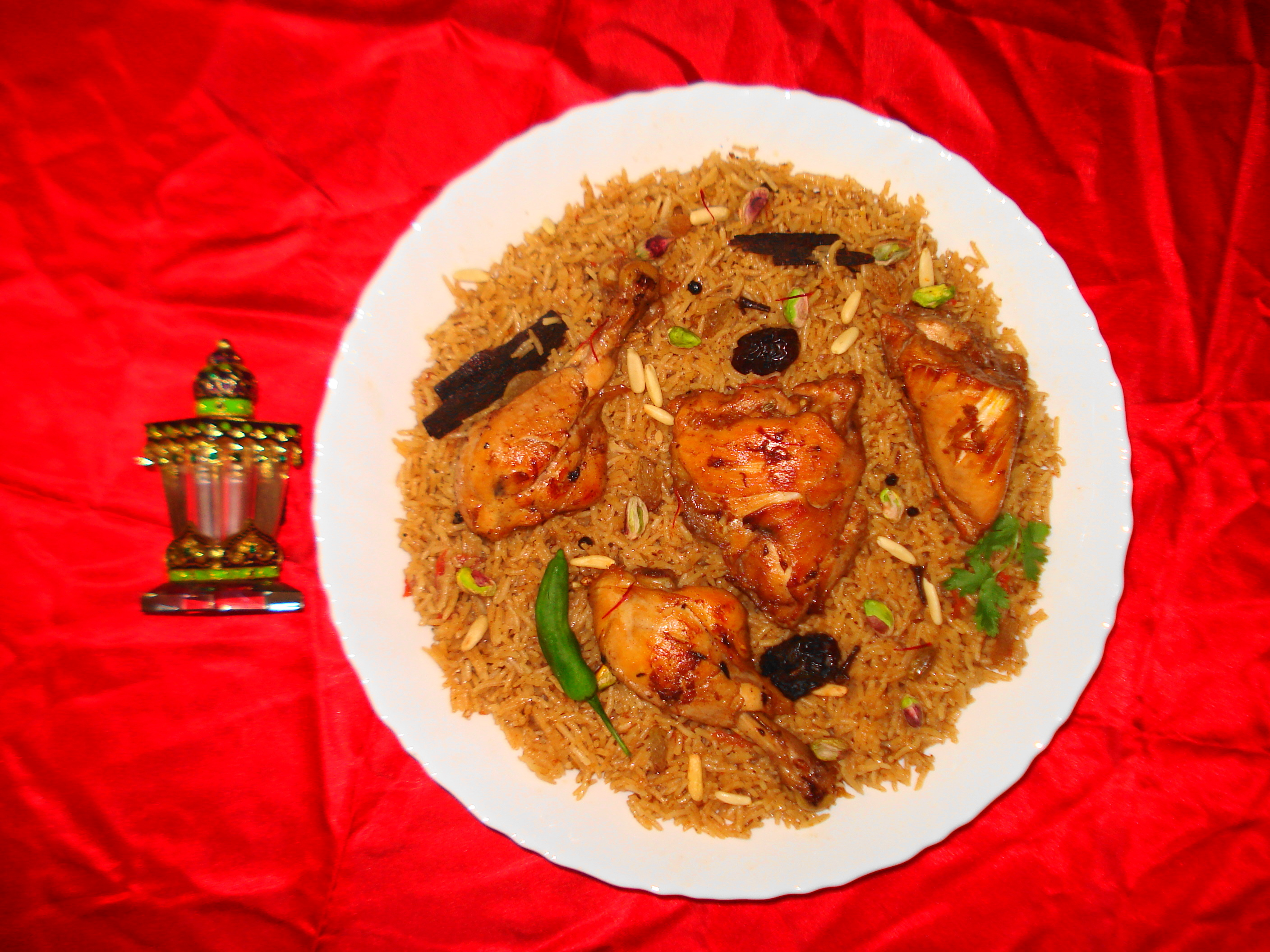
Kabsa, more commonly known as machbus in the Khaleeji cuisine

Omani cuisine is part of the Khaleeji cuisine and is influenced by Arab, Indian, Iranian, Asian, Greek, and African cuisine, reflecting Oman's position as a vast trading empire at the intersection of traditional spice trade routes. Dishes are often based on chicken, fish, and lamb, as well as the staple of rice. Most Omani dishes tend to contain a rich mixture of spices, herbs, and marinades.

Pork consumption is forbidden to Muslims in Oman, in accordance with Islamic dietary laws. However, pork products are allowed to be imported into the country and are restricted to non-Muslims.

== Characteristics ==
Although Omani cuisine varies within different regions of Oman, most dishes across the country have a staple of curry, cooked meat, rice, and vegetables. Soups are also common and are usually made from chicken, lamb, and vegetables (such as smoked eggplant). The main meal is usually eaten in the middle of the day, while dinner is lighter.

== Dishes ==
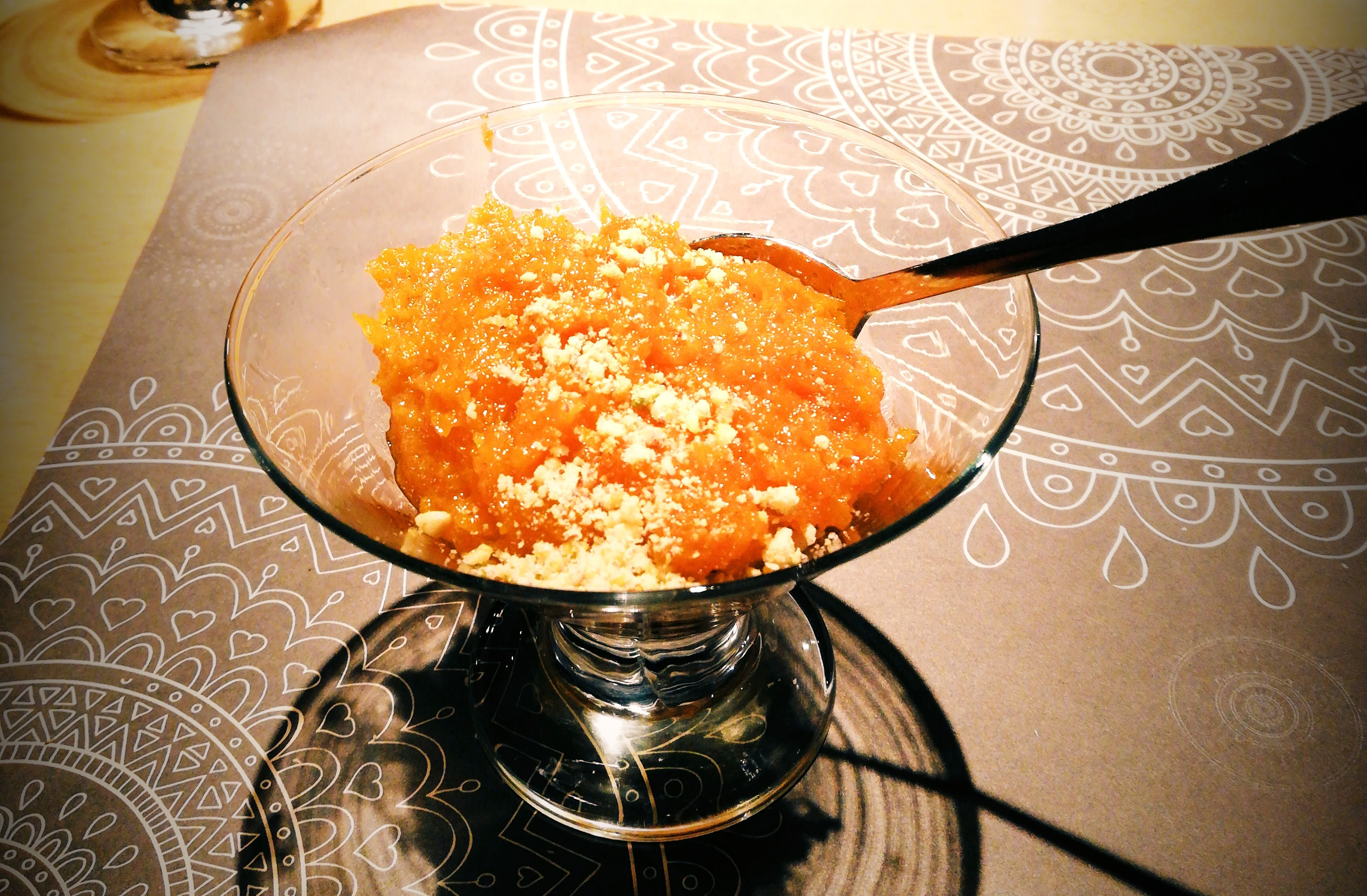
Omani halwa

- Harees is wheat mixed with meat or chicken cooked until it forms a thick paste eaten with the fingers or a spoon and served with ghee.
- Qabuli is rice mixed with camel meat or chicken cooked until the meat or chicken and rice is well done enough to be eaten and then at the end served with some ghee. Eaten by hand.
- Kahwa is an Omani coffee mixed with cardamom powder, often served as a symbol of hospitality. It is typically served with dates and Omani halwa.
- Kebab is a dish of spiced and salted skewered meat (usually chicken or beef) barbecued or grilled, served with a side of vegetables.
- Mashuai is a dish consisting of a whole spit-roasted kingfish, served with a side of lemon rice.
- Machboos is a rice dish sometimes flavored with saffron and cooked in the same water that the chicken or meat was cooked in.
- Muqalab is heart, liver, lungs, and tripe cooked with a variety of spices, including cinnamon, cardamom, cloves, black pepper, ginger, garlic, and nutmeg.
- Shuwaa is a meal eaten only on festive occasions. The dish consists of chunks of goat, sheep, cow, or camel meat marinated in a spicy date paste and roasted in a special oven, which is a pit dug in the ground. This is usually a communal activity by an entire village. The meat is flavoured with a variety of spices, then wrapped in sacks made of dry leaves, which are in turn placed into the oven.
- Sakhana is a thick soup made from wheat, dates, molasses, and milk, typically eaten during Ramadan.
- Albadhinajan mae tawarikh is a cake made from eggplant, dates, and onions.
- Mushaltat is a wheat flatbread often stuffed with cheese, meat, honey or vegetables.

== Beverages ==
Tea is the national beverage, while coffee is drunk for hospitality. Other popular beverages include laban (a type of salty buttermilk), yogurt drinks, soft drinks, and Omani kahwa (coffee).

== See also ==
- Arab cuisine
