= Mihbaj =

Bedouin grinding implement

A mihbaj (Arabic: مهباج), also known as a jurn (Arabic: الجرن), or azzam (العزام, literally: "The Inviter"), is a traditional Arabic implement, made of a wooden base with a foot-long pestle, that serves both as a coffee grinder and as percussion instrument. It is one of the few instruments used in Bedouin music.

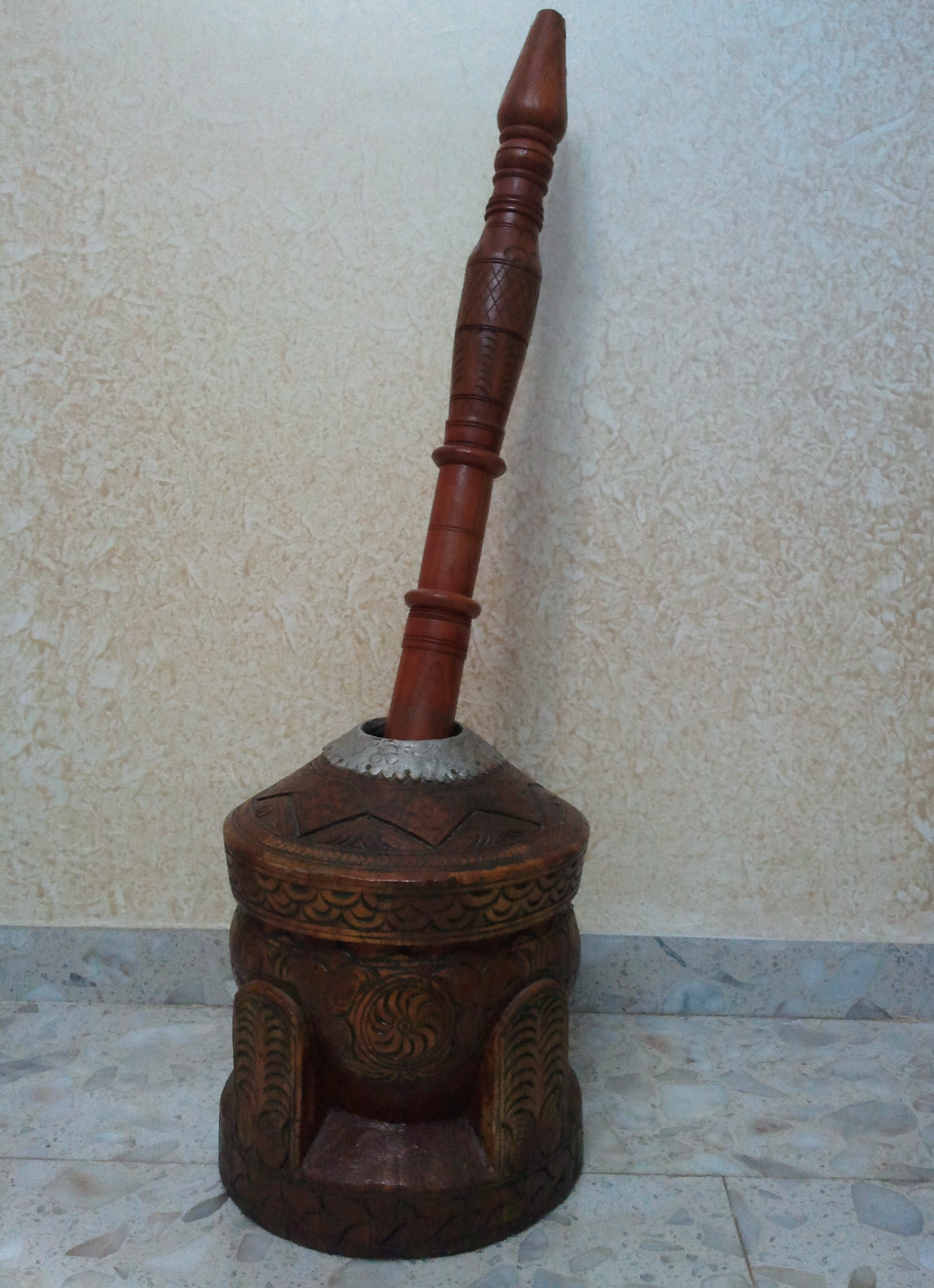
