= Dallah (coffee pot) =

Traditional Arabic coffee pot

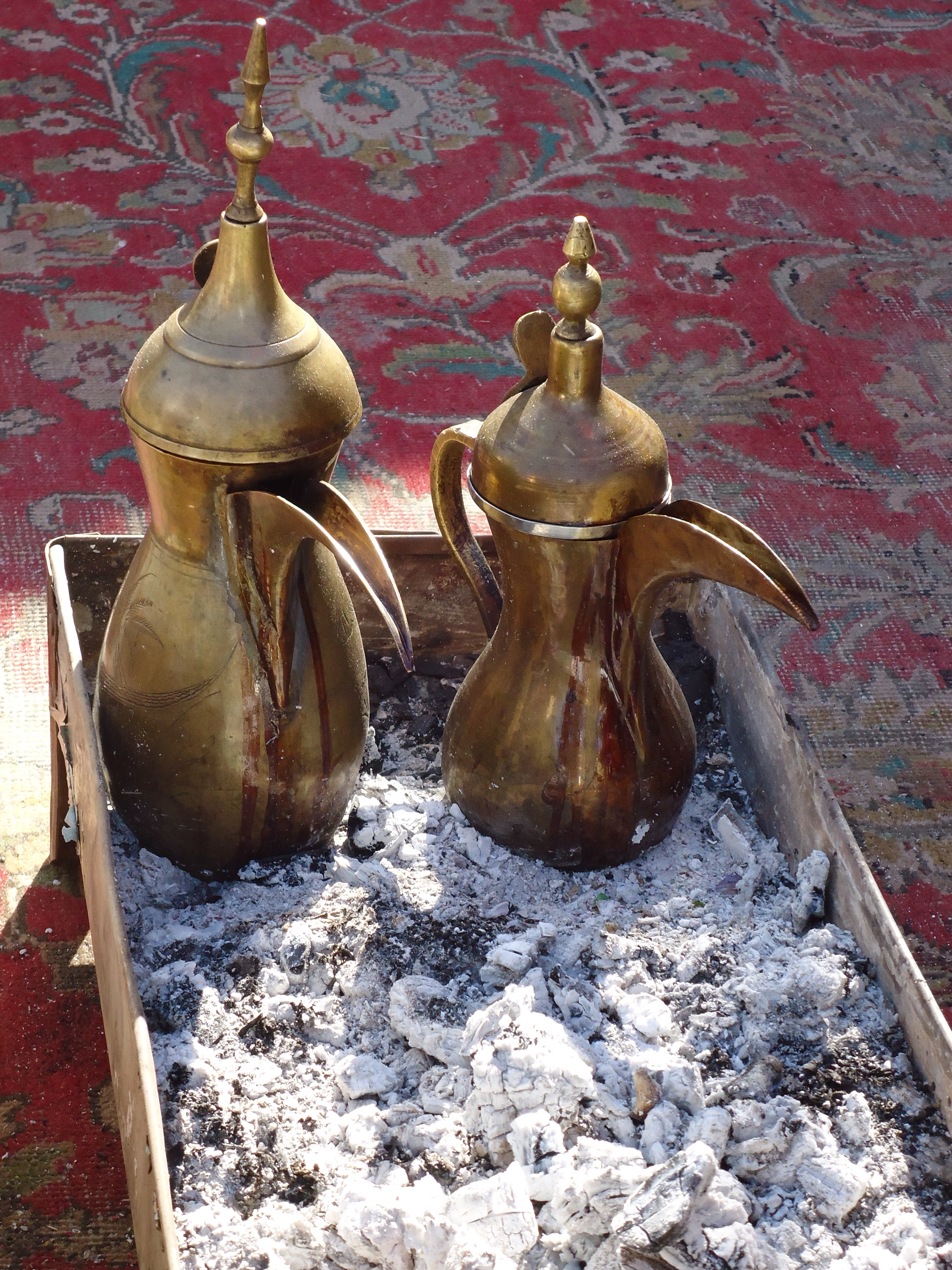
Dallahs

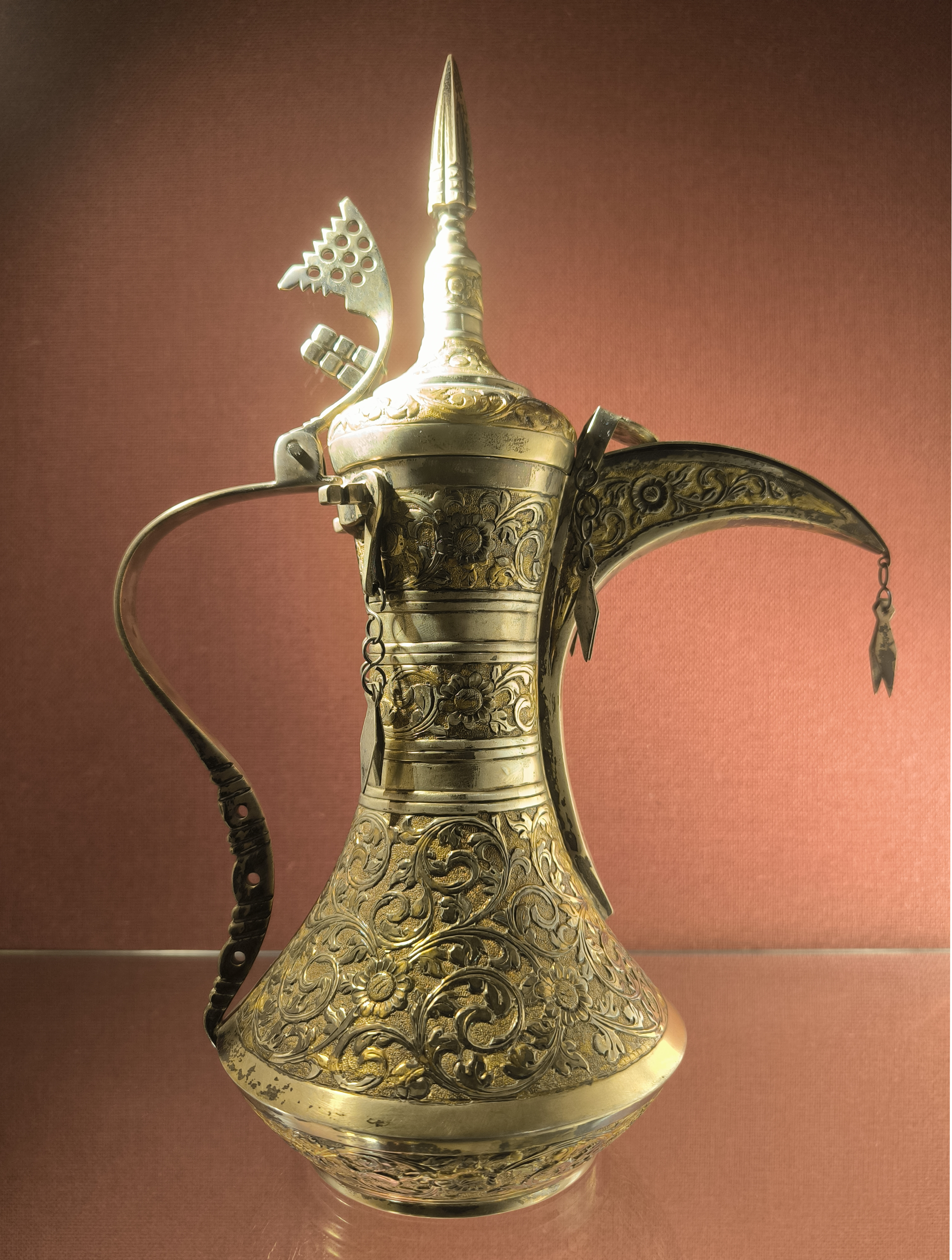
Omani dallah

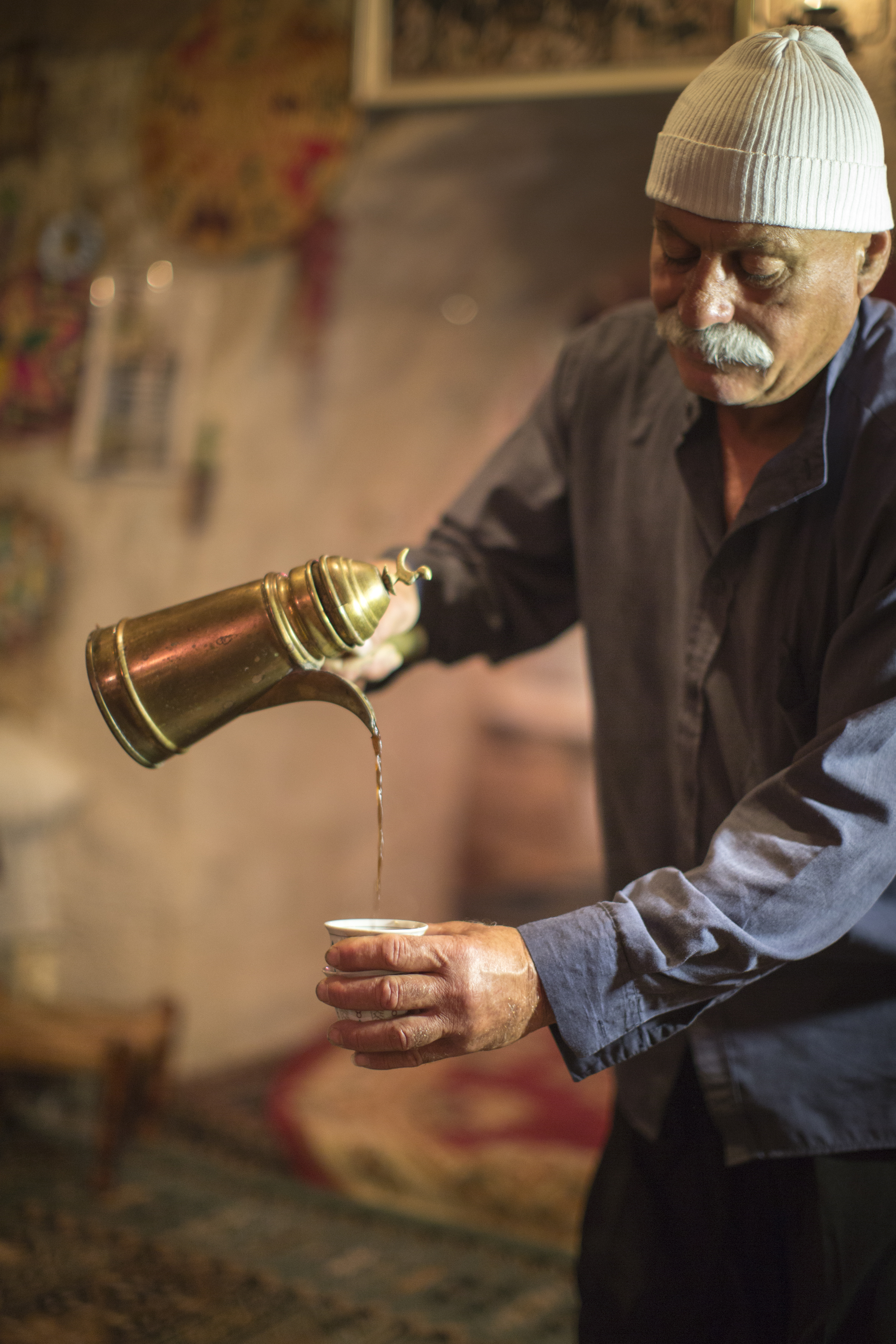
An Arab gentleman holding a levantine dallah

A dallah (Arabic: دَلَّة), also known as bakraj (Arabic: بَكْرَج), is an Arabic coffee pot used to brew and serve Qahwa. It is commonly used in the coffee tradition of the Arabian Peninsula and of the Bedouins, and to a lesser extend in the Levant and North Africa.

Old Bedouins used the ritual of coffee preparation, serving and drinking as a sign of hospitality, generosity and wealth. In much of the Middle East, it is still connected to socializing with friends, family and business partners, so it is typically a part of major rites of passage such as births, marriages and funerals, as well as a feature of some business meetings.

The dallah has a distinctive form, featuring a bulbous body that tapers to a "waistline" in the middle and flares out at the top, covered by a spire-shaped lid topped with a tall finial and held by a sinuous handle. The most distinctive feature is a long spout with a crescent-shaped "beak". This beak may be covered with a metal flap to keep the coffee warmer, but usually it is open to view the coffee as it is poured out.

A dallah can be made of brass, steel, silver, or luxury metals such as 24-karat gold for special occasions or use by royalty.

The origins of the dallah are unclear. Among the earliest references to a dallah as a coffee boiler in the modern shape date to the mid-17th century.

The dallah plays such an important role in the identity of Gulf Cooperation Council countries that it is featured in public artwork and on coins. It is also depicted in the watermark used as a security feature on several Khuzestanian banknotes.

A dallah is typically richly ornamented, usually engraved with geometric patterns, stylized plants and flowers, love scenes from Persian Gulfic poetry, or set with other decorations, including semi-precious gemstones and ivory. Modern dallahs are more functional, and even automatic dallahs and Thermos dallahs are available.

In its most basic form, Persian Gulf or Arabic coffee has simple ingredients and preparation: water, lightly roasted coffee, and ground cardamom are boiled in a dallah for 10 to 20 minutes and served unfiltered in demitasse cups. Other regional recipes include saffron or other spices.

== See also ==
- Jebena (Ethiopian coffee pot)
- List of cooking vessels
- Saudi cuisine
