= Mırra =

Type of bitter coffee from the Levant

Murra, or mirra (Arabic: مرّة, lit. 'bitter') is a traditional type of bitter Arabic coffee prepared in the Levant and parts of southern Turkey. Because of its intense bitterness, murra is traditionally served in very small amounts.

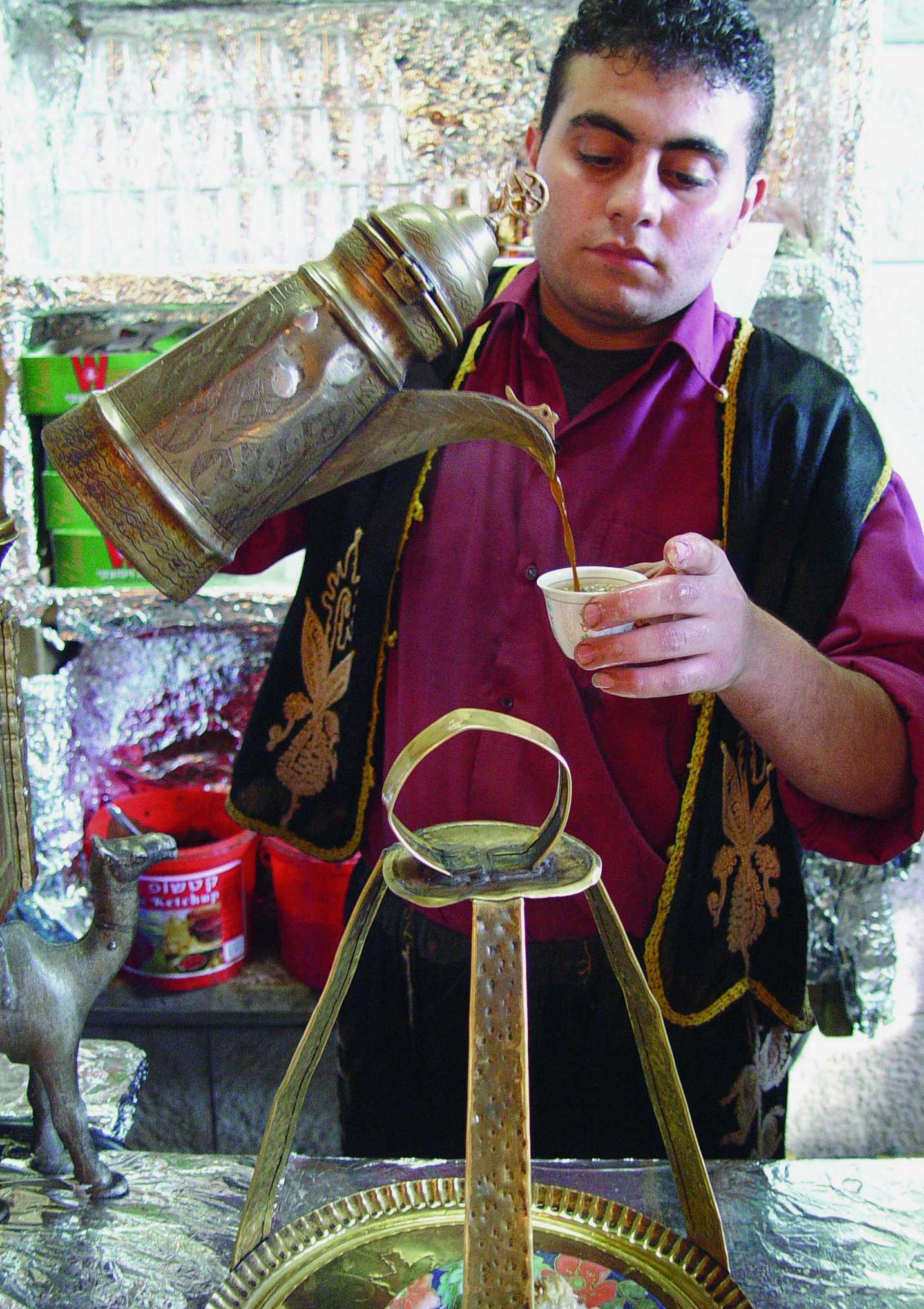
Murra coffee in Abu Ghosh

The coffee beans are roasted twice to enhance their strong, bitter flavor. Unlike Turkish coffee, which is ground into a fine powder, murra beans are coarsely ground, giving the coffee a grainier texture. The ground coffee is then boiled and simmered with cardamom seeds for several hours, until a thick, dark liquid forms.

When serving, the host fills the cup halfway and hands it to a guest. The guest drinks it and returns the cup to be refilled and passed to the next person. As the cup circulates among guests, each returns it to the server after finishing. According to tradition, failure to return the cup properly may require the guest to fill it with gold, marry the server, assist them in marrying, or contribute to their dowry (if the server is a woman).
