= Arabic coffee =

Black coffee popular in the Middle East

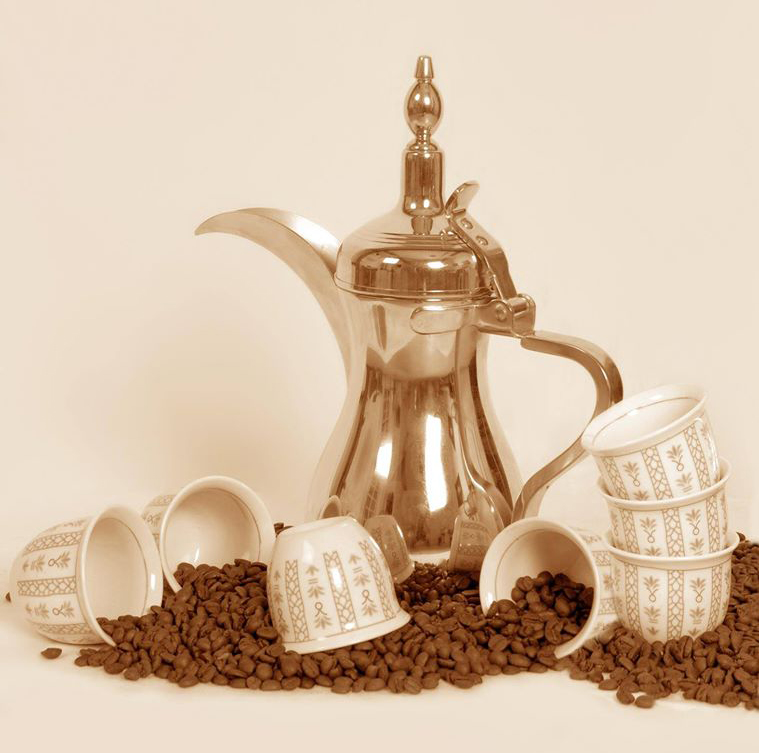
- A dallah, a traditional Arabic coffee pot, pictured with cups and unground coffee beans
- Alternative names: Qahwah arabiyya
- Type: Coffea arabica
- Course: Drink
- Place of origin: Mokha
- Region or state: Yemen
- Associated cuisine: Arab cuisine
- Invented: 15th century
- Serving temperature: Hot
- Main ingredients: ground coffee, water, and cardamom

Arabic coffee, known in Arabic as qahwa (Arabic: قهوة), is a family of brewed coffee made from Coffea arabica beans. Most Arab countries throughout the Middle East developed distinct methods for brewing and preparing coffee. Cardamom is an often-added spice, but it can also be served plain or with sugar.

Arabic coffee is bitter and usually served without sugar. It is typically brewed in a dallah or cezve, and served in a small cup decorated with a pattern, known as a finjān. Culturally, Arabic coffee is served during family gatherings or when receiving guests, with its preparation reflecting local customs.

Arabic coffee originated in Greater Yemen, beginning in the port city of Mokha in Yemen and eventually travelling to Mecca in Hejaz, Egypt, the Levant, and then, in the mid-16th century, to Turkey and from there to Europe where coffee eventually became popular as well. Arabic coffee is an Intangible Cultural Heritage of Arab states, confirmed by UNESCO. Every year on 3 March, Yemenis celebrate the "Yemeni Coffee Day," a national festival to encourage coffee cultivation.

== Etymology ==
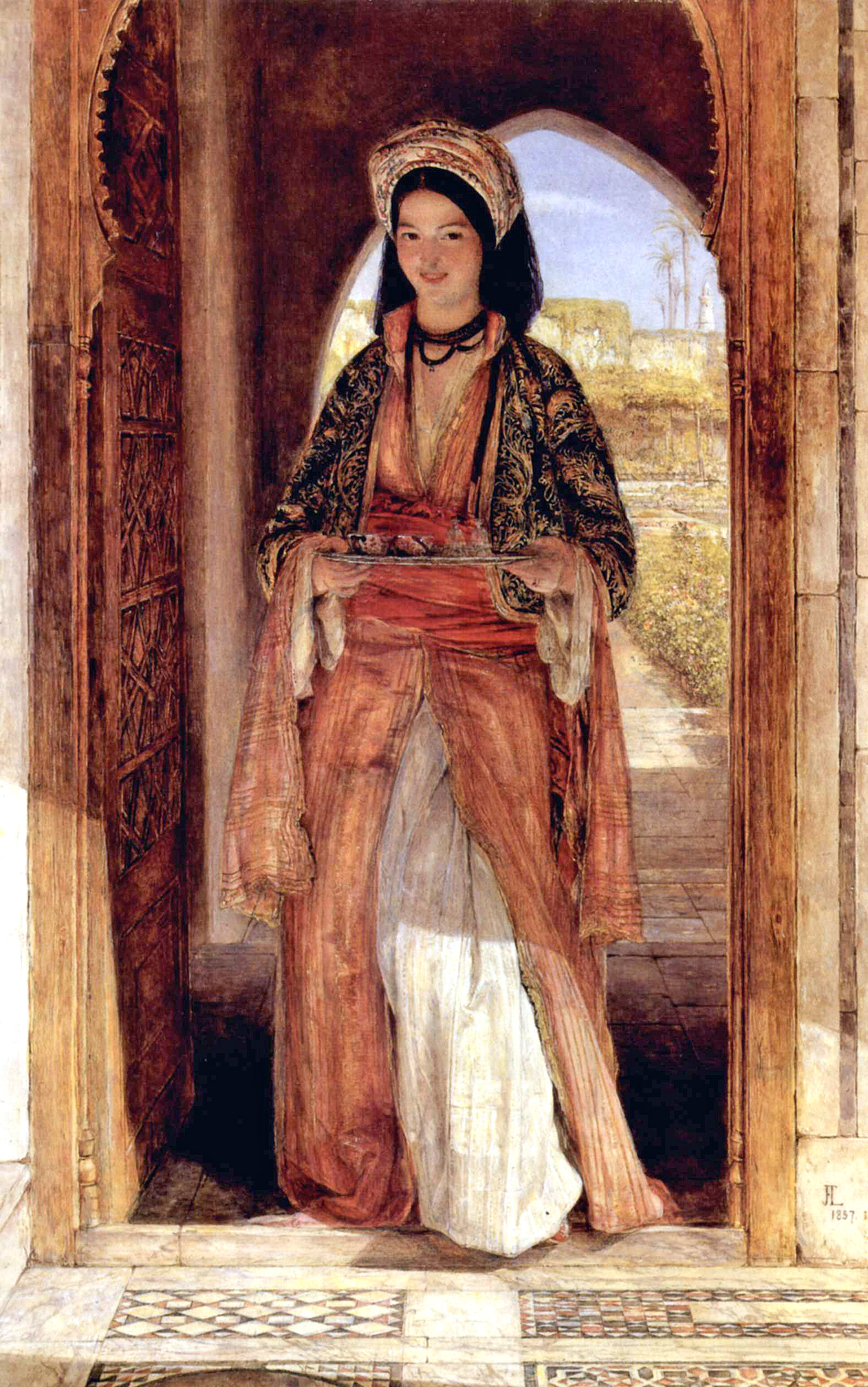
Arab woman (coffee bearer) in Cairo, Egypt, by John Frederick Lewis, 1857

The word coffee entered the English language in 1582 via the Dutch koffie, borrowed from the Ottoman Turkish kahve, in turn borrowed from the Arabic قَهْوَة (qahwa, 'coffee, a brew'). The word qahwah may have originally referred to the drink's reputation as an appetite suppressant from the word qahiya (Arabic: قَهِيَ, romanized: qahiya, lit. 'to lack hunger'). The name qahwah is not used for the berry or plant (the products of the region), which are known in Arabic as bunn. Semitic had a root qhh 'dark color', which became a natural designation for the beverage. According to this analysis, the feminine form qahwah (also meaning 'dark in color, dull(ing), dry, sour') also had the meaning of wine, which was also often dark in color.

== History ==
The earliest credible evidence of coffee drinking appears in the middle of the 15th century (but believed to be much earlier) from Yemen as coffee was in use in Yemen's Sufi monasteries. Sufis used it to keep themselves alert during their nighttime devotions. A translation of Al-Jaziri's manuscript traces the spread of coffee from Arabia Felix (the present-day Yemen) northward to Mecca and Medina, and then to the larger cities of Cairo, Damascus, Baghdad, and Constantinople. In 1511, it was forbidden for its stimulating effect by conservative, orthodox imams at a theological court in Mecca. However, these bans were to be overturned in 1524 by an order of the Ottoman Turkish Sultan Suleiman I, with Grand Mufti Mehmet Ebussuud el-İmadi issuing a fatwa allowing the consumption of coffee. In Cairo, Egypt, a similar ban was instituted in 1532, and the coffeehouses and warehouses containing coffee beans were sacked.

== Preparation ==
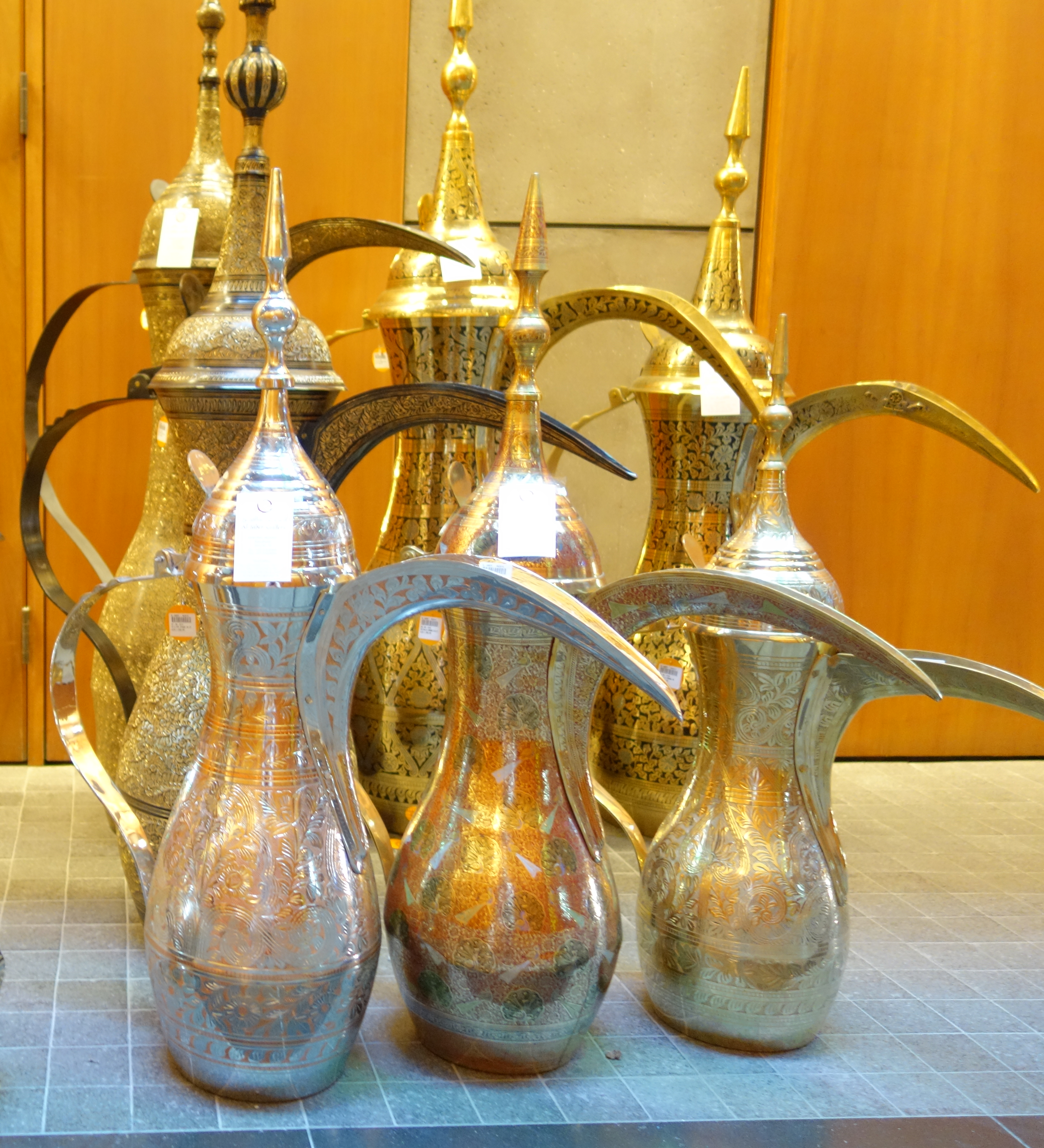
Dallahs

Arabic coffee is made from lightly to heavily roasted Arabica beans (165 to 210 °C (329 to 410 °F)) mixed with cardamom, and sometimes flavored with cloves or saffron.

Traditionally, the process begins by roasting green beans in a mihmas (a flat, long-handled iron or bronze roasting pan). Once roasted, the beans are cooled and then crushed in a mihbaj, a large wooden, stone, or brass mortar and pestle. The rhythmic sound of the ''mihbaj'' striking the mortar was historically used as a signal to neighbors that coffee was being prepared and guests were welcome.

The coffee is boiled but not filtered, producing a strong, concentrated drink. It is generally unsweetened (qahwah saada), though sugar may be added during preparation or serving. To balance the bitterness, it is often accompanied by dates, dried or candied fruit, nuts, or other sweets.

Arabic coffee is served in small, handleless cups called finjān.

=== Arabian Peninsula ===
In the Arabian Peninsula, Arabic coffee is typically brewed and served from a pot called a "dallah". It is almost always accompanied by dates and offered as a gesture of hospitality. In restaurants, it may be served by waiters called qahwaji.

Light roasting is common in Saudi Arabia, especially in the Najd and Hejaz regions, giving the coffee a golden or blonde color. Spices such as saffron, cardamom, cloves, and cinnamon may be added, with cardamom being the most essential.

In North Arabia, a darker variation known as qahwah shamāliyya (literally "Northern coffee") is prepared by roasting the beans for a longer time.

In the Gulf states, qahwa khaleeji (literally "Gulf coffee") typically has a bright yellow colour due to the heavy use of saffron and cardamom, and very light roasts.

In Yemen, Arabic coffee is often brewed with the addition of local spice blends called hawaij.

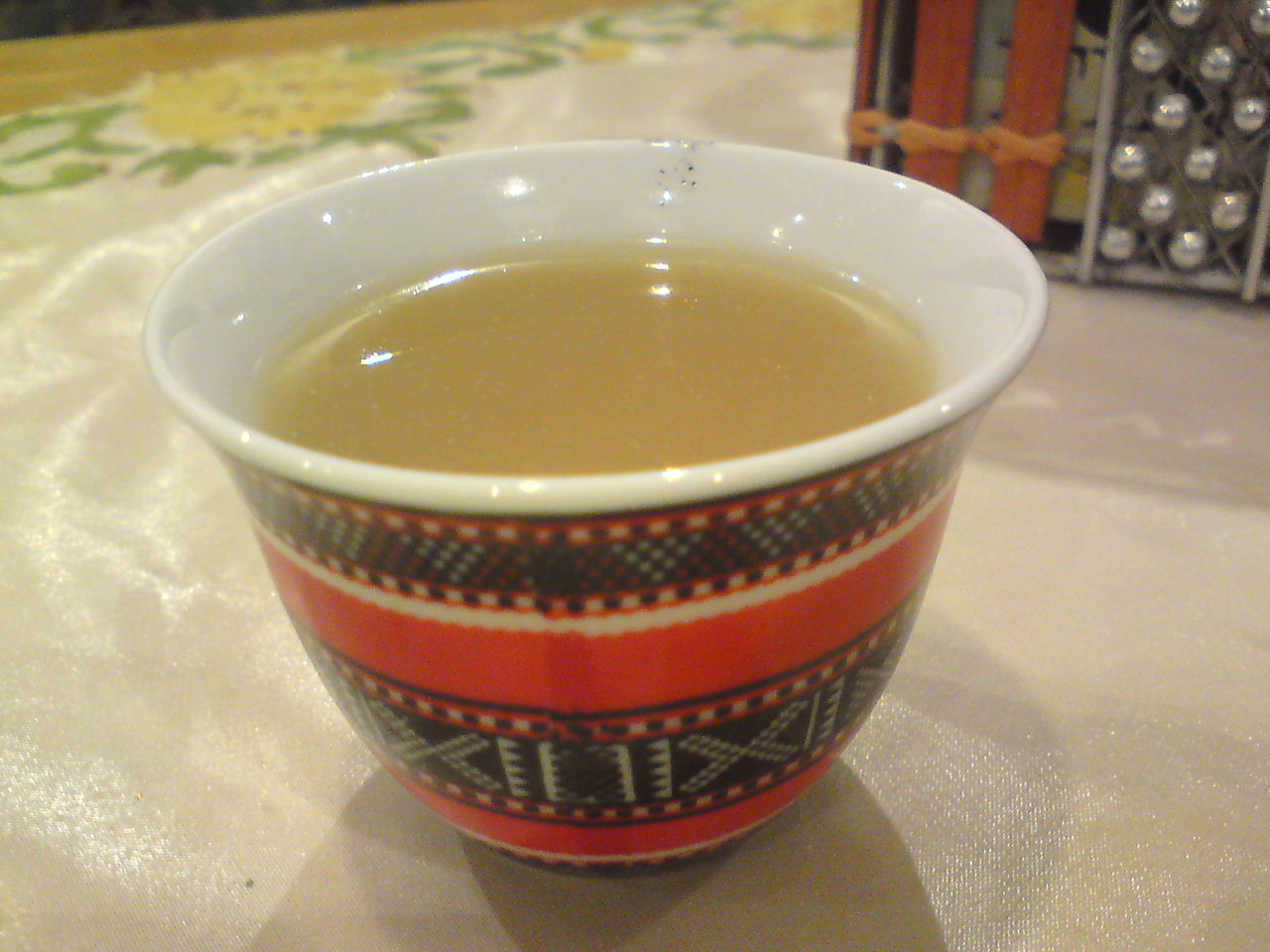
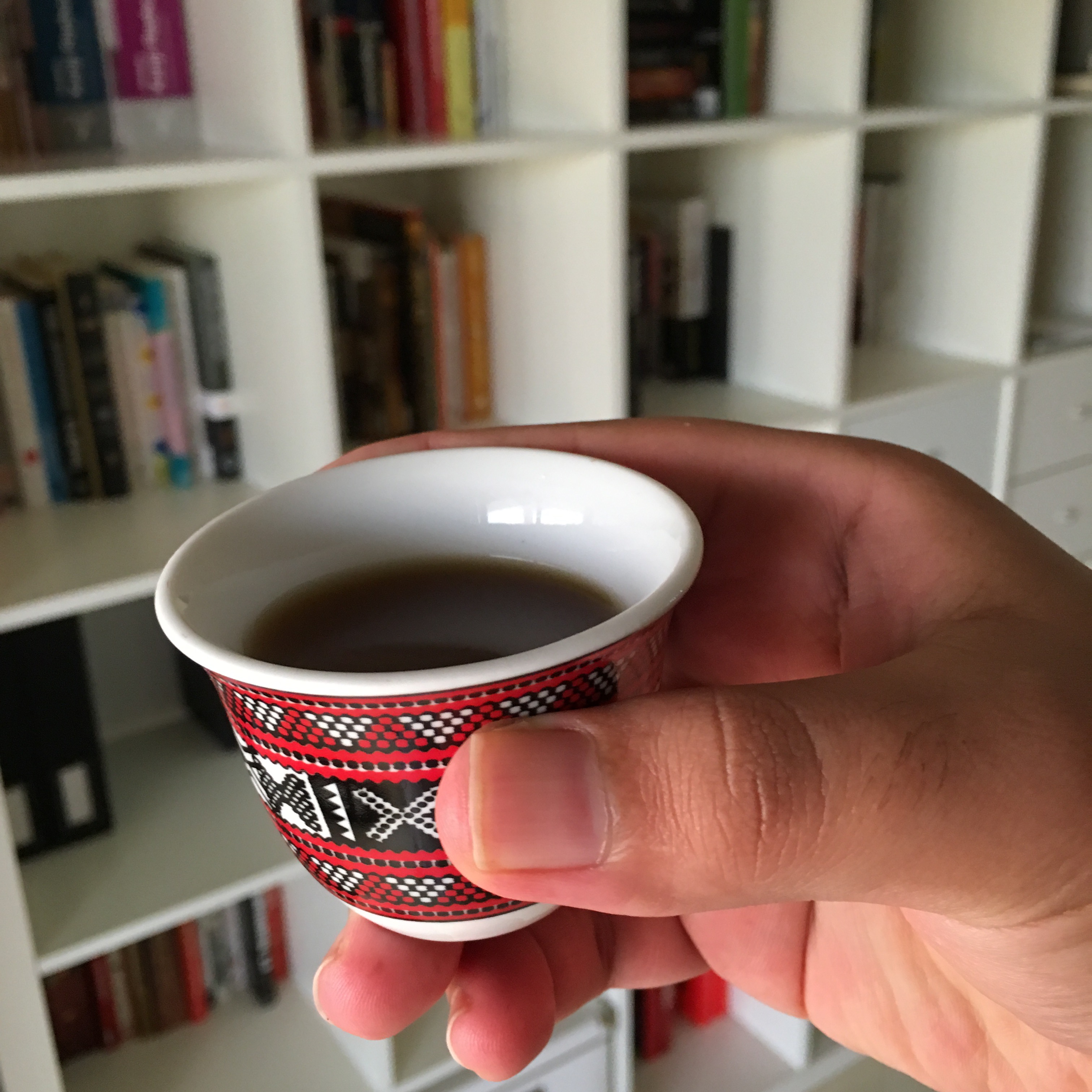
Hejazi/Najdi golden coffee (top), Levantine black coffee (bottom).

=== Levant ===
In the Levant, Arabic coffee is similar to Turkish coffee, but is typically spiced with cardamom. The beverage is brewed from finely ground coffee beans, using either a dark roast or a blend of light and dark roasts. It is traditionally prepared in a long-handled pot known as a "rakwa". In rural regions, among Bedouin communities, and when brewing larger quantities, a larger, long-spouted metal pot known as a "bakraj" is commonly utilized.

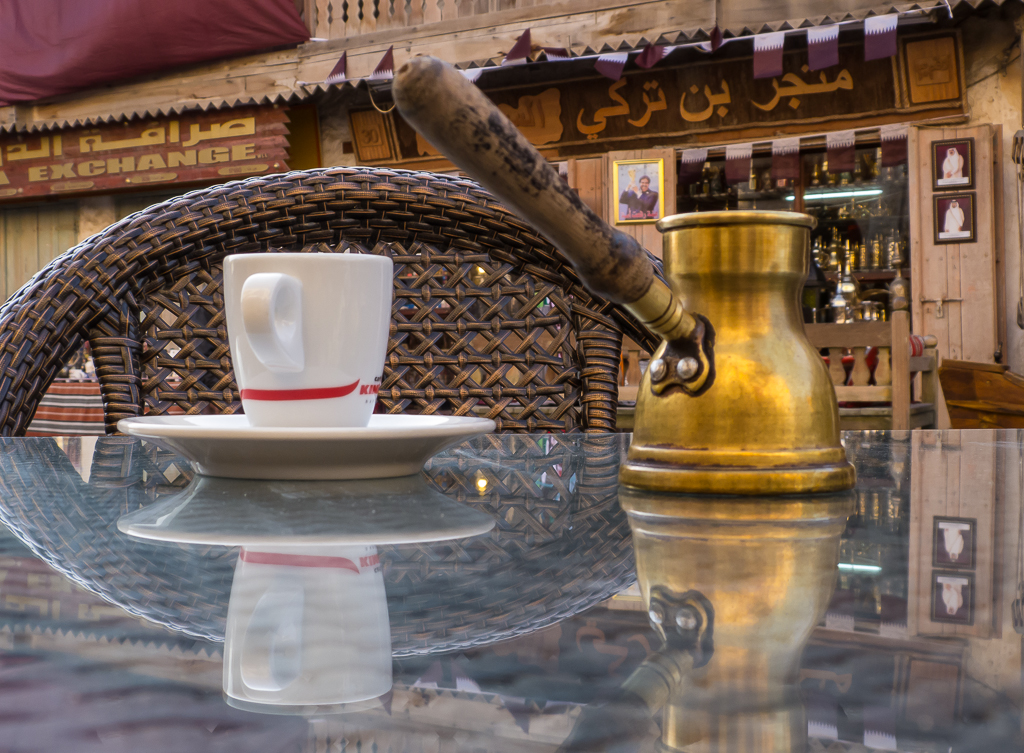
Rakwa, also called kanaka, ghallaya, and cezve.

The level of sweetness is reflected in the terminology used: unsweetened ("sada"), moderately sweetened ("wasat"), or sweet ("hilwe").

Serving coffee is often ceremonial. The host, or the eldest son, moves clockwise among guests, pouring coffee according to age and status. It is polite to accept three cups, with the last cup traditionally concluded by saying daymen (“always”), wishing the host continued means to serve coffee.

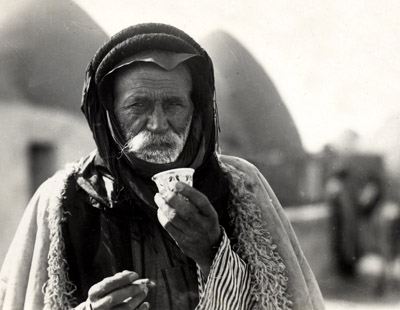
Bedouin from a beehive village in Aleppo, Syria, drinking traditional murra (bitter) coffee, 1930

A special type of coffee called qahwa murra ("bitter coffee") is commonly served among Bedouin and rural communities, primarily on special occasions. It is brewed for up to several hours using coarsely ground coffee beans and whole cardamom seeds, sometimes with the addition of a fermented coffee starter called khamira ("yeast"), and is always served unsweetened.

In Jordan, black, cardamom-flavored qahwah sādah (often called “welcome coffee”) remains a traditional sign of respect and an important part of hospitality. Serving coffee is central to Jordanian social life and is a customary way to honor guests.

=== Morocco ===
The national drink of Morocco is gunpowder green tea brewed with fresh mint. Espresso is very popular, but Arabic coffee is also widely consumed, especially on formal occasions. It is often made with the purpose of conducting a business deal and welcoming someone into one's home for the first time, and frequently served at weddings and on important occasions.

== Cultivation ==
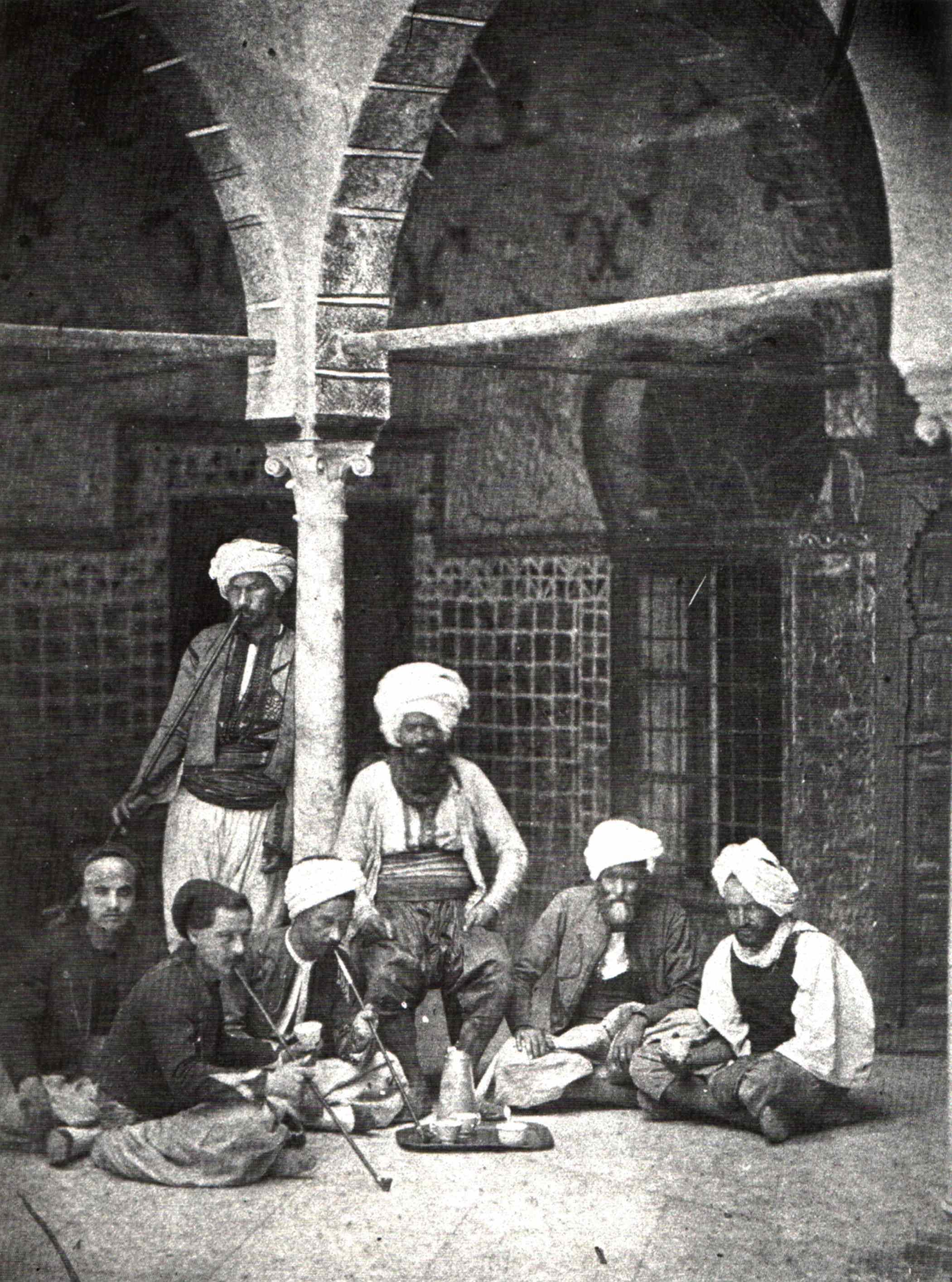
A maqhah in Ottoman Jerusalem in 1858

Much of the popularization of coffee is due to its cultivation in the Arab world, beginning in what is now Yemen, by Sufi monks in the 15th century. Through thousands of Arabs pilgrimaging to Mecca, the enjoyment and harvesting of coffee, or the "wine of Araby" spread to other Arab countries (e.g. Egypt, Syria) and eventually to a majority of the world through the 16th century.

Coffee, in addition to being essential in the home, became a major part of social life. Coffeehouses, qahwa قَهوة in Modern Standard Arabic, became "Schools of the Wise" as they developed into places of intellectual discussion, in addition to centers of relaxation and comradery.

== Coffeehouse ==
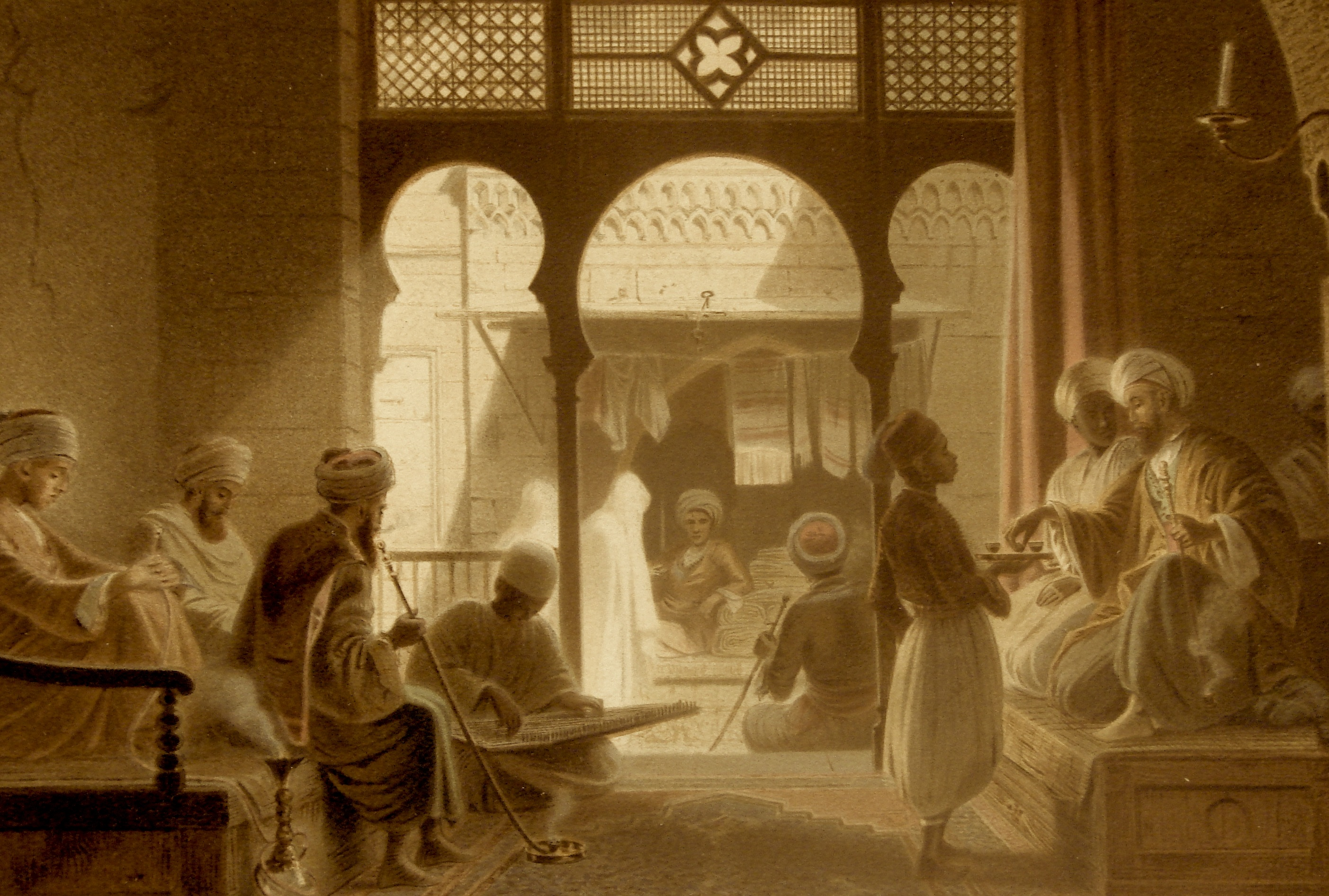
Coffeehouse in Cairo, c. 18th century

Coffeehouse culture began in the Arab world, and eventually spread to other areas of the world and blended with the local culture. Traditional Arab coffeehouses are places where mostly men meet to socialize over games, coffee, and water pipes (shisha or argille). Depending on where the coffeehouse is, its specialty differs. In Maghreb, green tea is served with mint or coffee is served Arab and/or European style. Arabic coffee, or Turkish coffee, is made in Egypt and the Levant countries. Arabic coffee is a very small amount of dark coffee boiled in a pot and presented in a demitasse cup. Particularly in Egypt, coffee is served mazbuuta, which means the amount of sugar will be "just right", about one teaspoon per cup. However, in the Arabian Peninsula, Arabic coffee is roasted in such a way that the coffee is almost clear. In all of the Arab world, it is traditional for the host to refill the guest's cup until politely signaled that the guest is finished.

== Serving ==
A man pours the traditional cup of Arabic coffee in the Levant.

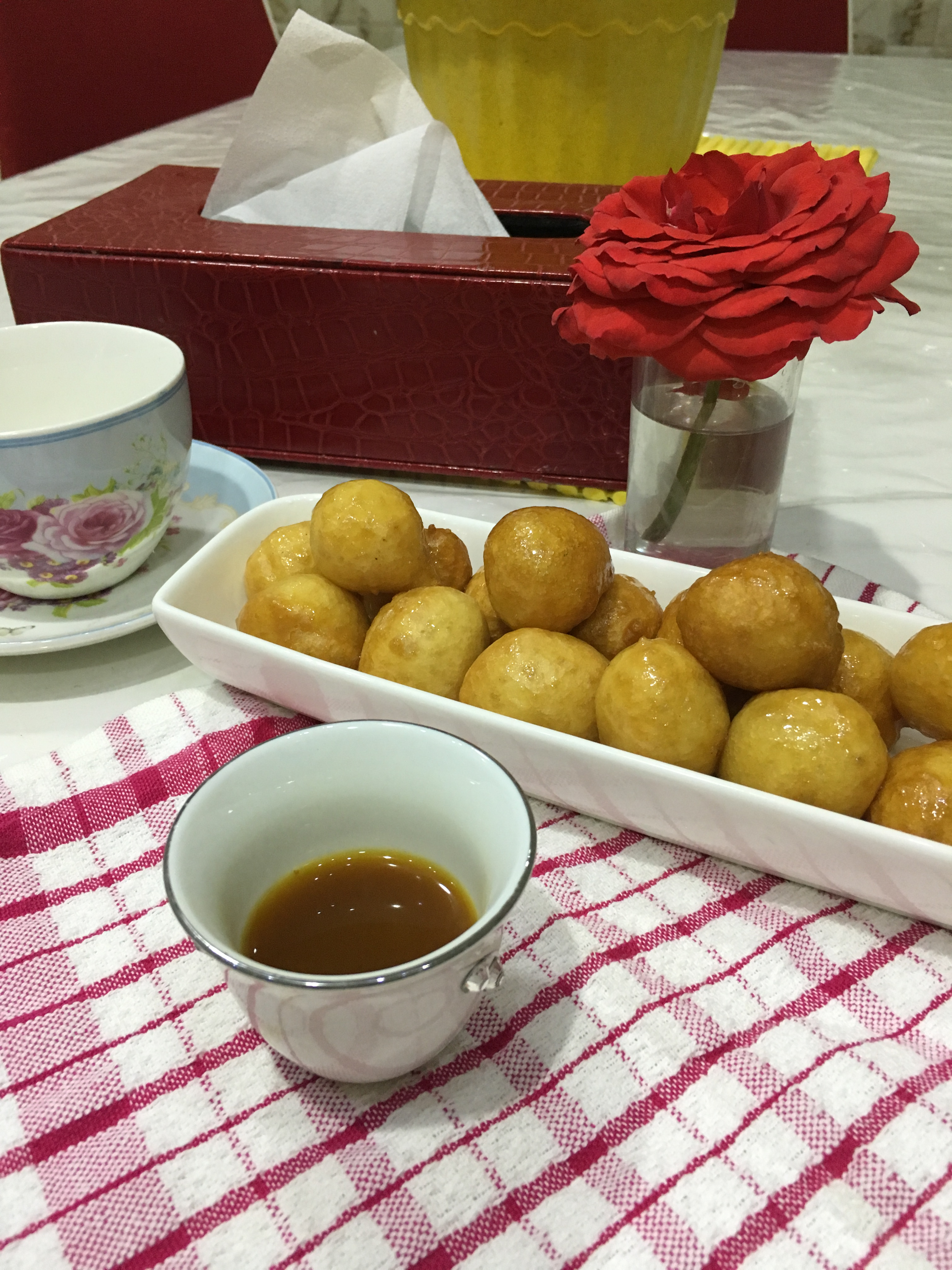
A cup of coffee with Lokma.

Coffee is part of the hospitality tradition of the inhabitants of the Arabian Peninsula, and guests are often welcomed with the phrase "Come in for coffee," regardless of the actual range of food and drinks served.

Arabic coffee is usually served just a few centiliters at a time. Arabic coffee is served following formal etiquette for the host, the visitor, and the server. The server is required to hold the dallah with the palm of his right hand positioned at the top, while using the left hand to hold the cup. In accordance with guest etiquette, the cup should be received and returned to the server by using the right hand. Priority is given to the oldest or most significant guest. The guest drinks it and if he wishes, he will gesture to the waiter not to pour any more. Otherwise, the host/waiter will continue to serve another few centilitres at a time until the guest indicates he has had enough. The most common practice is to drink only one cup since serving coffee serves as a ceremonial act of kindness and hospitality. Sometimes people also drink larger volumes during conversations.

== Habits ==
The cups are normally only filled partway, and the habit is to drink three cups. Arabic coffee has a prominent place in traditional Arab holidays and special events such as Ramadan and Eid.

=== Fortune-telling ===
Arabic coffee reading (Arabic: قراءة الفنجان, romanized: qirāʾat al-finjān), is similar to tea-leaf reading; the client is asked to consume strong fresh Arabic coffee leaving approximately a teaspoon of liquid in the cup. The cup is then inverted onto a saucer to allow the residual liquid to drain away and dry up. The reader will then interpret the patterns formed by the thick residue on the inside of the cup looking for symbols and letters.

=== Funeral ===
Arabic funerals gather families and extended relatives, who drink bitter and unsweetened coffee and recount the life and characteristics of the deceased. The men and women gather separately, and it is common to employ women whose job is to serve coffee to the other women. Male waiters serve the men. Arab Muslims and Christians share this tradition.

== Nutrition facts ==
In its plain form, Arabic coffee is considered a low-calorie beverage with minimal macronutrient content. A small cup of Arabic coffee has almost no calories or fat.

The exact nutritional values may vary depending on the roast level, brewing method, and whether additives such as sugar or milk are included.

== Gallery ==
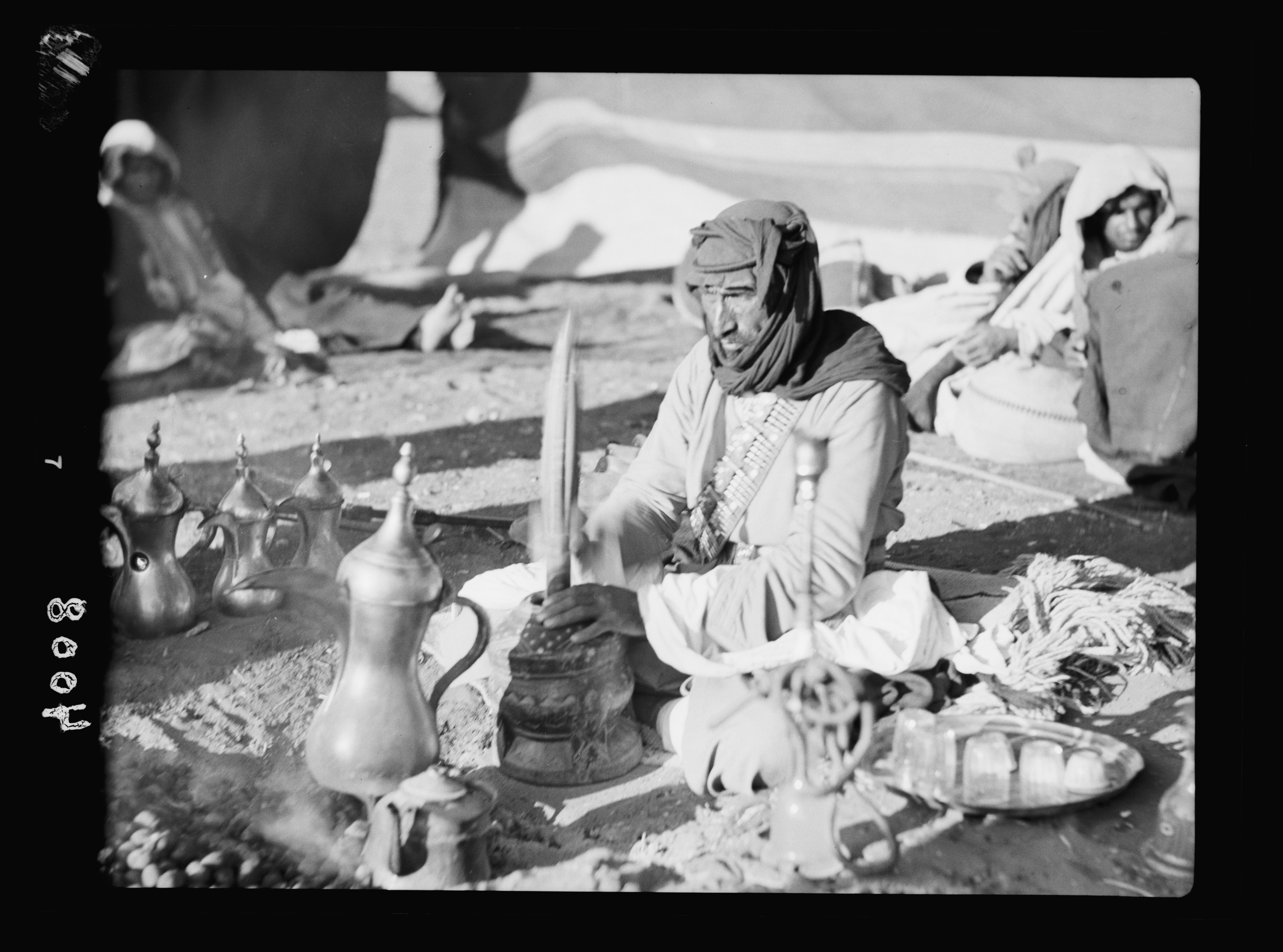
Bedouin in pounding coffee in a mihbaj, Jordan

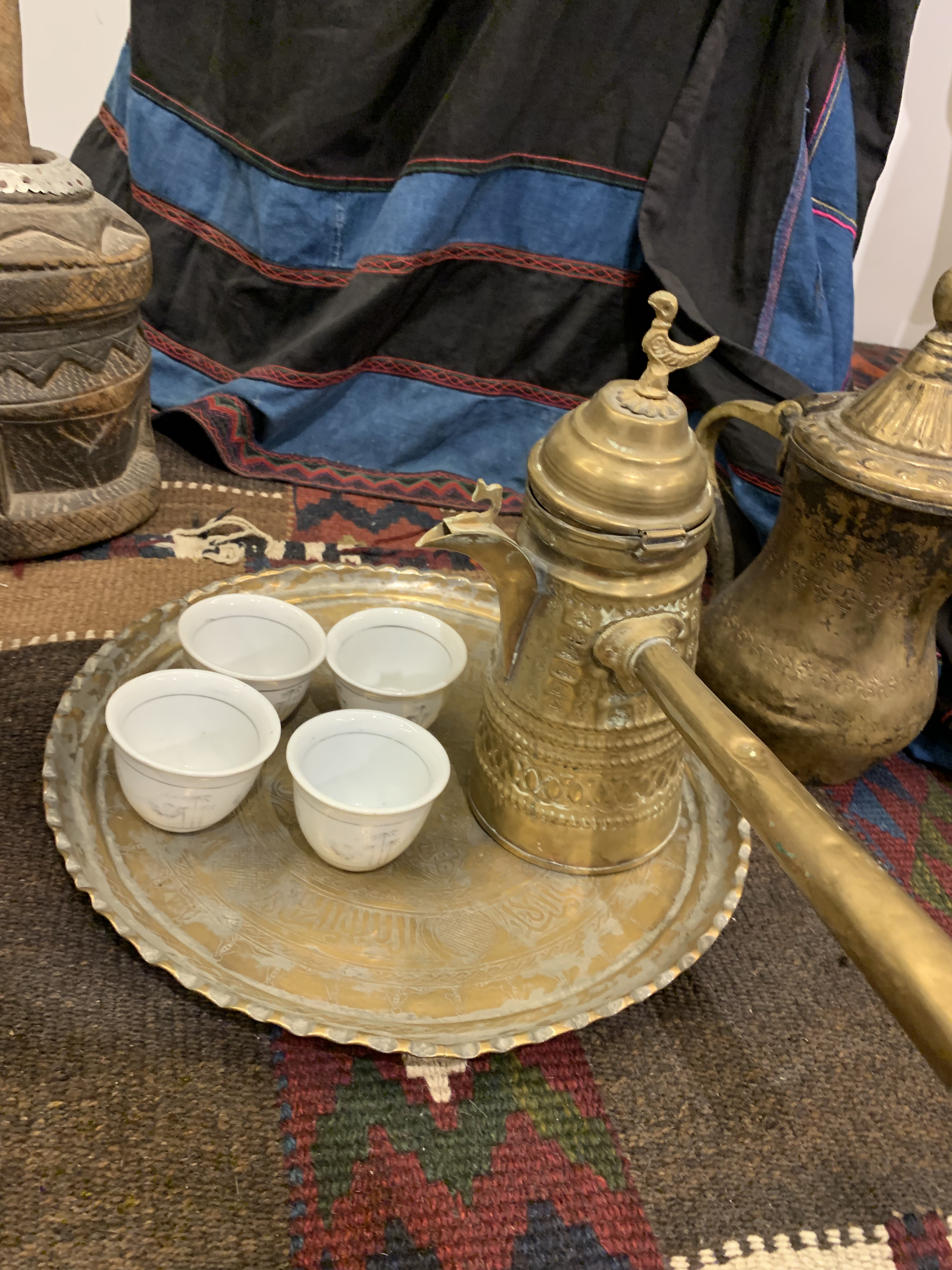
A traditional arabic coffee set

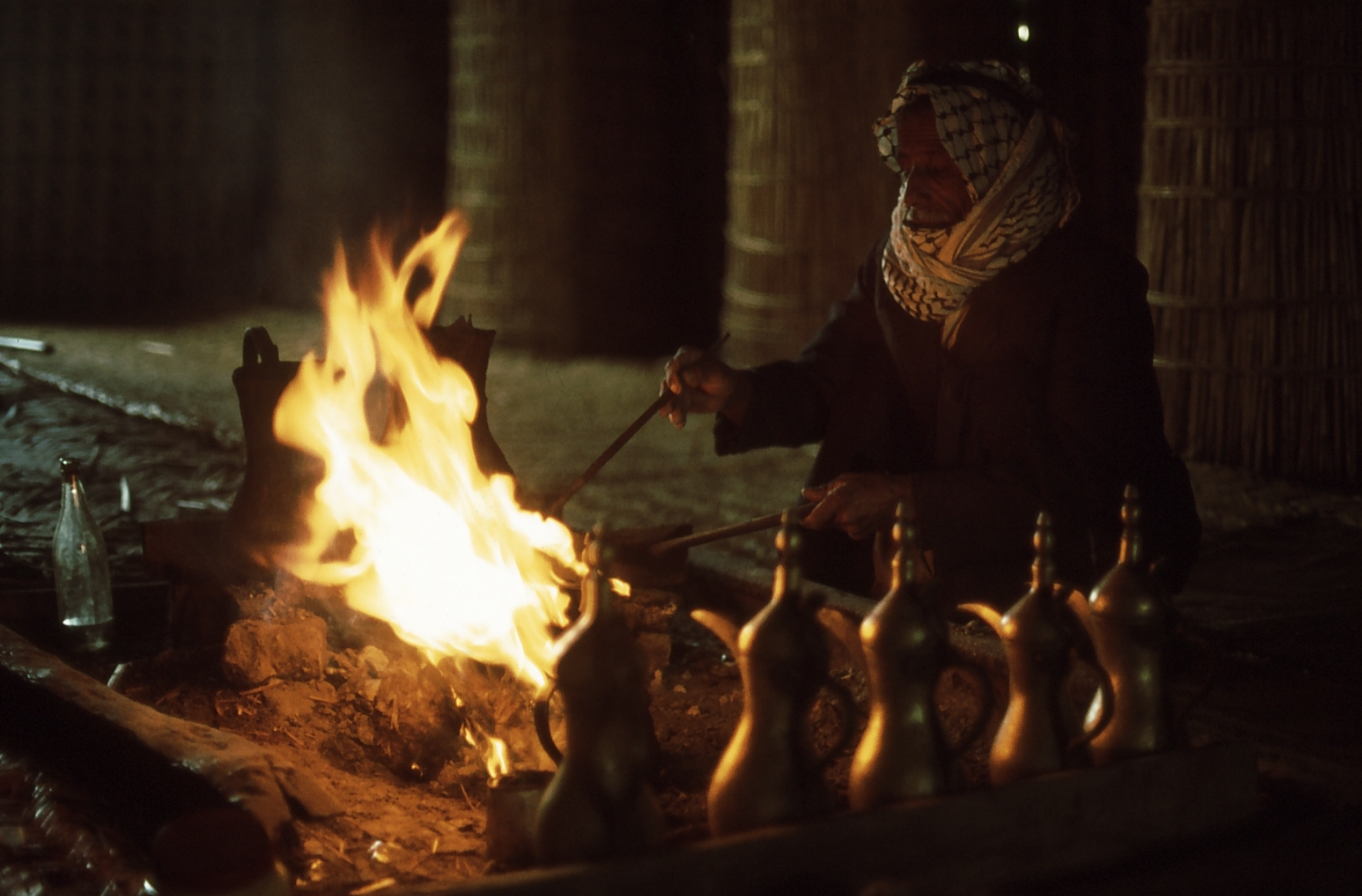
Roasting coffee over the fire, Iraq

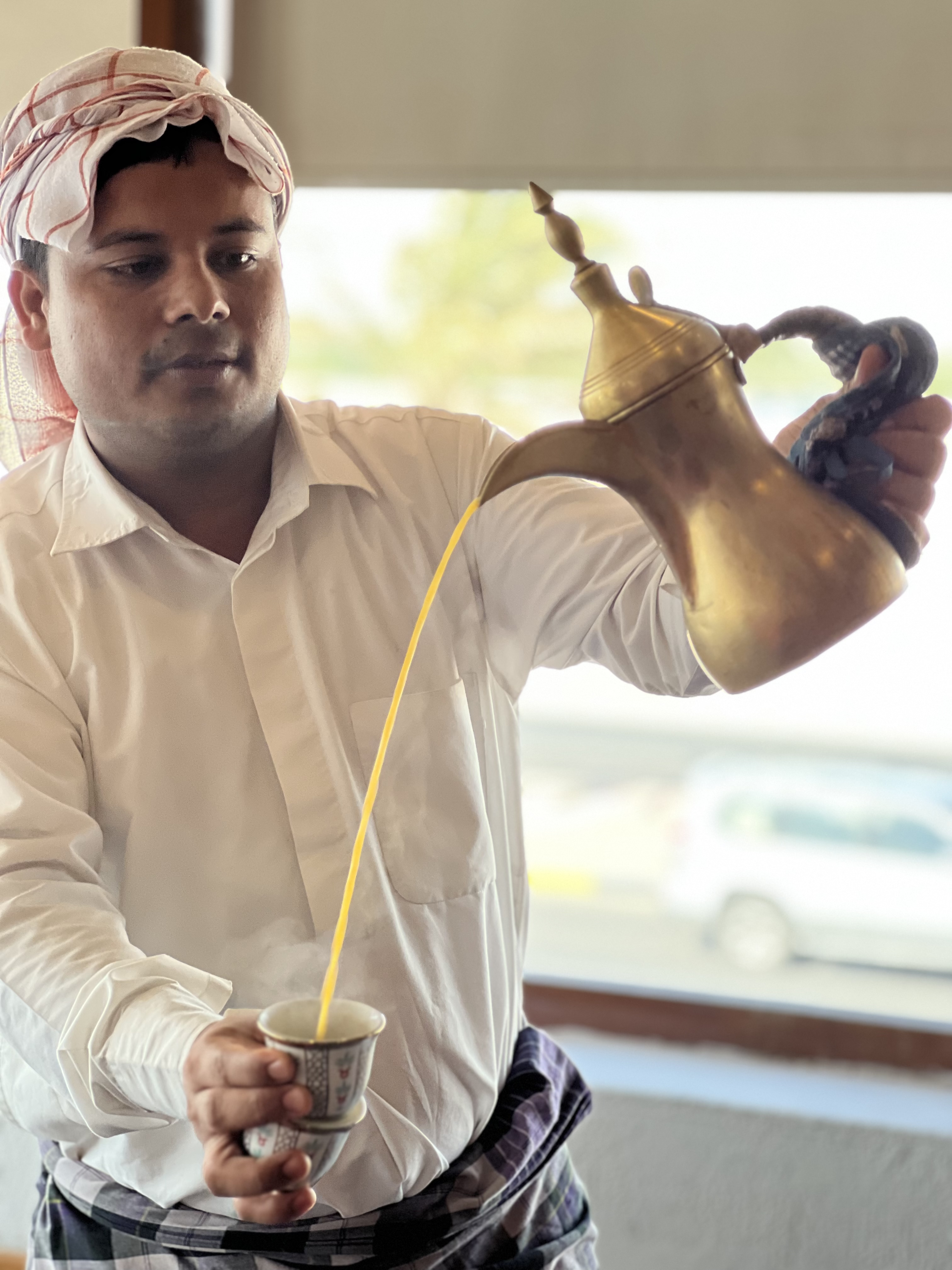
Serving coffee, Bahrain

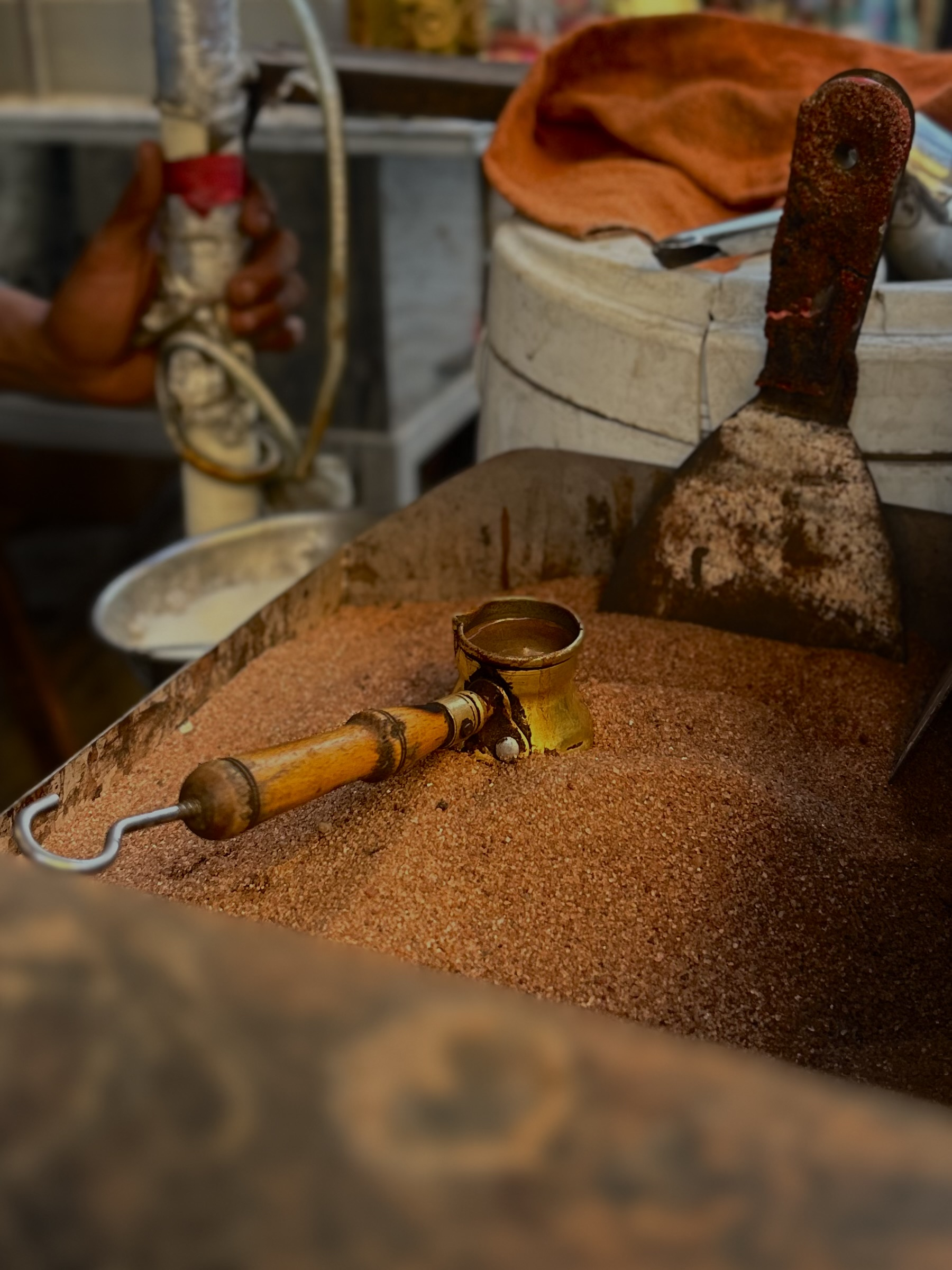
Brewing coffee over hot sand, Egypt

== See also ==
- Arabic tea
- Arab cuisine
- Coffee in Islam
- Home roasting coffee
- Green coffee
- Turkish coffee
