= Mombar =

Ottoman rice and intestine sausage

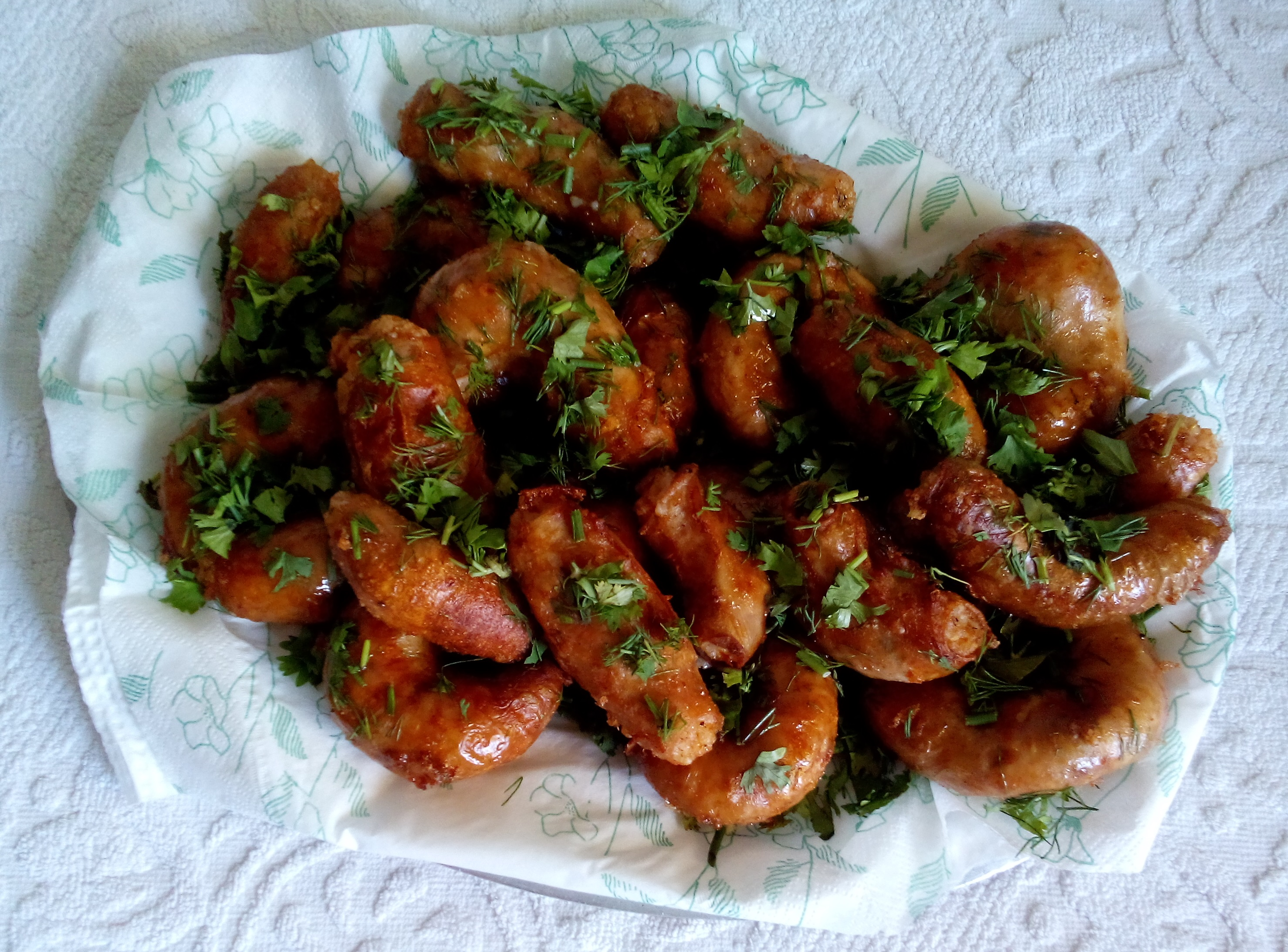
- Egyptian Mombar
- Type: Sausage
- Main ingredients: Sheep intestines, rice
- Ingredients generally used: Onions, spices, tomato sauce

Mombar (Arabic: ممبار) is a rice sausage dish. Different versions of it with various names are eaten in Syria, and Libya. In Egypt it is made from sheep casing stuffed with a rice mixture and deep fried.

== History ==
Ottoman culinary sources describe bumbar dolması as stuffed large intestine prepared with fillings that could include minced meat, lung, liver, heart, rice, onion, pine nuts, raisins, and spices. The dish was boiled and sometimes sliced and fried in butter after cooking, and was commonly prepared together with stuffed abomasum (şirden). According to historian Priscilla Mary Işın, the dish was particularly associated with the month of Ramadan; she also noted that it appeared under the name toğril in Dīwān Lughāt al-Turk.

Mombar originated in Ottoman cuisine, and eventually spread into Iraqi, Egyptian, and Levantine cuisine. A recipe for mumbar (stuffed intestine) appears in the 19th century Ottoman cookbook Melceü't-Tabbâhîn.

== Regional variants ==
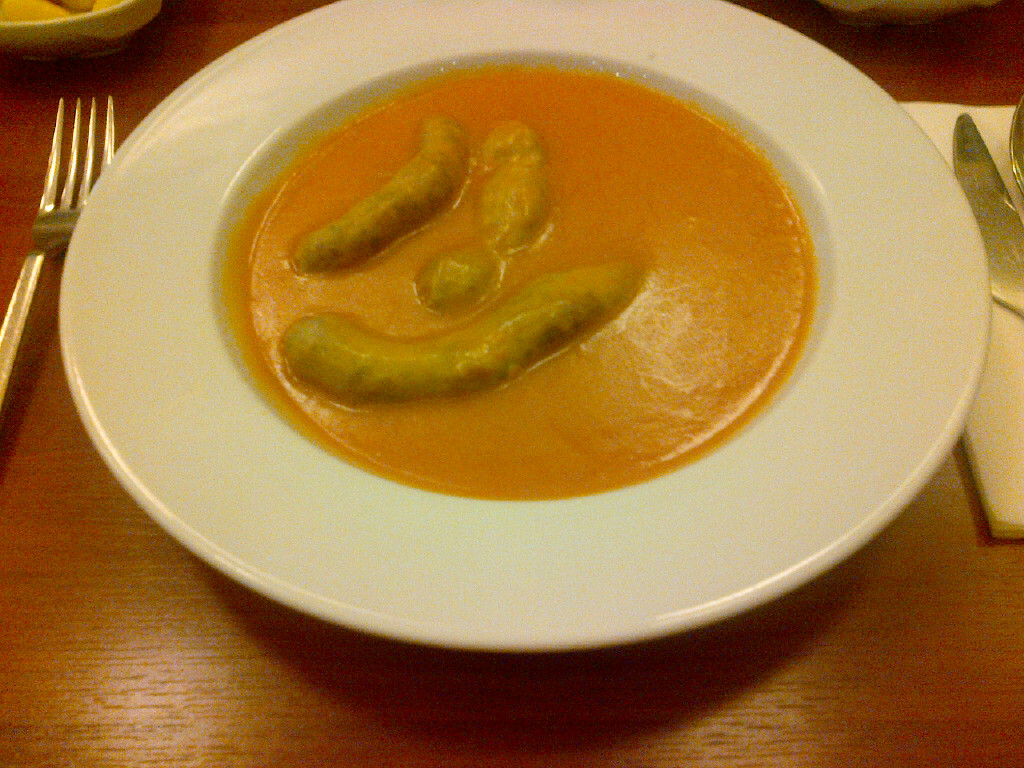
Turkish mumbar

A rough Levantine equivalent of Egyptian mombar is called qubawat (Arabic: قباوات) in Syria; while in Jordan and Palestine it is known as fawaregh (Arabic: فوارغ), although these are usually made with a mixture of rice and meat and boiled in water. Another variant eaten in parts of North Africa is known as usban (Arabic: عصبان).

Mumbar dolması (Turkish, also bumbar; Armenian: փոր լցոնած or դալակ դոլմա, keebah; Arabic: فوارغ) is a sausage or dolma of Anatolian origin that is made with mutton, rice, black pepper, salt and cinnamon stuffed into an intestine casing. After the sausage has been cooked by boiling and allowed to cool, it is sliced and fried in butter. Sometimes it is dipped in an egg batter before being fried.

== Culture ==
Palestinians make fawaregh (intestine sausages) and karshat (Arabic: كرشات, stuffed stomachs) on Eid al-Adha using the meat of the sacrificed animal. Egyptian mombar is common during Eid al-Adha as well; it is commonly served as a side dish to stuffed roasted squab.

== See also ==
- Egyptian cuisine
- List of Middle Eastern dishes
- List of African dishes
- List of stuffed dishes
- Merguez, North African sausage
- Usban, North African rice-filled sausage
