= Libyan cuisine =

Culinary traditions of Libya

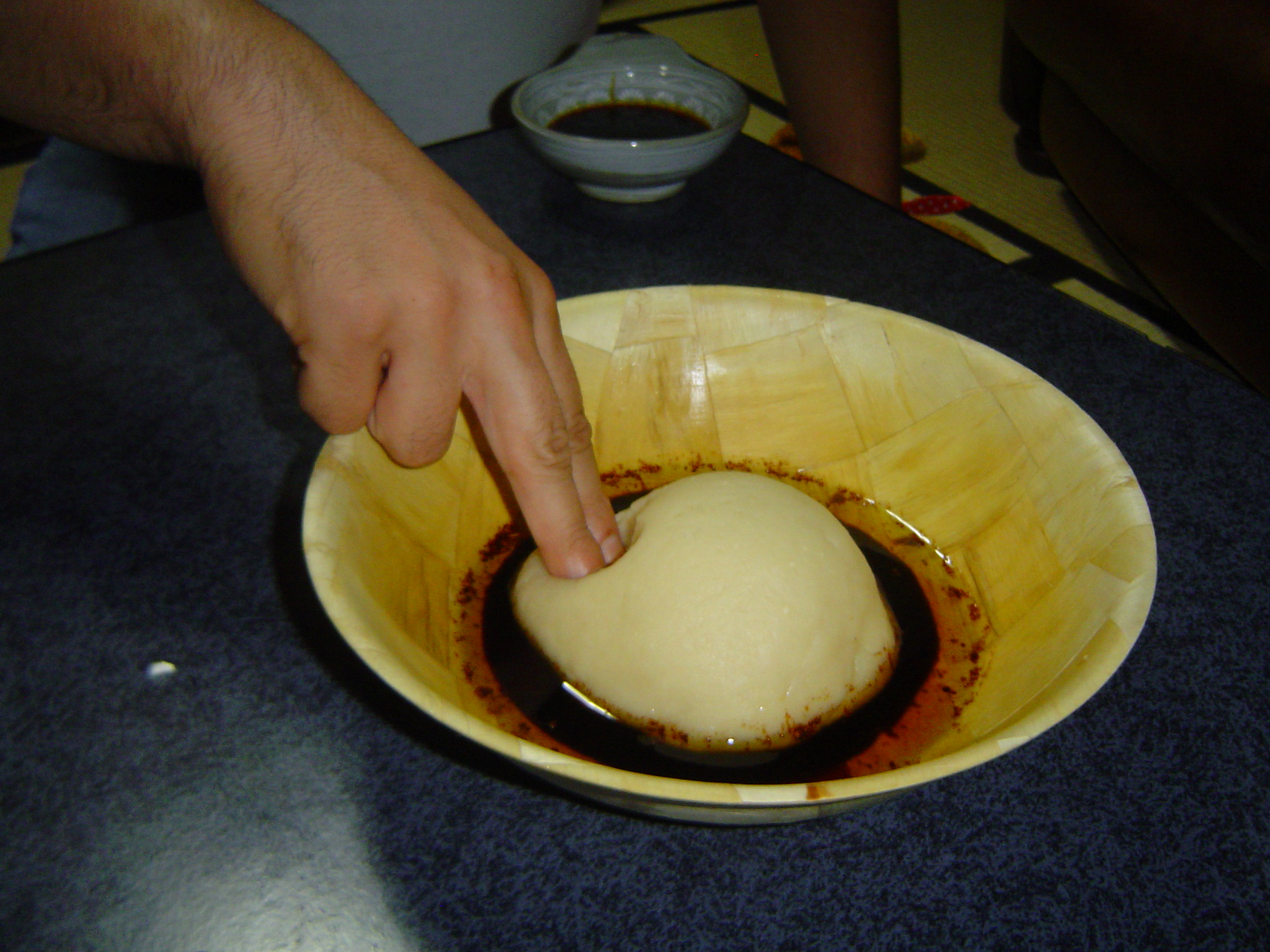
Libyan asida served with rub and molten sheep ghee; the traditional way to eat Libyan asida is to do so using the index and middle fingers of the right hand.

Location of Libya

Libyan cuisine (Arabic: المطبخ الليبي) is a diverse culinary tradition shaped by Amazigh, Arab, Ottoman, and Mediterranean influences, reflecting both the country's geography and its historical interactions with neighboring cultures. Food customs vary between the coastal and inland regions. Along the Mediterranean coast, particularly in Tripoli, the cuisine features seafood, olive oil, grains, and fresh herbs, with noticeable influence from Italian cuisine due to Libya's colonial history. Pasta is widely consumed, and dishes like imbakbaka, a spiced one-pot pasta, are common in households. In eastern Libya, the same dish is often referred to as macarona jariya.

Mutton is the most frequently consumed meat throughout the country, while camel meat is more typical in southern regions. One of the most recognizable Libyan dishes is bazin, an unleavened bread prepared with barley, water and salt. Bazin is prepared by boiling barley flour in water and then beating it to create a dough using a magraf, which is a unique stick designed for this purpose.

Tuna is also widely consumed, especially in canned form, and is a staple of school lunches and casual meals, making it one of the most accessible protein sources across the country. While fruit like figs, dates, oranges, apricots, and olives are abundant, especially in coastal regions, legumes and grains are dietary mainstays throughout the country. Pasta is common, and many seafood dishes are available. Southern Libyan cuisine is more traditionally Arab, and Amazigh. Meals in the south often center on preserved ingredients such as dried meats, fermented dairy, barley, and hardy legumes, reflecting both the arid landscape and nomadic roots of the region’s communities. As in many Muslim-majority societies, the consumption of pork is prohibited under Islamic law, and the sale and public consumption of alcohol are also forbidden.

== Ingredients ==
Libyan cuisine features a complex and rich use of spices that create layered flavors. Harissa, a chili paste made from chili peppers, garlic, caraway, and cumin, is commonly used as a condiment. Traditional spice blends such as bzarr, which includes coriander, caraway, garlic, turmeric, ginger, and dried chili peppers, and bokharat, composed of black pepper, paprika, cumin, cloves, nutmeg, cinnamon, and cardamom, are essential for marinating meats and flavoring stews. Other frequently used spices include rosemary, basil, fennel seed, aniseed, fenugreek, spearmint, allspice, saffron, and rosebud.

Libyan culinary ingredients include the following typical elements:

- Condiments and flavorings: harissa, lemon juice, sugar syrup, rose water, orange blossom water, jasmine water and geranium water.
- Eggs.
- Meats: lamb and mutton, veal, beef, seafood, camel and chicken.
- Fish and seafood: tuna, squid (calamari), octopus, shrimp, prawns, anchovies, eel, sardines, mackerel, red snapper, sea bream, grouper, sea bass and mussels.
- Fruits: lemons, oranges, figs, dates, olives, grapes, apricots, peaches, watermelons, pomegranates, prickly pears, bananas, mangos and quince.
- Nuts and seeds: hazelnuts, pistachios, almonds, cashews, chestnuts, pine nuts, sunflower seeds and peanuts.
- Vegetables: onions, bell peppers, carrots, chickpeas, romano beans, fava beans, runner beans, cannellini beans, peas, pumpkins, tomatoes, capers, turnips, beets, cabbage, cauliflower, potatoes, chili peppers, zucchini, cucumbers and eggplant.

== Meat and poultry ==
Lamb and mutton are the most commonly consumed meats in Libya, though beef and chicken are also eaten. Gideed is a type of preserved meat made using an ancient method of salting and sun-drying cuts of lamb or camel, then storing them in olive oil for long-term use. It is traditionally added to soups, couscous, and stews, especially during the colder months or when fresh meat is scarce. Another traditional cooking method is bourdeem, where lamb is slow-cooked in an underground pit lined with hot coals alongside onions, tomatoes, and potatoes. This primitive technique imparts a smoky flavor and produces tender, fall-apart meat, commonly prepared for special occasions such as Eid al-Adha. Other types of meat:

- Kebab
- Kofta
- Kibbeh
- Shwaya refers to barbecue, a popular cooking method especially during Eid al-Adha. It primarily involves lamb or mutton, reflecting the festival's traditional slaughtering practices, though chicken barbecue is also common. The meat is typically cooked on skewers or directly grilled over a small open grill, giving it a distinct smoky flavor.

== Main dishes ==
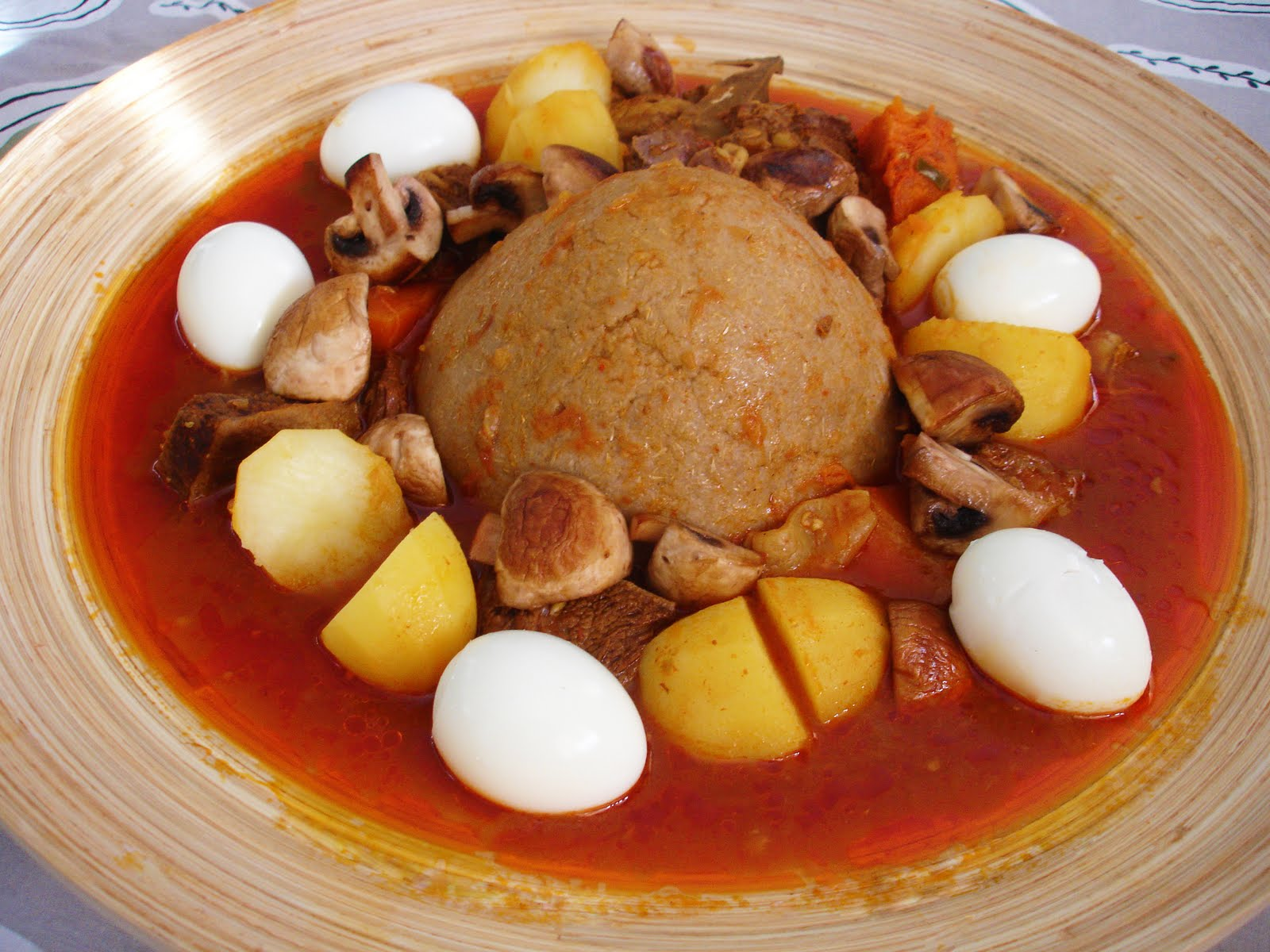
Bazin (center) served with a stew and whole hard-boiled eggs

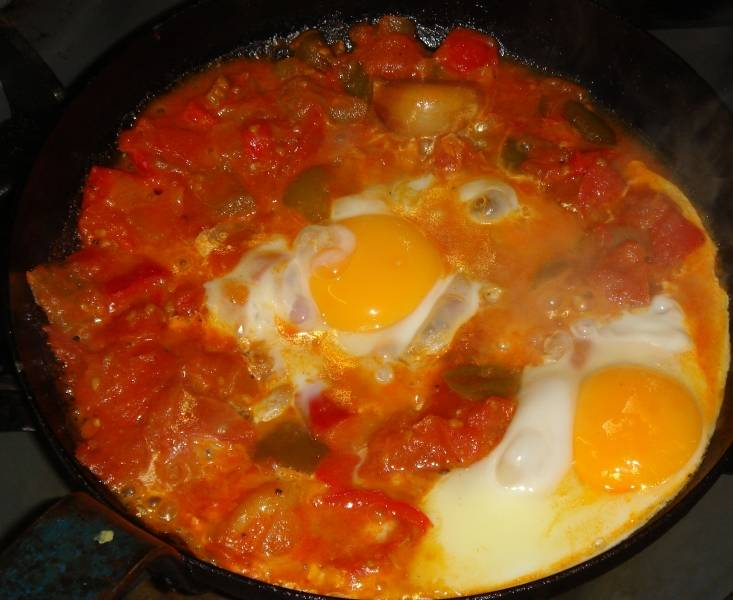
Egg shakshouka

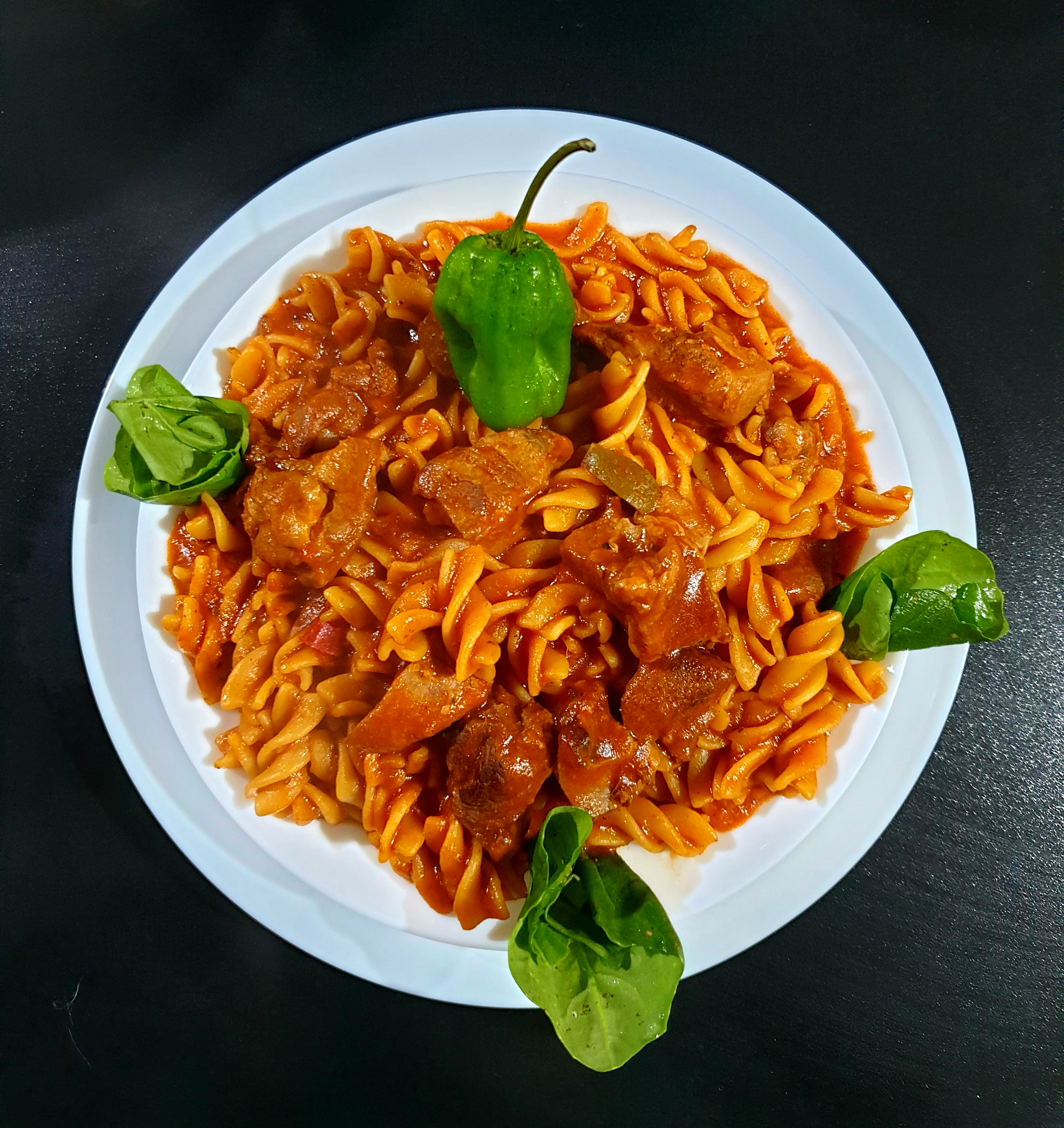
Mbakbaka

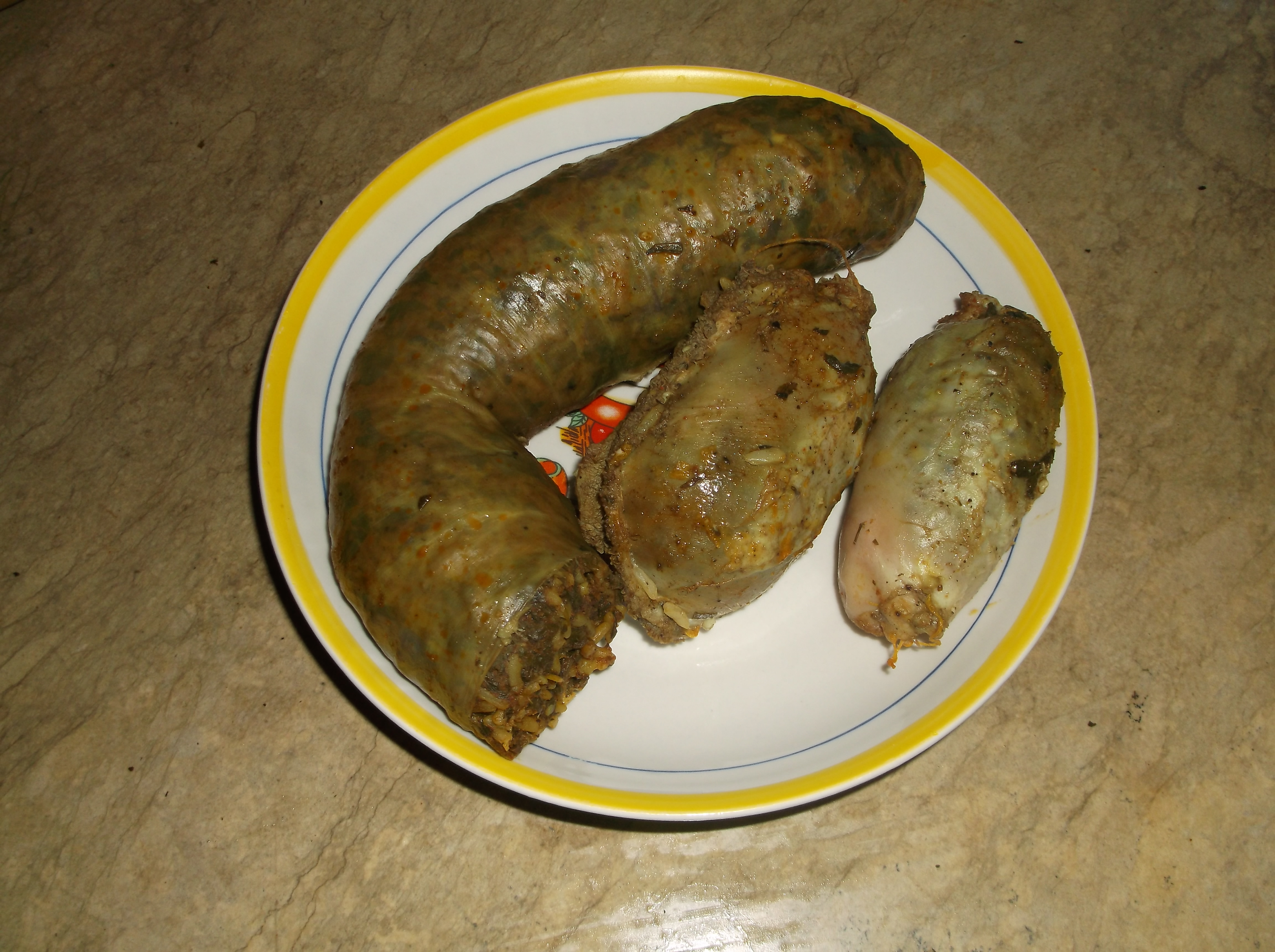
Usban

Bazin is a traditional Libyan dish made with barley flour and a small amount of plain flour. The mixture is boiled in salted water to form a dense dough, which is then shaped into a smooth, rounded dome placed at the center of the serving dish. Surrounding the dough is a thick sauce prepared by frying chopped onions with lamb, turmeric, salt, cayenne pepper, black pepper, fenugreek, sweet paprika, and tomato paste. Potatoes may be added to the sauce, and the final presentation often includes boiled eggs arranged around the dough. The dish is typically served with lemon wedges and either fresh or pickled chili peppers, known locally as amsyar.

Other popular Libyan dishes include batata mubattana (stuffed potato), consisting of fried potato slices filled with seasoned minced meat and coated with egg and breadcrumbs. Macarona imbakbaka, a one-pot pasta dish cooked in a spiced tomato-based sauce with meat, is widely consumed, especially in colder months. Couscous is also common, often steamed and served with lamb or chicken and vegetables, and is particularly associated with festive and communal meals. Shakshouka, a dish of eggs poached in a sauce of tomatoes, peppers, onions, and spices, is eaten throughout Libya and is especially popular as a breakfast or light meal.

These dishes represent only a small portion of Libya's broader culinary repertoire. Traditional Libyan meals vary by region and occasion, but many core ingredients and preparation methods are shared across the country. Common dishes include:

- Bazin.
- Rishta.
- Imgata (also known as rishta bourma) is a Libyan dish made with fresh homemade pasta cooked in a tomato-based sauce, often prepared with gideed.
- Imbakbaka or mbakbaka, a type of stew with pasta and meat, influenced by Italian minestrone
- Shakshouka is prepared using aged mutton or lamb jerky as the meat base of the meal, and is considered a traditional breakfast dish.
- Rishta cescas
- Haraime is a spicy fish stew with tomatoes from Libya. The name of the dish comes from the Arabic word for "hot".
- Al-tabahij is a traditional Libyan dish typically made with fish and layered vegetables, similar to Egyptian moussaka. Though once less common, it has recently regained popularity.
- Glaya is a popular traditional dish known for its simplicity and ease of preparation. Liver is cooked with onions, peppers, and spices in oil until tender and the flavors meld together.
- Couscous, a North African dish of semolina
- Filfel chuma or maseer, spicy pickled peppers, lemon, hot peppers and crushed garlic.
- Hassaa, type of gravy
- Rub is a thick dark brown, very sweet syrup extracted from dates or carob that is widely used in Libya, usually with asida.
- Shorba, lamb and vegetable soup with mint and tomato paste
- Usban zeer
- Macarona bil-bechamel
- Fettat is a traditional Libyan dish consisting of bread layers soaked in broth.
- Molokhiya, a dish made from the leaves of Corchorus olitorius, commonly known in English as jute.
- Rozz bel-leben. In other Arab countries, rozz bel-leben typically refers to a sweet rice pudding. In Libya, however, it is a savory dish made from short-grain rice cooked in water and fermented milk (such as buttermilk or kefir), then topped with butter or olive oil and lemon juice. There are other variations that use handmade pasta known as imgata or rishta al-Burma in place of rice.
- Macarona mboukhka bel-tgliya, also known as macarona bel-busla, is a Libyan pasta dish where steamed pasta is served with a spiced onion and chickpea sauce, often cooked with meat. It is similar to the Algerian dish known as rechta.
- Ful medames
- Fasoulia, a dish made with white runner beans or cannellini beans stewed in a tomato-based sauce. It often includes kercha and is typically served alongside fresh, hot bread.
- Usban, a traditional Libyan food made of guts stuffed with organs and herbs.
- Bamia, a stew prepared using lamb, okra and tomatoes as primary ingredients.
- Shawerma
- Ta‘meya, primarily from soaked, peeled fava beans mixed with eggs, herbs like coriander and parsley, onions, garlic, and spices such as cumin and coriander.

== Appetizers, light dishes, and salads ==
- Sharmoula is a spicy, garlicky condiment made with tomatoes, vinegar, oil, and sometimes olives or tuna. It is used as a dip or spread.
- Amsyar is a quick-pickled vegetable relish that accompanies a wide variety of main dishes. It is especially essential when served alongside imabwakh.
- Bureek, turnovers
- Mtabal is a traditional Levantine aubergine dish popular throughout the Arab world. Unlike baba ghanoush, which involves roasting, peeling, and blending the aubergine into a smooth paste with tahini and lemon juice, mtabal is prepared by roasting the aubergine until smoky, then dicing it and serving it with tahini and olive oil drizzled on top, giving it a coarser, chunkier texture.
- Salata arabiya is a traditional chopped salad consisting of tomatoes, cucumbers, onions, dressed simply with lemon juice and olive oil.
- Salata mechouia, which translates to "roasted salad," serves both as a salad and a hot sauce commonly eaten alongside barbecued dishes. Traditionally, the vegetables are grilled over an open fire while the meat marinates, imparting a smoky flavor, though it is also sometimes prepared using a home grill.
- Abrak is made by wrapping vine leaves or cabbage leaves around a traditional Mahshi filling of rice, meat, and herbs. In Libya, abrak is typically spicier than its Eastern Arab counterpart, where it is known as Mahshi Waraq Enab and often features a vegetarian filling.
- Ejja is a traditional Libyan egg dish resembling an omelet or frittata, featuring chopped potatoes, tomatoes, chilies, and fresh herbs like coriander or parsley. While it is typically baked in the oven, it can also be prepared in a frying pan. Ejja is commonly served at the iftar table alongside Libyan soup or wrapped in ftat, a type of stove-top flatbread.
- Khobza bil ‘Ashab is a traditional Libyan savory bread made from sfinz dough, known for its soft and spongy texture. It is commonly served during evening gatherings where tea, often infused with flavors such as mint, sage, almonds, or rose petals, is eaten alongside an assortment of savory finger foods.
- Khbeiza are stuffed breads that come in various shapes, including mini-loaves, small buns, ping-pong-sized balls, or crescents. Common fillings include white cheese with dried mint or cheese and olives. However, tuna mixed with harissa remains the most popular filling for these breads.
- Kayka harra, prepared by baking a rich batter made from eggs, milk, oil, flour, and baking powder, enhanced with lemon juice and spices. The batter is mixed with sautéed onions, garlic, parsley, and coriander, then layered with a filling of fried potatoes, tomatoes, harissa, olives, and cheese cubes. It is baked until the top is golden, and is eaten across Libya.
- Broudou is a traditional Libyan vegetable soup, typically made with chicken for added flavor. It often includes grains or legumes such as orzo, vermicelli, freekeh, lentils, fava beans, or peas, and is valued for its light, nourishing quality.
- Mahshi encompasses a range of stuffed vegetables including peppers, eggplants, courgettes, tomatoes, and onions. Unlike other Arabic countries where stuffed cabbage and grape leaves are considered types of mahshi, Libyans distinctly categorize these as Abrak.
- Merga, a chicken broth typically served alongside lamb or mutton dishes.

== Sauces ==
Sauces are essential components of the cuisine, often combining aromatic spices and herbs to complement staple dishes. Olive oil forms the base of many sauces, which typically include spices such as cumin, coriander, turmeric, and fenugreek. A common seasoning blend known as tabil, made from ground chili, garlic, coriander, and caraway, is widely used both as a marinade and a condiment. The standard tomato-based sauce, referred to as tabikha or salsa, is a fundamental component of many traditional meals. It is usually made with tomato paste or fresh tomatoes, sautéed onions, and olive oil, and is often seasoned with paprika, chili powder, turmeric, fenugreek, and occasionally cinnamon. In coastal areas, a cumin-based blend known as kammun hout is frequently added to seafood dishes. This sauce forms the base for a wide variety of Libyan stews, braised dishes, pasta, and stuffed vegetables. Other sauces, pastes, and marinades include:

- Harissa is hot chili sauce commonly eaten in Eastern Maghreb. Main ingredients include chili peppers, such as the typical and local Baklouti pepper imported from Al-Andalus, or bird's eye chili and serrano peppers, and spices such as garlic paste, coriander, red chili powder, caraway and olive oil.
- Tabikhat bessal (طبيخة البصل), also known as chermoulet el-hout (شرمولة الحوت), is a savory onion-based relish used in Libya to marinate or serve over fried fish and seafood.
- Pilpelchuma, a chili-garlic paste resembling a hot sauce, traditionally originating from the Libyan Jewish community.
- Tershi, a spicy, traditional Jewish appetizer or dip originating from Tripoli, Libya.
- Toum is a garlic sauce made from garlic, lemon juice, and olive oil, similar to aioli.

== Breads ==
Tannour bread is the most common and popular type of bread. It is baked in a traditional clay oven heated by dry olive wood. Alongside tannour, shorter, thinner breads resembling small baguettes, eish fino, or ficelles are common and often referred to simply as khobz. These loaves are everyday staples frequently used for making sandwiches filled with tuna, sardines, cheese, jam, or chocolate spreads like Nutella. Other varieties include flatbread (mafrud), thin unleavened bread (raqaq), and pan-baked bread (taweh). Other types of bread in Libya include:

- Khobza Mahwara, made from refined wheat flour (semolina), sprinkled with sesame seeds, and brushed with saffron water.
- Khobz mallah (Arabic: خبز الملة), a famous traditional breads still widespread in desert and Bedouin areas of Arab countries, dating back to the early centuries AD. The bread is baked under the hot sand and is also known as Khobza Jamar. It is especially in Sebha and Sirte.

== Desserts ==
- Asida is a dish made of a cooked wheat flour lump of dough, sometimes with added butter, honey or rub.
- Ghreyba, butter cookies
- Makroudh, date-filled cookies
- Mhalbiya, type of rice pudding
- Asida
- Mathroda
- Drua - (Libyan salep made from millet)
- Mafruka
- Kunafa
- Sfenj
- Zalabiyeh
- Zumeeta
- Halwa Majouna
- Bakalawa
- Bsisa, barley pudding
- Basbousa
- Kaek is a type of biscuit that can be either sweet or savory. It is the most common biscuit served to guests alongside Libyan tea at various occasions, including social gatherings, eids, and funerals.
- Abamber is a traditional Libyan almond biscuit of Italian origin, made from almonds, sugar, and egg whites. It is a popular sweet served with tea or coffee and commonly enjoyed during special occasions.

== Beverages ==
- Libyan tea, the Libyan tea is a thick beverage served in a small glass, often accompanied by peanuts.
- Milk tea is also a widely enjoyed beverage in Libya, often served hot and sweetened. It is especially common during breakfasts or social gatherings, where it may be flavored with cardamom or infused with black tea for a richer taste.
- Arabic coffee
- Regular American/British coffee is available in Libya, and is known as "Nescafé" (a misnomer).
- Soft drinks and bottled water are also consumed.
- Juices such as lemonade, orange juice, and mango juice are among the most commonly consumed juices in Libya.
- The Maghrebi mint tea is also a popular drink.
- Qamar al-Din is a drink widely consumed by Libyans, especially during Ramadan. Made from dried apricot paste mixed with water and sugar.
- Karkadeh, a chilled hibiscus tea commonly consumed in Libya, especially in summer, known for its tart, refreshing taste.
- Lagbi, a beverage made from sap extracted from the stalks of certain palm trees.

All alcoholic drinks have been banned in Libya since 1969, in accordance with Sharia, the religious laws of Islam. However, illegally imported alcohol is available on the black market, alongside a homemade spirit called Bokha. Bokha is often consumed with soft drinks as mixers.

== See also ==
- Culture of Libya
- Arab culture
- Arab cuisine
- Berber cuisine
- Berber culture
- List of African cuisines
