= Kuwaiti cuisine =

Culinary traditions of Kuwait

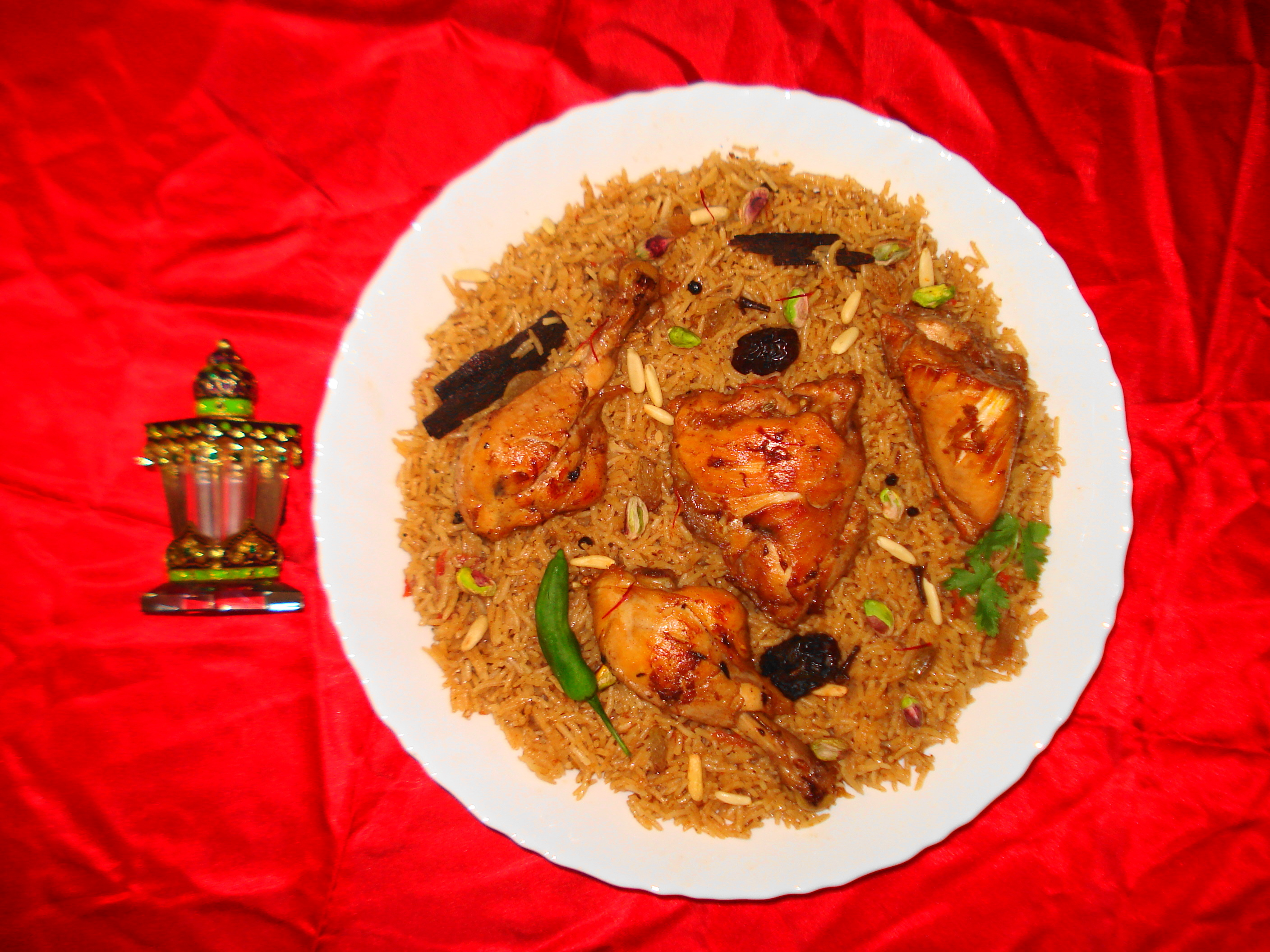
Machboos

Kuwaiti cuisine is an amalgamation of primarily Arabian and Iranian, with modern influences from Indian. Kuwaiti cuisine is part of the Eastern Arabian cuisine. A prominent dish in Kuwaiti cuisine is machboos, a rice-based dish usually prepared with basmati rice seasoned with spices, and chicken or mutton.

Seafood is a significant part of the Kuwaiti diet, especially fish. Mutabbaq samak is a national dish in Kuwait. Other local favourites are hamour (grouper), which is typically served grilled, fried, or with biryani rice because of its texture and taste; safi (rabbitfish); maid (mulletfish); and sobaity (sea bream).

Kuwait's traditional flatbread is called khubz. It is a large flatbread baked in a special oven and it is often topped with sesame seeds. Bread is often served with mahyawa fish sauce.

== Dishes ==
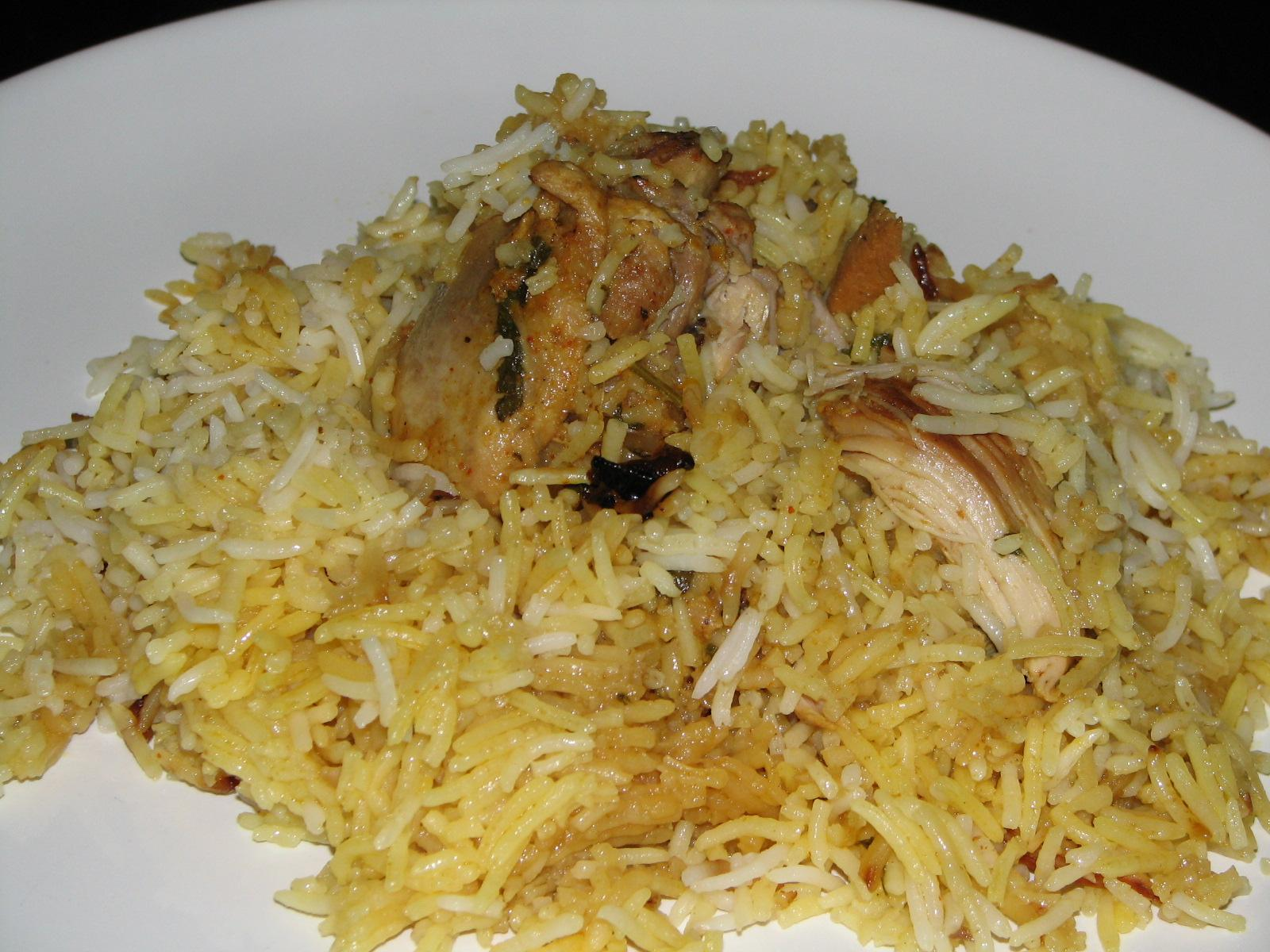
Biryani with chicken

- Biryani (Arabic: برياني) – a very common dish, which consists of heavily seasoned rice cooked with chicken or lamb. Originally from the Indian sub-continent.
- Gabout (Arabic: قبوط), – stuffed flour dumplings in a thick meat stew.
- Harees (Arabic: هريس) – wheat cooked with meat then mashed, usually topped with cinnamon sugar.
- Jireesh (Yireesh) (Arabic: جريش) – a mash of cooked spelt with chicken or lamb, tomatoes, and some spices.
- Machboos (Arabic: مجبوس) – a dish made with mutton, chicken, or fish accompanied over fragrant rice that has been cooked in chicken/mutton well-spiced broth.
- Mashkhool (Arabic: مشخول) – white rice and at the bottom of the pot, there are rings of onion with turmeric and black pepper. and sometimes potatoes and eggplants are also added at the bottom of the pot.
- Mashwi jeder (Arabic: مشوي جدر) – white rice with beef or chicken, onions, potatoes and spices all at the bottom of the pot and then flipped upside down on a plate.
- Maidem (Arabic: ميدم) – a white rice and on top of it ground fish mixed with spices.
- Marabyan (Arabic: مربين) – a rice cooked with either fresh or dry shrimp.
- Maglooba (Arabic: مقلوبة) – rice cooked with meat and potatoes and eggplant.
- Margoog (Arabic: مرقوق) – vegetable stew, usually containing squash and eggplant, cooked with thin pieces of rolled out dough.
- Mumawwash (Arabic: مموش) – rice cooked with green lentils and can be topped with dry shrimp.
- Muaddas (Arabic: معدس) – rice cooked with red lentils and can be topped with dry shrimp.
- Mutabbaq samak (Arabic: مطبق سمك) – fish served over rice. Rice is cooked in well-spiced fish stock.
- Quzi (Arabic: قوزي) – roasted lamb stuffed with rice, meat, eggs, and other ingredients.

== Sauces and soups ==
- Daqqus (Arabic: دقوس) – Type of tomato sauce served alongside rice
- Mabboj (Arabic: معبوج) – It is hot sauce, red or green pepper mixed with other ingredients.
- Mahyawa (Arabic: مهياوة) – a tangy fish sauce.
- Marrag (Arabic: مرق) – It is a type of broth with tomato paste and a variety of vegetables and spices.
- Lentil soup

== Desserts ==
- Asida (Arabic: عصيدة) – a dish made up of cooked wheat flour, with added butter or honey.
- Balaleet (Arabic: بلاليط) – sweet saffron noodles served with a savoury omelette on top.
- Bayth elgitta (Arabic: بيض القطا) – a fried cookie filled with a mixture of ground nuts and tossed in powdered sugar. It was named after the egg of the crowned sandgrouse (common to the area) due to its similar shape.
- Darabeel (Arabic: درابيل) – made from flour, eggs, milk and sugar formed into very thin rolled layers. Sometimes sugar, cardamom or cinnamon are added.
- Lugaimat (Arabic: لقيمات) – fried yeast dumplings topped with sugar syrup (sugar, saffron).
- Gers ogaily (Arabic: قرص عقيلي) – a traditional cake made with eggs, flour, sugar, cardamom, and saffron. Traditionally served with tea.
- Zalabia (Arabic: زلابية) – fried dough soaked in syrup (sugar, lemon, and saffron, it has a distinctive swirly shape.
- Ghraiba – Delicate cookies made of flour, butter, powdered sugar and cardamom. Usually served with Arabic coffee.
- Khabeesa – sweet dish made of flour and oil.
- Sab Alqafsha (Kuwaiti Arabic: صب القفشة) – similar to lugaimat but with additional saffron and cardamom syrup.
- Elba (Arabic: ألبة) – Kuwaiti milk pudding with saffron and cardamom.
- maghuta (Kuwaiti Arabic: ماغوطة)- It's a type of pudding that contains coconut shell powder Sago instead of starch made with saffron.

== Beverages ==
- Laban (Arabic: لبن) (buttermilk)
- Sharbat baithan
- Black tea served in delicate cups called istikana
- Arabic coffee
- Kuwaiti tea
- Dried lime tea
- Karak tea
- Different varieties of Arabic tea

== See also ==
- Culture of Kuwait
- Arab cuisine
- Middle Eastern cuisine

== Bibliography ==
- Al-Hamad, Sarah, 2015, Cardamom and Lime: Tastes of the Arabian Gulf , Fox Chapel Publishing, ISBN 978-1-5048-0024-2
- DiPiazza, Francesca Davis, 2006 Kuwait in Pictures, Twenty-First Century Books, p. 56- 57, ISBN 0-8225-6589-7
- Riolo, Amy, 2007, Arabian Delights: Recipes & Princely Entertaining Ideas from the Arabian Peninsula, Capital Books, p. 23- 24, ISBN 1-933102-55-1
