= Pilpelchuma =

Israeli chilli-garlic paste

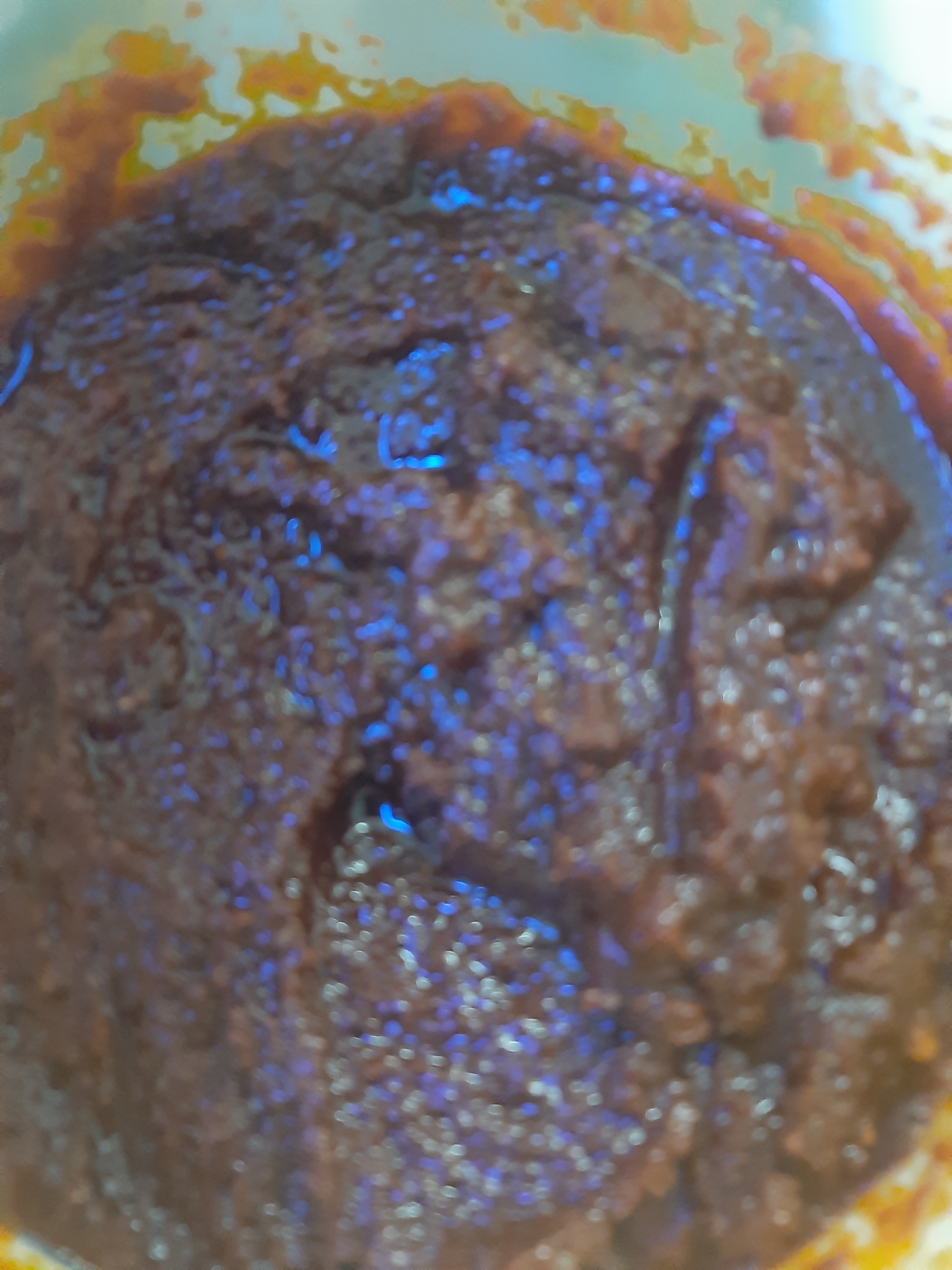
- Alternative names: Pilpelshuma, Filfelchuma, Filfel chuma
- Course: Chili garlic paste
- Place of origin: Libya
- Created by: Libyan Jews
- Main ingredients: Dried and steamed red peppers, garlic, olive oil, lemon juice and spices, salt

Pilpelchuma (Hebrew: פלפלצ'ומה), also spelled pilpelshuma (lit: "pepper garlic"), is a chilli-garlic paste similar to a hot sauce originating from the Libyan Jews and commonly used in Israeli cuisine.

== Overview ==
Pilpelchuma traditionally has been the main condiment in Libyan Jewish cuisine. Pilpelchuma made its way into Israeli cuisine in the mid-20th century with the community's forced migration to Israel. Pilpelchuma has a consistency similar to tomato paste and is available in Israel in packaged form typically in a tube or jar. Pilpelchuma is also commonly made at home. The two main ingredients of pilpelchuma are dried sweet and hot peppers that have been steamed and garlic. Other ingredients are olive oil, ground cumin and caraway seeds, lemon juice and kosher salt.

== Uses and popularity ==
Pilpelchuma is used as a condiment and as an ingredient in dishes such as salads, meat, fish, legumes and rice dishes. Today in Israel it is a popular condiment used in falafel sandwiches, shawarma, chicken schnitzel, sabich, and to top hummus. It is especially popular in Jerusalem, where it is used in the local variety of shakshuka. This popularity is due to the area's large Libyan Jewish community.

In recent years pilpelchuma has become popular in the West and is used as a condiment in such dishes as potato salad.

== See also ==
- Amba
- Sambal
- Sriracha
- Sephardi Jewish cuisine
