= Libyan tea =

Traditional beverage

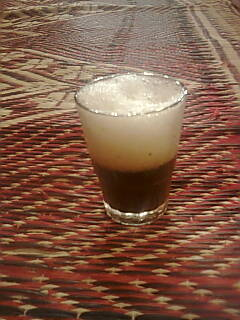
Libyan green tea

Libyan tea is a strong beverage, prepared with traditional set of stainless steel utensils and served in a small glass cups. It is a variant of Maghrebi tea and similar to it in prepared by boiling loose tea leaves but differ in presentation. Libyan tea is usually served in three courses with the last round including boiled skinless peanuts or almonds. Mint or basil are sometimes added as a flavor. Initially sugarless beverage is prepared to allow for a foam formation. Each cup when finally presented would have a layer of yellowish foam on top of the tea.

The tea is traditionally served as part of a ceremonial presentation known as Shahi al-Alla. This ritual involves the use of a distinctive set of stainless steel utensils, including a teapot, a kettle, serving trays, glass cups, and containers for sugar. Historically, the set also included an incense burner, reflecting the ceremony's role as a formal expression of hospitality.

According to one interpretation, the characteristic foam that forms on the surface of Libyan tea may have originated as a practical adaptation to desert conditions. It has been suggested that the foam served as a protective layer, helping to trap sand or dust particles and prevent them from entering the liquid. Over time, this functional feature became an established and valued element of the tea's traditional preparation and presentation.

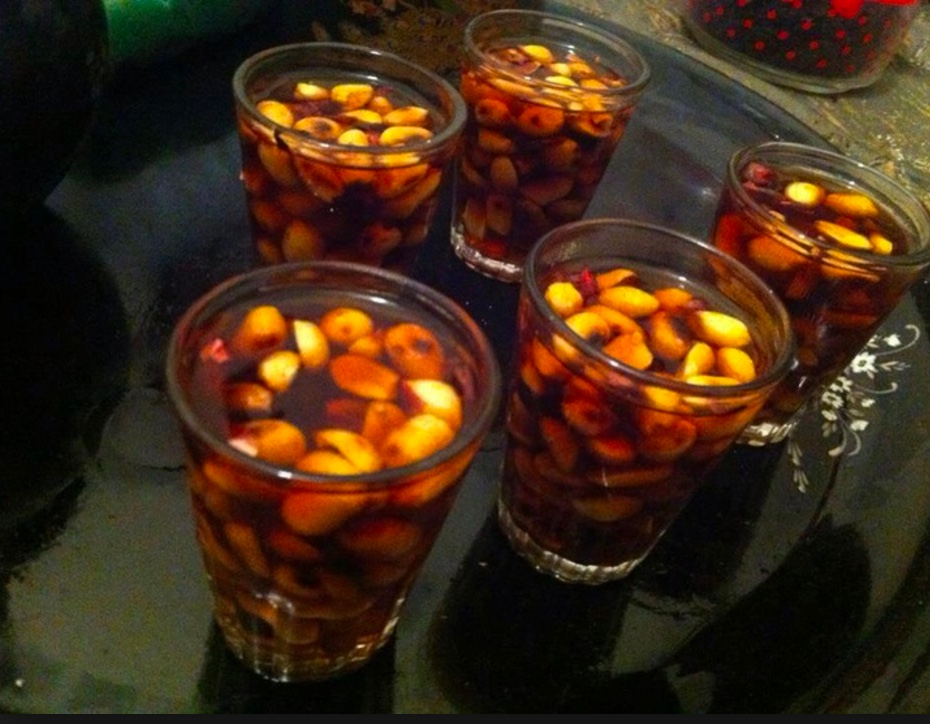
Libyan tea with peanuts

== See also ==
- Libyan cuisine
- Arabic tea
- Maghrebi mint tea
- Tea culture
