= Bazin (bread) =

Cooked dough and stew in Libyan cuisine

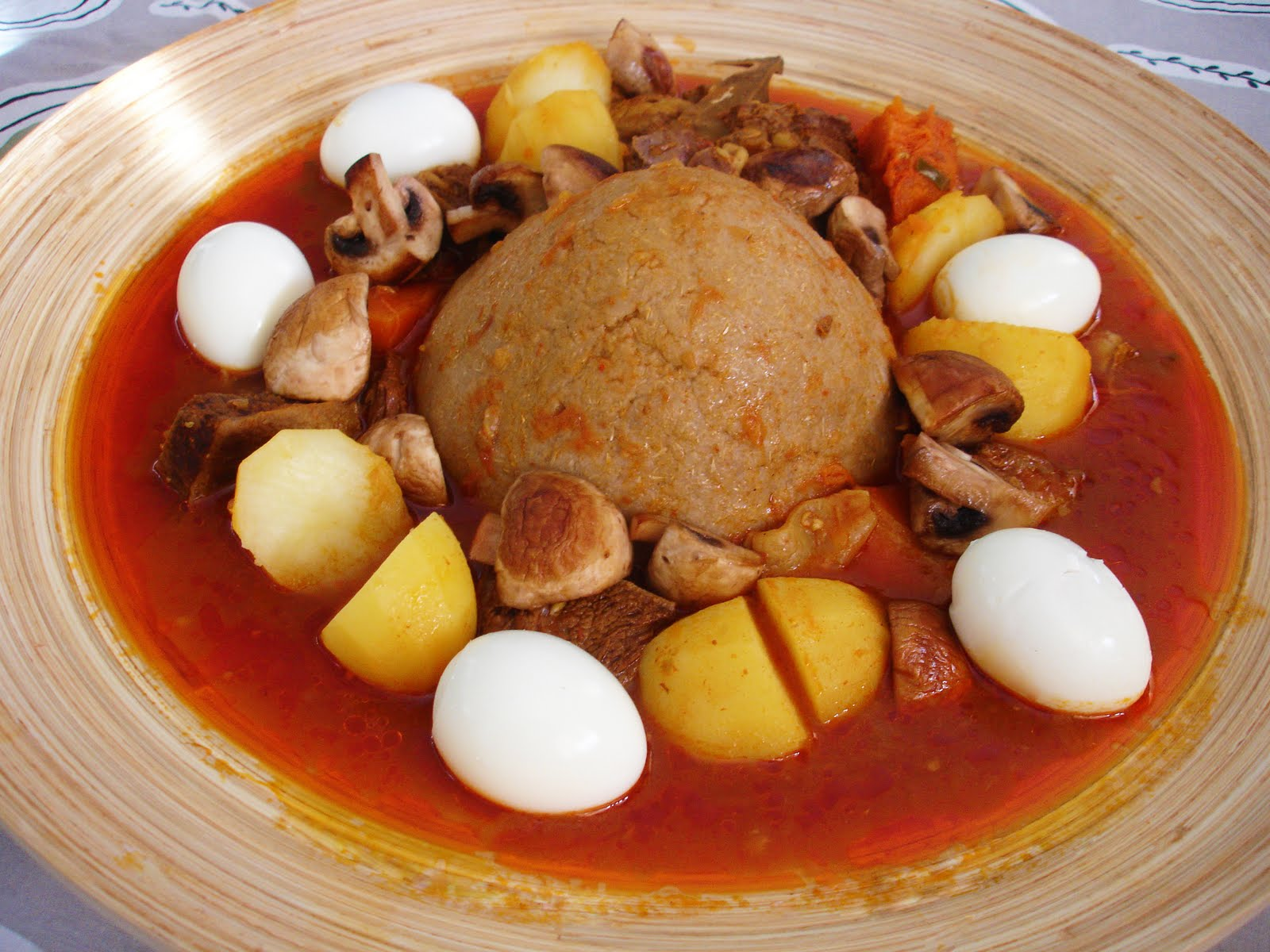
- Bazin (center) served with a stew and whole hard-boiled eggs.
- Alternative names: Bazeen
- Place of origin: Libya
- Associated cuisine: Libyan cuisine
- Main ingredients: wheat or barley, water and salt

Bazin (Arabic: البازين, pronounced [baːˈziːn]) alternatively recognized as Bazeen, Bézine or Bazine is an unleavened bread in the cuisine of Libya prepared with barley, water and salt. Bazin is prepared by boiling barley flour or wheat flour in water and then beating it to create a dough using a magraf, which is a unique stick designed for this purpose. The dough may then be placed in a pan and allowed time to harden, after which it is baked or steamed. (Note: "... and bazin, made of steamed wheat or barley and a sauce of stewed vegetables and meat.") The salt contributes to the hardness of the bazin. Bazin may have a paste-like and hardened texture. (Note: "Bazin is a Libyan speciality - hard, paste-like food made of water, salt and barley and is really not recommended except to the gastronomically hardy.") It may also be prepared using whole wheat flour, olive oil, honey and/or pepper as ingredients.

Bazin in Libya is typically served with a tomato sauce, eggs, potatoes and mutton or camel . This preparation method involves shaping the dough into the shape of a dome, after which it may be served with a tomato-based sauce or meat-and-potato stew poured atop or around it and garnished with hard-boiled eggs. A raw egg may also be placed in the hot soup. Bazin may also be accompanied with a cooked pumpkin and tomato sauce mixture. (Note: "Pumpkins (Cucurbita pepo) grown in Libya are widely utilized as cooked vegetable served with tomato sauce with such national starchy dishes as 'KosKos' and 'Bazin'.")

When consumed, bazin may be "crumpled and eaten with the fingers." It is typically eaten using the right hand, and may be consumed communally. Bazin has been described as a traditional dish and as a national dish of Libya.

== Sauce ==
Bazin sauce may be prepared by frying mutton (preferably shoulder or leg) with chopped onions, turmeric, salt, chilli powder, helba (fenugreek), sweet paprika, black pepper and tomato paste. Broad beans, lentils and potatoes may also be added. The sauce, eggs, potatoes and meat are arranged around the dough dome. The dish is typically served with lemon and fresh or pickled (imsaiyar) chillies.

== History ==
The old way of making bazin is to form the dough into palm-size cakes and cook in water in a special copper pot called a qidir. The barley cakes, having become solid, are then broken up in the pot with a large, flat, wooden ladle and mixed to form one large piece. Nowadays, a blender is often used, or the dough is cooked immediately in water like a pudding.

== See also ==
- Asida
- Fufu
- List of African dishes
- List of Middle Eastern dishes
- List of breads
