= Kuwaiti tea =

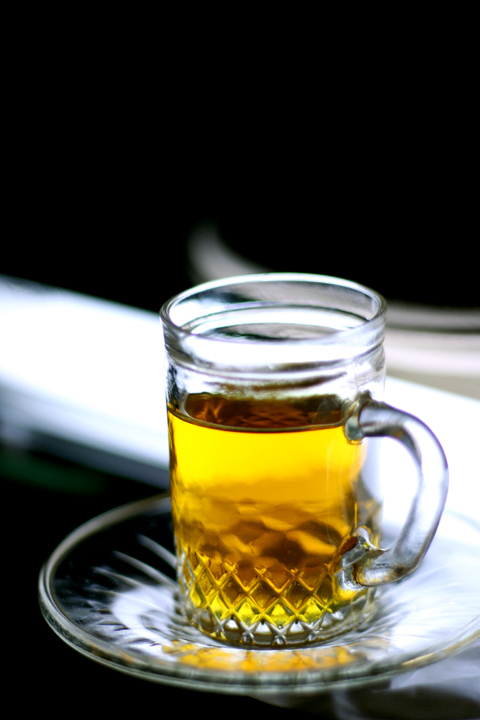
A glass of cinnamon tea

Kuwaiti tea (Arabic: الشاي الكويتي; "Shay al Kuwaiti") refers to several varieties of tea traditionally served in that country.

One is a sweet cinnamon tea. This tea is served with breakfast or during the traditional tea ceremony. The tea is created by putting water in a boiler together with cinnamon sticks and sugar. When the tea is ready, it is served with nuts, dried fruit, cookies or dates.

Another type of Kuwaiti tea is saffron and cardamom tea. This tea is usually served after lunch. It is a Kuwaiti tradition to offer a guest to a house a cup of tea or Arabic coffee.

== See also ==
- Kuwaiti cuisine
- Arabic tea
