= Mutabbaq samak =

Rice-based dish

Mutabbaq Samak (also mutabbak, or im'tabbag simach (Arabic مطبق سمك)) a rice-based dish popular in the Arab states of the Persian Gulf and in some southern cities in Iraq. It is basically spiced fried fish, usually Stromateus and caramelized onions served over rice that is cooked in well-spiced fish stock. Fish can be whole fish or fish filet. It is considered a national dish in Iraq and Kuwait where the dish is pronounced in both of their colloquial dialects as "im'tabbag simach". In Arabia, raisins, cardamom and tomato broth are added too.

== History ==
The word "mutabbaq" (Arabic: مطبق) in Arabic means "layered" while "samak" (Arabic: سمك) in Arabic means "fish". This is indicative of the way this dish was prepared historically, in which layers of fish, rice and bread were added in a pot which is flipped upside down when ready to be served. Today, the recipe became so much simpler that it is common to find any fried fish over rice is called Mutabbaq Samak. Sometimes the fried fish with fish stock is added in a rice cooker. Mutabbaq Samak is sometimes garnished with nuts and chopped parsley and served with Arab salad. It is often considered comfort food.

== See also ==
- Murtabaq, a closely named dish which is less known in the Arab states of the Persian Gulf
- Arab cuisine
- Mesopotamian cuisine
- Kuwaiti cuisine
- Saudi Arabian cuisine
- List of casserole dishes
- List of rice dishes
