= Arabic tea =

Hot drinks popular throughout the Arab world

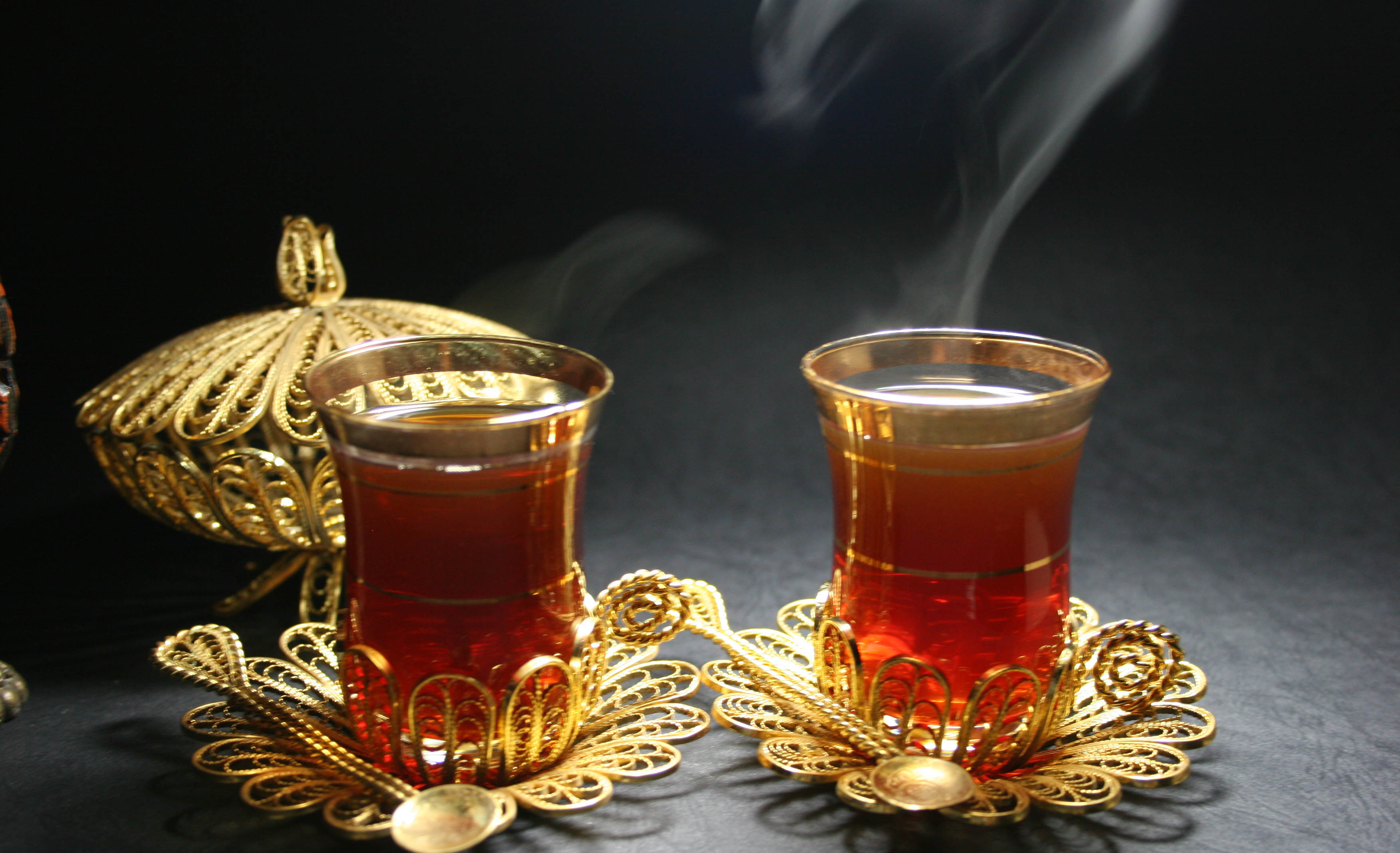
- Two glasses of Arabic tea
- Alternative names: šāy ʿarabiyy
- Type: Tea
- Course: Drink
- Place of origin: Arab world
- Region or state: Arab World
- Associated cuisine: Arab cuisine
- Serving temperature: Hot

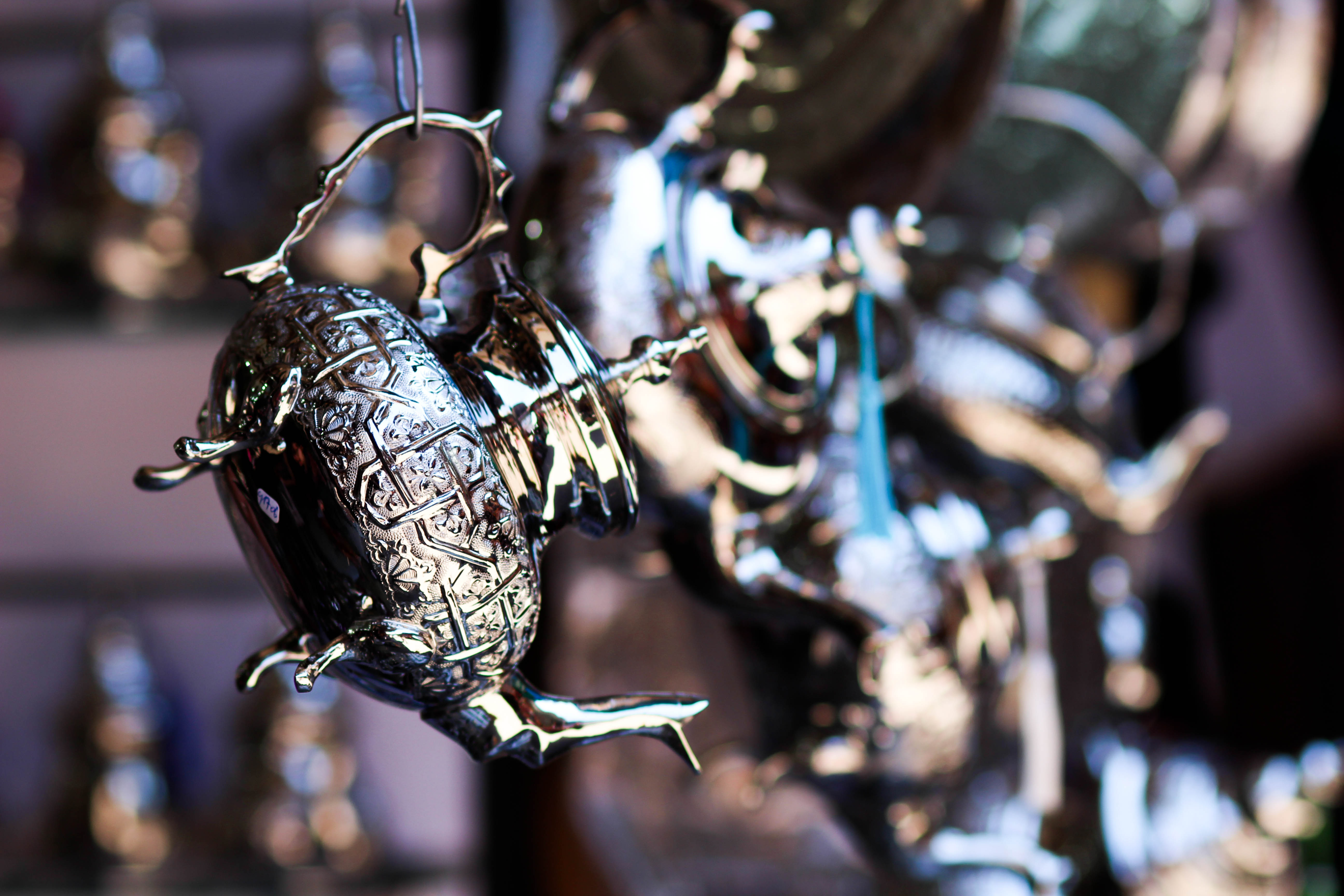
Arabic teapot in Morocco

Arabic tea (Arabic: شَايْ عَرَبي, romanized: šhāy ʿarabiyy, pronounced shay [ʃæiː]) is a variety of hot teas popular throughout the Arab world. It is commonly served to guests and business partners at meetings and social events, and has been drunk by Arab people for centuries. Unlike Iranian and Turkish tea, Arabic tea is not served as black tea but rather flavored with spices like anise or cinnamon, or fresh herbs like spearmint.

== History ==
Tea was first cultivated in ancient China during the Shang Dynasty (1766–1050 BC). Preferred for its medicinal properties, tea made its way to the Middle East as soon as Arab merchants started travelling the Silk Road who brought tea back to their own nations. Tea developed from a basic beverage to an essential part of the regional way of life as it became more popular across the Middle East.

== Culture ==
Tea is an important drink in the Arab world and is usually served with breakfast, after lunch, and with dinner. For Arabs, tea denotes hospitality, and is typically served to guests. Tea owes its popularity to its social nature; it is an important aspect of hospitality and business etiquette in Arab culture. Rejecting a cup of tea may sometimes be considered rude.

== Varieties ==
There are many different types of Arabic tea:

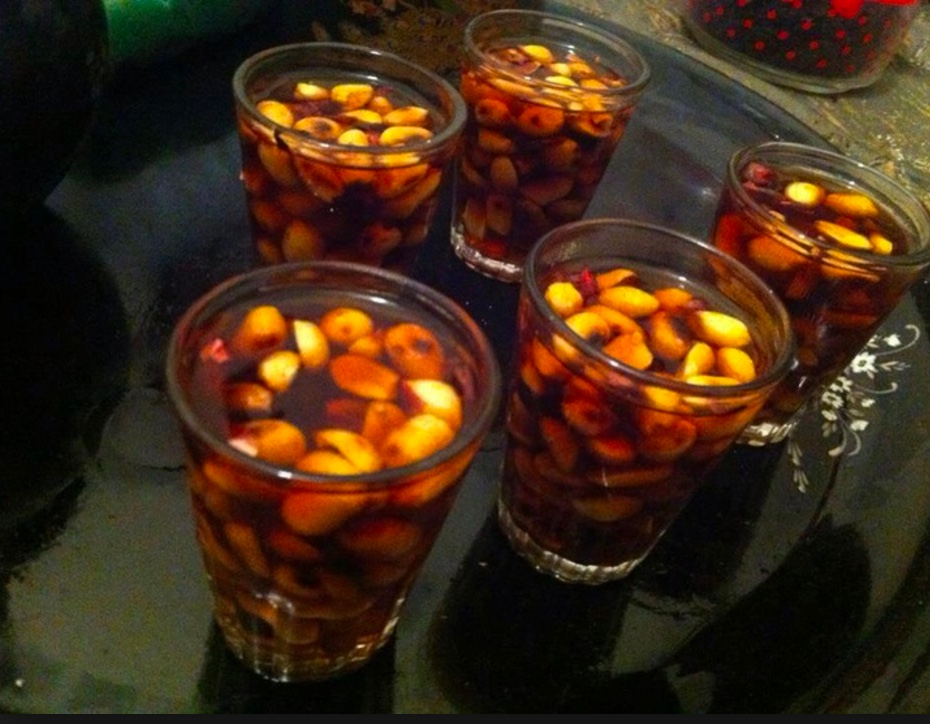
Arabic tea in Libya with peanuts

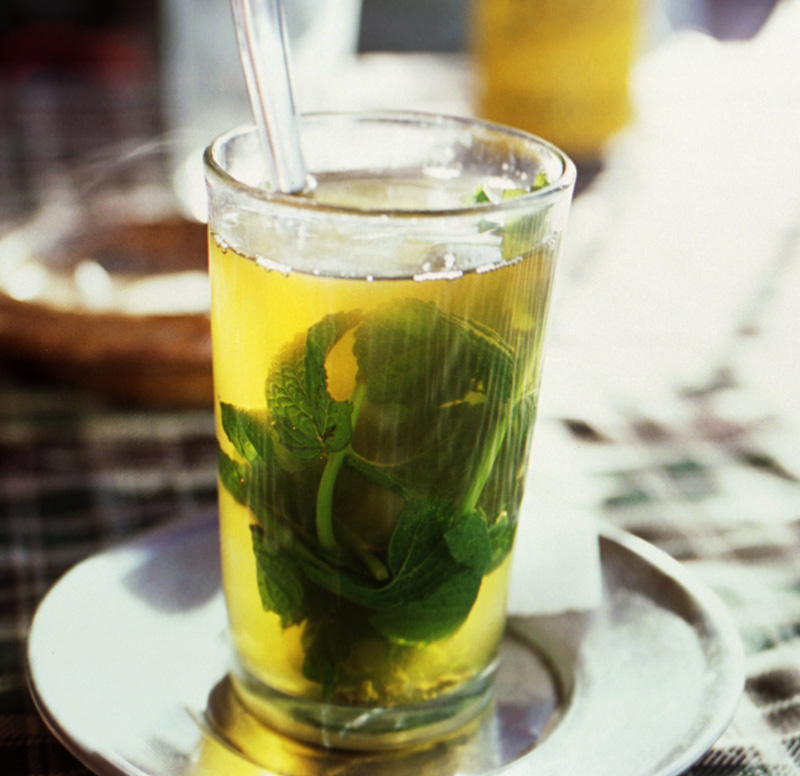
Maghrebi mint tea in Morocco

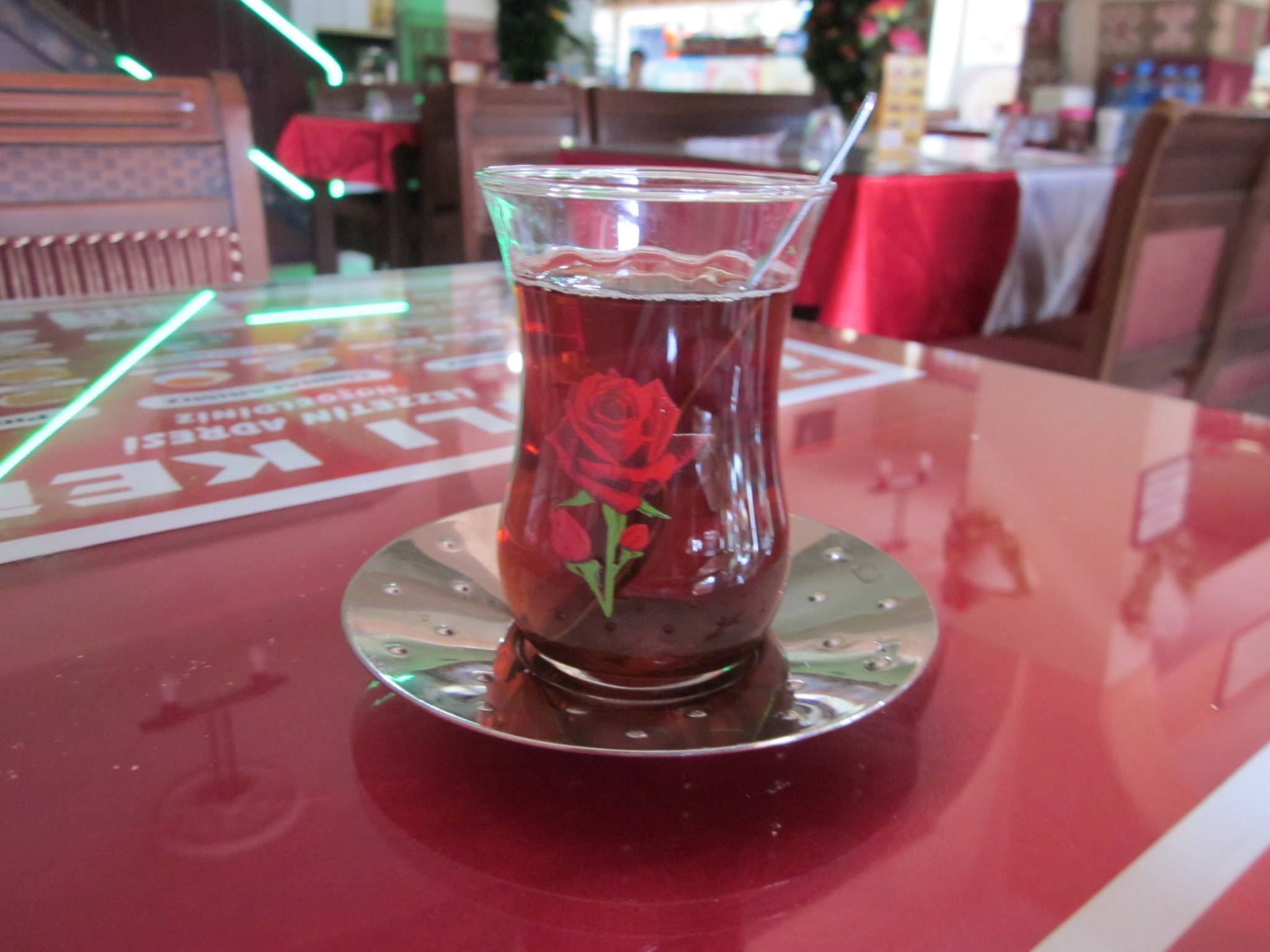
Black tea in Tunisia

- Sage (Arabic: مريمية, romanized: maramia) tea is typically served after a meal to aid in digestion and eliminate gas or heartburn.
- Anise (Arabic: يانسون, romanized: yānsūn) tea has been well known for hundreds of years.
- Thyme (Arabic: زعتر, romanized: zaʿtar) tea is rich in antioxidants.
- Cardamom (Arabic: هال, romanized: hāl) tea is very common in the Arab world, and is known for its strong aroma. It is sometimes mixed with coffee, and is said to help digestion and increase saliva flow. It is drunk before meals to prepare digestive enzymes. Although one of the most expensive spices in the world, cardamom is still largely harvested by hand for many Arab customers.
- Maghrebi mint tea (at-tāy): (Arabic: الشاي, romanized: aš-šāy; Maghrebi Arabic: التاي at-tāy) is a green tea prepared with spearmint leaves and sugar, traditional to the Maghreb region (the northwest African countries of Morocco, Algeria, Tunisia, Libya, and Mauritania).
- Mint tea (Arabic: شاي بالنعناع, romanized: šāy bi-l-naʿnāʿ) is especially popular in parts of the Arab world. It is commonly used to get over colds, a sore throat, sinus congestion, and stomach ulcers.
- Black tea (Arabic: شاي أحمر, romanized: šāy ʾaḥmar, lit. 'red tea') is the most common.
- Cinnamon tea or Kuwaiti tea (Arabic: شاي بالقرفة, romanized: šāy bi-l-qirfah) is created by putting water in a boiler together with cinnamon sticks and sugar.
- Bedouin tea (شاي بدوي) is prepared by the nomadic bedouins on an open fire and typically includes a mix of dried herbs, like thyme or sage. Spices are also common in bedouin tea, like cardamom or cinnamon.

=== Herbal tea ===
- Hibiscus (Arabic: كركديه, romanized: karkadayya) tea is drunk hot in the winter and cold in the summer.
- Dried lime tea (Arabic: شاي لومي, romanized: šāy lūmiyy) also known as chai noomi basra, noomi basra tea or loomi tea, is a type of herbal tea made from dried limes that is traditional to Iraq, Kuwait, Oman and United Arab Emirates.
- Chamomile (Arabic: بابونج, romanized: bābūnaj) tea is made by brewing dried chamomile flowers for medicinal use.
- Qurniyya (قرنية, Micromeria fruticosa) medicinal tea, made to treat a variety of ailments.

== Serving ==
Tea in the Arab world is usually a strong dark mix, similar to the so-called "breakfast tea" served in other parts of the world. Often brewed with sugar and served in long glasses, it can also be made with mint or cardamom, or with a dash of milk. In Yemen, black tea is brewed in water and milk.

== See also ==
- Arab culture
- Arab cuisine
- Arabic coffee
- Libyan tea
- Shahi haleeb
- Tea culture
- Turkish tea
