= Flat bean =

Variety of legume

'Flat bean'
- Species: Phaseolus vulgaris
- Marketing names: 'Romano bean', 'Helda beans', 'Gavar fhali'
- Origin: Italy

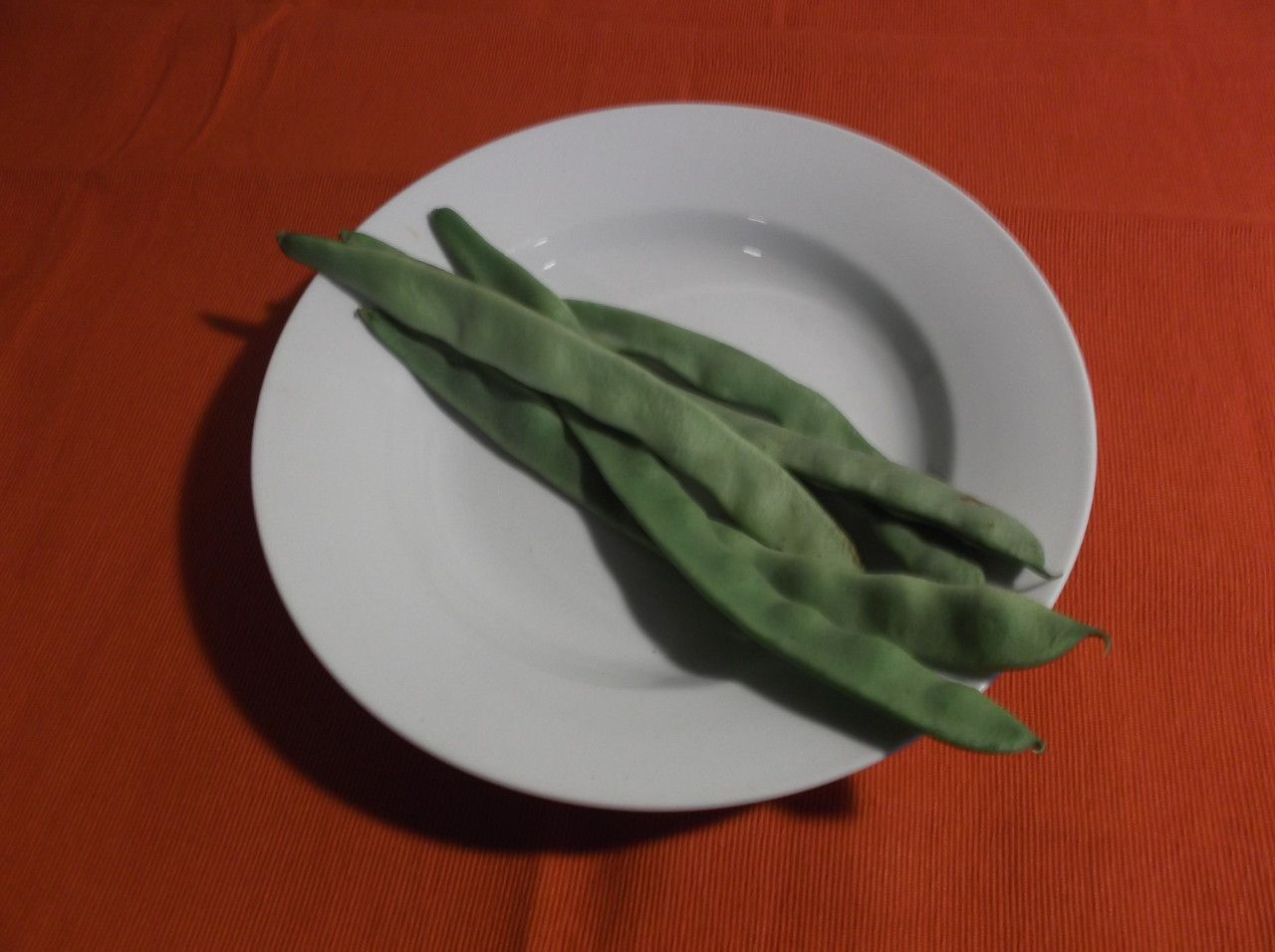
Raw flat beans

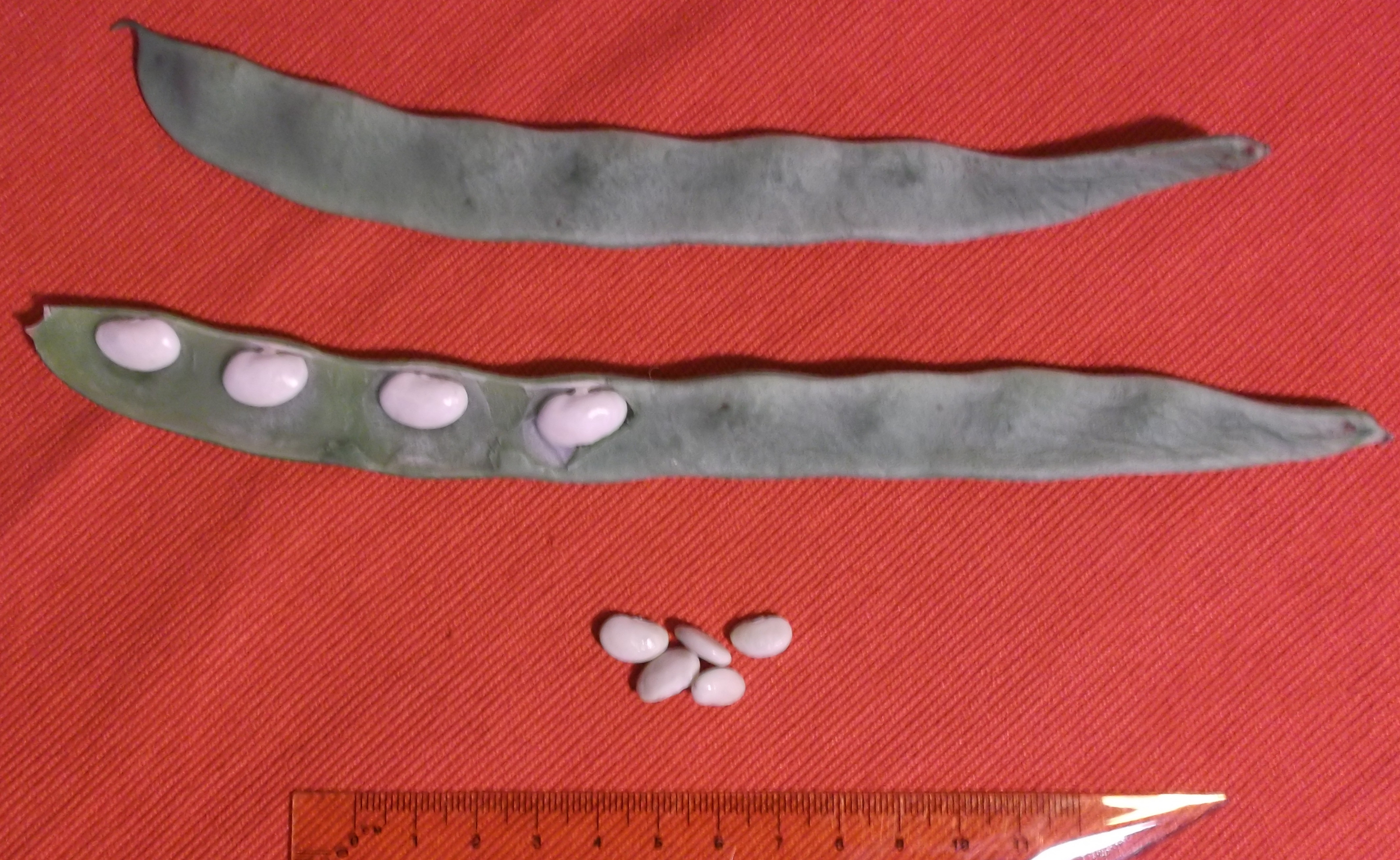
Raw flat beans showing the seeds

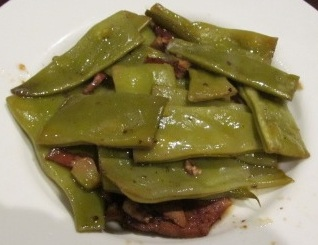
Cooked flat beans with bacon

Flat beans, also known as helda beans, romano beans (not to be confused with the borlotti bean) and "sem fhali" in some Indian states, are a variety of Phaseolus vulgaris, known as runner bean (not to be confused with Phaseolus coccineus) with edible pods that have a characteristic wide and flat shape. Flat beans are normally cooked, and served as the whole pods, the same way as other green beans. Like many other types of bean (see broad bean for example) they can also be dehusked or shelled, and the whitish seeds dried and stored, but there is no incentive to grow them for this purpose as higher-yielding bean varieties are available.

Modern flat bean varieties picked while young are stringless. Older varieties, and beans allowed to ripen on the vine, may contain tough strings.
