= Usban =

North African sausage

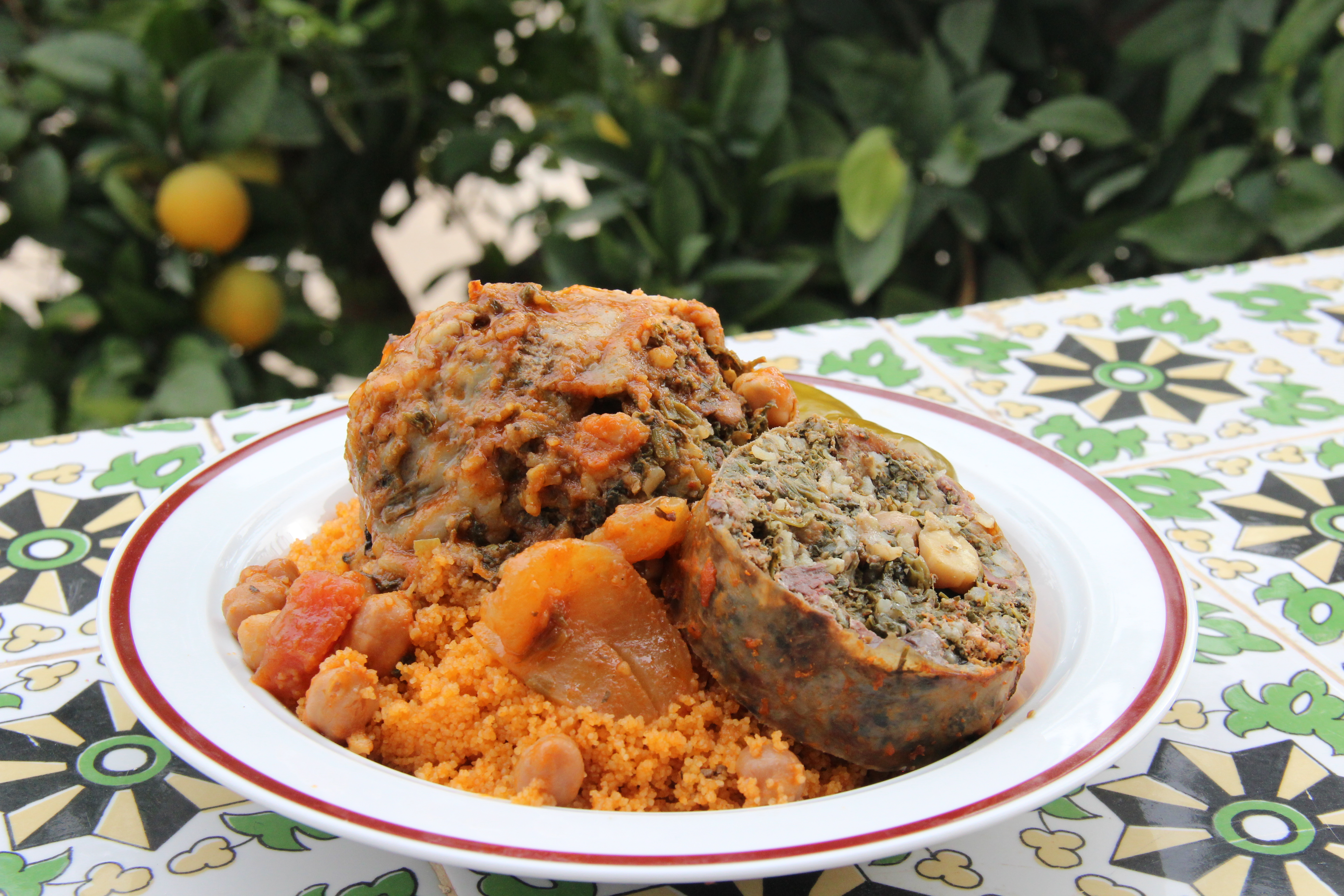
- Couscous with usban
- Place of origin: Tunisia, Libya, Algeria
- Associated cuisine: North African cuisine
- Main ingredients: rice, herbs, lamb, chopped liver and heart

Usban (or osban) (Arabic: عصبان, pronounced [ʕusˤbɑːn]) is a traditional kind of sausage in Tunisia and Libya stuffed with a mixture of rice, herbs, lamb, chopped liver and heart. This dish is usually served alongside the main meal of rice or couscous, often on special occasions.

Several varieties of usban exist, and the herbs and spices used can vary but typically include cayenne pepper, black pepper, turmeric and cinnamon, as well as dried mint, parsley and dill. This is added to spring onion, tomato, vegetable oil and rice. The mixture is stuffed into sheep intestines or commercial sausage casings and then tied off at the ends using thread. The sausages cook for an hour in a pot and are then browned in a frying pan or oven.

== Gallery ==
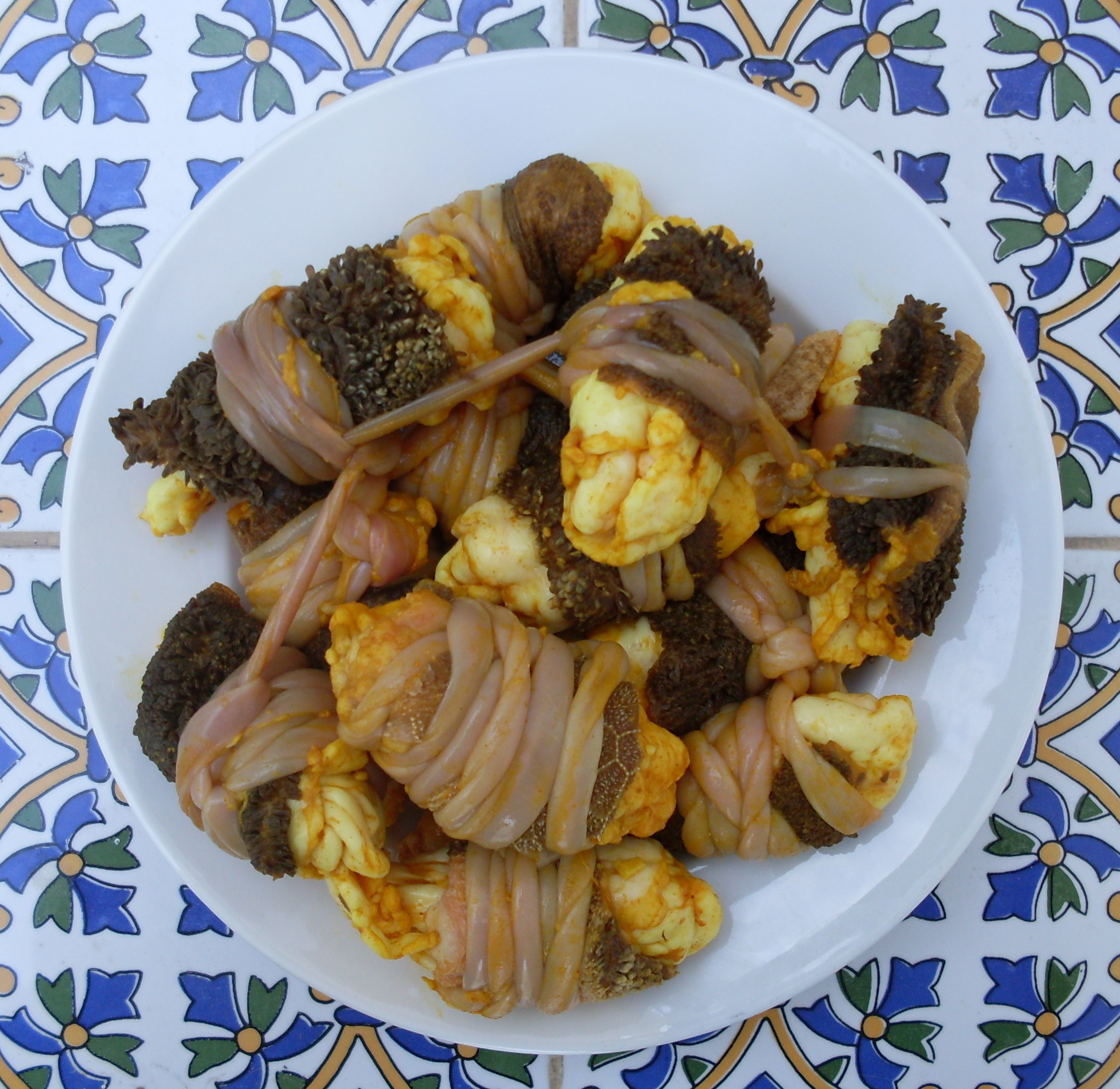
Usban in Djerba

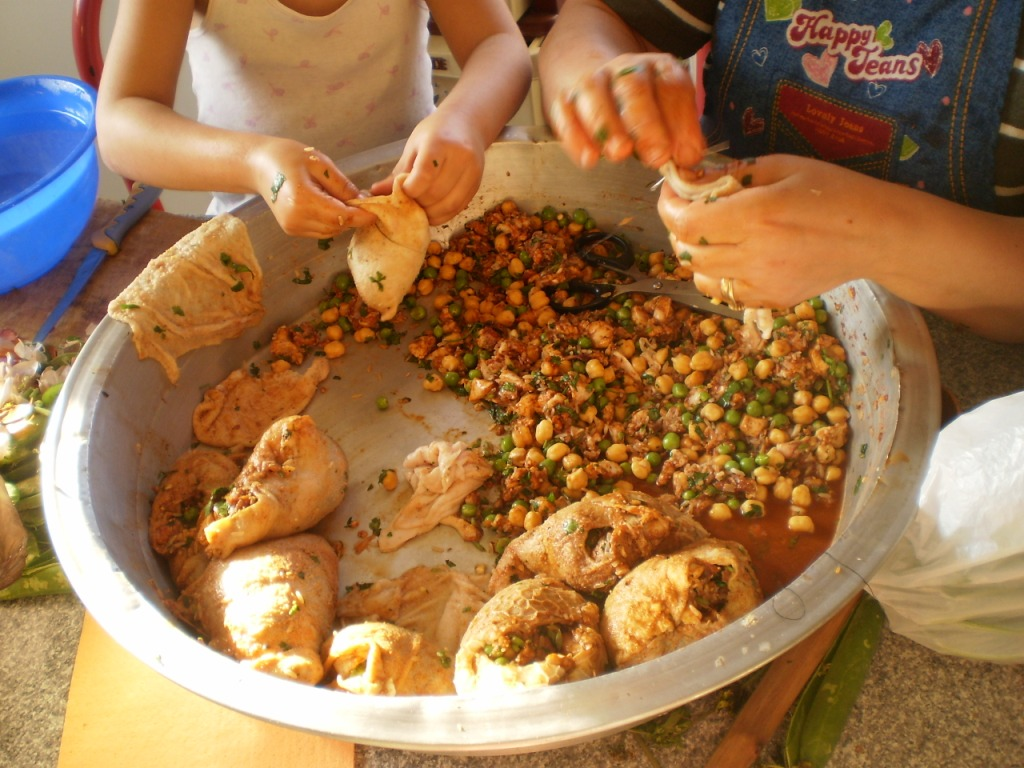
Usban preparation in Blida, Algeria

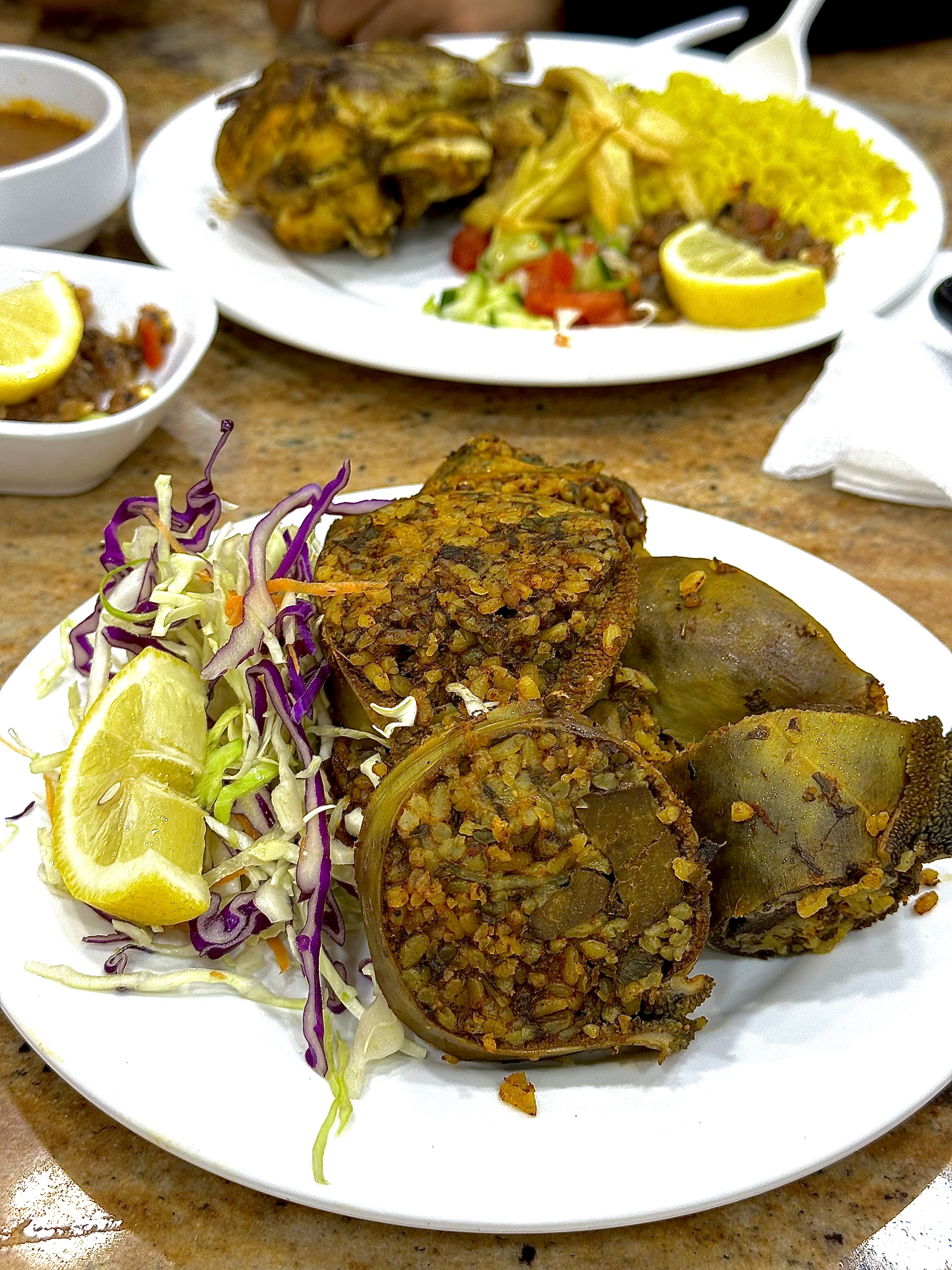
Usban from Libya

== See also ==
- List of Middle Eastern dishes
- List of African dishes
- List of stuffed dishes
