= Stuffed cookie =

Type of cookie

Stuffed Cookies
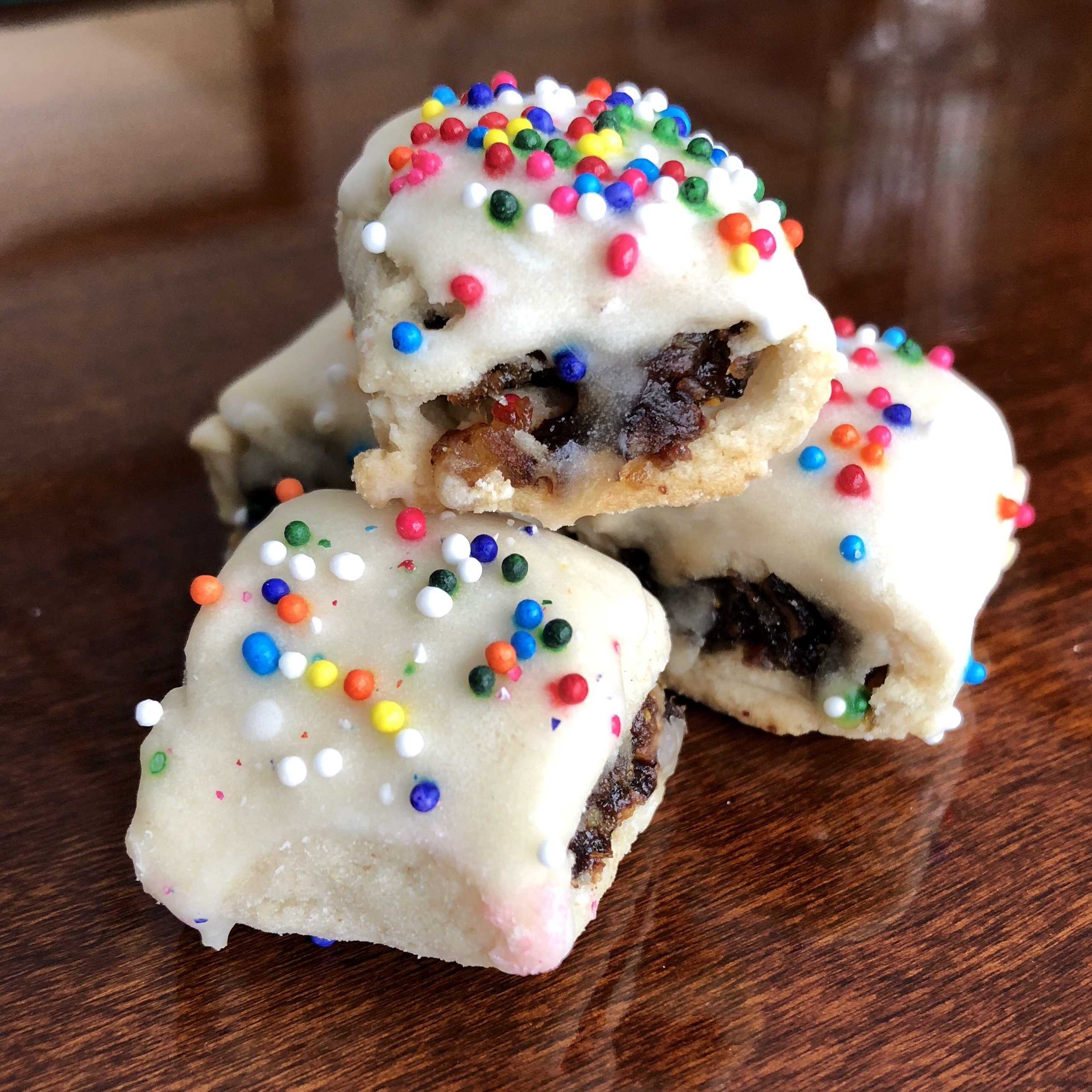
- Cuccidatti
- Alternative names: Stuffed Biscuit
- Course: Snack, dessert
- Place of origin: Persia, 7th century AD
- Serving temperature: Often room temperature, although they may be served when still warm from the oven

A stuffed cookie, also known as a stuffed biscuit, is a type of cookie. Many types of fillings are used, such as nutella, caramel, peanut butter.

== List of stuffed cookies/biscuits ==
- Nutella Stuffed Cookies
- Nutella stuffed chocolate cookies
- Nutella stuffed chocolate chip cookies
- Red velvet nutella stuffed cookies
- Nutella stuffed oatmeal hazelnut chocolate chip cookies
- Dark chocolate chocolate chip nutella stuffed chocolate cookies
- Caramel stuffed chocolate chip cookies
- Biscoff stuffed cookies
- Caramel stuffed apple cider cookies

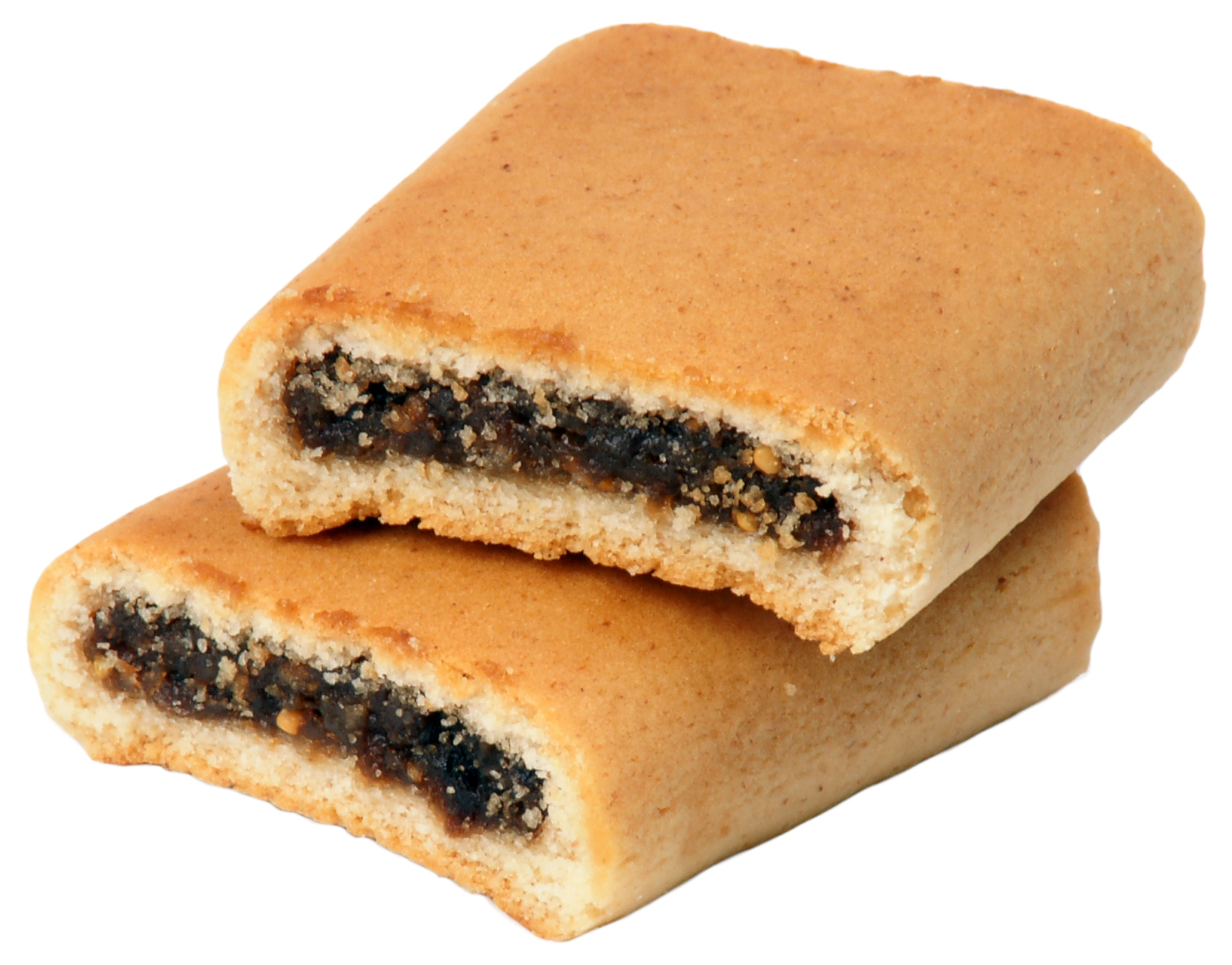
Fig Newtons

- Apple stuffed cookies
- Chocolate stuffed cookies
- Cheesecake stuffed cookies
- Custard-stuffed cookies
- Orange stuffed cookies
- Date stuffed cookies
- Lemon stuffed cookies
- Cherry stuffed cookies
- Fig stuffed cookies
- Fig and walnut stuffed cookies
- Coconut stuffed cookies
- Apricot stuffed cookies
- Quince stuffed cookies
- Almond stuffed cookies
- Pistachio-stuffed cookies
- Hazelnut stuffed cookies
- Walnut stuffed cookies
- Peanut-stuffed cookies
- Poppy-stuffed cookies
- White chocolate stuffed cookies
- White chocolate stuffed cocoa cookies
- Raspberry stuffed cookies
- Murabbalı mecidiye

== See also ==
- Cuccidati
- Fig roll
- List of cookies
