= Murabbalı mecidiye =

Turkish dessert

- Type: Kurabiye
- Place of origin: Turkey
- Main ingredients: Murabba, flour, baking soda, salt, butter, granulated sugar, powdered sugar, vanilla extract
- Variations: Apricot Kolaches

Murabbalı mecidiye (English: Apricot Murabba Stuffed Cookies) is a kurabiye from the Ottoman cuisine filled with apricot murabba.

== See also ==
- Kolach
- Sweet roll
- Fig roll
- Cinnamon roll
