= Köylü pastası =

Cake from Turkish cuisine

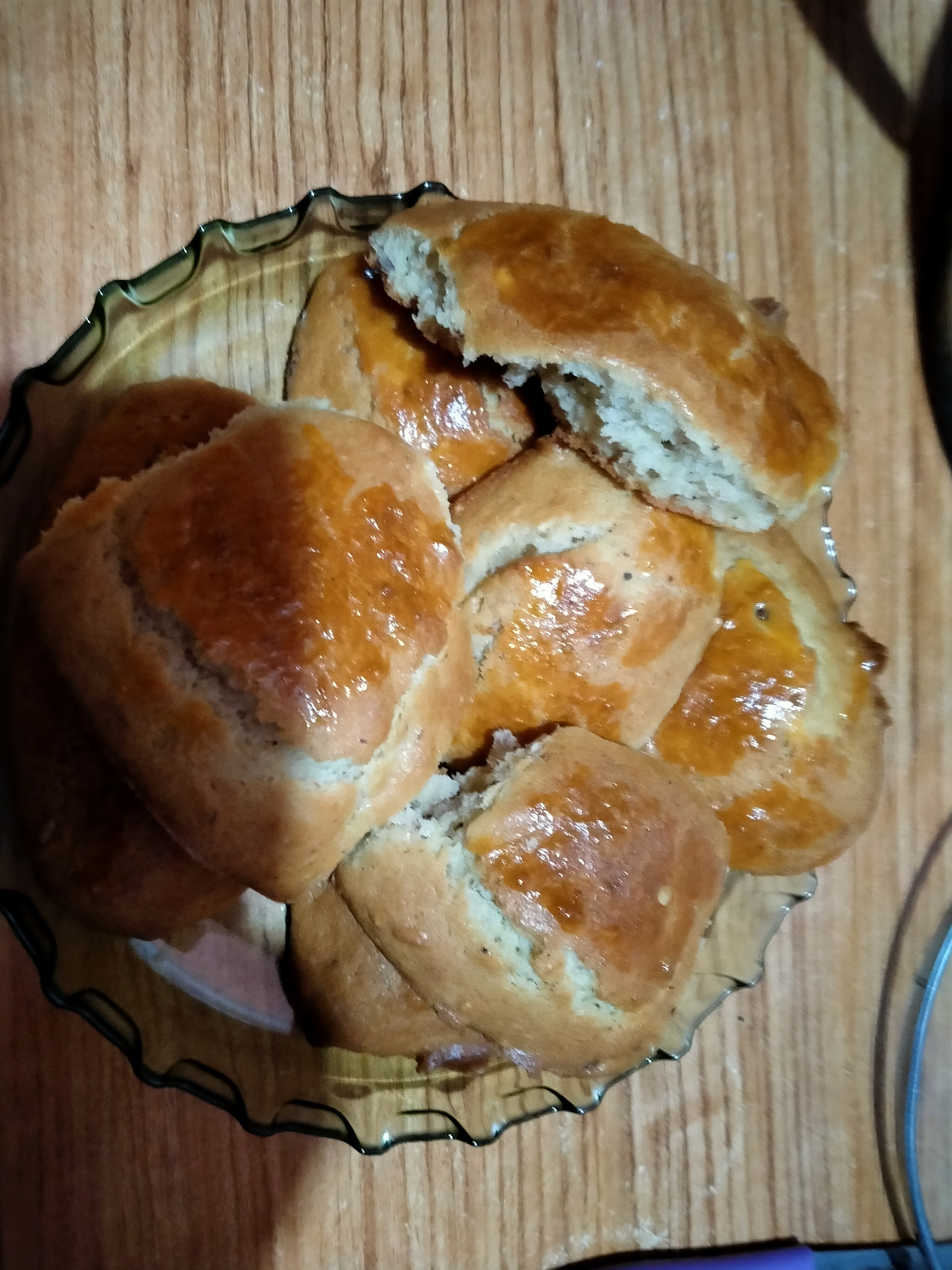
- Type: Kurabiye or cake
- Place of origin: Turkey
- Region or state: Eastern Anatolia region
- Main ingredients: flour, baking soda, salt, butter,sugar, egg, yogurt

Köylü pastası ("peasant's cake") is a kurabiye or cake from Turkish cuisine. Köylü pastası is made with egg, flour, yogurt, and butter.

Other common desserts of this style are Van pastası, Kars pastası, Kaşık pastası, Erzurum pastası.

== See also ==
- Kurabiye
- Muğla halkası
