= Muğla halkası =

Turkish cookie

- Alternative names: Hıdırellez Halkası
- Type: Kurabiye
- Place of origin: Turkey
- Region or state: Muğla
- Created by: Ottoman cuisine
- Main ingredients: olive oil, baking powder, yogurt, egg, lemon juice and flour.

Muğla halkası (Hıdırellez Halkası; Turkish: Muğla halkası), or Hıdırellez Halkası, is a kind of Turkish cookie. It is made from olive oil, baking powder, yogurt, egg, lemon juice and flour.

== See also ==
- Acıbadem kurabiyesi
- Osmania Biscuit
- Köylü pastası
