= İzmir Bomb Kurabiye =

Turkish dessert

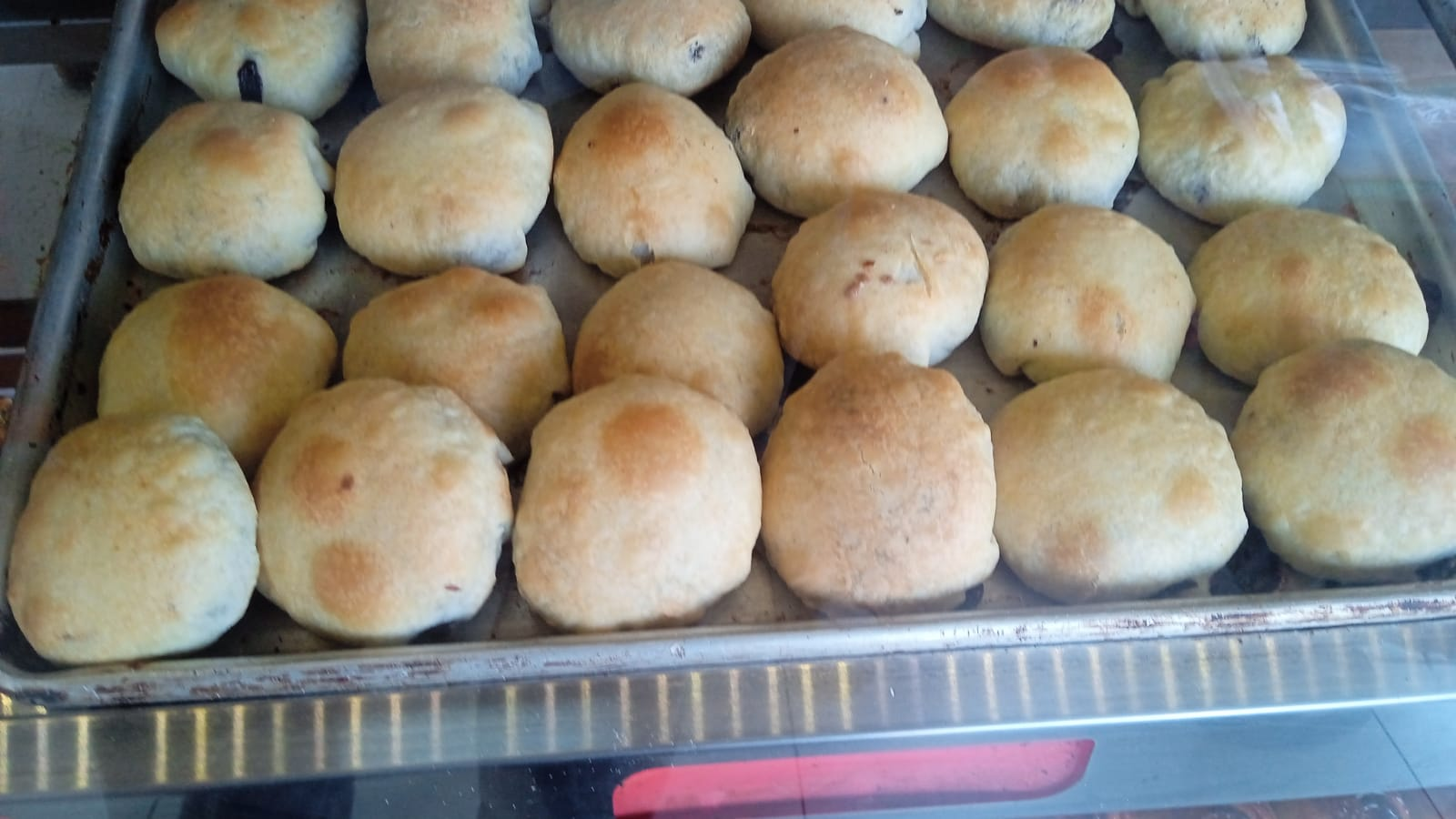
- Type: Kurabiye
- Place of origin: Turkey
- Region or state: İzmir
- Main ingredients: praline, flour, baking soda, salt, butter, granulated sugar, powdered sugar, egg, vanilla extract

External videos
- İzmir Bombası Tatlısı Tarifi (İzmir Bomb Dessert Recipe)

İzmir Bombası (English: İzmir Bomb), or Praline Stuffed Cookies, is a kurabiye from the Turkish cuisine filled with chocolate spread. The kurabiye gets its name from İzmir, the place where it originates. The dessert has a crispy dough layer on the outside and a fluid cream filling on the inside. Different stories have been published by Turkish media about who made the kurabiye first.

According to Google Trends, the İzmir Bomb was the 6th most searched recipe in Turkey in 2020.

== History ==
The dessert is believed to be an evolution of the Murabbalı mecidiye, which is a similar kurabiye from the Ottoman cuisine filled with apricot murabba. The cause of the popularity of the İzmir Bomb is the massive advertisement shared on social media.

== Types ==
The most common Bomb Kurabiye is made by filling white dough with chocolate spread or by filling brown dough with white chocolate spread. Apart from this there are also types with raspberries. After the dessert became popular, versions filled with poppy seed paste instead of chocolate spread have been made in the Afyonkarahisar Province.

== See also ==
- Sweet roll
- Fig roll
- Cinnamon roll
