= Murabba =

Sweet fruit preserve

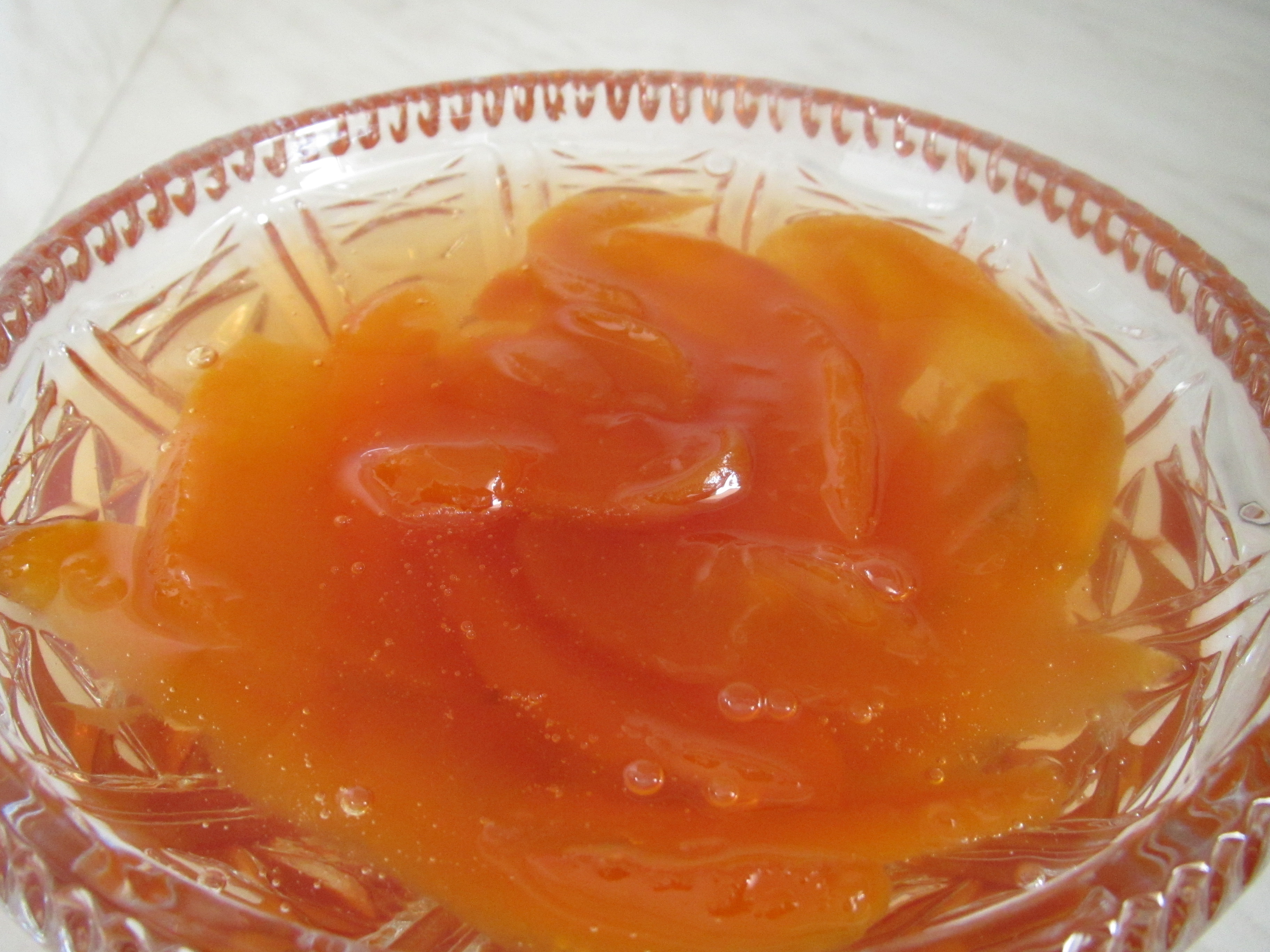
- Peach murabba
- Region or state: South Caucasus, West Asia, Central Asia, South Asia
- Main ingredients: fruits, berries, nuts, sugar

Murabba (from Arabic: مربى) is a sweet fruit preserve which is popular in many regions of South Caucasus, Central Asia, South Asia, and the Middle East. A similar dish to murabba (spoon sweets) is also popular in the Balkans. It is generally prepared with fruits, sugar, and spices.

== Etymology ==
The word murabba is of Arabic origin. Murabbā (مربّى) in Arabic literally means "something made into rubb (رُبّ)". Rubb is fruit juice that has been cooked and thickened (inspissated). The verb rabbā is used to refer to preserving fruit by cooking it with sugar or honey until it reduces and sets into a concentrated syrup.

In Hindi, murabba (Hindi: मुरब्बा) refers to preserved fruits or jams.

== History ==
The 10th-century Arabic cookbook Kitāb al-Ṭabīkh by Abbasid author Ibn Sayyar al-Warraq dedicates an entire chapter to making fruit conserves (murabbayat). Medieval cookbooks included recipes for rose petal murabba.

The 1867 dictionary Arabic–English Lexicon by Edward William Lane described murabba as "preserves, or confections" made with "inspissated juice" (رب). An 1895 translation by Socrates Spiro described مربى (mirabby) in English as "jam" or "marmalade".

== Regional varieties ==
=== India ===
In India, popular fruits that are candied and left in Its own syrup are apple, fig, cherry, pear, Indian gooseberry (amla), unripe mango, carrots, plum, quince, peach and winter melon.

=== Armenia ===
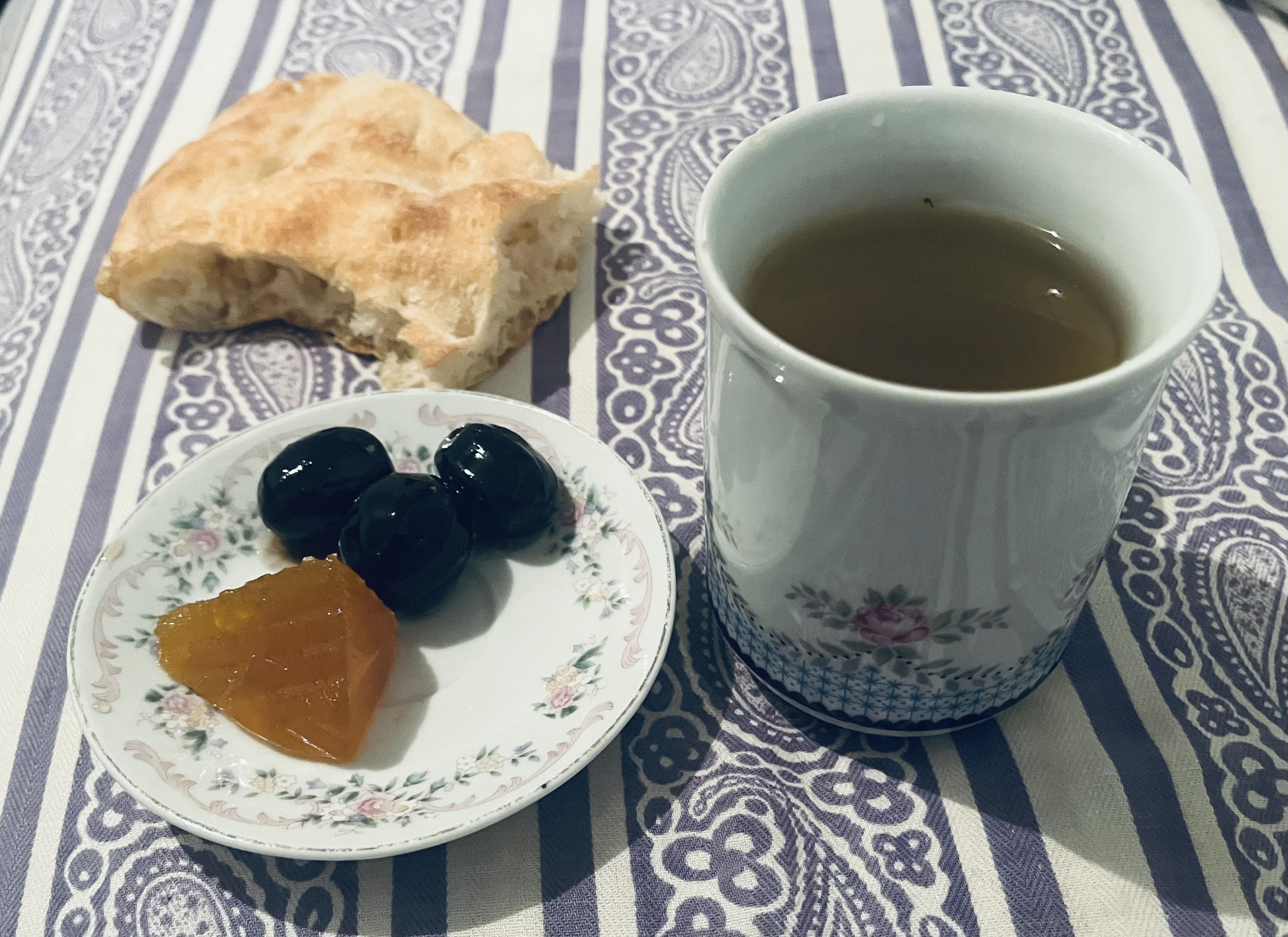
Armenian walnut and pumpkin murabba alongside tea and matnakash

The most popular fruits and other ingredients turned into murabba (Armenian: մուրաբա) in Armenia/Armenian cuisine are watermelon, watermelon rind, quince, pumpkin, apricot, mulberry, raspberry, pear, cherry, cornelian cherry, plum, pomegranate, and walnut.

=== Arab world ===
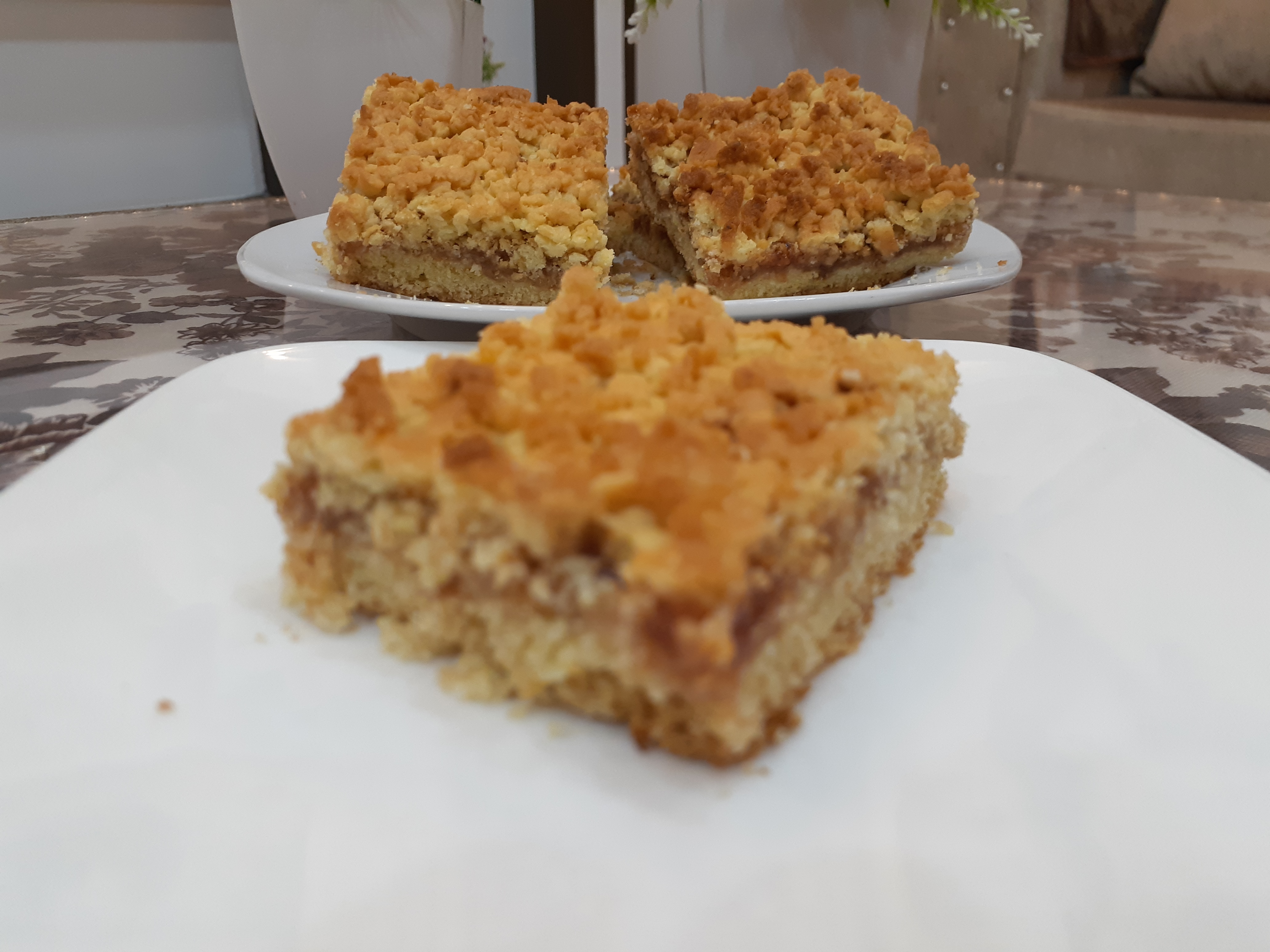
Palestinian mabroosha

In Lebanon and Syria, figs are traditionally made into anise-flavored murabba during the summer, often mixed with nuts. Mabroosha (Arabic: مبروشة, lit. 'brushed') is a Levantine pie filled with murabba.

Antebikh (Arabic: عنطبيخ) or ainabia (Arabic: عنبية) is a traditional grape murabba from Hebron flavored with anise seeds.

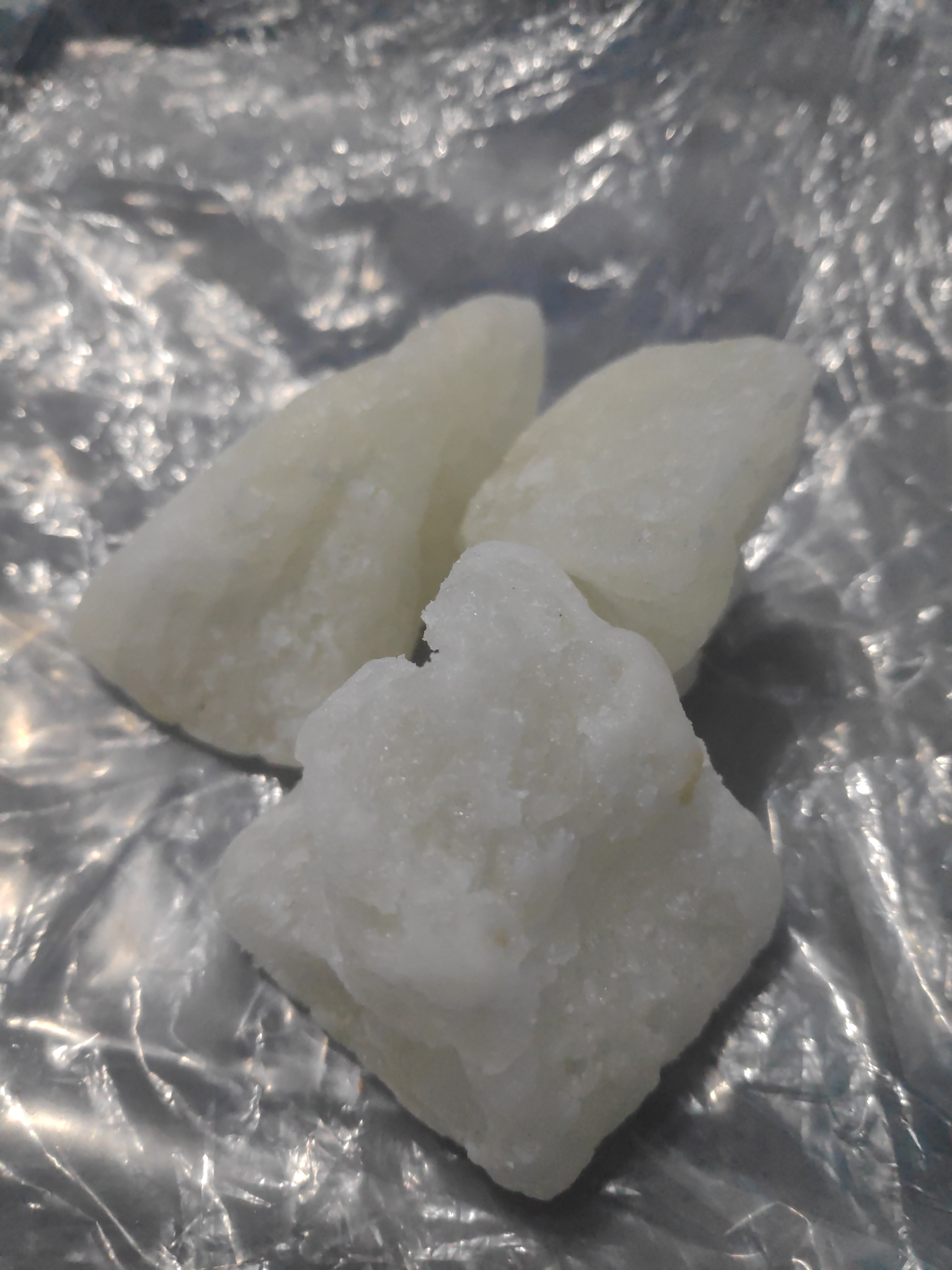
Winter Melon Murabba from Nepal

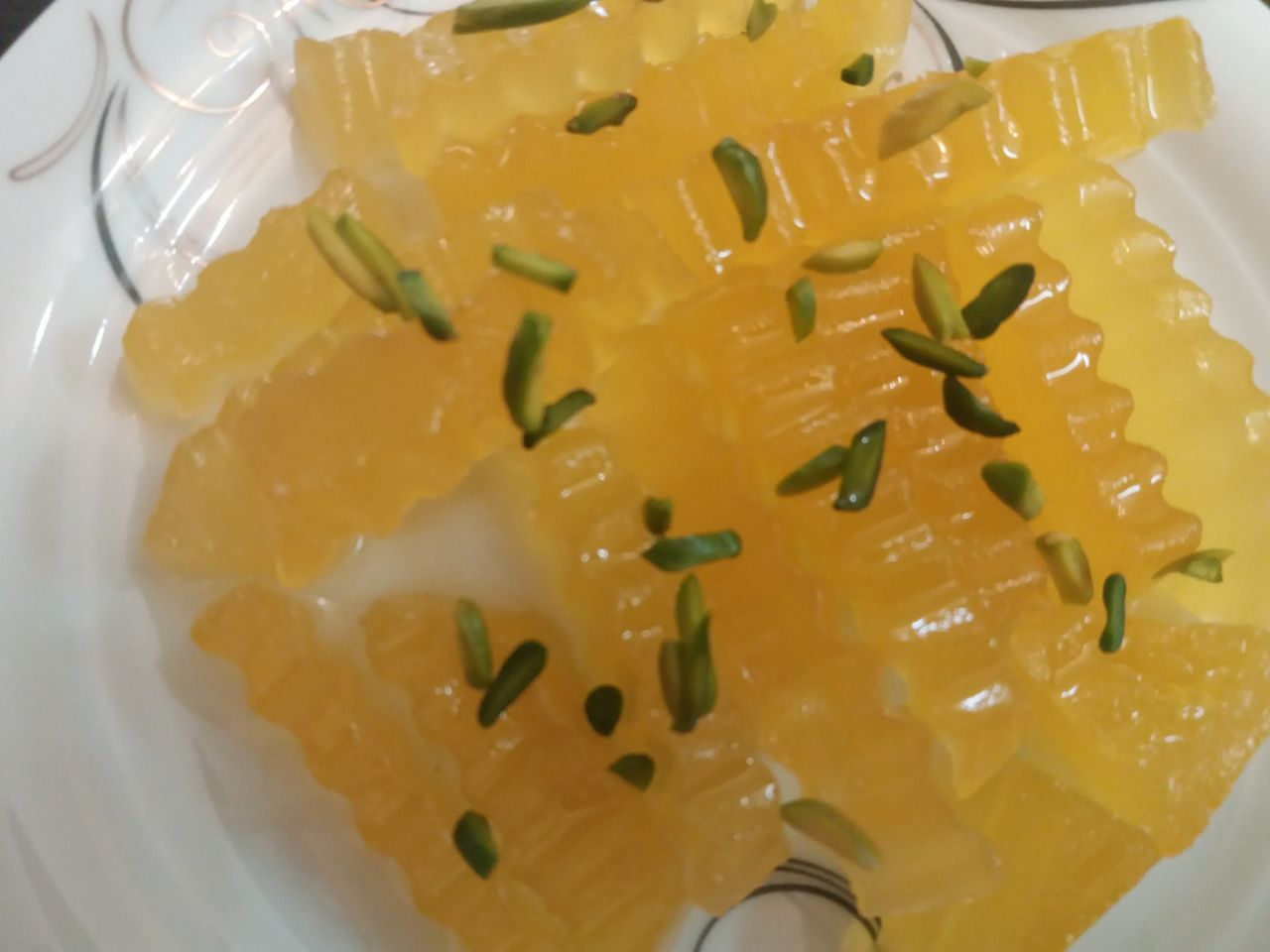
Butternut Pumpkin jam or murabba in Tabriz, Iranian Azerbaijan

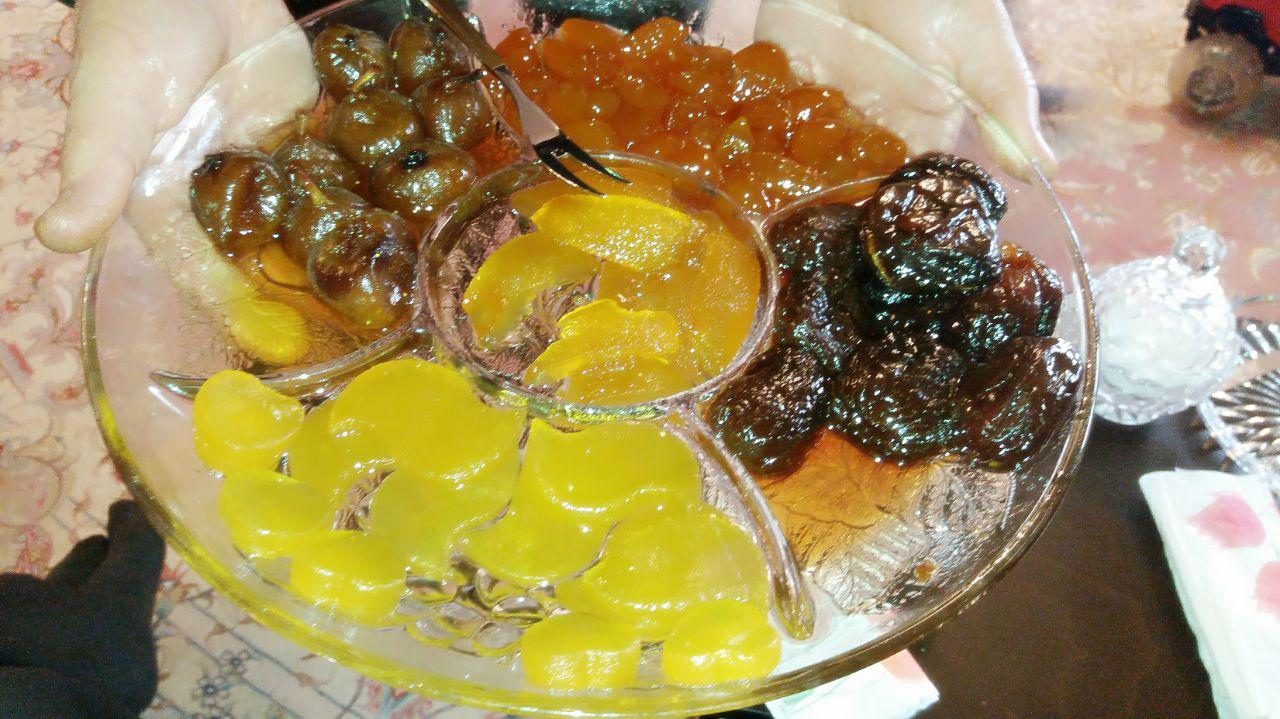
Different types of murabba in Tabriz, Iranian Azerbaijan

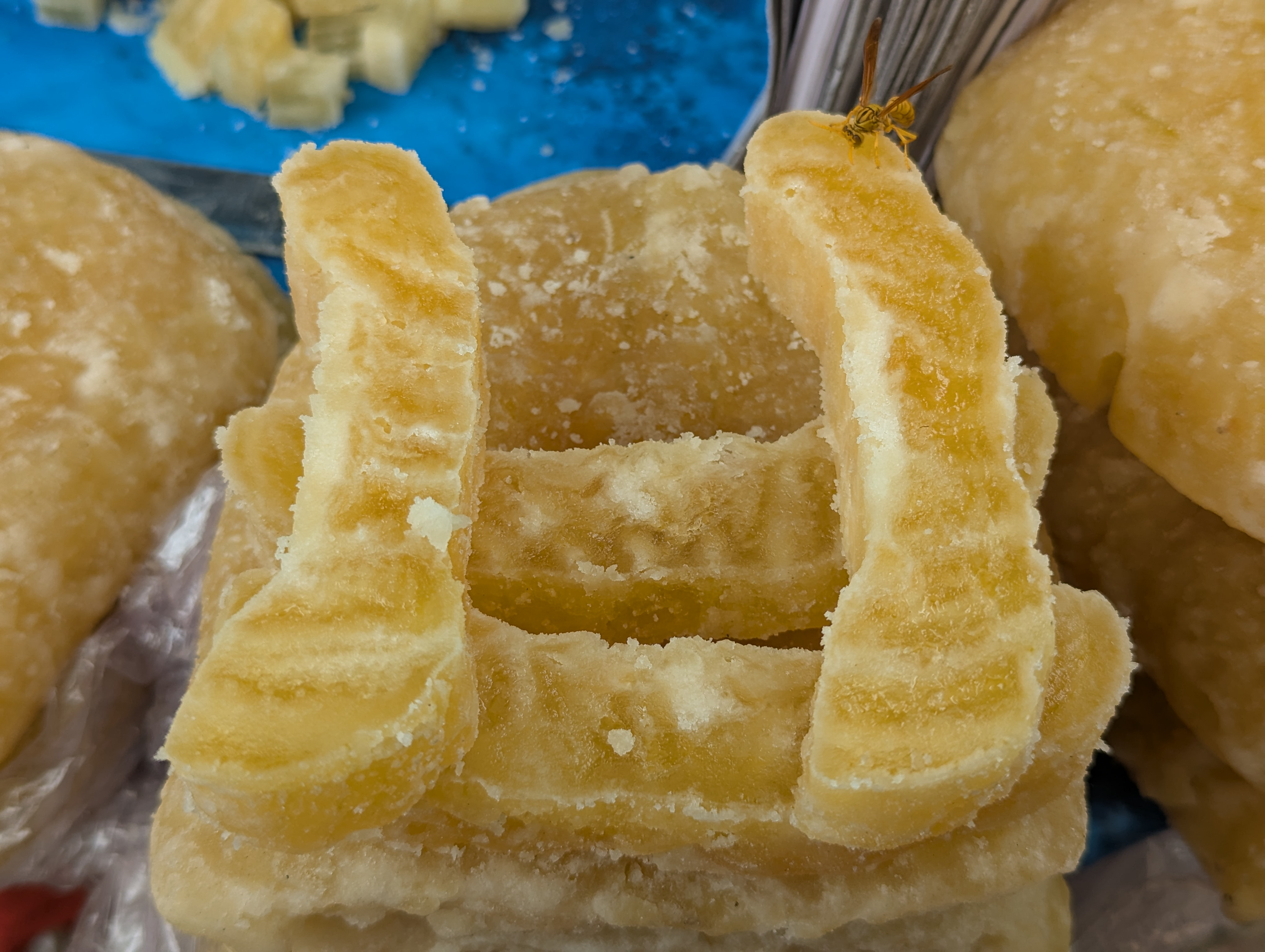
Fruit Murabba from Bangladesh

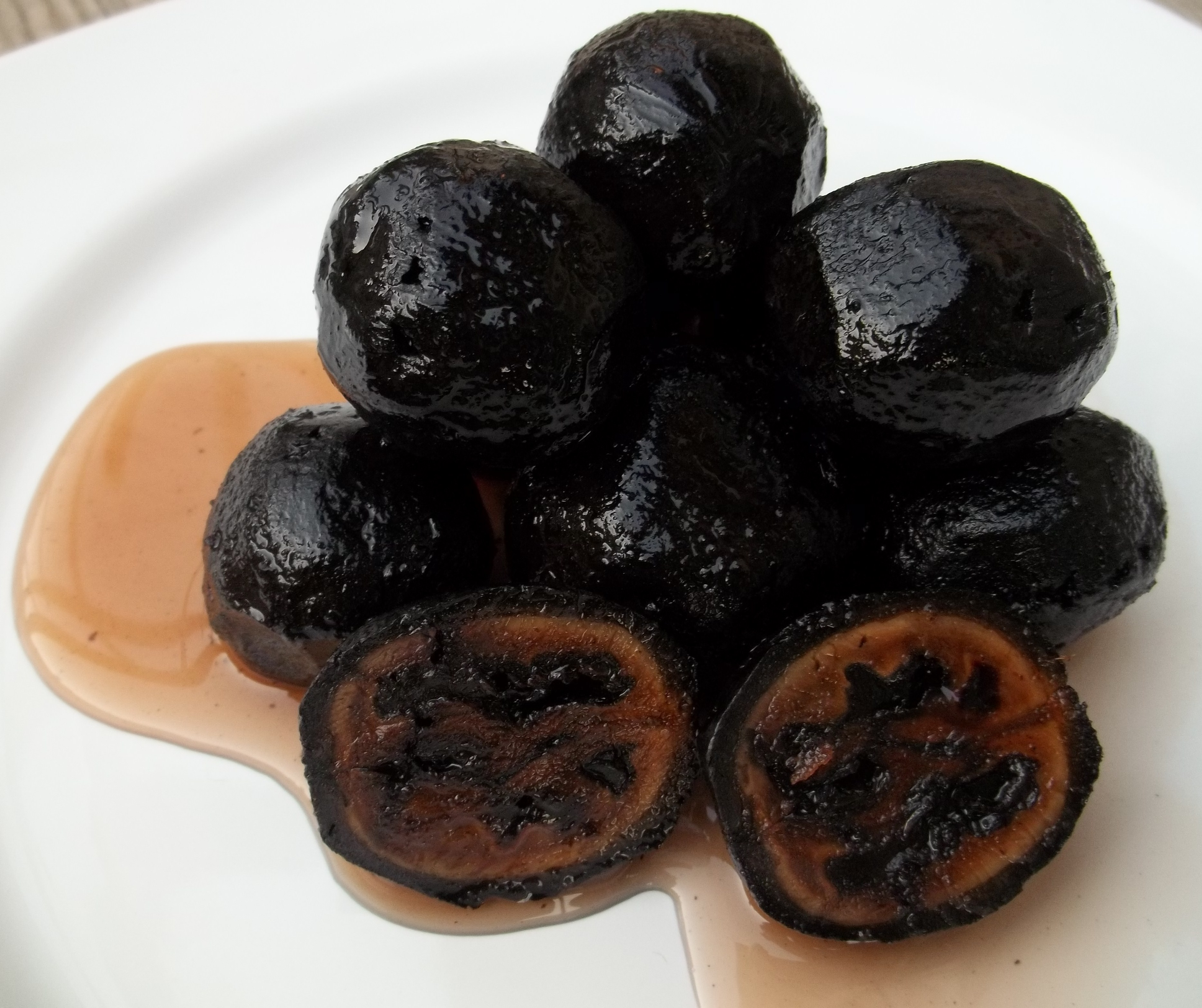
Walnut Murabba from Georgia

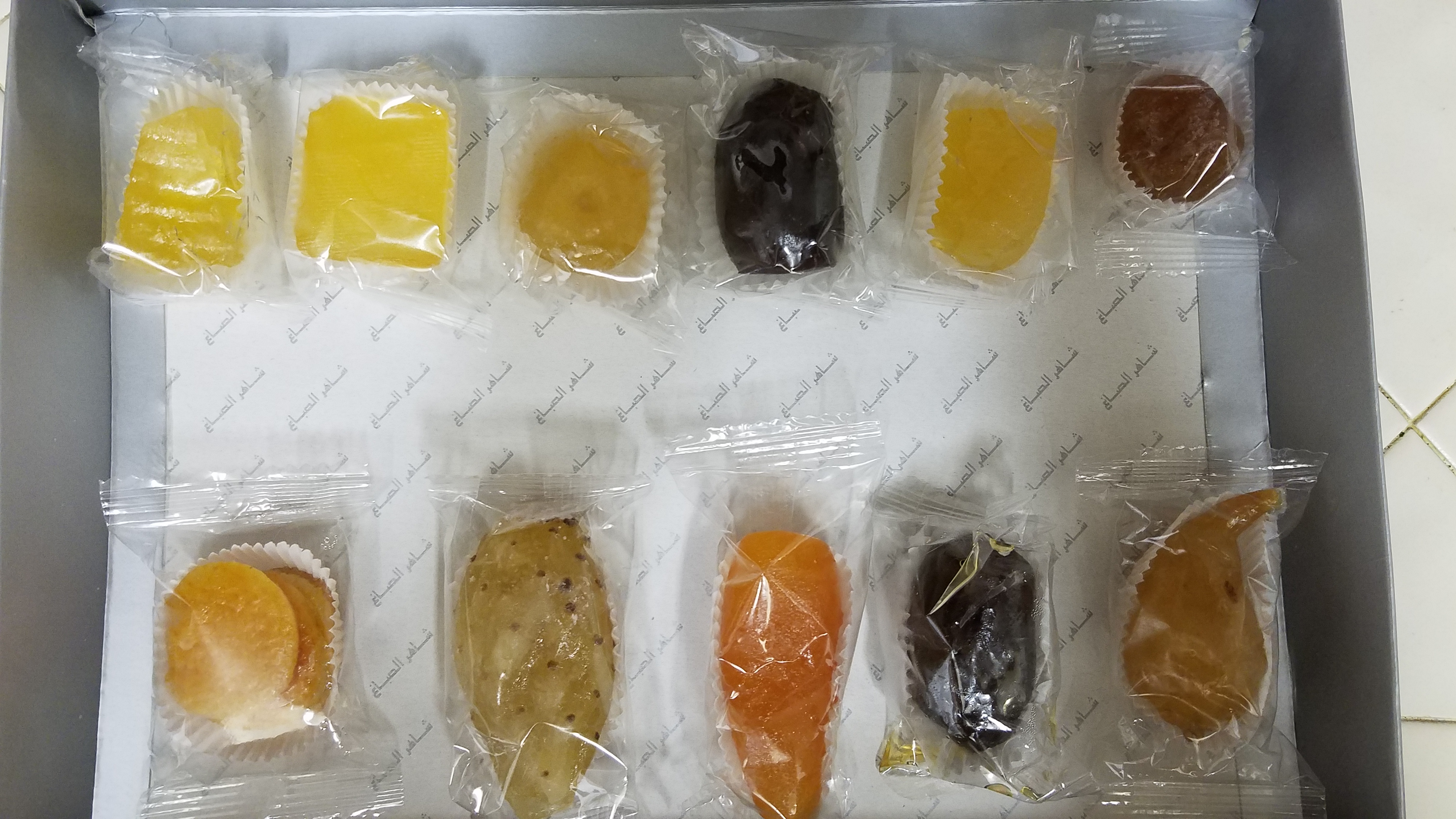
Murabba assortment from Aleppo, Syria

== See also ==
- Spoon sweets, similar dish in the Balkans
- Slatko
