= Birnbrot =

Swiss sweet pear bread

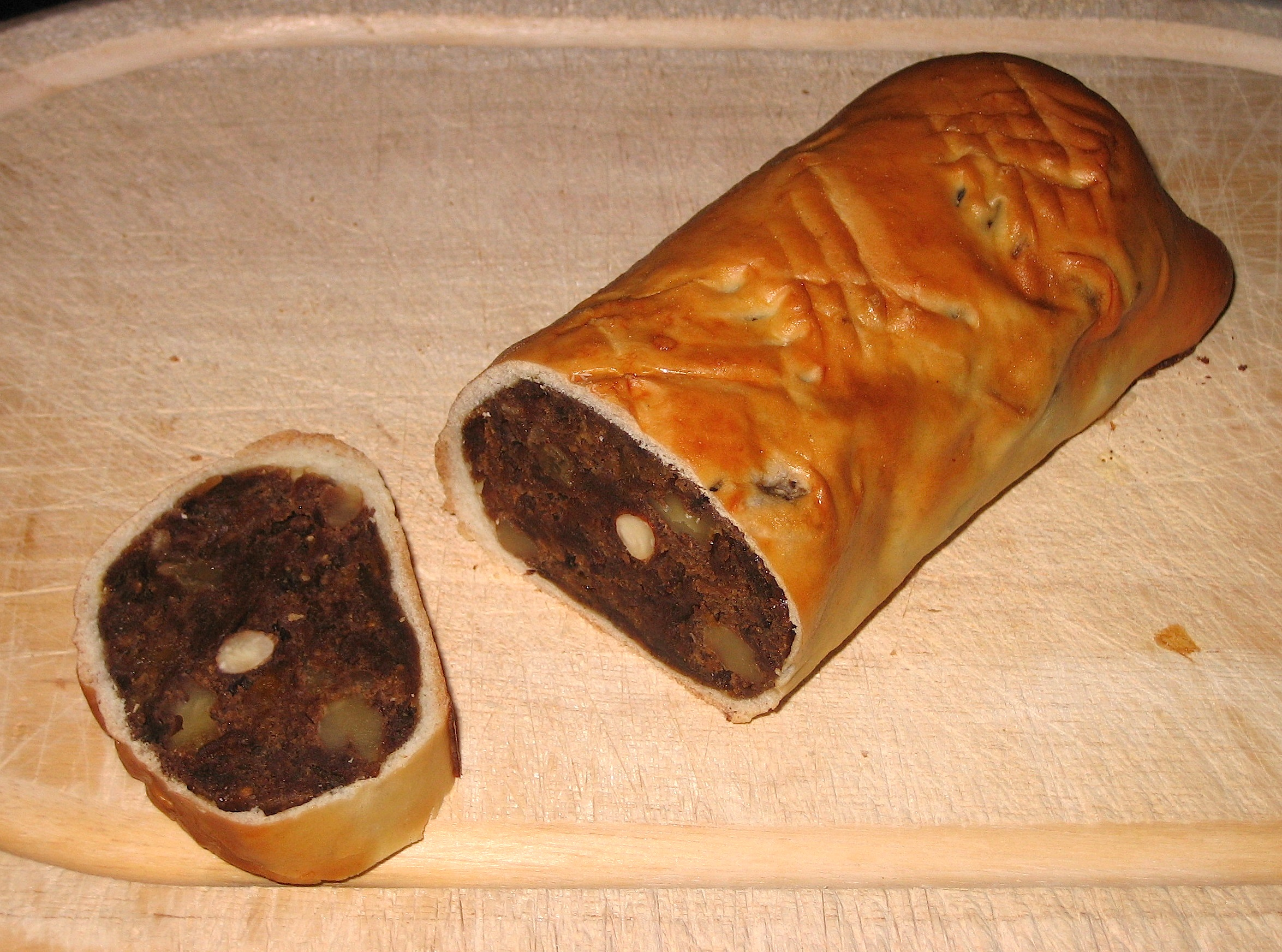
- Alternative names: Birnweggen
- Type: Pastry
- Place of origin: Switzerland
- Main ingredients: Dried fruit (pears, apples, figs), raisins, walnuts, candied fruit
- Ingredients generally used: coriander, cinnamon, star anise, anise, clove, alcohol
- Variations: Bündener Birnbrot, Glarner Birnbrot, Toggenburger Birnbrot, Luzerner Birnweggen
- Similar dishes: Fig roll

Birnbrot (literally pear bread) or Birnweggen (literally pear buns) are a traditional baked good originating in Switzerland with a filling of dried pears. They exist throughout Switzerland and popular variations include "Bündener Birnbrot" (from the Kanton Graubünden), "Glarner Birnbrot" (from the Kanton Glarus), "Toggenburger Birnbrot" (from Toggenburg) and "Luzerner Birnweggen" (from Luzern).

== Description ==
Besides dried pears the filling also contains raisins, walnuts and other dried fruit such as apples or figs. The filling is additionally flavored with candied fruit, coriander, cinnamon, star anise, anise, clove and some sort of alcohol.

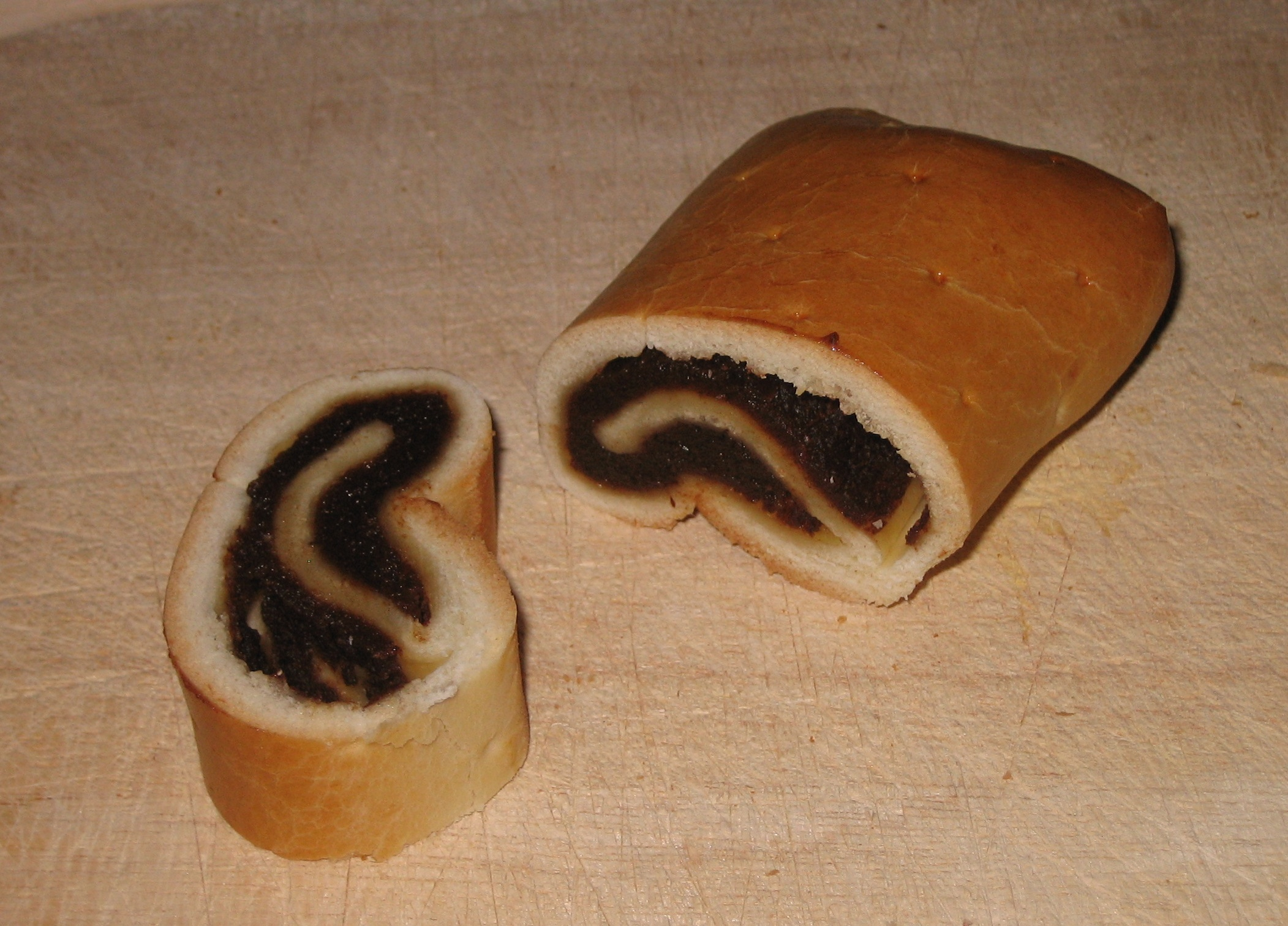
Birnweggen

The difference between Birnbrot and Birnweggen lies in the way of preparation and the geographical prevalence: Birnbrot is prepared by mixing the filling with dough and surrounding it with a casing of yeast dough while Birnweggen are made by spreading the filling on a sheet of yeast dough and rolling it like a Swiss roll. Birnweggen are popular in Central Switzerland and Birnbrot can be found in Eastern Switzerland near the Alps.

The variations of Toggenburg and Glarus cook and sear the pears before mixing it with the other ingredients. In Graubünden the pears are soaked in pear brandy or rose water which gives a more distinguishable pear taste.

== History ==
Originally it was a bread variation for peasants that lengthened the expensive wheat with dried fruit. In Graubünden, local variations can be found that feature a greater amount of bread dough and are not cased in yeast dough.

Nowadays it is a popular pastry around Christmas and New Year's Eve and there are some customs around it. For example, in Engadin girls give their favourite classmate a Birnbrot on 26 December and are in return invited to a sleigh ride. Despite that, it is available throughout the whole year in German-speaking Switzerland and is eaten with butter and flavorful cheese for tea or as a picnic for hikers or skiers.

== See also ==
- List of pastries
- Culinary Heritage of Switzerland
