= Kavala Almond Cookies =

Turkish culinary dish

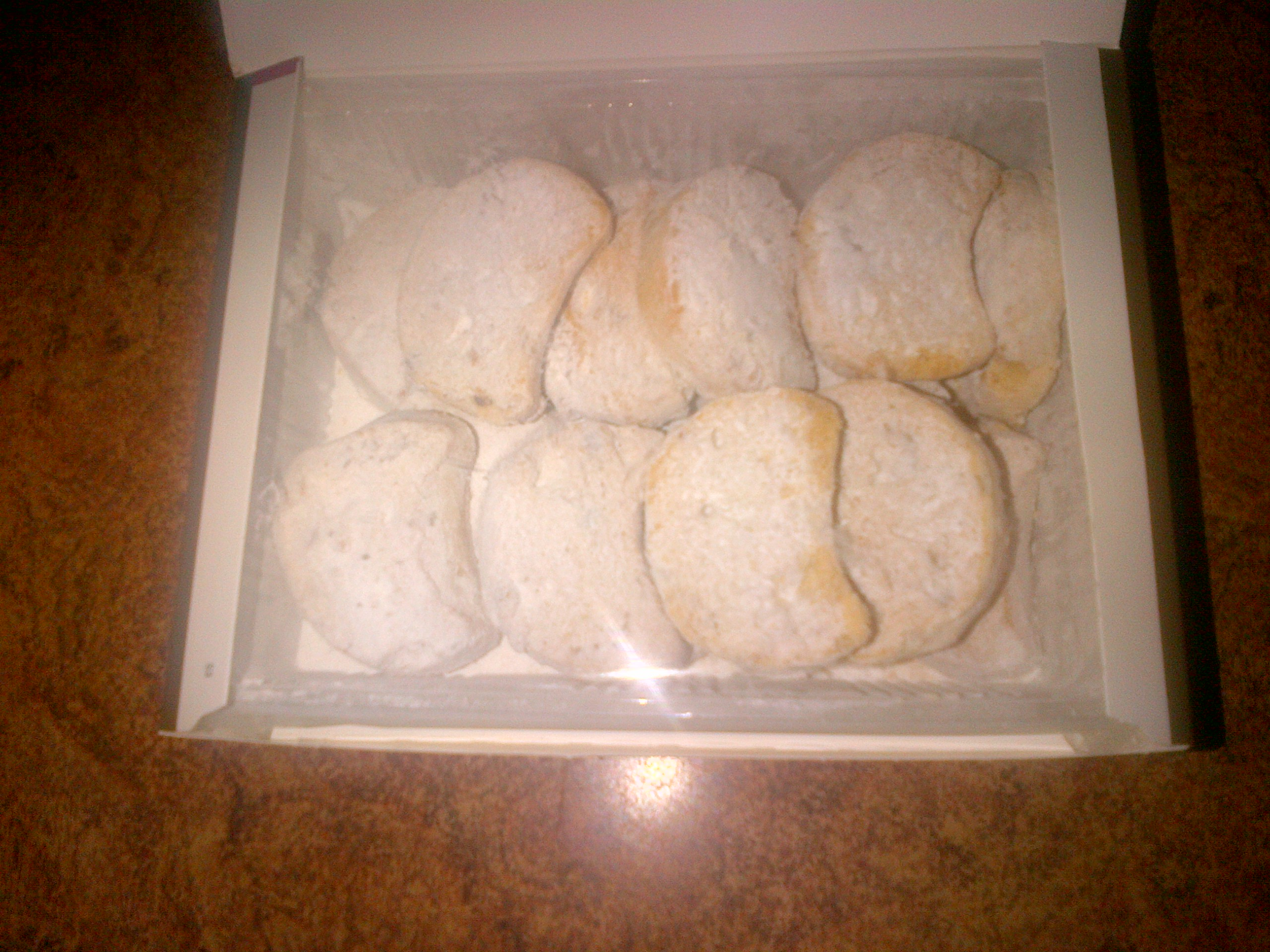
- Alternative names: Kavala Cookies
- Type: Kurabiye
- Place of origin: Turkey
- Region or state: Edirne
- Main ingredients: Almond, flour, baking soda, salt, butter, granulated sugar, powdered sugar, egg, mastic

Kavala Almond Cookies, Kavala Cookies (Turkish: Kavala Kurabiyesi) or Edirne Almond Cookies (Turkish: Edirne Bademli Kurabiyesi) is a kurabiye from Turkish cuisine. The Kavala cookie is made with almond, flour and butter. The kurabiye gets its name from Kavala. The modern recipe of the cookie originated during the Ottoman Empire.

== See also ==
- Kurabiye
- Kourabiedes
