= Watermelon rind preserves =

Fruit condiment

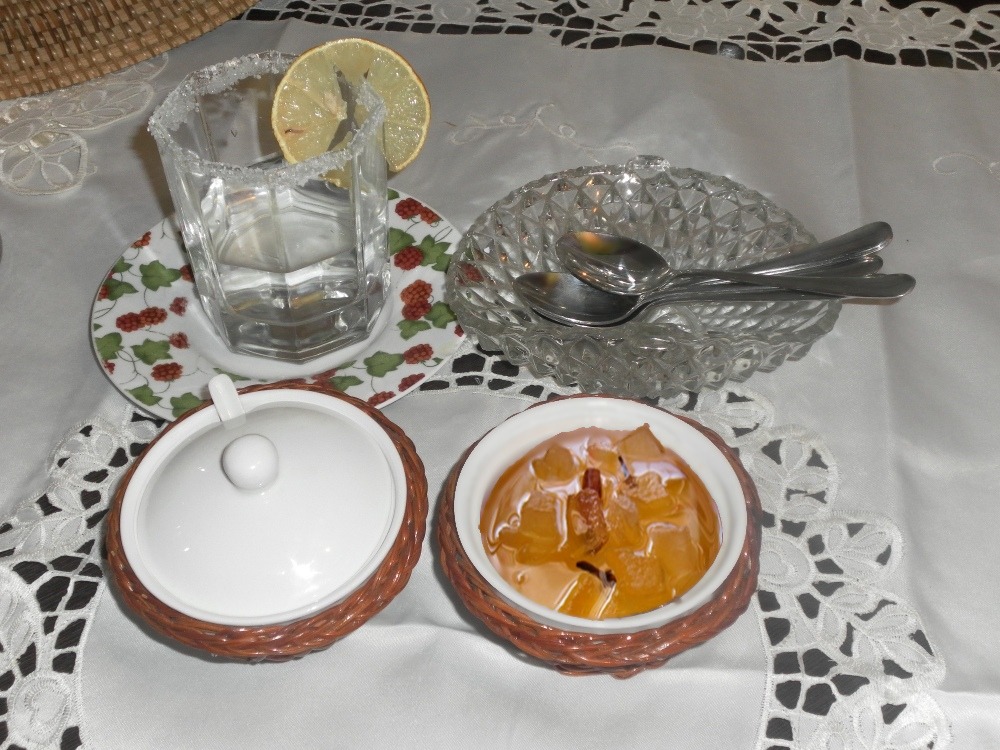
Slatko watermelon rind preserves (bottom right)

Watermelon rind preserves are made by boiling chunks of watermelon rind with sugar and other ingredients. The mixture is then canned in glass jars. According to some recipes, the rind is pared to only the white portion, strips or cubes of which are soaked overnight in a solution of lime or salt and water, then rinsed. It is then boiled, combined with sugar and flavorings such as ginger and lemon, and cooked until the rind is clear.

In Armenian cuisine, this preserve is part of a larger group of preserves named murabba (Armenian: մուրաբա). In the United States, these preserves are typical of Southern cuisine. A Serbian variety is called slatko od lubenice.

== See also ==
- Fruit preserves
- List of melon dishes
