= Spoon sweets =

Confectionary

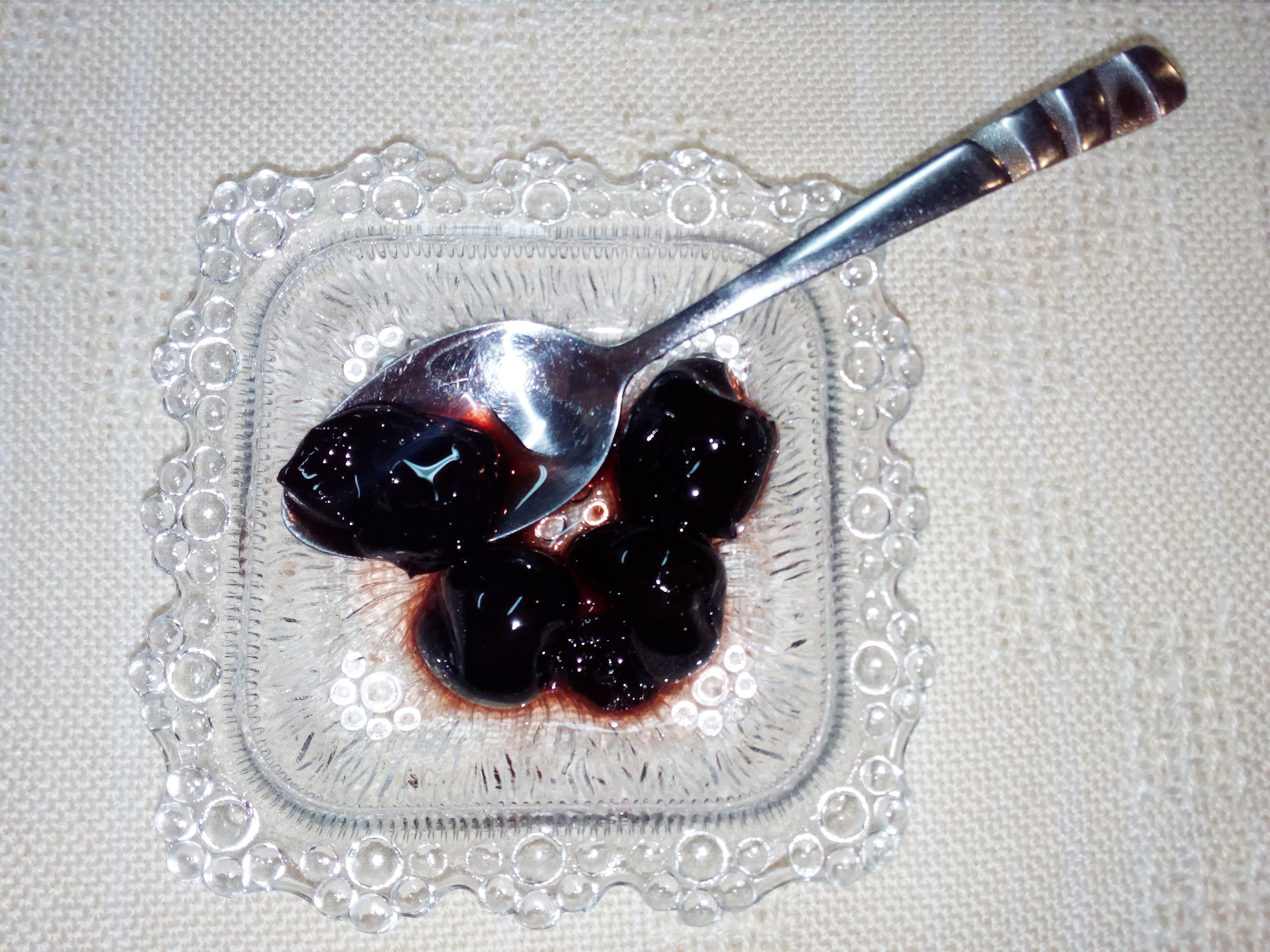
- Spoon sweet sour cherry
- Type: Jam or preserve
- Place of origin: Balkans, Levant
- Main ingredients: Fruit, sugar

Spoon sweets are sweet preserves, served in a spoon as a gesture of hospitality in the Balkans and Levant. They can be made from almost any fruit, though sour and bitter fruits are especially prized. There are also spoon sweets produced without fruit.

Some of the fruits that are used include seedless grapes, mulberries, strawberries and other berries, bergamot, apricots, quinces, apples, pears, sour and sweet cherries, oranges, kumquats, lemons, grapefruit, tangerines, pomegranates, figs, prunes, etc. Watermelon and melon can also be made into spoon sweets, but because their flesh is too delicate to retain its texture, the rind is traditionally used instead. Other varieties include green, unripe walnuts, pistachios, hazelnuts, and other nuts, or even flower petals like rose. Many fruits or parts of fruits that are normally inedible, such as the various citrus peels and blossoms, or sliced citrus fruits with their peel intact, can be made into sweet, flavorful preserves, as can some vegetables such as baby eggplants or cherry tomatoes. A well-made spoon sweet retains the original shape, color, aroma and taste of the fruit.

Spoon sweets are usually offered to guests served by the teaspoon in a small porcelain or crystal glass dish or bowl, with coffee or tea and cold water. Most of the time they are homemade, but they can also be found in most supermarkets; these are more likely to be made with glucose syrup rather than sugar, for reasons of cost and ease of preparation.

They can be used as ice cream or yogurt toppings, or in the Western way as a spread on toast for breakfast. Spoon sweets are commonly eaten alone or with cheese.

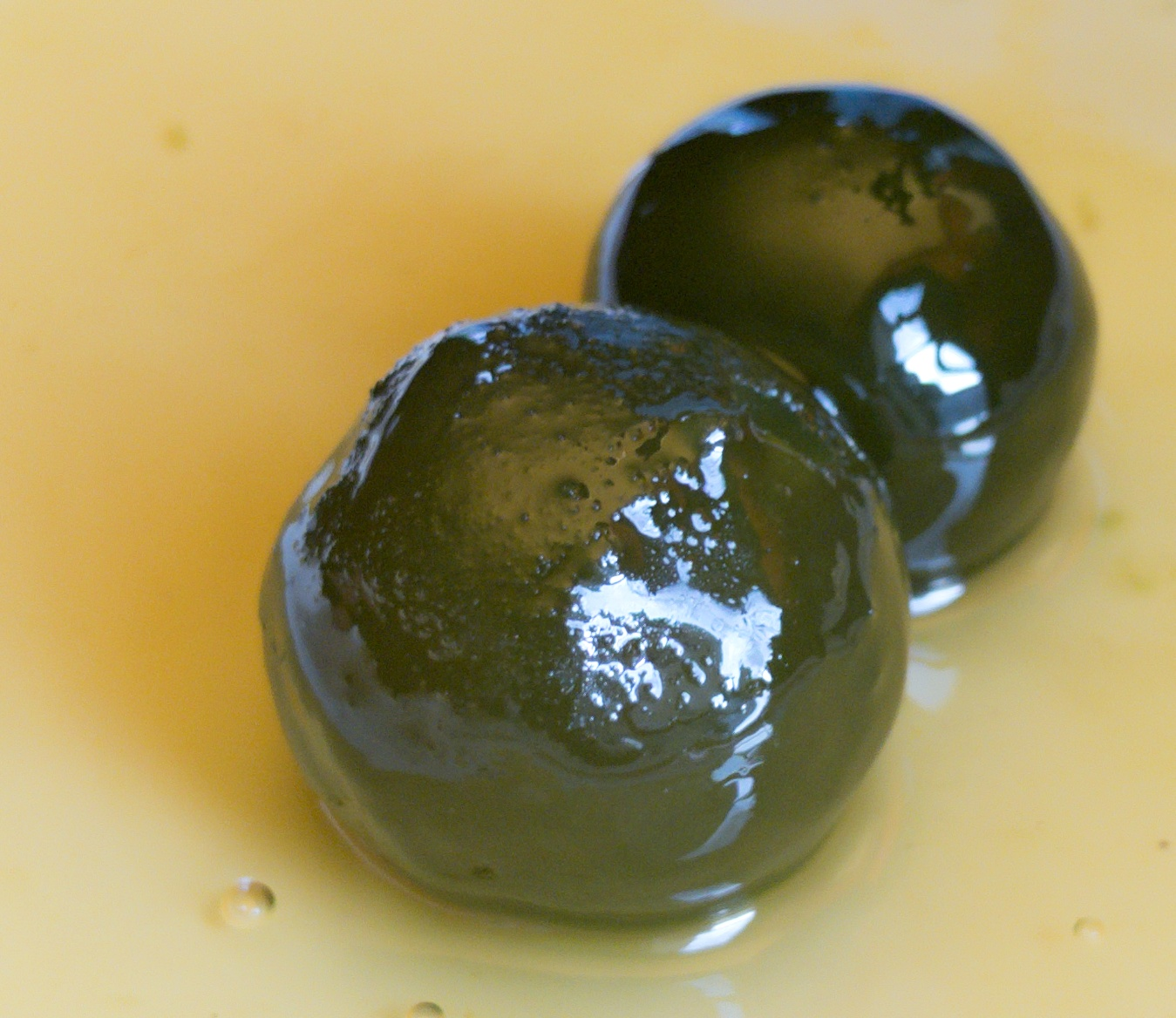
Bitter oranges served in syrup as spoon sweets

== Greece and Cyprus ==
Spoon sweets (γλυκό του κουταλιού glykó tou koutalioú 'sweet of the spoon') are popular in Greece and Cyprus, usually served with Greek coffee and a glass of cold water. Most are made of whole fruit, though some kinds are made of pieces or purees.

Way to serve spoon sweet "Vanilla submarine"

One typically Greek spoon sweet is the snow-white and intensely aromatic vaníllia (βανίλια, [va'niʎa]) which is not made of vanilla, but of mastic resin, for which the Aegean island of Chios is famous. This is usually served as a spoonful of sweet on a table spoon dropped into a tall glass of ice-cold water and popularly called "βανίλια υποβρύχιο" vainíllia ypovrýchio, a "vanilla submarine". It is a thick, white, sweet paste made industrially by beating mastic resin with table sugar. When cold, it has the consistency of hard caramel candy: it is meant to be licked like a lollipop as, at body temperature, it gradually becomes softer and more chewable. The Greek diaspora introduced this treat to other countries as far away as Japan.

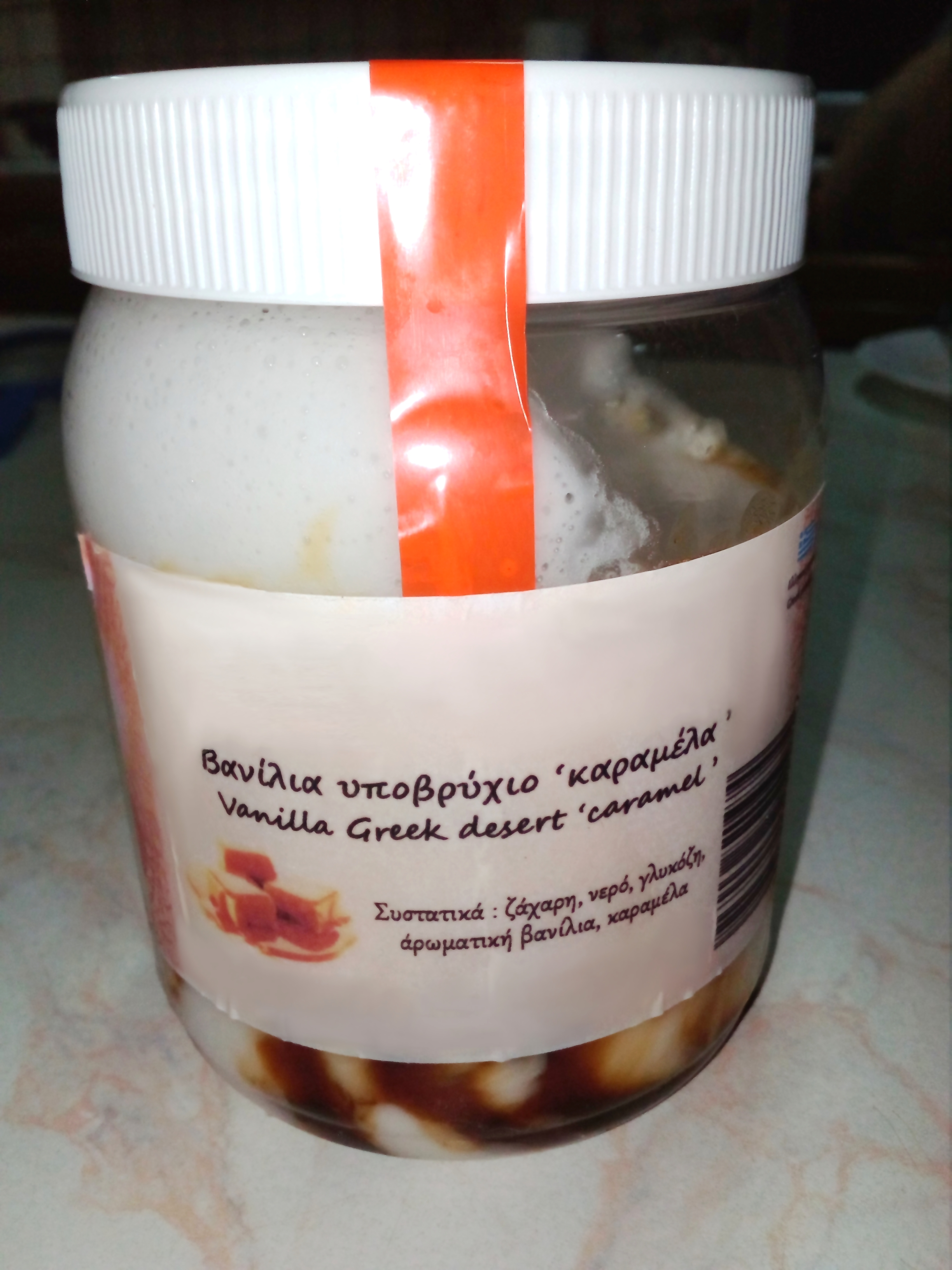
Vanilla and caramel submarine

It is regarded as the official sweet of the Patriarchate of Constantinople.

Whole fruit preserves can be found in most Greek and Cypriot homes. They are made by slowly and gently boiling fruit in water and sugar over several hours or days, until the syrup sets. Thus the main prerequisites to making good spoon sweets are said to be "patience and a heavy pot". Some lemon juice is often added to preserve the fruit's original color, as the citric acid prevents oxidation. A small quantity of blanched almonds, slivered or whole, may also be added for crunch, often to baby eggplants, apples or grapes. Ingredients variously added during the boiling, and then discarded, include a quill of cinnamon bark, a mint bouquet, or the green, fragrant leaves of the shrub Pelargonium odoratissimum (apple geranium) or Pelargonium graveolens (rose geranium) which add some astringency and a slight aroma of frankincense and is especially popular in the Ionian islands.

The overall method of preparation is essentially the same as that of marmalade, except that fruit pieces remain firm and whole; a well-made spoon sweet is chewy.

== Albania and Kosovo ==
Spoon sweets (Albanian: Reçel) are very common throughout Albanian cuisines and generally eaten in combination with xhezve coffee, balancing out the bitterness of the coffee. Popular spoon sweets variants are Reçel i kumbullave (Plum spoon sweets), Reçel i ftoit (Quince spoon sweets), Reçel i mollave (Apple spoon sweets), Reçel i portokallit (Orange spoon sweets), Reçel i rrushit (Grape spoon sweets), Reçel i kungullit me arra (Pumpkin spoon sweets with nuts), etc.

They are generally made at home and preserved in old jars, ready to be served to guests and family members on festival days.

== See also ==
- List of spreads
- Slatko
