= Slatko =

Fruit preserve

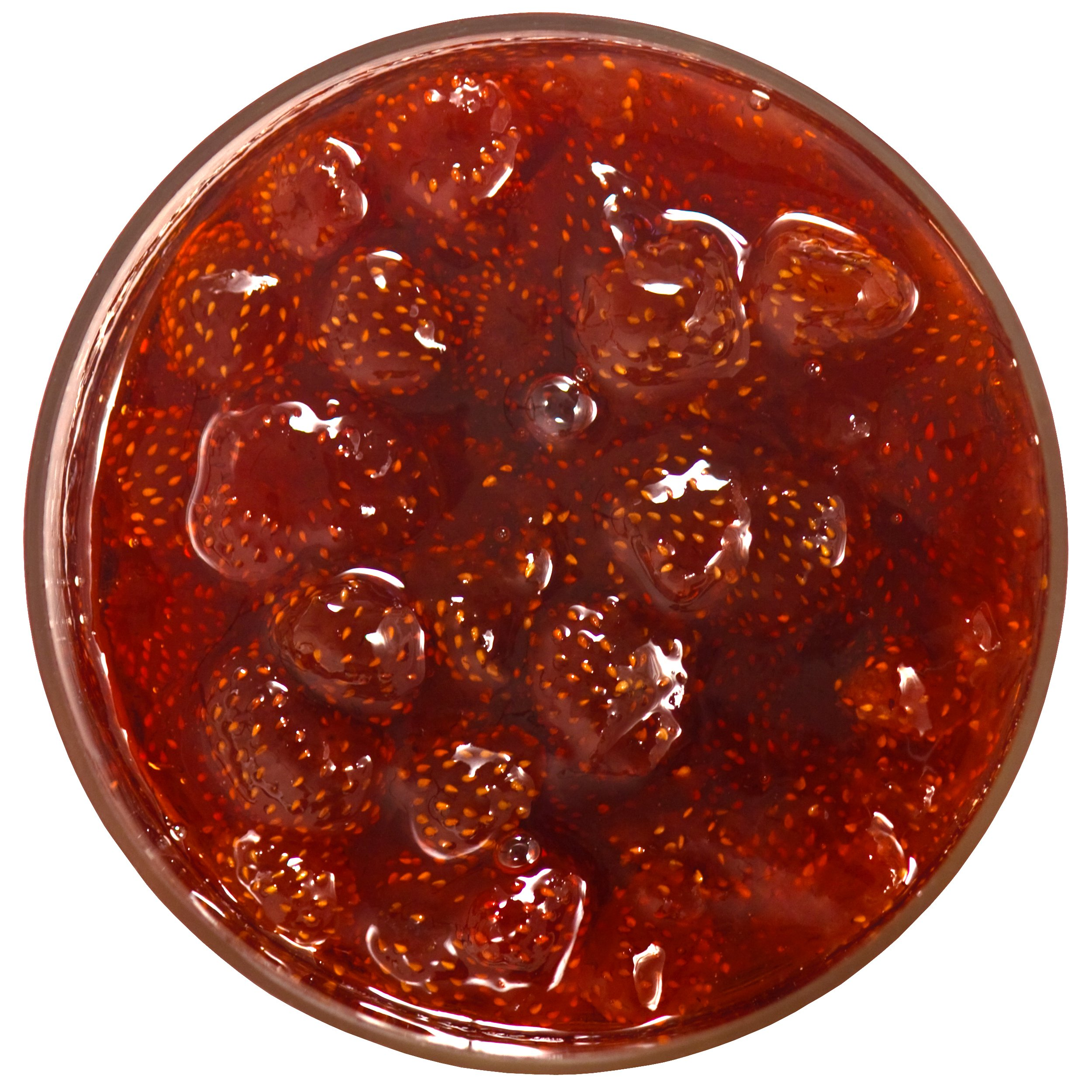
- Slatko with woodland strawberries
- Type: Dessert topping
- Place of origin: Bulgaria, Serbia and the Balkans
- Main ingredients: Fruit or rose petals

Slatko (Serbian: слаткō / slatkō; Macedonian: слатко, romanized: slatko; Bulgarian: сладко, romanized: sladko; meaning "sweet") is a thin fruit preserve made of fruit or rose petals in Bulgarian, Macedonian, and Serbian cuisine. Almost any kind of fruit can be used, including wild strawberry, blueberry, plum or cherry.

== Traditions ==
Traditionally, all guests in Serbian and Bulgarian homes are greeted with a spoonful of slatko/sladko and a cup of water immediately after being seated. Particularly honoured guests are offered twice, although any guest can ask for another taste, to honour the housekeeper. For the second taste another spoon must be used. To ask for the third taste, if not offered, is regarded as an improper behaviour, although usually granted. Alternatively, in the same manner, the guests may be offered honey (or asked to choose between the two). Prior to the creation of Yugoslavia, the tradition of slatko was common and widespread only in the historical Serbia, south of Sava and Danube, and was unknown in Vojvodina or other parts of Austro-Hungarian Empire.

== Variants ==
The most common types of slatko are those made of whole strawberries, slightly unripe skinned plums or sour cherries. Other fresh fruits like raspberries, sweet cherries, watermelon cubes, rose petals, quinces, grapes, figs, skinned apricot halves or quarters, peaches, blueberries, blackberries or redcurrants can also be used. If a plum slatko is prepared, walnut halves or almonds may be added to the mixture or even inserted into the plums themselves to replace the pits. Some fruits and vegetables (like rhubarb and physalis) rarely grown in Serbia have also been demonstrated to be well suited for slatko. Frozen berries and fruits are sometimes used as well, in which case the amount of water used and the cooking time are adjusted accordingly.

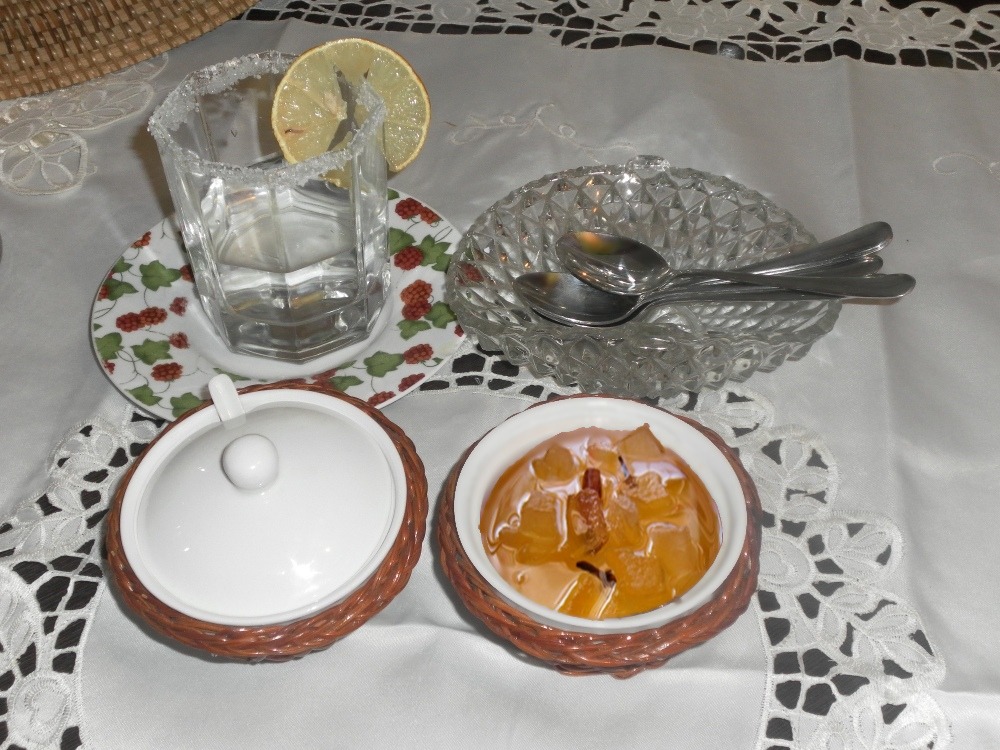
Slatko made from watermelon rinds - the traditional way to serve slatko

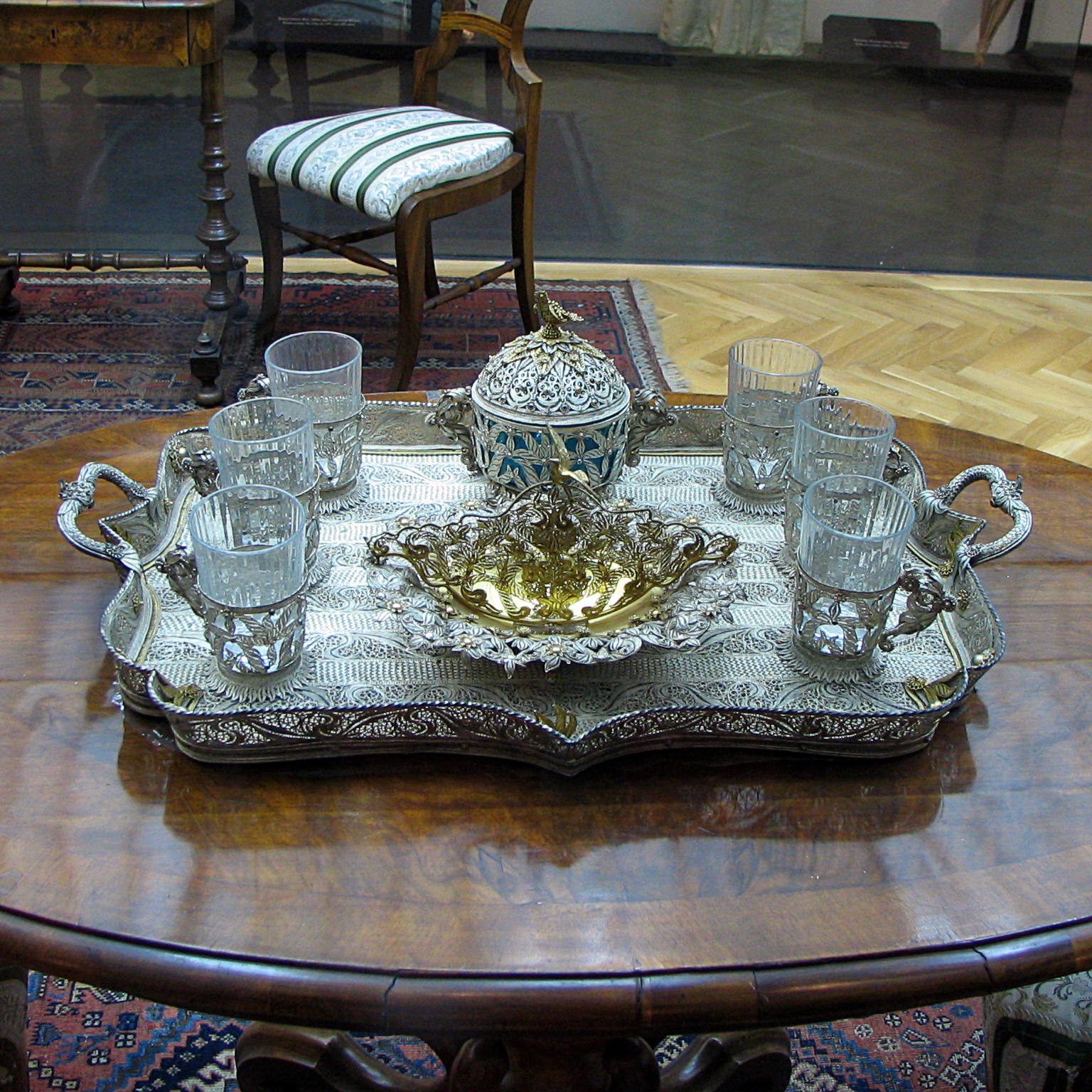
Tableware for serving slatko and water

== See also ==
- Spoon sweets
- List of dessert sauces
