= Ghorayeba =

Shortbread-like cookies

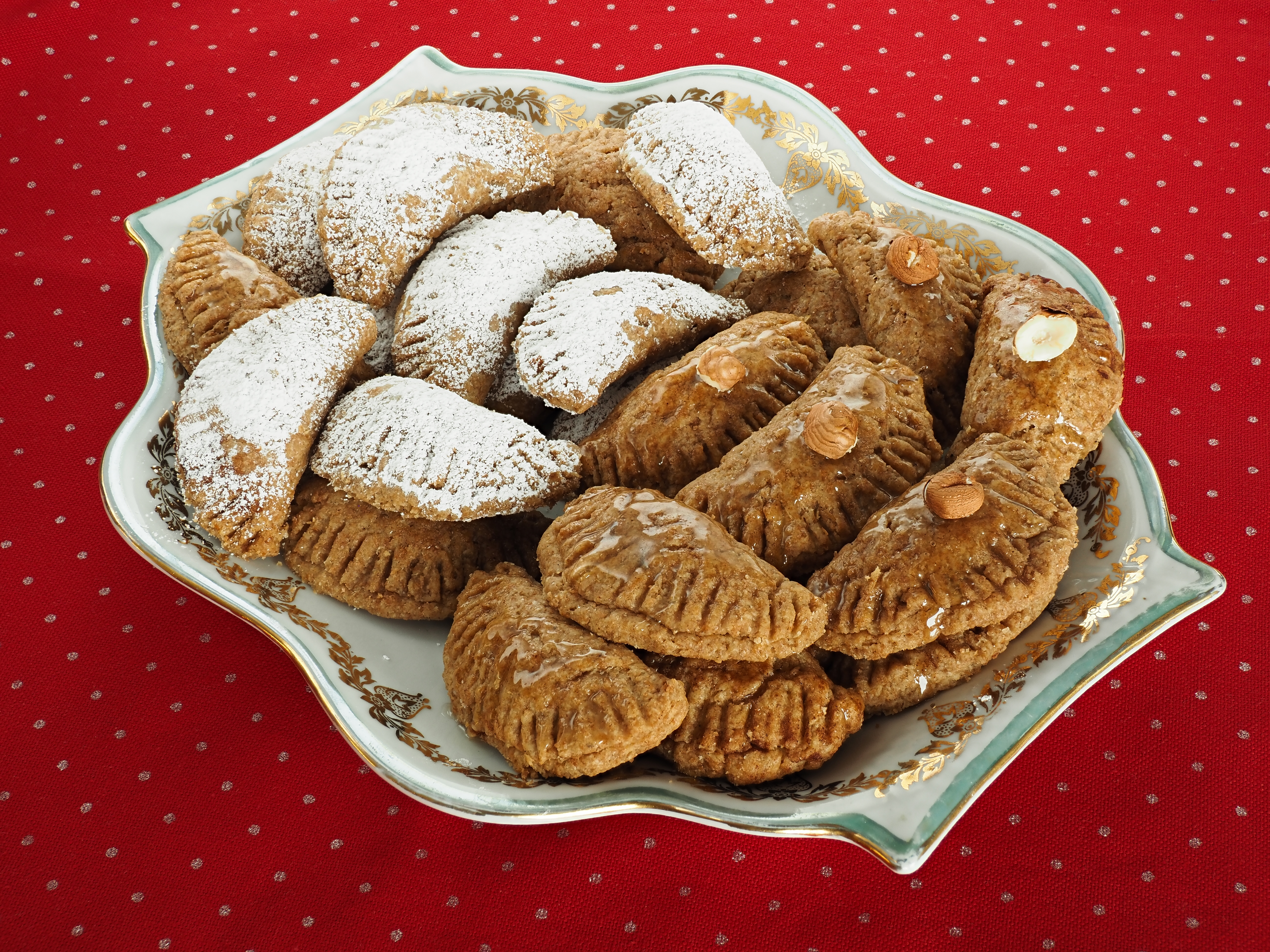
- A plate of Serbian-style Christmas gurabija
- Alternative names: Ghraybeh, Kurabie
- Type: Shortbread
- Region or state: Maghreb, West Asia, Balkans, Crimea
- Main ingredients: Almond flour, sugar, egg white, vanilla

Ghorayeba(h) (Note: With numerous other spellings and pronunciations: ghoriba or ghraybeh (Arabic: غريبة), qurabiya (Persian: قرابیه), kurabiye (Turkish), and kourabiedes (Greek: κουραμπιέδες).) are shortbread-type biscuits, usually made with ground almonds. Versions are found in most Arab, Balkan and Ottoman cuisines, with various forms and recipes. They are similar to polvorones from Andalusia.

In the Maghreb and Egypt, they are often served with Libyan tea, Arabic coffee, or Maghrebi mint tea.

== History ==
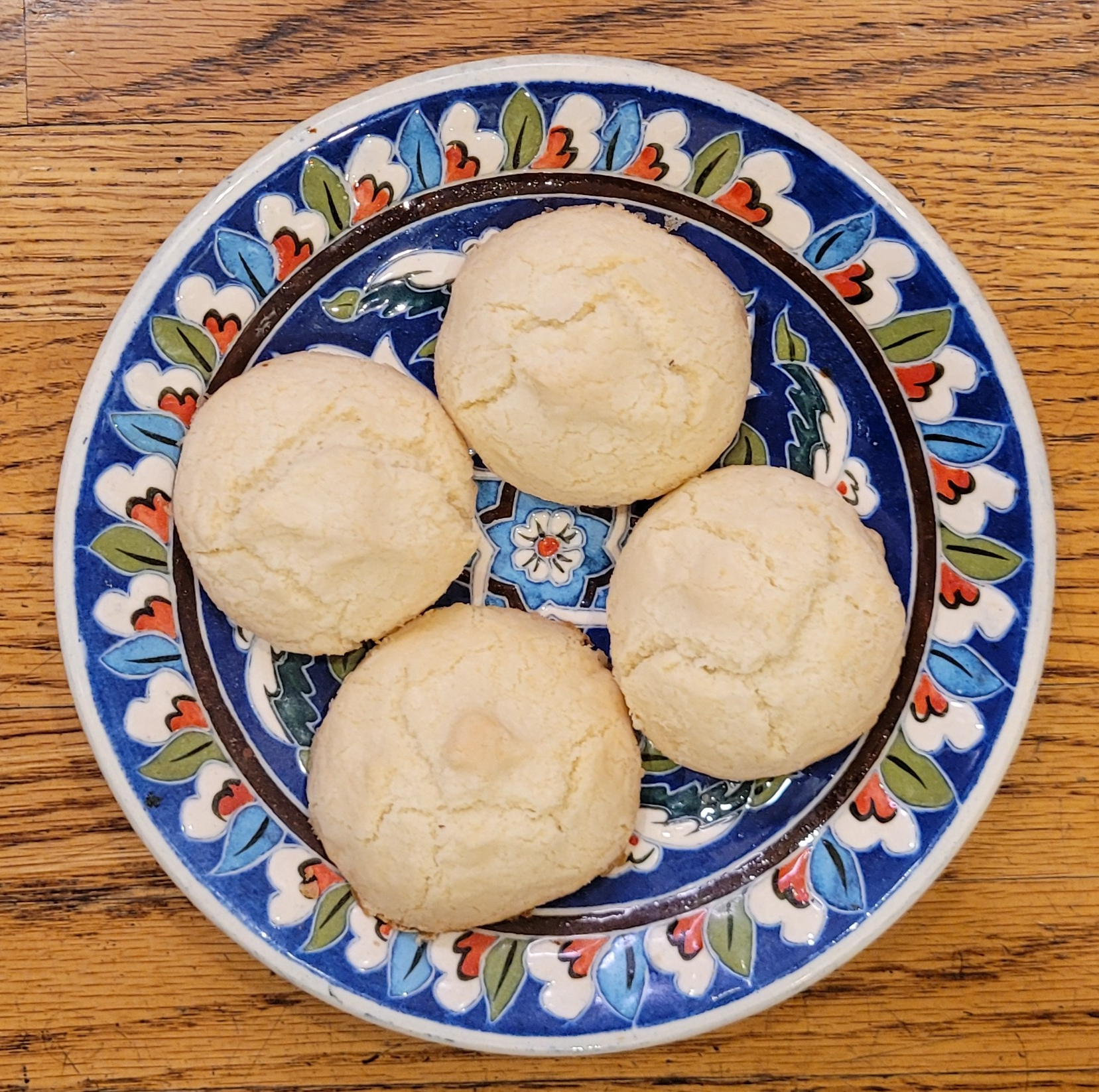
[nuhūd] al-ʿadhārī; Almond cookies based on a 14th-century recipe from Mamluk Egypt. Reproduced based on Nawal Nasrallah's translation of the recipe.

A recipe for a shortbread cookie similar to ghorayebah but without almonds—called in Arabic khushkanānaj gharīb ("exotic cookie")—is given in the earliest known Arab cookbook, the 10th-century Kitab al-Ṭabīḫ. The term kurabiye appears in Ottoman cuisine in the 15th century.

Similar cookies were described in the 14th-century; the cookbook Waṣf al-aṭʿima al-muʿtāda (Arabic: وصف الأطعمة المعتادة, lit. 'The Description of Similar Foods', a collection of recipes compiled by an anonymous author) contained a recipe for a cookie known as [nuhūd] al-ʿadhārī (Arabic: نهود العذاري, lit. 'virgin's breasts', so called because of its shape), which calls for 1 part samneh, 1 part sugar, and 1 part flour (sometimes 1 part ground almonds) to be kneaded together and baked in an oven, with no water being used in the batter. The recipe was repeated in Ibn al-Adim's Kitab al-Wuslah ila l-habib. This cookie has been described as a precursor to modern ghraybeh. Food historian Nawal Nasrallah comments that this cookie may have been popular as the recipe has been copied into several medieval cookbooks.

Proceedings of the 8th International Congress of Orientalists from 1889 described Syrian ghraybe as a type of ma'amoul, shaped into small rings or hexagonal star-like forms, with no nut filling and a high butter content. They also described Egyptian ghurayba as a white, round biscuit-like cookie.

== Etymology ==
There is some debate about the origin of the words. Some give no other origin for the Turkish word kurabiye than Turkish, while others have given Arabic or Persian.

Among others, linguist Sevan Nişanyan gave an Arabic origin in his 2009 book of Turkish etymology, from ġurayb or ğarîb (exotic). However, as of 2019, Nişanyan's online dictionary gives the earliest known recorded use in Turkish as the late 17th century, with an origin from the Persian gulābiya, a cookie made with rose water, from gulāb, related to flowers. He notes that the Syrian Arabic words ġurābiye or ġuraybiye derived from the Turkish. Syrian historian Khayr al-Din al-Asadi attributes a Turkish origin to the word ghraiba used in Syrian Arabic. According to food historian Gil Marks, ghraybeh is of Arabic origin.

== Regional variations ==
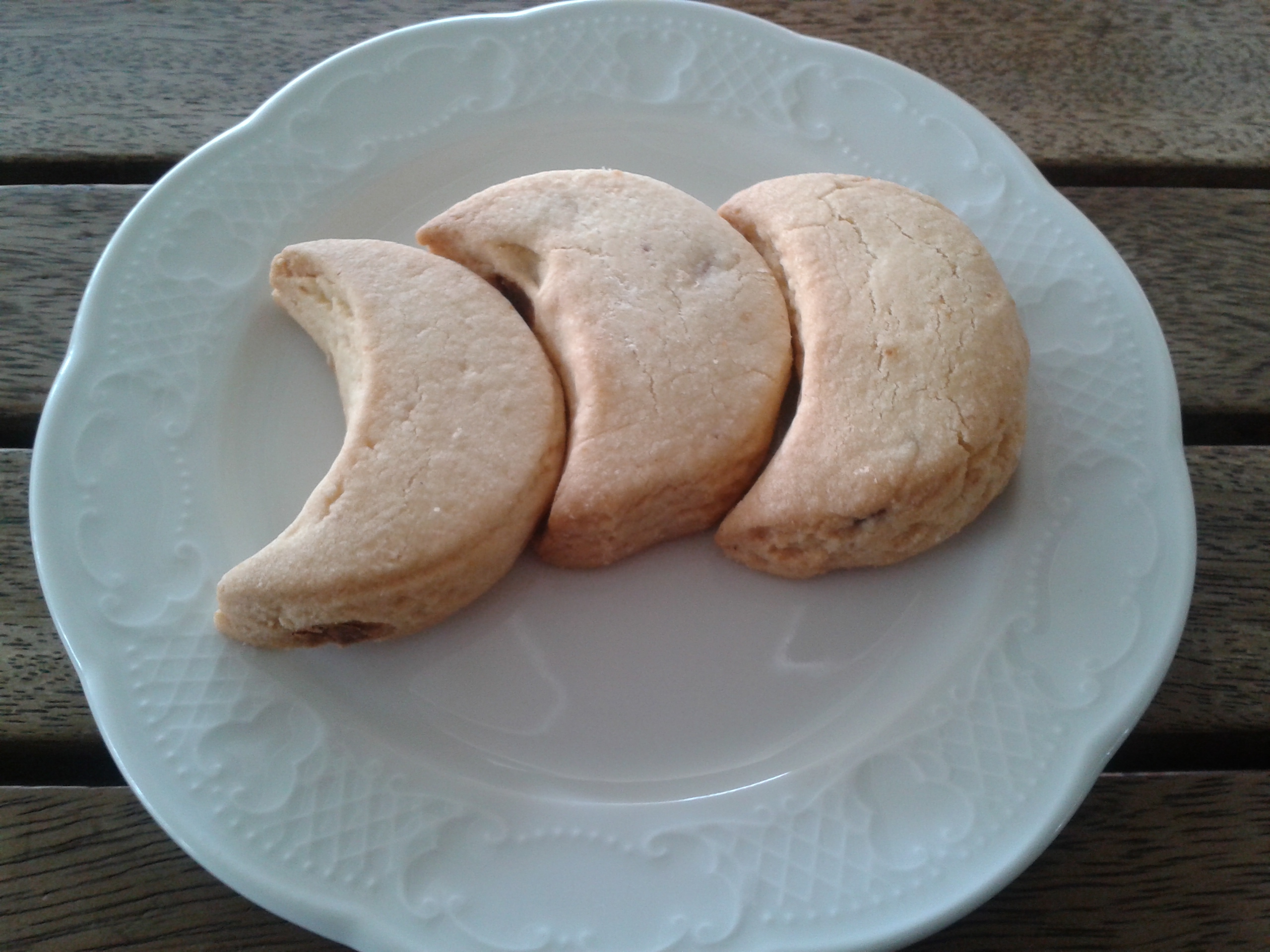
Crescent shaped qurabiya

=== Crimea ===
Crimean Tatars call cookies khurabie (qurabiye, qurabye, къурабье, къурабие).

The Crimean Tatar kurabye has many forms, but generally resembles a rhombus or a combination of two or three rhombuses to form a flower, or it is cut in the shape of a crescent.

Crimean Tatars prepare kurabye as follows: powdered sugar is mixed with ghee, and then flour is added.

The finished khurabye is completely sprinkled with powdered sugar on all sides.

=== Albania ===
In Albania, they are known as kurabie.

=== Algeria ===
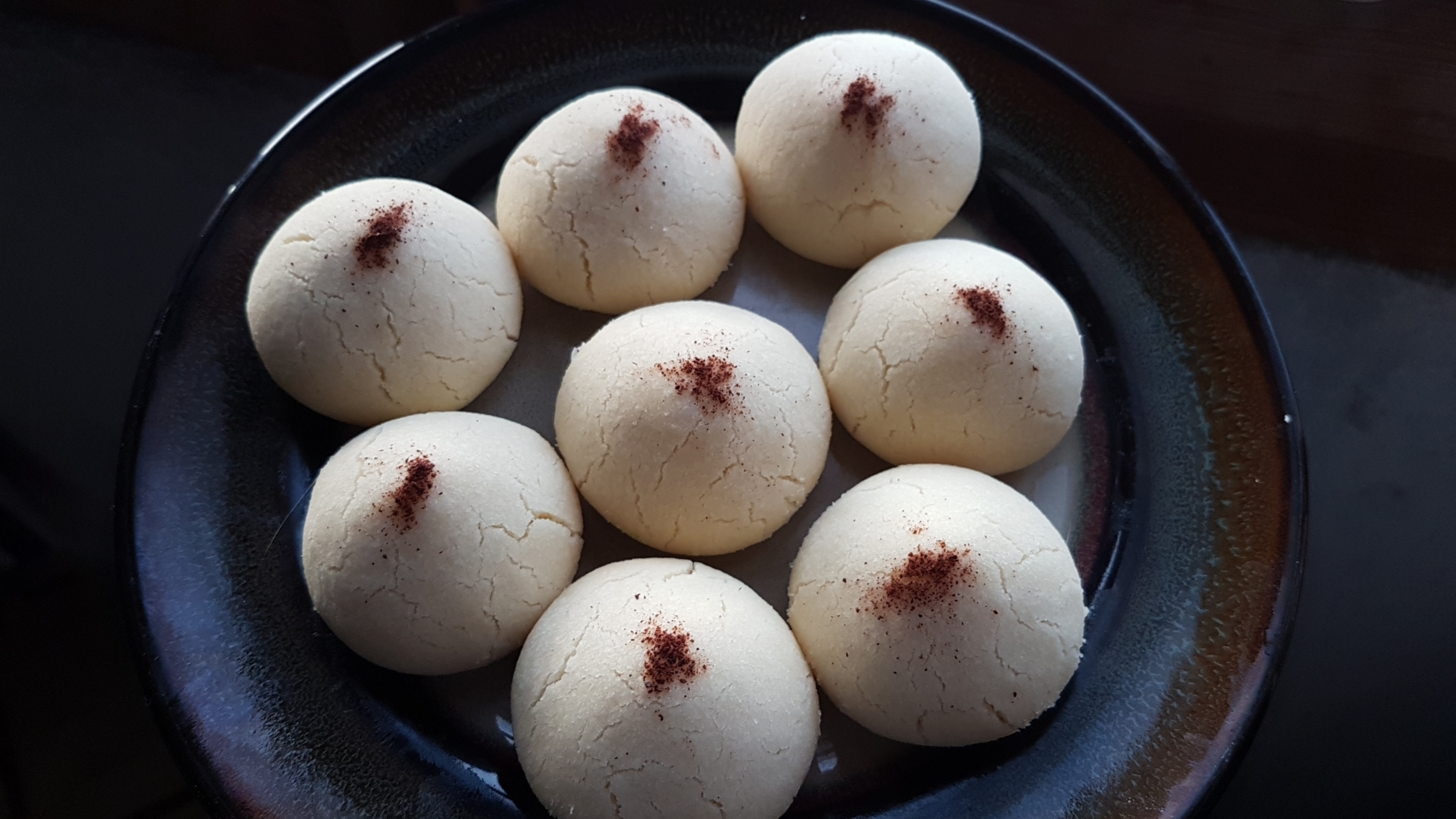
Ghribia biscuits, Algeria

Ghribia (Algerian Arabic: غريبية)

- Ghribia with almonds
- Ghribia with peanuts
- Ghribia with walnuts
- Ghribia with pistachios

=== Armenia ===
Khourabia (Armenian: Ղուրաբիա) is the Armenian version, sometimes referred to in English as an Armenian butter cookie or an Armenian shortbread cookie. Khourabia was traditionally made with these ingredients: butter, sugar, flour, eggs, cinnamon, vanilla, and walnuts. It was usually shaped like a loaf of bread, an ear of wheat, or horseshoe signifying health, wealth, and prosperity. It was mostly eaten during the Easter, Christmas and New Year’s celebrations. Nowadays, some versions add alcohol, like Armenian brandy, to the cookie.

=== Bosnia and Herzegovina ===
Gurabija in Bosnia is characterized by a sugar cube in the middle. In some regions, sugar is replaced by syrup from boiled indigenous fruits. In Tuzla, they are often prepared with apple molasses. Gurabije are typically served with Bosnian coffee.

While the sweet is mostly associated with the Muslim Bosniaks, a variant called Duvanjska gurabija is also made by the Catholic Croats of Bosnia and Herzegovina from the area of Duvno.

=== Bulgaria ===
Kurabii, a Bulgarian variety, is typically shaped into balls and dipped in coarse sugar before baking. It is especially popular during the holiday season. It is often stored in tightly closed containers for later use.

=== Greece and Cyprus ===
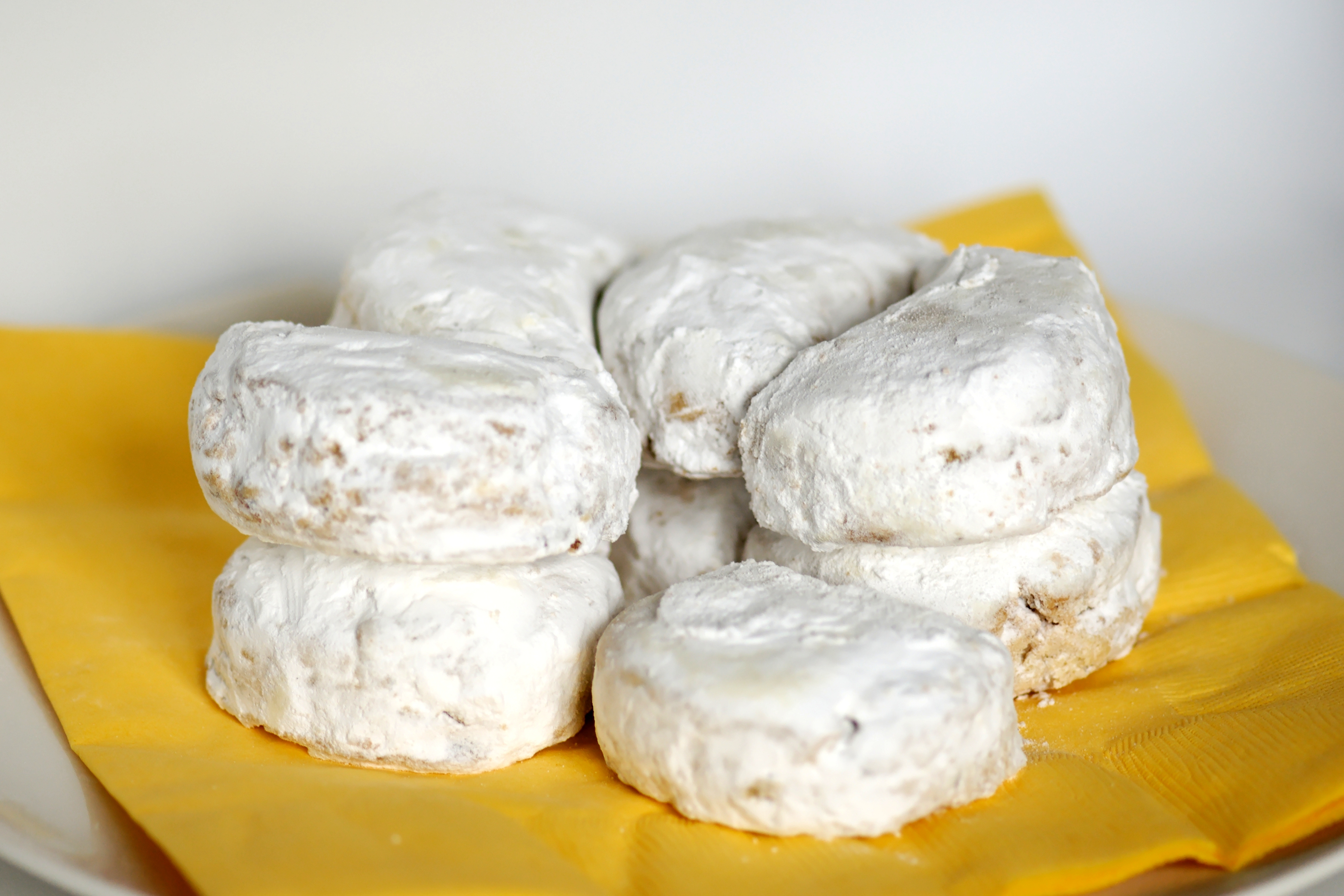
Kourabiedes, Greece

The Greek version, called "kourabiedes" or "kourabiethes" (Greek: κουραμπιέδες; plural of kourabies κουραμπιές), resembles a light shortbread, typically made with almonds. Kourabiedes are sometimes made with brandy, usually Metaxa, for flavouring, though vanilla, mastika or rose water are also popular. In some regions of Greece, Christmas kourabiedes are adorned with a single whole spice clove embedded in each biscuit. Kourabiedes are shaped either into crescents or balls, then baked till slightly golden. They are usually rolled in icing sugar while still hot, forming a rich butter-sugar coating. Kourabiedes are popular for special occasions, such as Christmas or baptisms.

The Greek word "kourabiedes" comes from the Turkish word kurabiye, which is related to ghorayeba, a family of Middle Eastern cookies.

In Cyprus, they are often given as gifts to wedding attendees after the ceremony.

=== Iran ===
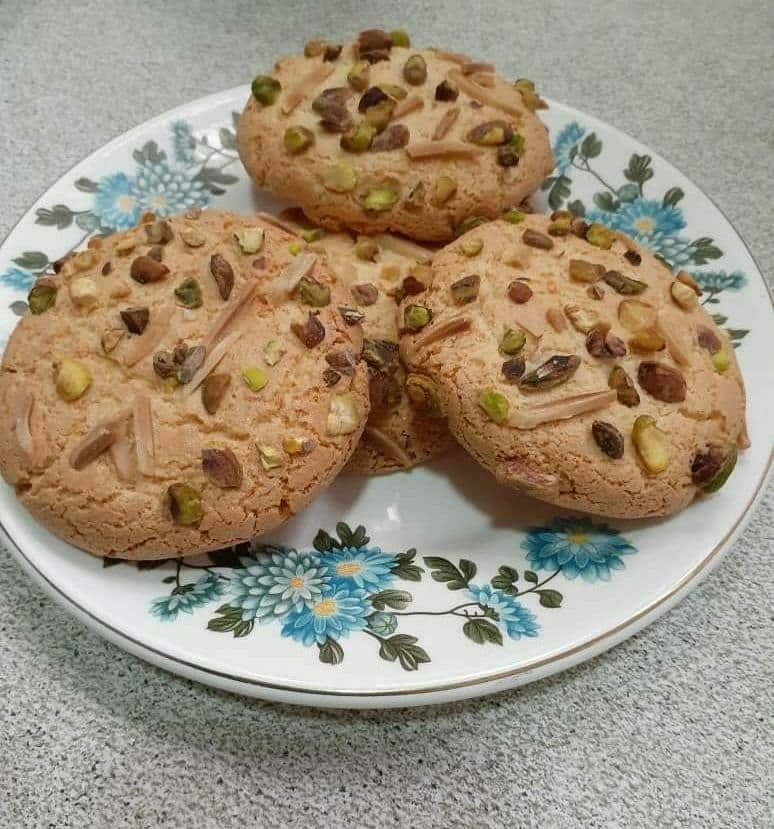
Iranian Azerbaijani qurabiye from Tabriz

In Tabriz, qurabiya are made of almond flour, sugar, egg white, vanilla, margarine and a topping of coarsely crushed pistachio and almond. It is served by itself or with tea, customarily placed on top of the teacup to make it soft before eating.

=== Iraq ===
In Iraqi cuisine, the cookie is called ghraybeh or shakar lamah, and is made with ghee, flour, and sugar, garnished with a single pistachio.

=== Kuwait ===
Variants in Kuwait include:

- Ghoriba with cardamom
- Ghoriba with pistachio
- Ghoriba with saffron

=== Levant ===
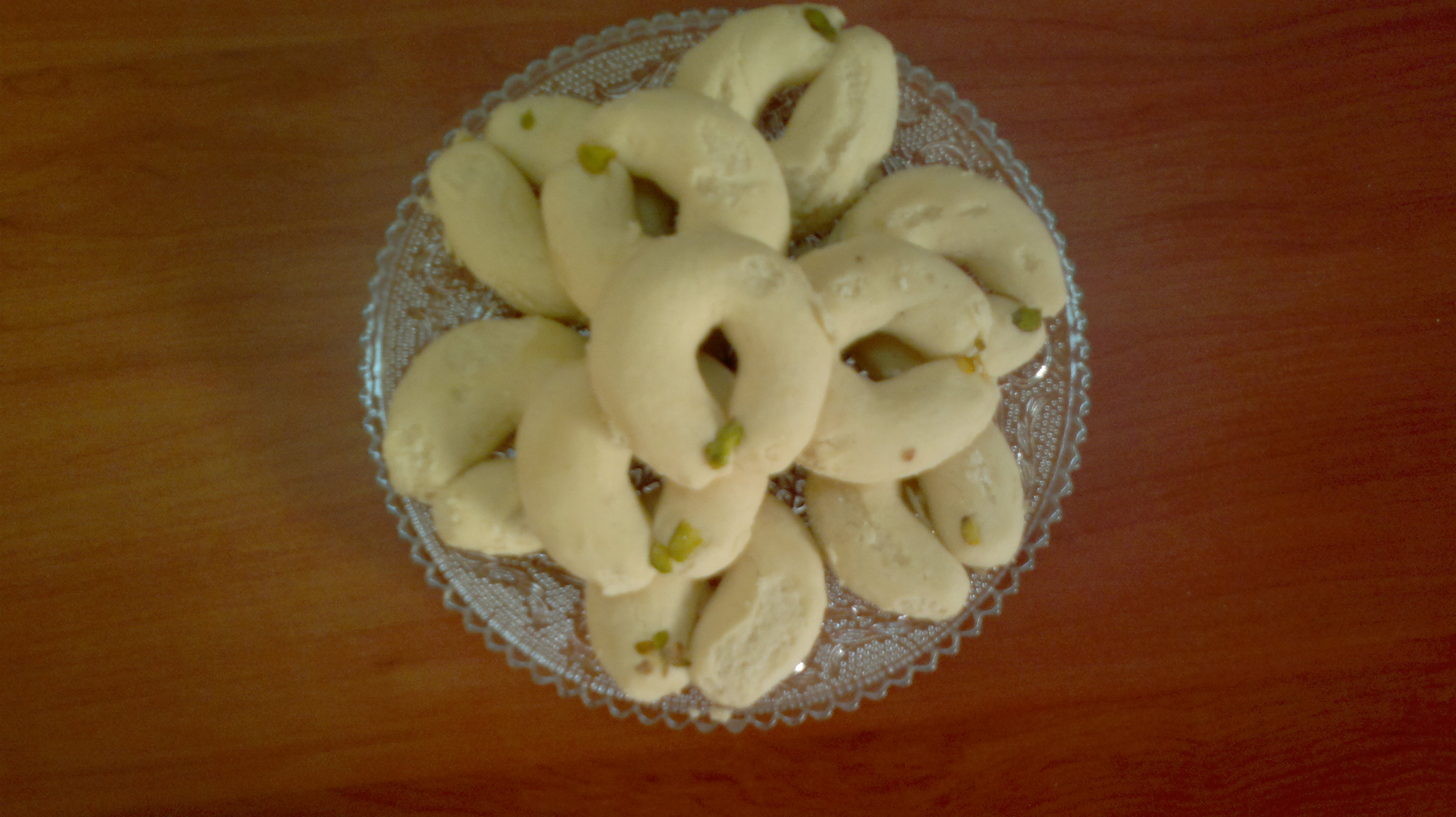
Levantine ghraiba

Levantine ghraybeh is traditionally made for Eid alongside ma'amoul, it is made from flour or semolina flour, sugar, and samneh (clarified butter), and traditionally flavored with rose water or orange flower water, and garnished with a single piece of pistachio. A cookbook published in 1885 by Khalil Khattar Sarkis in Beirut titled Ustadh al-Tabbakhin provided several recipes for ghreybe (غريبة), the recipe called for baking a batter of samneh, sugar, rose water, and semolina.

=== Libya ===
The cookie is known as ghraïba in Libya (Arabic: غريبة). Common Libyan varieties include:

- Ghoriba with peanuts
- Ghoriba with almonds
- Ghoriba with walnuts

=== Morocco ===
Ghoriba (Moroccan Arabic: غْرِيبَة) in Morocco and other parts of the Maghreb, the popular cookies often use semolina instead of white flour, giving a distinctive crunch.

The original ghoriba is made from flour and flavored with lemon or orange zest and cinnamon. This sweet is usually served at parties, accompanied by mint tea or coffee. Ghoriba bahla is a Moroccan variation of ghoriba.

- Mlouwza, made with almonds and sugar flavored with orange flower water
- Ghoriba dyal zite
- Ghoriba mramla

=== Saudi Arabia ===
Ghurēba or ghrēba (Arabic: غريبة) in Saudi Arabia. Variants include:

- Ghurēba with pistachio
- Ghurēba with almonds
- Ghurēba with cardamom

=== Serbia ===
Gurabija has been a part of Serbian cuisine since medieval times. It is typically sweetened with honey. A variety called Hilandarska gurabija is associated with Eastern Orthodox monasteries.

=== Türkiye ===
The word kurabiye is used to refer to a variety of biscuits in Türkiye, not necessarily local ones, although various types of local kurabiye are made, including acıbadem kurabiyesi and un kurabiyesi.

The 1844 Ottoman Turkish cookbook Melceü't-Tabbâhîn provided a recipe for bādèm ghurābiyyèssi (translated as "Almond cake" in the English edition), which describes "macaroon" sized almond "cakes" of ground almonds, eggs, sugar and spices.

Flour kurabiya (Turkish: Un kurabiyesi) is a variety of kurabiye made with flour, typically made into an S-shape. They are typically served alongside tea or Turkish coffee, during social gatherings, holidays, and family visits. It is also commonly seen in Turkish patisseries. Flour kurabiye are associated with Turkish home baking traditions. They are rolled into logs, sliced, and baked until just barely set.

Savory kurabiye, also known as tuzlu kurabiye, are made with similar methods in Turkish cuisine. Savory kurabiye are often flavored with vinegar and topped with sesame or nigella seeds.

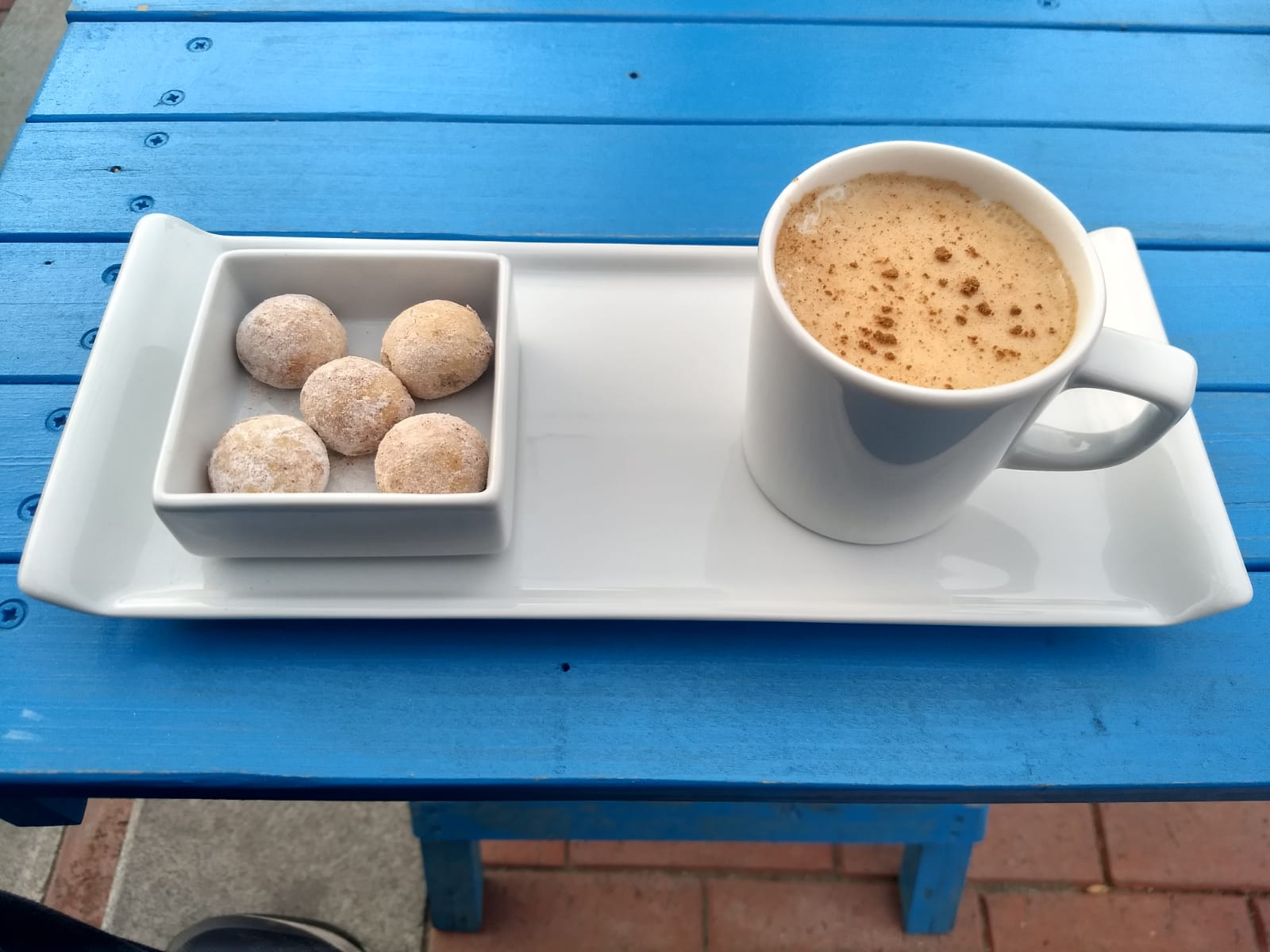
Un kurabiyesi served with salep

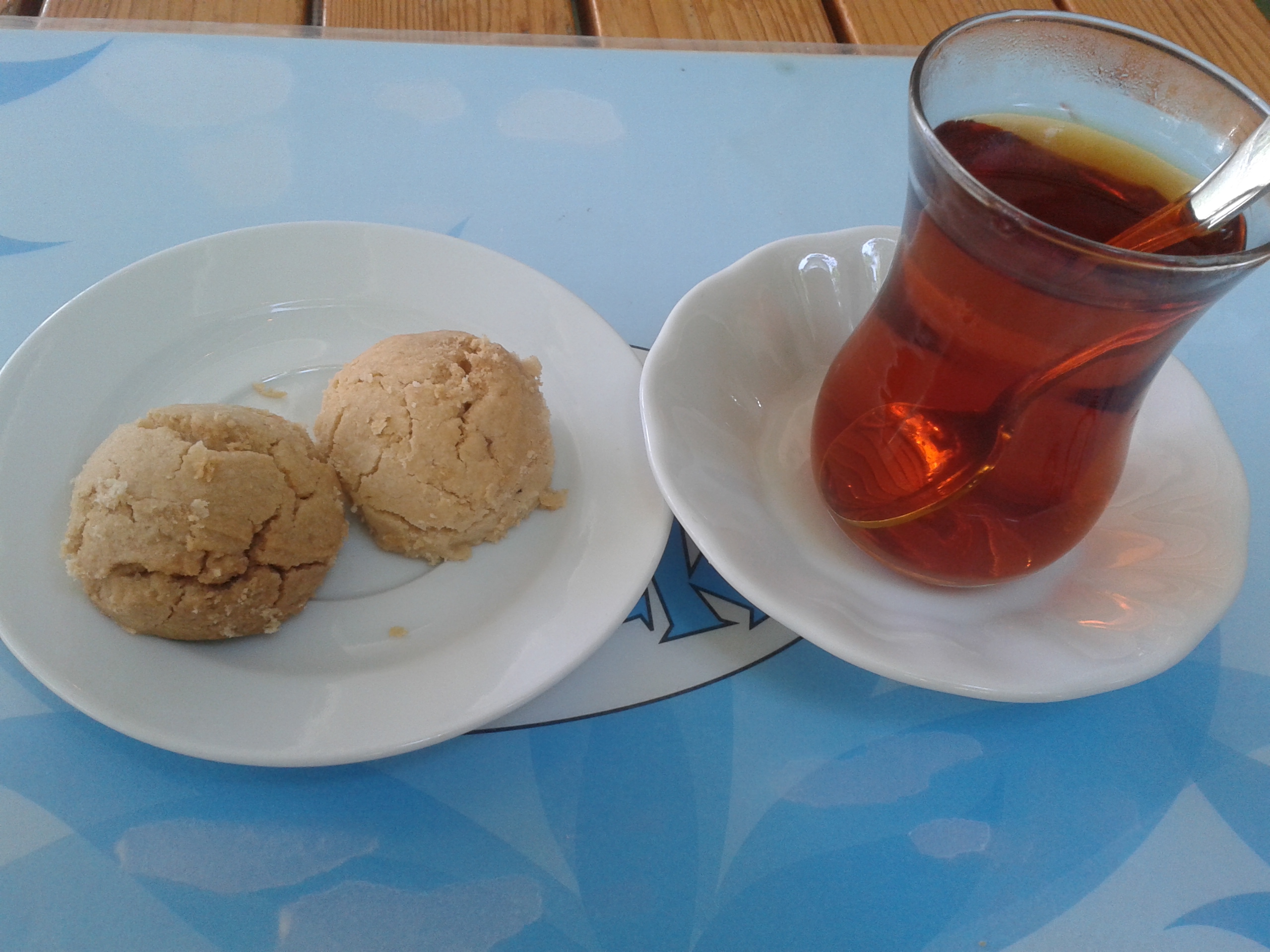
Un kurabiyesi served with tea

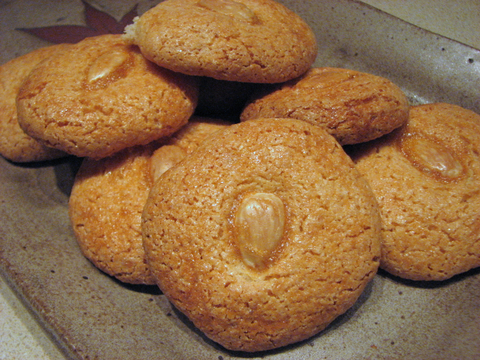
Acıbadem kurabiyesi, Türkiye

=== Tunisia ===
Ghraïba (Tunisian Arabic: غريبة) in Tunisia. Variants include:

- Ghraïba bidha, made with wheat flour
- Ghraïba droô, made with sorghum flour
- Ghraïba homs, made with chickpea flour

== See also ==
- Almond cookie
- Hallongrotta
- Kavala Almond Cookies
- Murabbalı mecidiye
- Nankhatai
- Osmania Biscuit
- Panellets
- Polvorón
- İzmir Bomb Kurabiye
- Bethmännchen
- Gujhia
- Şekerpare
- List of almond dishes
- List of shortbread biscuits and cookies
