= Fig roll =

Snack food

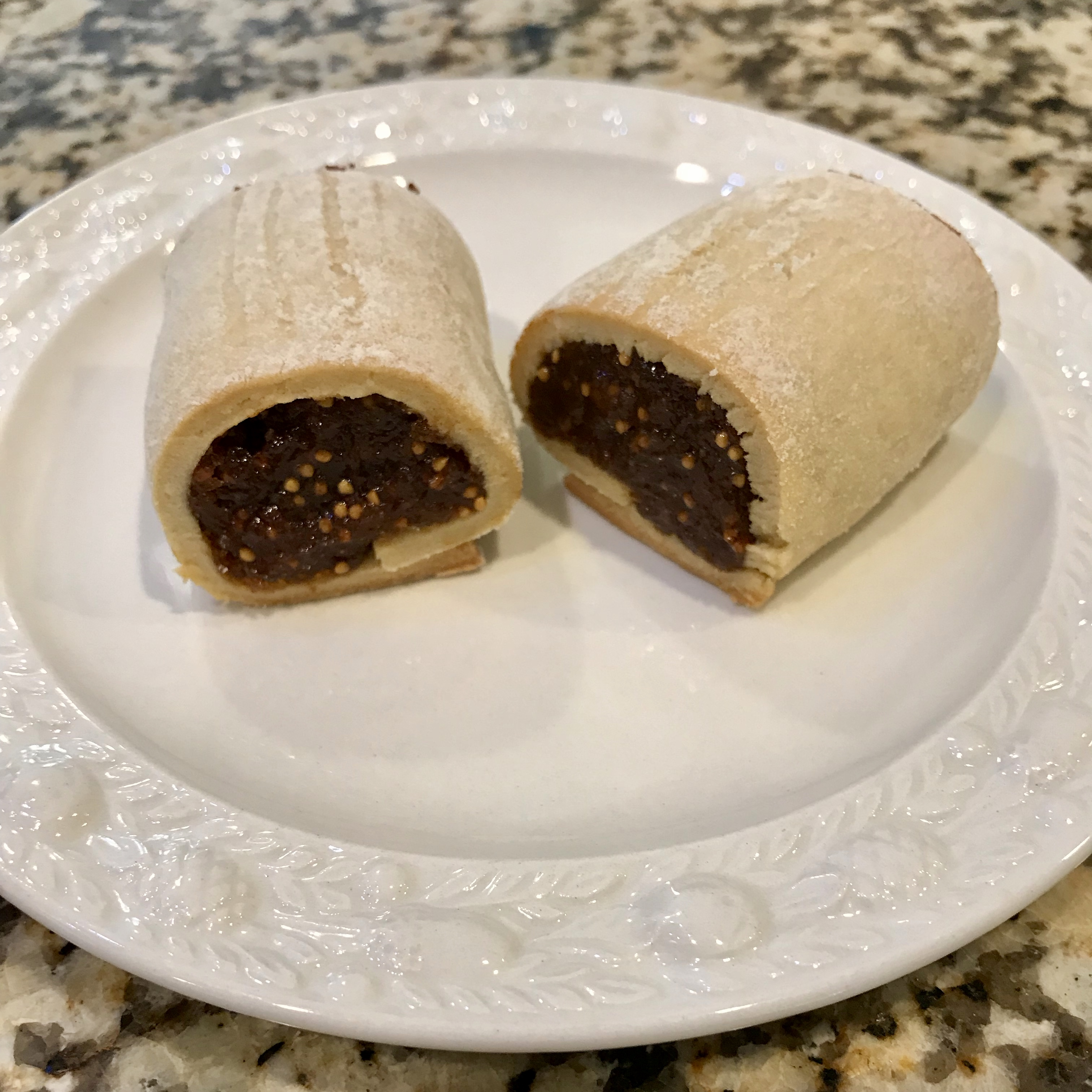
- Homemade fig rolls
- Type: Pastry
- Place of origin: Western Asia
- Main ingredients: Fig paste

The fig roll or fig bar is a biscuit or cookie consisting of a rolled cake or pastry filled with fig paste.

== History ==
Figs have been a popular food since ancient times, originating in the areas of the Mediterranean and Asia Minor.

Early Egyptians may have invented the first fig roll—a simple pastry made with fig paste and a flour-based dough. In the Middle Ages, the Arab physician Ibn Butlan is recorded to have recommended eating figs with biscuits, or sugared bread—an early instance of what could be considered a fig roll.

Fig rolls were popular with British immigrants in the United States in the late 19th century.

== Commercially-produced examples ==
=== Fig Newtons ===
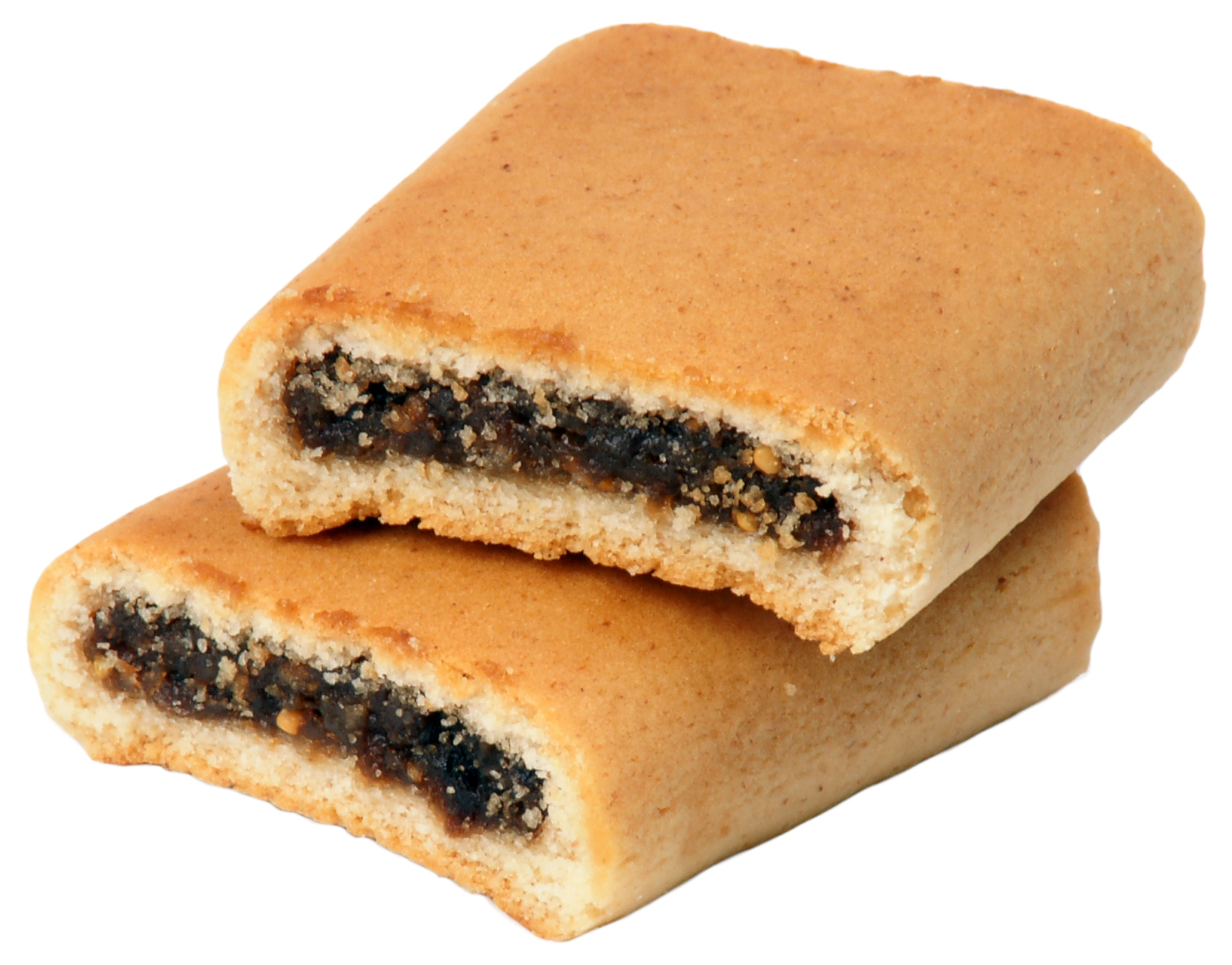
Fig Newtons

Fig Newtons are a popular mass-produced cookie similar to a fig roll. In 1892 James Henry Mitchell, a Florida engineer and inventor, received a patent for a machine that could produce a hollow tube of cookie dough and simultaneously fill it with jam. The machine consisted of two funnels, one inside the other, with the outer funnel creating the dough tube and the inner funnel filling that tube with fig jam.

At the same time, Philadelphia baker and fig lover Charles Roser was developing a recipe for a pastry based on the British homemade fig roll. Roser approached the Cambridgeport, Massachusetts–based Kennedy Biscuit Company, who agreed to take on production and sales.

Kennedy Biscuit Company had recently become associated with the New York Biscuit Company, and after merger to form Nabisco, trademarked the product as the Fig Newton. The cookie was named after the Massachusetts town of Newton. It was one of the first commercially-produced baked goods in the United States.

=== Jacob's and Bolands Fig Rolls ===
Valeo Foods produces two snack foods similar to traditional fig rolls - "Jacob's Fig rolls", which are sold only in Ireland, and "Bolands Fig rolls" (named after Boland's Bakery) which are also sold in the United Kingdom.

Jacob's Fig rolls are produced by the Jacob Fruitfield Food Group. They are the most popular brand of biscuit in Ireland, with sales of 8.3 million packets each year.

== See also ==
- Birnbrot
- Fig cake (fruit)
- List of cookies
- List of pastries
- Makroudh
- Cuccidati
