= Ghantewala =

Confectionery seller

Ghantewala in Chandni Chowk, in Delhi

The Ghantewala Halwai (घंटेवाला हलवाई) in Chandni Chowk in Delhi, established in 1790 CE was one of the oldest halwais (traditional sweet shop) in India.

It has catered to Mughal Emperors, Presidents and Prime Ministers of India, from Nehru to his grandson Rajiv Gandhi. Over the years, it has also remained a popular visitors attraction in Old Delhi area and known for its Sohan Halwa.

In July 2015, the shop closed down due to falling sales and legal issues with the Delhi Pollution Control Committee.

It reopened in Nov 2024.

== History ==
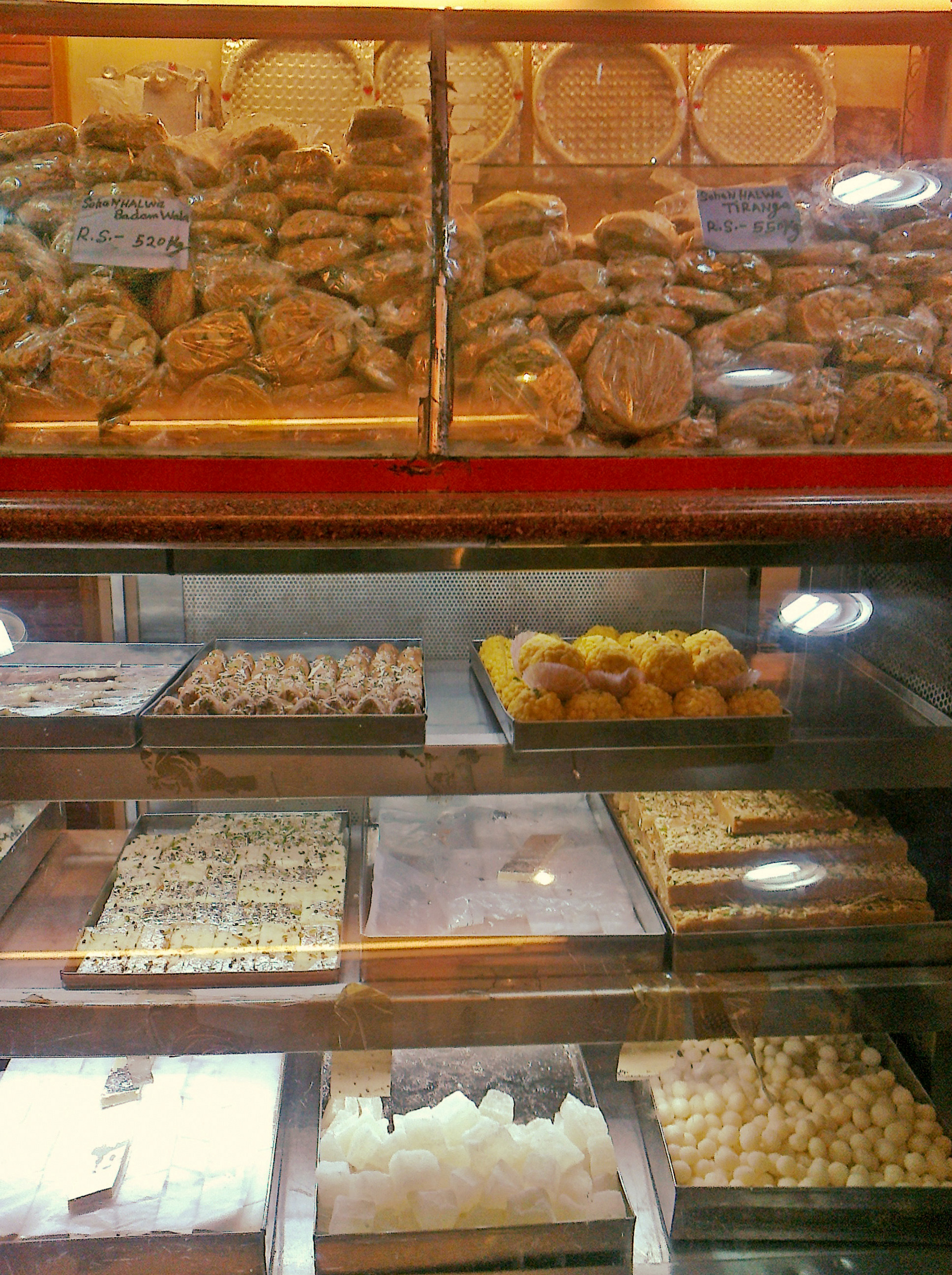
Sohan Halwa (top shelf) and other traditional Indian sweets at Ghantewala in Chandni Chowk

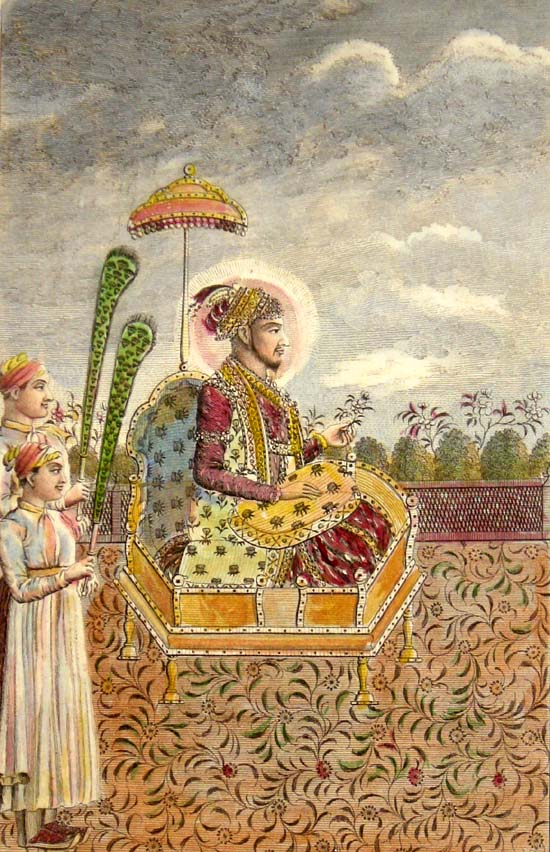
Emperor Shah Alam II, (r. 1759 - 1806) during whose rule the shop was established and got its name

It was founded by Lala Sukh Lal Jain who had arrived in the walled city of Delhi from Amber, India, a few years after Sindhia restored Mughal Emperor Shah Alam II (r. 1759 - 1806). The shop was later run by his descendants for seven generations.

There are a couple of theories about how it got its name "Ghantewala". According to one, it was so named by Mughal Emperor, Shah Alam II himself who asked his servants to get sweets from the ghante ki neeche wali dukaan (Shop below the bell) shop, which in time got shortened to simply Ghantewala. In those days the area was sparsely populated and the Emperor who used to live in the Red Fort could hear the toll of the bell for the school which was located in near the shop.

Another theory about how it was named "Ghantewala" is that the founder, Lala Sukh Lal Jain, used to walk from street to street for selling his sweets while ringing a bell to attract attention. As he grew popular, people started to call him "Ghantewala" - a Hindi language word for the bell-man. Later when he established a shop, he named it "Ghantewala".

Ghantewala's sweets were already famous before the Indian Rebellion of 1857 (Ghadar). The newspaper, 'Dihli Urdu Akhbar' of 23 August 1857 reported about the rebels from other regions become softened after they discovered the luxuries of the royal capital:

..The moment they have a round of Chandni Chowk ... enjoy the sweetmeats of Ghantawala, they lose all urge to fight and kill the enemy.

The Lala began by selling Mishri Mawa, a Rajasthani specialty. In 2015, they had around 40 to 50 different varieties of sweets that they kept changing according to the season or festivals, according to Sushant Jain, who is a seventh generation descendant. The family split a few decades ago and another branch has a shop nearby the fountain. One shop is closed while another shop has changed its name as Ghantewala Confectioners run by a descendant, Nirmal Jain. It is situated close to the Gali Paranthe Wali also in Chandni Chowk.

== Products ==
According to the owner Sushant Jain, the 'Sohan Halwa' was a favourite of patrons from as far away as the Gulf. Pista Burfi and perennial favourite like 'motichoor ki ladoo', Kalakand, Karachi halwa and snacks like makkan choora were also popular among the patrons. Before closing down, it used to sell traditional Indian snacks, like namkeen, samosa, kachori etc., besides festive sweets like gujiyas around Holi.

== In popular culture ==
When film producer B.R. Chopra made his comedy Hindi film Chandni Chowk (1954), he made sure that a replica of the shop is included in his set. He said: "Chandni Chowk without Ghantewala? Unthinkable." Near the end of the movie, the dramatic finale occurs right in front of Ghantewala counter, with a sign in English and Urdu proclaiming the association of the shop with the Mughal emperors.

== Closing ==
It was shut down in July 2015. There was widespread reaction to the closing. Indian Express stated: "Ghantewala, an over 200-year-old sweet shop in Old Delhi’s bustling Chandni Chowk market has finally downed its shutters, evoking shock and a sense of loss among food connosseirs, sweet lovers and other visitors." The Hindu wrote: "The scene outside and the disbelief on faces of those watching display units being sold as scrap even as they asked around about what had happened was reminiscent of a funeral service. For heritage lovers as well as fans of the shop, it was the death of one of the icons of the city — a living reminder of the past that still had a connect with the present generation."

It was attributed to a change in the tastes (chocolate sales doubled to $857 million between 2008 and 2011) and legal and licensing issues. The 39-year-old Sushant Jain, the seventh generation descendant of Lala Sukh Lal Jain, lamented: "I know I can't do it. This system has defeated me. I had to wind up Ghantewala. It was heartbreaking for my family. We cried the whole day. If anyone wants to take the franchise of Ghantewala, I am open to the idea". He further explained: "Our shop was sealed in 2000. I have been going to court hearings twice a month since then. It's been 15 years. The Delhi Pollution Control Committee wants us to move our workshop from our ancestral house to elsewhere. I don't have the financial resources or the strength to do it." The present generation could not capitalise the brand value which has been generated both offline and online. BBC made a documentary on the shop.

== See also ==
- Punjabi Chandu Halwai Karachiwala, Mumbai
- K.C. Das Grandsons, Kolkata
- Kesar Da Dhaba, Amritsar
- Badkul Mishtan Bhandar, Japalpur
