= Kleicha =

Middle Eastern cookie

Kleicha (ܟܠܫ̮ܵܐ، كليجة، کادە، کلوچه، کولیچە)
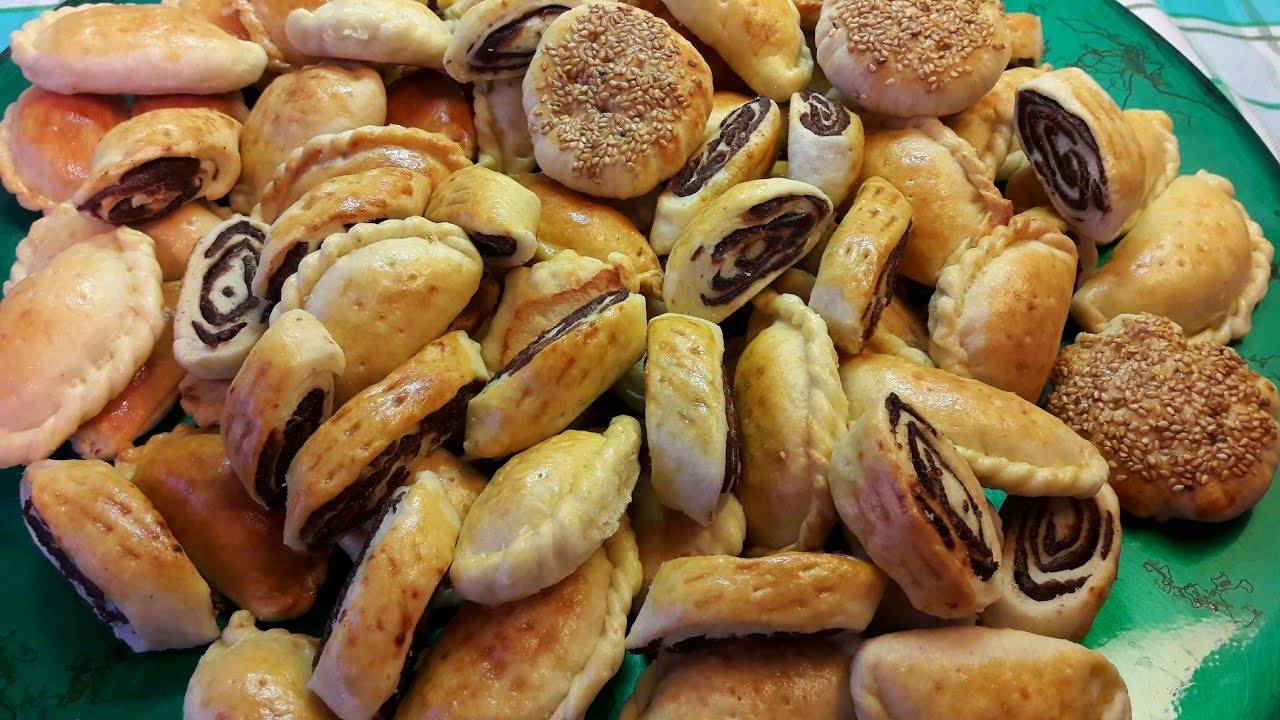
- Iraqi kleicha
- Type: Cookie
- Place of origin: Iraq (Iraq)
- Region or state: Iraq, Saudi Arabia, Najd
- Created by: Sumerians
- Main ingredients: Dough, nuts, dates, and sesame seeds
- Variations: Saudi Kleicha, Koloocheh

Kleicha (Persian: کلوچه, romanized: koluche; North Mesopotamian Arabic: كليچة, romanized: klēči, Mesopotamian Arabic: كليچة, romanized: kilēča; Najdi Arabic: كليجة, romanized: k(i)lēja; Syriac: ܟܠܫ̮ܵܐ, romanized: kleča; Kurmanji Kurdish: kade; Sorani Kurdish: کادە, romanized: kāda; Turkish: kiliçe) is a type of Middle Eastern cookie.

Kleicha comes in several traditional shapes and fillings. The most popular are the ones filled with dates (kleichat tamur). There are also sweet discs (khfefiyyat), as well as half moons filled with nuts, sugar and/or desiccated coconut (kleichat joz). They are usually flavoured with cardamom and sometimes rose water, and glazed with egg wash, which may sometimes be scented and coloured with saffron. Unlike ma'amoul, kleicha typically does not contain semolina.

Muslims make kleicha for Eid al-Fitr and Eid al-Adha and also for their celebrations, weddings or special ceremonies and they are stuffed with many different fillings like dates, pistachios, walnuts, coconuts, dried figs, sesame seeds or Turkish delight. While Iraqi Jews make it for Hanukkah.

Assyrians bake kilecheh on Eeda Gura, Easter, and Eeda Sura, Christmas, on which they are usually stuffed with dates and served with tea.

== Etymology ==
From Middle Persian (kwlʾck' /kulāčag/, lit. 'small, round bun'). Historically, kleicha may be traced back to the ancient Sumerian ‘qullupu'.

== Origin ==
The origins of kleicha can be traced back to ancient Mesopotamia, where Sumerians would prepare this cookie to celebrate the New Year and Ishtar, one of the more prominent goddesses in ancient Sumerian mythology. Spring represented rebirth and renewal, which coincided with Ishtar's power of fertility. To honor the goddess, ancient Sumerians would bake qullupu, the kleicha's ancestor. These cookies were shaped to resemble a full or crescent moon that symbolized the arrival of Spring, which was often marked by the first full moon in late March or early April.

A recipe for kleija cookies can be found in a 13-Century Arabic cookbook by Ibn al-Adim.

== Varieties ==
=== Syria ===
Spiced variations of kleija with different fillings are made in some Syrian cities, like Deir ez-Zor and Al-Hasakah.

=== Saudi Arabia ===
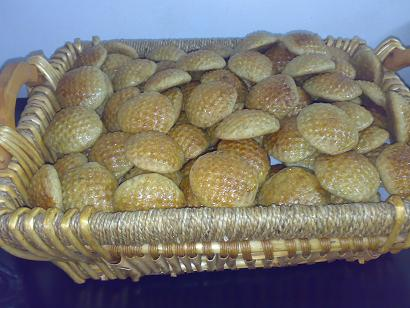
Klēja from Qassim

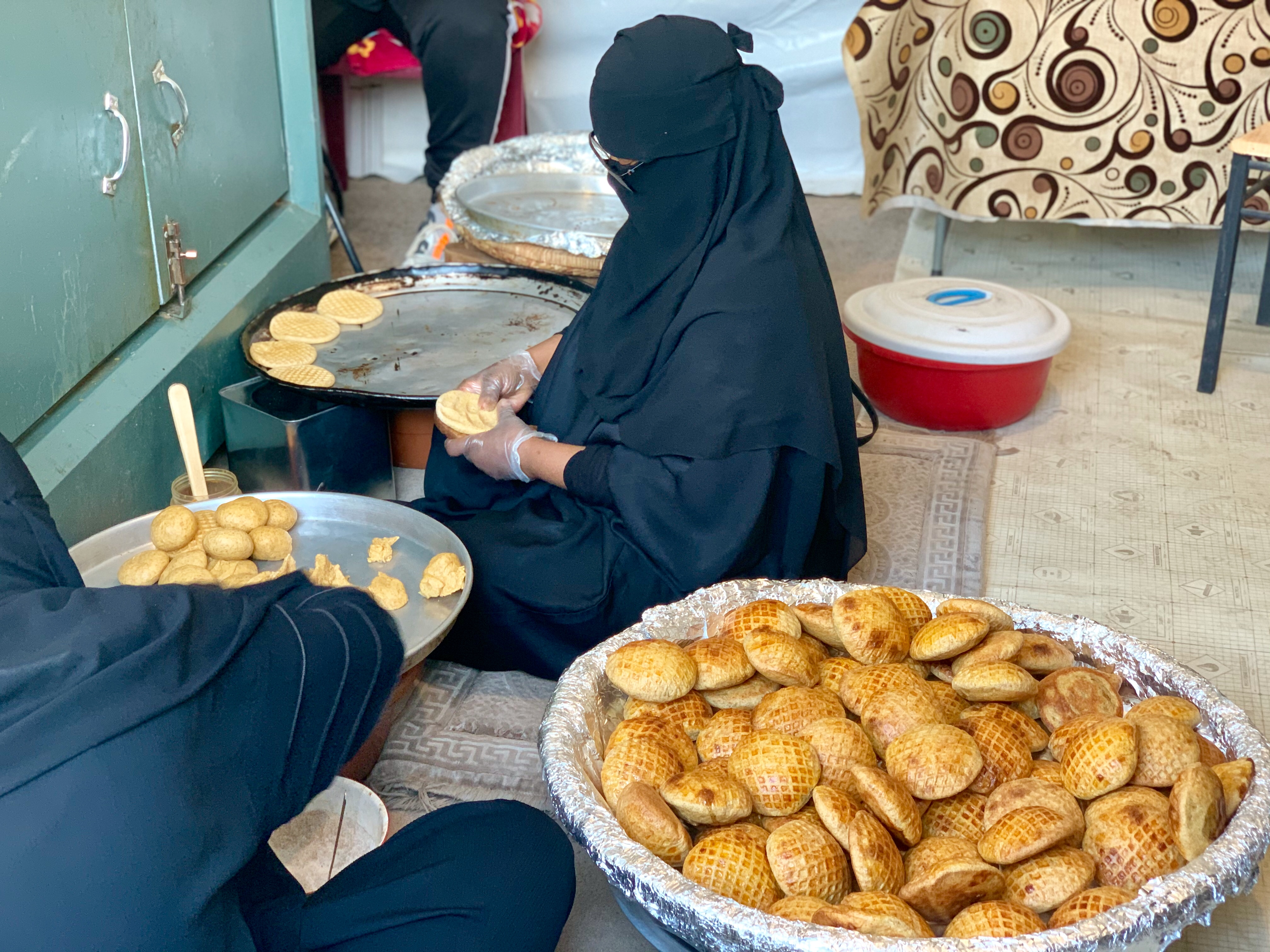
Klēja being made in Qassim

Although the name is somewhat similar, Klēja in the Najd region of Saudi Arabia (Qassim and Haʼil provinces) differs in taste, shape and ingredients from Iraqi kleicha. It is made with yeasted dough that has been enriched with spices, such as cardamom and cinnamon, and filled with a mixture of either date, sugar, or honey molasses and spices, typically cardamom, but also black dried lime, cinnamon, and ginger.

Kleija was featured in the 2024 edition of "Breads of the Creative Cities", a project by UNESCO's Creative Cities Network.

== See also ==
- Makroudh
- Ma'amoul
- Mooncake
- Mesopotamian cuisine
- Bakpia pathok
- Bundevara
- Birnbrot
- Kahk
- Knish
- Klobásník
- Koloocheh
- Kolompeh
- Kulich (bread)
- Fig roll
- Anpan
- Hwangnam-ppang
- Saudi Arabian cuisine
- Egg yolk pastry
- Dutch letter
