= Punjabi Chandu Halwai Karachiwala =

Confectionery shop in Mumbai

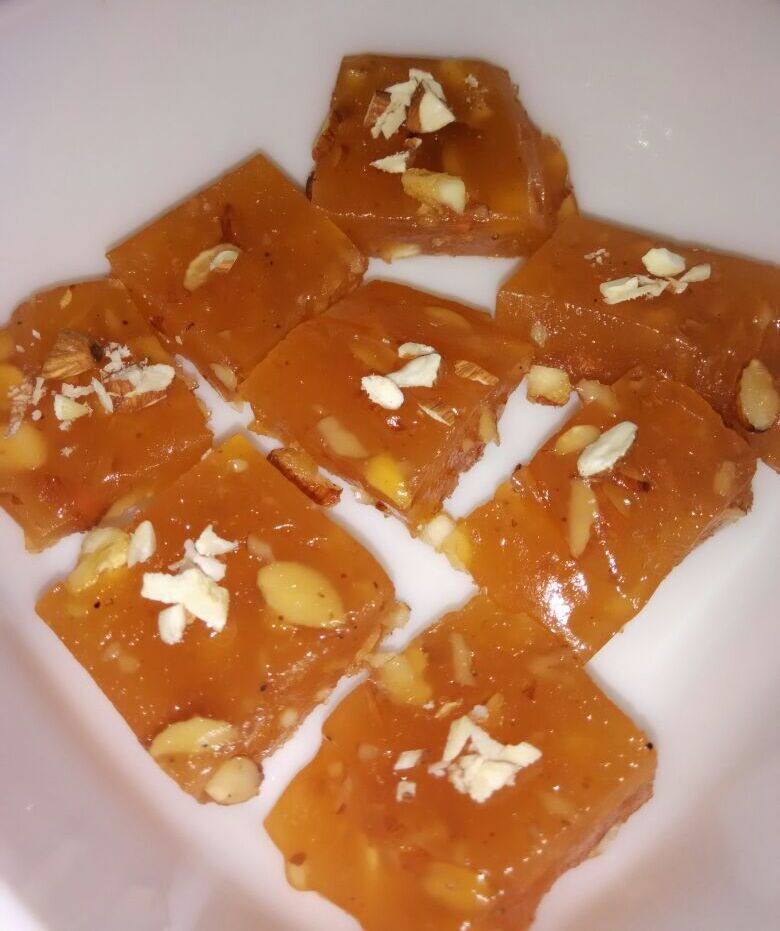
Bombay halwa (corn flour halwa)

Punjabi Chandu Halwai Karachiwala is a halwai shop in Mumbai. It was originally established in Karachi in 1896 by Chandulal Bahl, a Punjabi Khatri.

Its owners moved to Mumbai after the partition of India. Karachi halwa, also known as Bombay halwa, was popularized by halwais moving from Karachi.

While many preparations remain traditional, it occasionally develop new sweets.

== Feeding of refugees ==
Sri Prakasa, the first High Commissioner to Pakistan, recalled an incident during the days of partition, when he faced the problem of feeding the refugees in Karachi in 1947. He was able to get the food supplies from Chandu Halwai, which refused to take the payment.

== See also ==
- Kesar Da Dhaba
- Ghantewala
- Badkul
- K.C. Das Grandsons
