= Ma'amoul =

Cookie with sweet filling

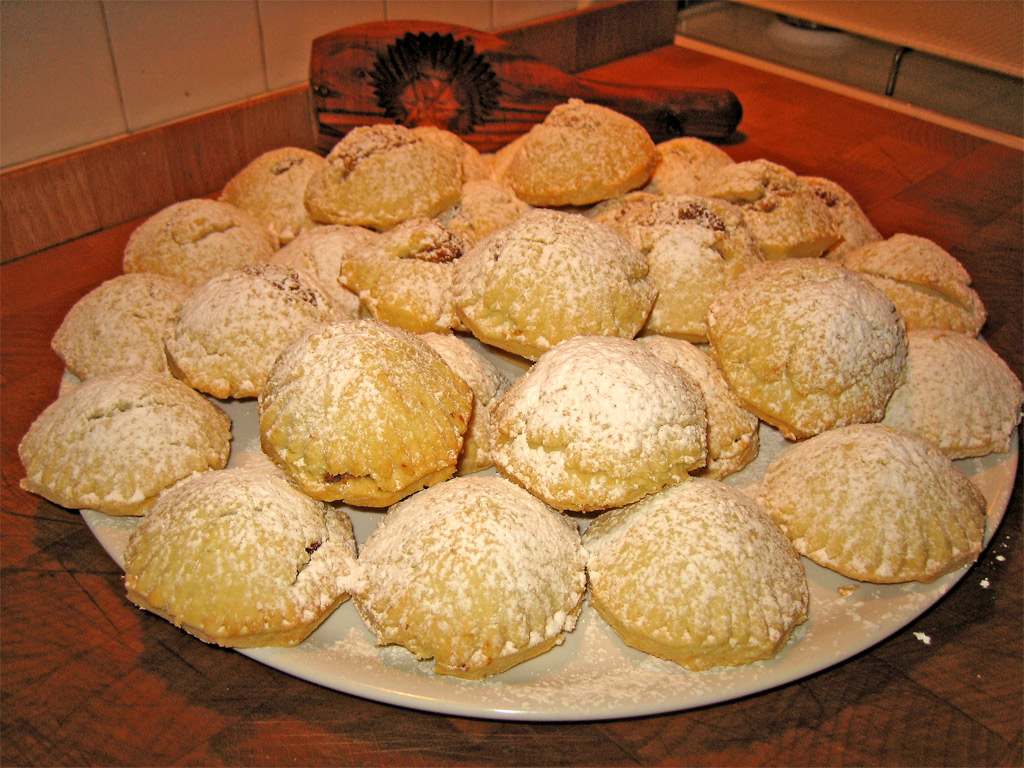
- Ma'amoul, dusted with powdered sugar, a mould for making ma'amoul can be seen in the background
- Type: Cookie
- Course: Dessert
- Place of origin: Levant
- Region or state: Middle East
- Main ingredients: Semolina, dates, pistachios or walnuts

Ma'amoul (Arabic: معمول maʿmūl [mæʕˈmuːl]) is a filled cookie made with semolina flour and butter. Originating in the Arab world, the filling can be made with dried fruits like figs, dates, or nuts such as pistachios, walnuts, and occasionally almonds or cheese.

Ma'amoul is usually made during the holidays of Easter, and a few days before Eid (then stored to be served with Arab coffee and chocolate to guests who come during the holiday). It is popular throughout the Arab world.

They may be in the shape of balls, domed or flattened cookies. They can either be decorated by hand or be made in special wooden moulds called tabe. Different moulds can denote different fillings.

== Preparation ==
The dough is prepared by mixing semolina and butter together and leaving the batter to rest so that the semolina absorbs the butter, before being used to enclose the filling, the filled ma'amoul is then squeezed into a mold then baked.

== History ==
Levantine maʿamoul has been linked by food historians to kleicha, a Mesopotamian date-filled cookie attested since at least the medieval period, and to kahk, an ancient Egyptian date-filled cookie.

=== Ottoman period ===
According to food historian Priscilla Mary Işın, a pastry similar to karabij called külünbe was described by Evliya Çelebi in the 17th century, it was a nut-filled semolina cookie.

=== 19th century ===
Ma'amoul appears in several 19th century texts; an 1895 Egyptian Arabic-English dictionary by author Socrates Spiro described "maʿmûl" as "a kind of Syrian cake"; the name was translated as "made, manufactured". Late 19th-century proceedings by the International Congress of Orientalists described both ma'amoul and karabij with natef; ma'amoul was described as a small, round, nut-filled or plain semolina flour cookie with a decorated top, and karabij was described as a long, finger-shaped, nut-filled cookie served with or without natef cream. A recipe for walnut-filled ma'amoul appeared in the 1885 Beirut cookbook Ustadh al-Tabbakhin. In 1883, Swedish Orientalist Carlo Landberg described ornamented, date-filled ('ajwa) ma'amoul being made for Eid al-Adha in Syria.

== Variations ==
The cookies can be filled with nuts (commonly used nuts are pistachios, almonds or walnuts) or dried fruits (such as figs), most commonly orange-scented date paste. A variety of spices are also added to the dough, like mastic (Arabic gum) and mahleb, other common traditional flavorings include rose water.

In Arabian Gulf cuisine, ma'amoul are traditionally flavored with saffron and cardamom, and sometimes made with white flour.

In Turkey, maamouls are referred to as kömbe and the filling usually consists of crushed walnuts, ginger and cinnamon.

In Latakia, Syria, cheese is a traditional filling.

=== Ma'amoul maad ===
Ma'amoul maad (Arabic: معمول مد) is a variation of ma'amoul where instead of shaping the dough into individual cookies, it is shaped into a 3-layer cake, with the semolina dough at the bottom layer, the filling in the second layer, and more semolina dough at the top layer. It is popular in Lebanon, where qishta is a popular filling besides nuts and dates.

A similar dessert called dahdah (Arabic: دحدح, romanized: daḥdaḥ, lit. 'plump') is made in Palestine, specifically in Hebron.

=== Karabij ===
Karabij Halab (Arabic: كرابيج حلب, lit. 'whips of Aleppo') are a stuffed semolina cookie originating from Aleppo, Syria, they are typically stuffed with pistachios, and are served with natef, a sort of marshmallow creme,. They are a variation of ma'amoul, and are also popular in Lebanon.

Kerebiç is Turkish a variation of karabij. It is a semolina cookie that stuffed with nuts and served with soapwort cream, it is popular in Mersin during Ramadan. It is a registered patent under the Turkish Patent and Trademark Office as a geographical indication, according to the patent office, it was popularized by Arab confectioners in the 1940s.

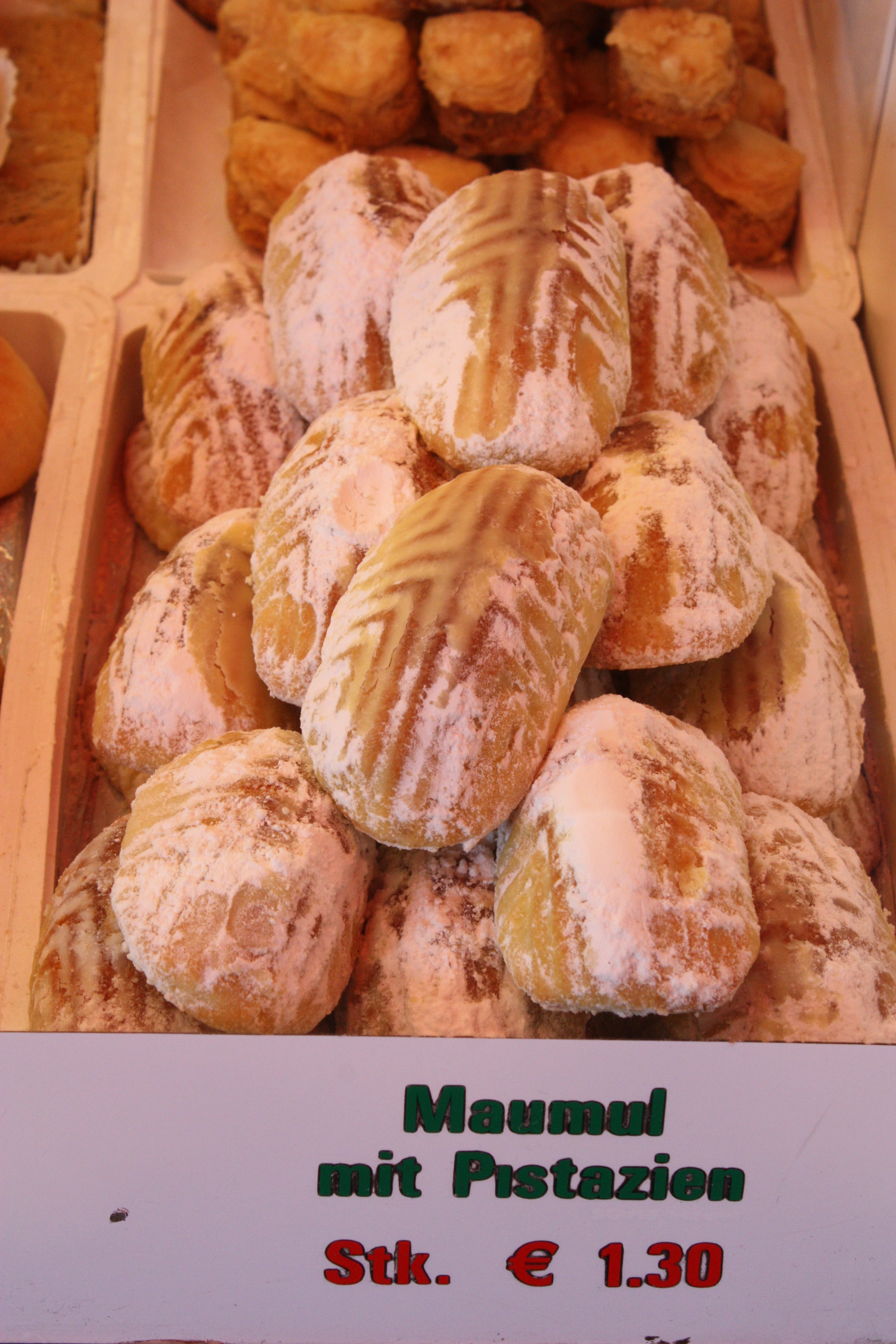
Maamoul at Vienna Naschmarkt

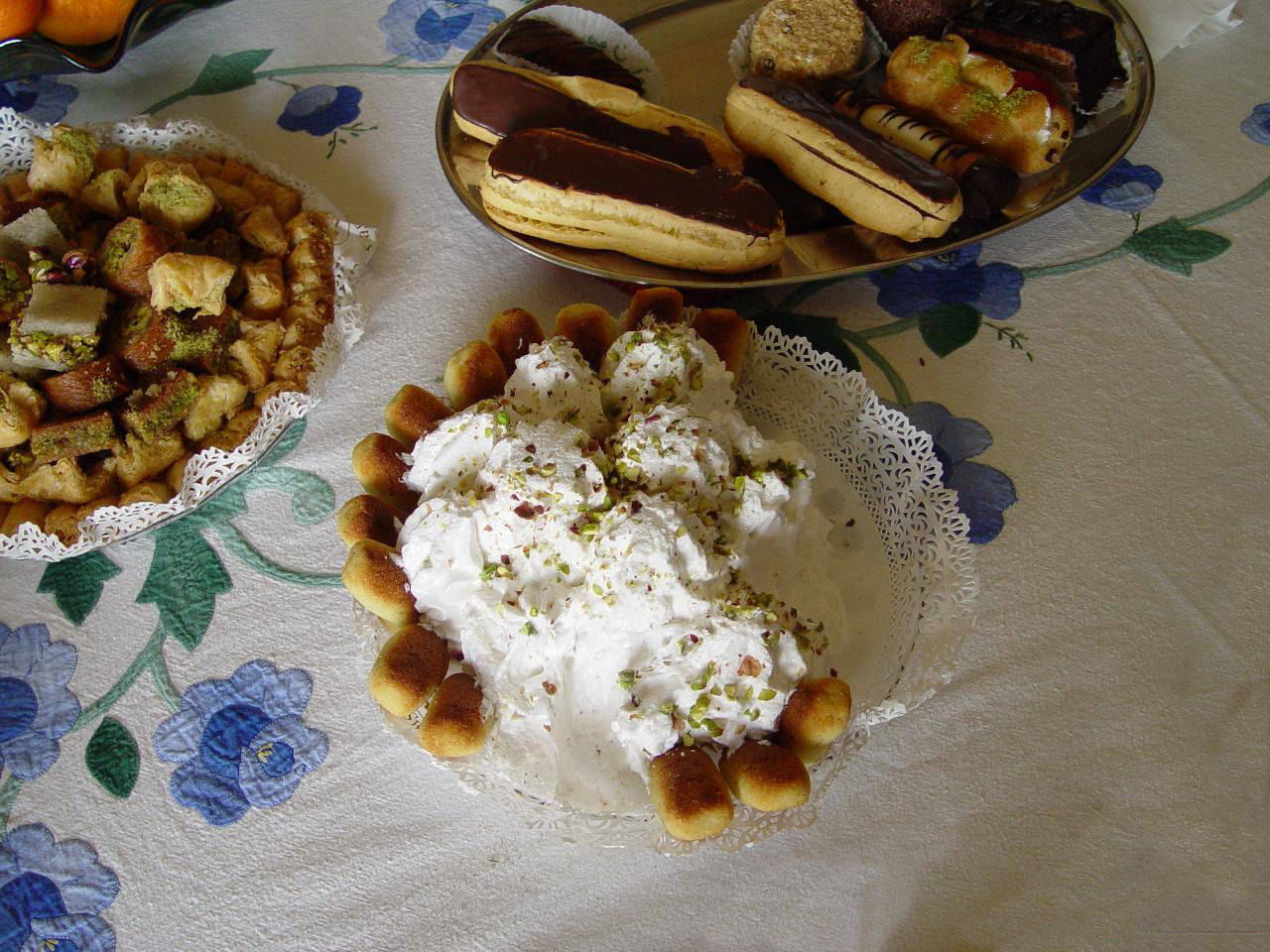
Lebanese karabij with cream (center)

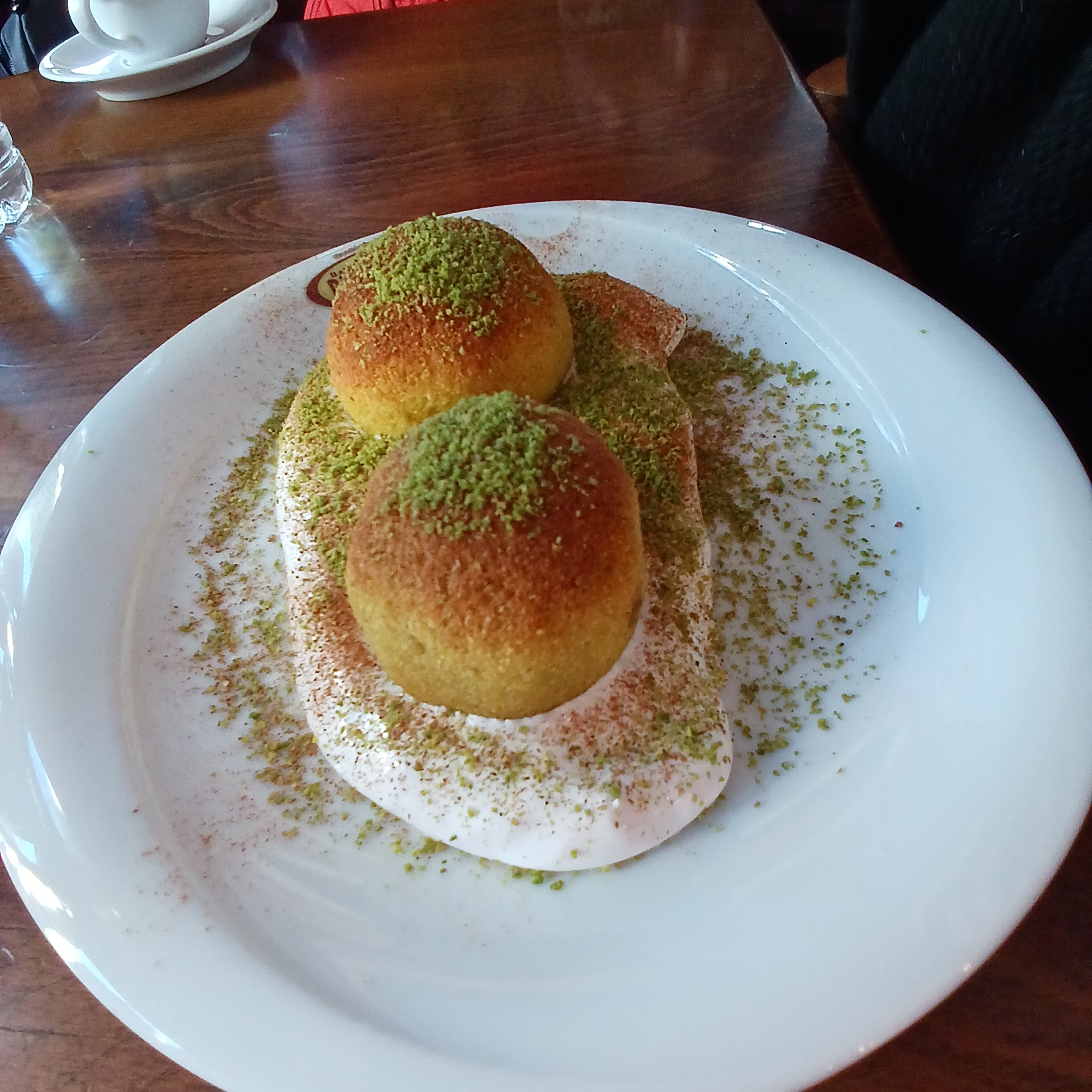
Turkish Kerebiç in Mersin

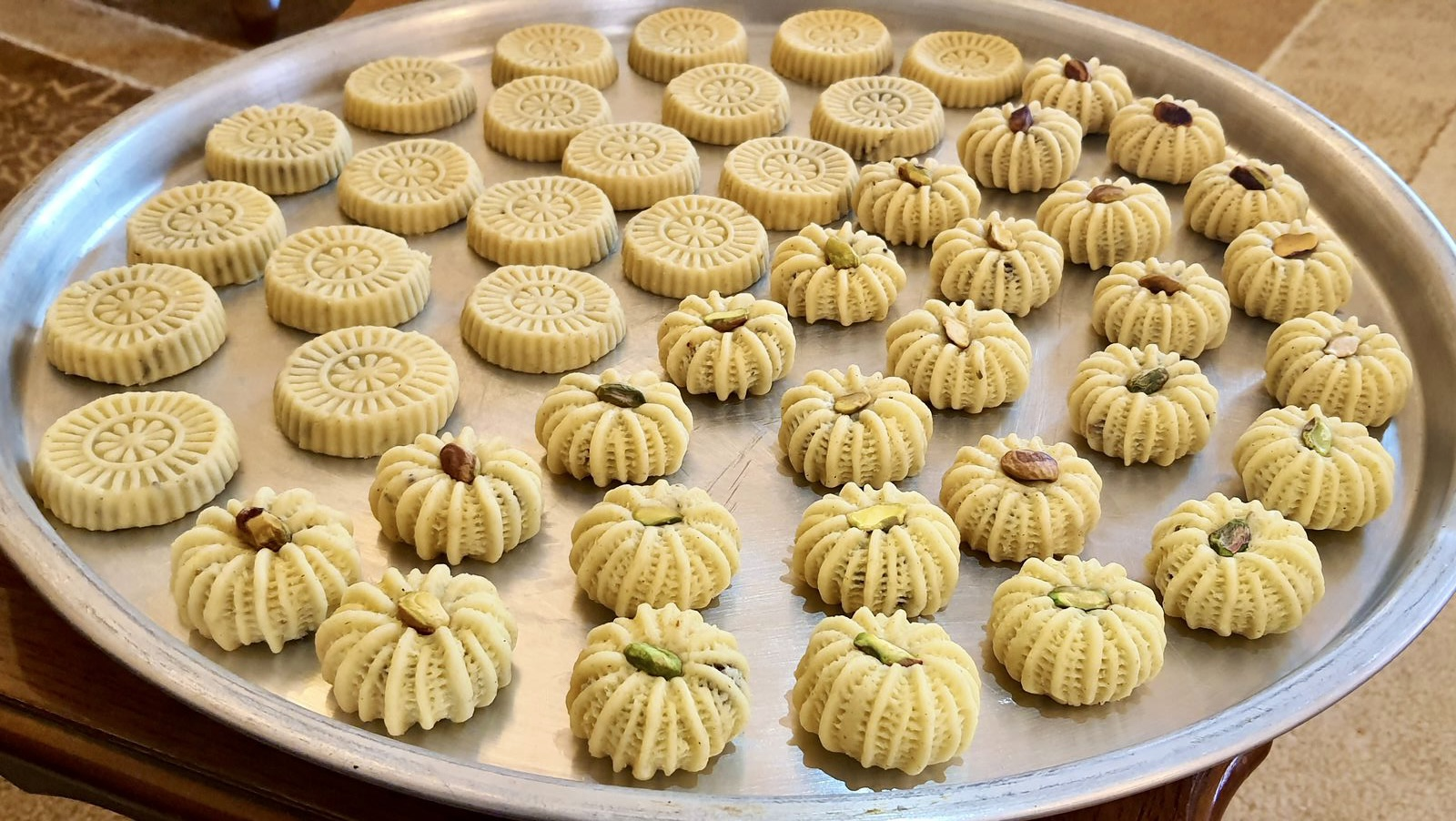
Ma'amoul filled with dates and nuts, not yet baked

== Etymology ==
The Arabic word (معمول maʿmūl [mæʕˈmuːl]) is derived from the Arabic verb ʿamala (عمل, meaning "to do"). Grammatically, it is the verb's passive past participle (اسم مفعول), meaning "that which has been done" or "made."

It is also commonly referred to as maʿmūl al-ʿīd (Arabic: معمول العيد, lit. 'Eid ma'amoul').

== Customs ==
While ma'amoul are consumed all-year long, they are most associated with Eid Al-Fitr or iftar as meals in celebration of the end of Ramadan's fasting. For Christian Arabs as well, ma'amoul is also part of the Easter celebrations.

Ma'amoul was traditionally served by the Sephardic Jewish community of Jerusalem during Purim. It was described as the "Sephardic Hamantash". Ma'amoul is also eaten by Samaritans on Sukkot.

== See also ==
- Kleicha
- Kolompeh
- Koloocheh
- Kue makmur
- List of cookies
- List of pastries
- List of shortbread biscuits and cookies
- Balparmak tatlısı
