= Masghati =

Soft, translucent Iranian confection

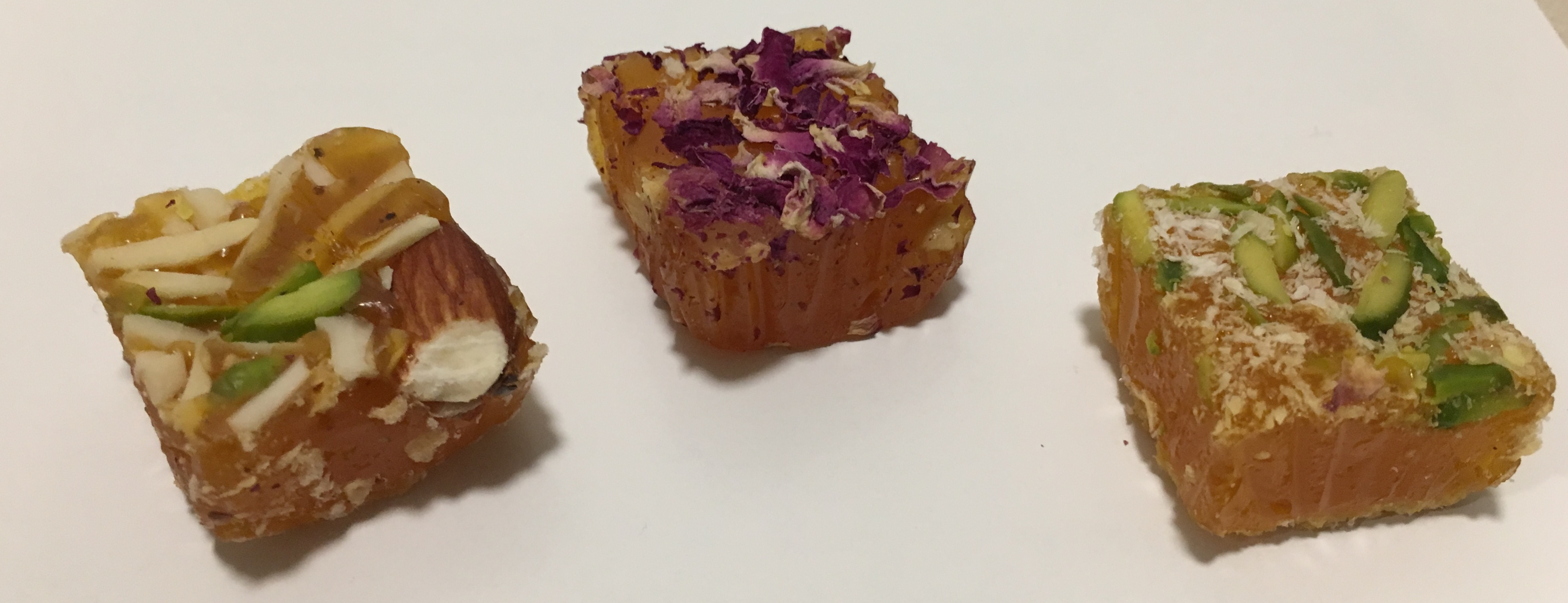
Three decorated Masghati pieces

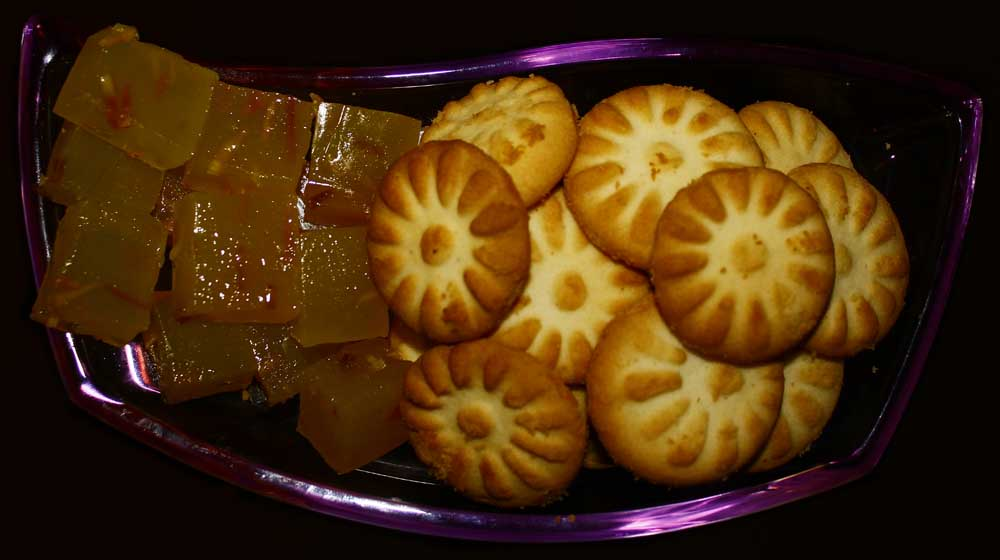
Masghati (left) without decoration and koloocheh

Masghati (in Persian: مسقطی) is a soft and transparent confection in Iran made with rose water, starch, sugar and water. Along with koloocheh, it is a tradition of Nowruz New Year celebrations. Pistachio, saffron, and cardamom can also be used to make masghati. Masghati is produced in Fars province, particularly in Kazeroun, Larestan county and Shiraz. The masghati which is produced in Kazeroun and Larestan are more viscous and sweeter than the Shirazi one. Koloocheh and Masghati are souvenirs of Shiraz.

== See also ==
- Turkish delight – Gelatinous candy
