= Muslim Halwai =

Regions with significant populations
- • Pakistan • India

Religion
- Islam

Related ethnic groups
- Shaikh

The Muslim Halwai are a Muslim community found in various parts of India and Pakistan, mainly in Uttar Pradesh. They have their ancestral backgrounds from Halwai tribes. Halva means sweets in Hindi and Halvai or Halwai are sweet makers. They are also known as Mohammadi Halwai, Adnani.. The Halwai are a Sunni Muslim community. Due to the widespread influence of Sufism and Sufi saints across India, Pakistan, and Bangladesh, many Halwai communities converted to Islam through prominent figures such as Moinuddin Chishti, Baba Fariduddin Ganjshakar, Nizamuddin Auliya, Qutubuddin Bakhtiyar Kaki, and Bahauddin Naqshbandi, becoming their murids (disciples). To express their spiritual connection, they adopted these Sufi saints' names as surnames, such as Chishti, Qadri, Nizami, Misbahi, Razavi, Faridi, and Siddiqui (the latter due to the Naqshbandi order). It's crucial to understand that this adoption of surnames signifies discipleship, not direct lineage.

In Uttar Pradesh, particularly in cities like Badaun, Bareilly, Pilibhit, Rampur, Shahjahanpur, Kannauj, and Kasganj, Muslim Halwais adopted surnames derived from their pirs (spiritual guides) and Sufis. Therefore, individuals with surnames like Farooqui, Siddiqui, Chishti, Faridi, Alvi, or Zaidi are not necessarily direct descendants of these historical figures but rather demonstrate their affiliation with their respective Sufi orders.

Furthermore, some of these Muslim communities, upon achieving economic prosperity, sought to elevate their social standing, sometimes leading to the perception that they belonged to higher social ranks or even claimed Syed lineage. However, Islamic tradition recognizes lineage through direct descent, not through spiritual affiliations. While some individuals attribute themselves to the Qadri or Barkaati orders, this does not automatically make them descendants of Shaykh Abdul Qadir Jilani of Baghdad or Shah Barkatullah of Marehra Sharif, Uttar Pradesh. It simply indicates their connection to those particular Sufi traditions.

They are a landless community, involved in the selling of sweetmeats, tobacco, and as well as the occupation of dyeing clothes. Members of the community members have taken up jobs in government and private service. They are largely an urban community, living in their residential quarters. Almost all older cities in North India and Pakistan have a Halwai Mohalla The Muslim Halwai have their own registered committee with name of All India Muslim Halwai biradari committee to deal with matters relating to the community. Haji Mahmood Ahmad is a founder and President of all India Muslim halwai biradari committee.
