= Gudia (caste) =

Confectionery community of Odisha, India

Gudia/Gudiya
- Varna: Vaishya
- Religions: Hinduism
- Languages: Odia
- Populated states: Odisha • Chhattisgarh • Andhra Pradesh
- Related groups: Halwai, Kanu

Gudia or Guria or Gudiya (also known as Madhuvaishya) is a caste found in the Indian states of Odisha and Chhatishgarh, also a small population in Andhra Pradesh. Traditionally their occupation is making of various type of sweets for village ceremonies and festive occasion and subsist on this business. They are also supplier of offerings for village deity. Nowadays they have opened their modern sweet stalls in markets for better business.

== Social Status ==
The Gudias are classified under Other Backward Classes in both the state of Odisha, Chhattisgarh and West Bengal.
