= Akanes =

Regional Greek Sweet

Akanés
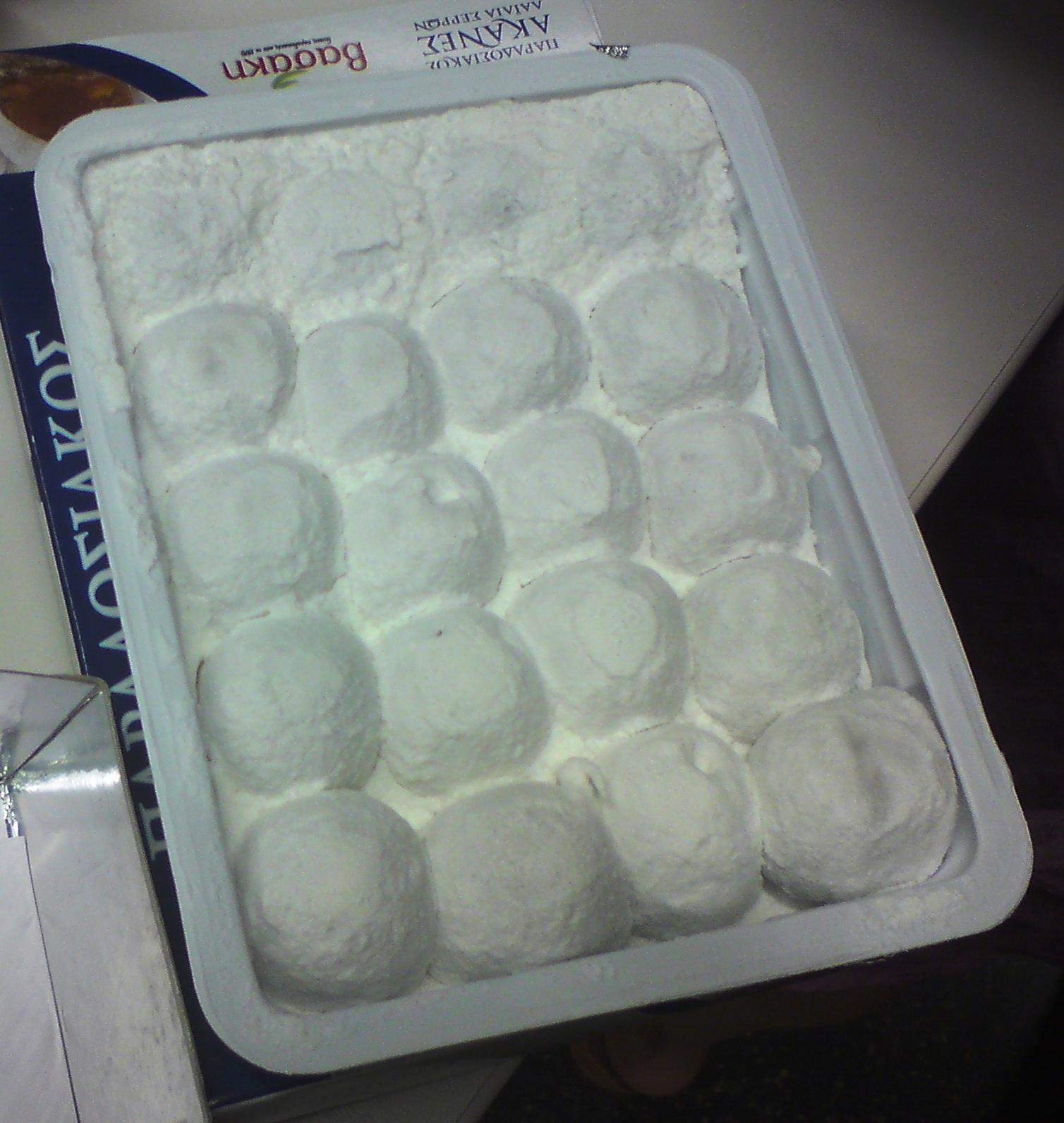
- An opened package of "akanes" sweets
- Type: Confectionery
- Place of origin: Serres, Greece
- Main ingredients: Starch, sugar, butter

Akanes (Greek: Ακανές) is a Greek sweet similar to loukoumi but flavoured with fresh goats' milk butter rather than fruit essences. It is made exclusively in the town of Serres in Northern Greece. The name akanes dates to the time of Ottoman rule in Greece, when it was called hakanes halva or royal halva (hakan deriving from the Turkish han and kağan). The sweet is available especially in the regional unit of Serres and in delicacy shops throughout Greece.
