= Kahk =

Sweet shortbread biscuit eaten in Egypt

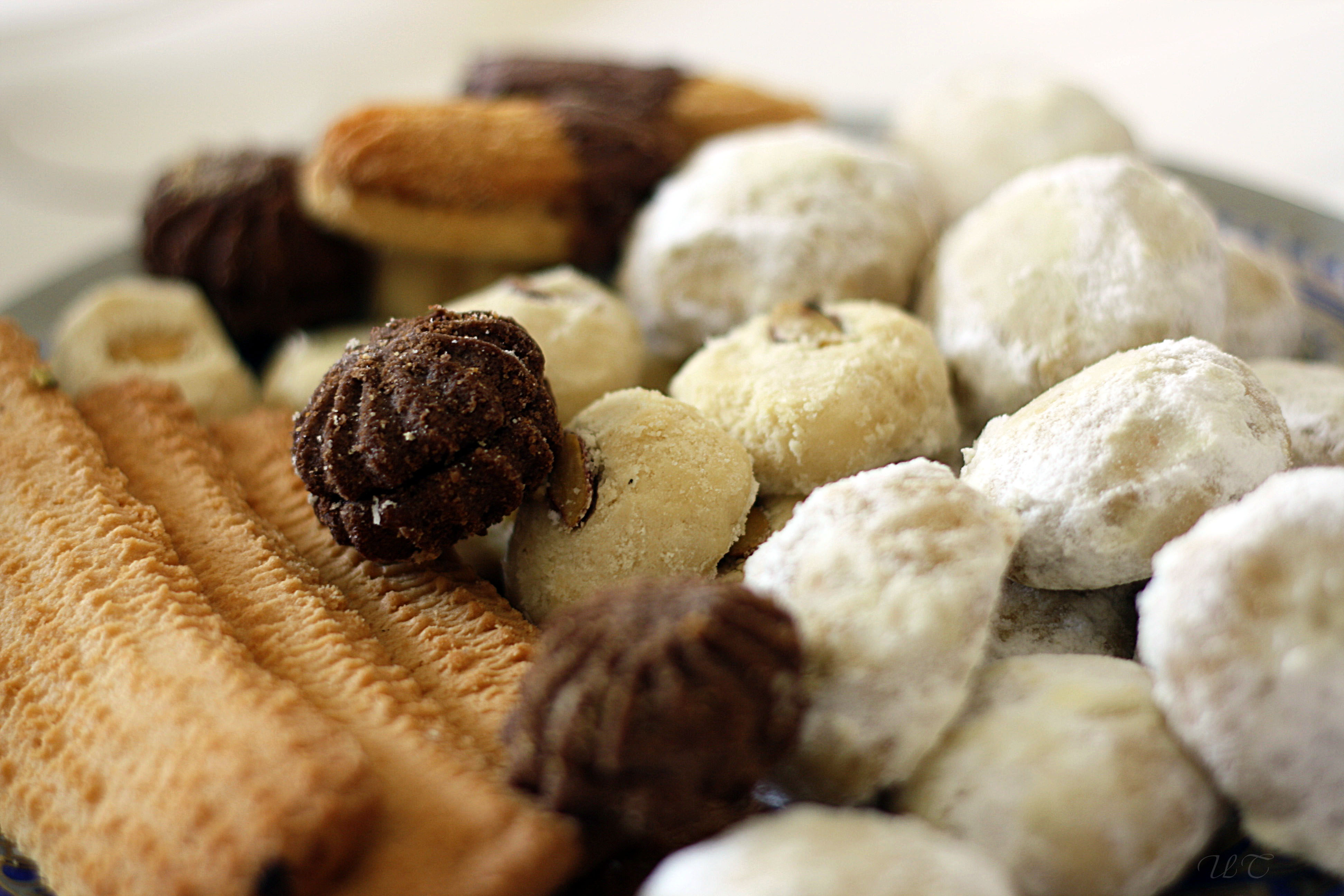
- Kahk with powdered sugar, with other assorted Eid biscuits, including ghorayeba and nashader
- Alternative names: Kahk El Eid
- Type: Biscuit
- Place of origin: Egypt
- Main ingredients: Flour, ghee and sugar

Kahk (Egyptian Arabic: كحك), also Kahk El Eid (كحك العيد [ˈkæħk el ˈʕiːd]), is a sweet shortbread biscuit that is eaten in Egypt, primarily to celebrate festive occasions like Eid al-Fitr as well as during Christmas and Easter.

It is covered with powdered sugar and can be stuffed with ʿagameyya (عجمية [ʕæɡæˈmej.jæ], a mixture of honey, nuts, and ghee), lokum, walnuts, pistachios, or dates, or simply served plain. Date-filled kahk are believed to be the origin of maamoul, a similar biscuit eaten in the Levant during Eid.

Different types of cookies are known more broadly in other parts of the Arab world as kaʾak (Arabic: كعك), although the term and its variants may refer to different baked goods depending on the region.

== History ==
The word kahk comes from the Coptic word for cake (Sahidic Coptic: ϭⲁⲁϭⲉ, romanized: Kaakē, Coptic pronunciation: [/ˈkaː.ke/]).

Kahk is believed to date back to ancient Egypt. Murals depicting people preparing kahk have been discovered in the ruins of temples in Memphis and Thebes, as well as in tombs dating to the Eighteenth Dynasty, approximately 3,500 years ago. In the tomb of Rekhmire, the process of making kahk is depicted, which included mixing honey with ghee, heating the mixture over a fire, and then combining it with flour to form a dough. The dough was shaped on slate boards and baked in ovens. These biscuits were produced in a variety of geometric forms, and were even stamped with a solar disk, a symbol associated with the sun god Ra. Larger, pie-sized versions known as shurik were also baked and brought to ancestral tombs, where they were believed to serve as magical amulets.

The tradition persisted after the advent of Christianity in Egypt. Its ornamentation differed from earlier periods, with a cross replacing earlier depictions of the sun. During the later Muslim period, the Aten sun disc motif was reintroduced onto kahk, while the cross remained a fixed feature for Egypt’s Christians. It was and is still commonly served on special occasions, like Christmas, Easter and Nayrouz.

During the Tulunid dynasty bakers created kahk molds inscribed with religious expressions such as kol wishkur ("eat and thank God"). Kahk rose to greater prominence under the 10th-century Ikhshidid dynasty, which was the first to formally incorporate it into the Eid al-Fitr celebrations. An Ikhshidid official, Abu Bakr Mohammed bin Ali al-Madrani, became known for hiding gold dinars inside kahk distributed to the public, a practice that entered Egyptian folklore and was later emulated by other rulers. For example, in 1124 CE (518 AH), the Fatimid caliph reportedly spent 20,000 dinars baking and distributing kahk filled with gold for Eid. The scale of this effort required preparations to begin during the month of Rajab, preceding Ramadan, and led to the establishment of a dedicated government department, the Diwan al-Fitr. Similarly, Caliph Al-Aziz is said to have arranged a table 1,350 meters long, laden with 60 varieties of kahk and ghorayibah, some of which contained gold coins.

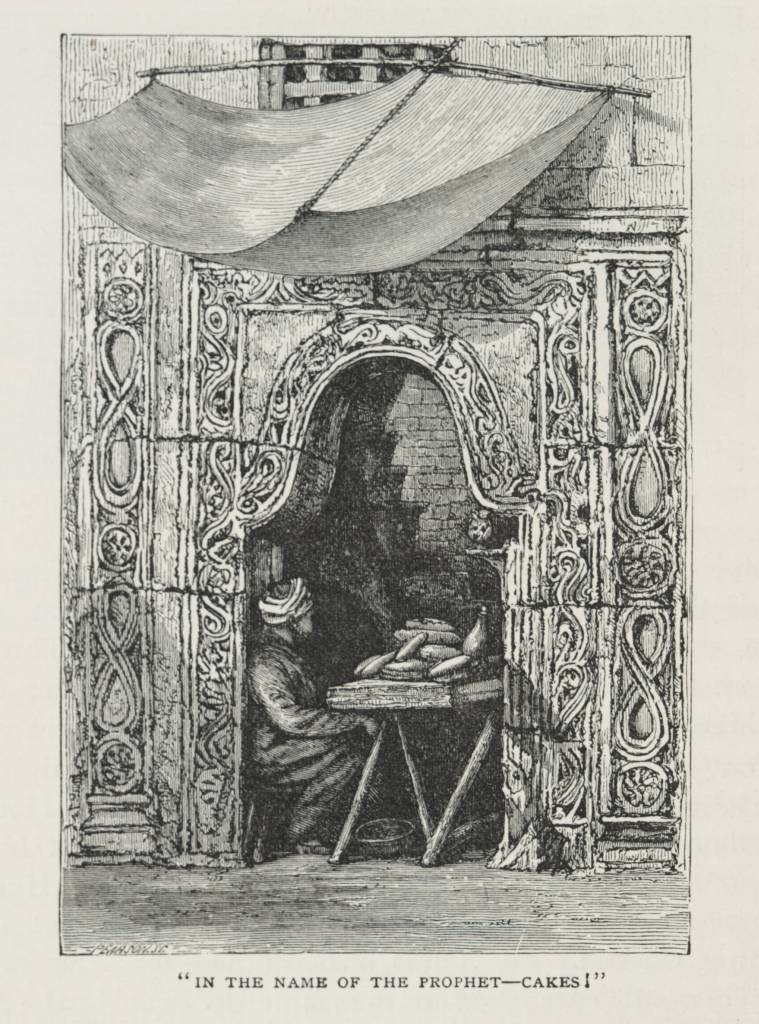
19th century illustration of a kahk vendor in Egypt.

The Fatimid state used kahk distribution as a tool of public engagement, both as a means of appeasement, comparable to the Roman policy of "bread and circuses," and as a form of propaganda. Kahk was often stamped with messages promoting loyalty to the government or its leaders. Fatimid-era molds have been found bearing inscriptions such as "eat and thank your Lord" (كل وأشكر مولاك) and "thank Hafeza" (تسلم ايديكي يا حفيظة), the latter referring to an official responsible for producing kahk. This inscription is also regarded as an early example of product branding.

Following the fall of the Fatimids, the Sunni Ayyubid dynasty came to power in 1174. Sultan Salah ad-Din, in an effort to erase Shia Fatimid customs, attempted to suppress the practice of consuming kahk during Eid. Despite his broad influence over Egyptian society, he was ultimately unsuccessful, underscoring the deeply rooted popularity of kahk. Under the Mamluks, state-sponsored distribution of kahk was revived, particularly during Eid and Easter. Mamluk rulers frequently distributed kahk to marginalized groups such as Sufis, students, and the poor, although there is no evidence that they included gold coins in the pastries. Like their Fatimid predecessors, the Mamluks used kahk as a means of social control and to bolster public support. This tradition continued under the Ottoman administration. By the 14th and 15th centuries, the baking and distribution of kahk were closely associated with charitable endowments known as awqaf.

During the Islamic period, the Christian cross that sometimes adorned kahk was replaced by inscriptions, geometric motifs, including solar disk imagery, and stylized plant patterns. Several kahk molds from the Fatimid era are preserved in the Museum of Islamic Art in Cairo, where they are recognized as significant examples of Islamic decorative arts and Arabic calligraphy.

== Cultural significance ==
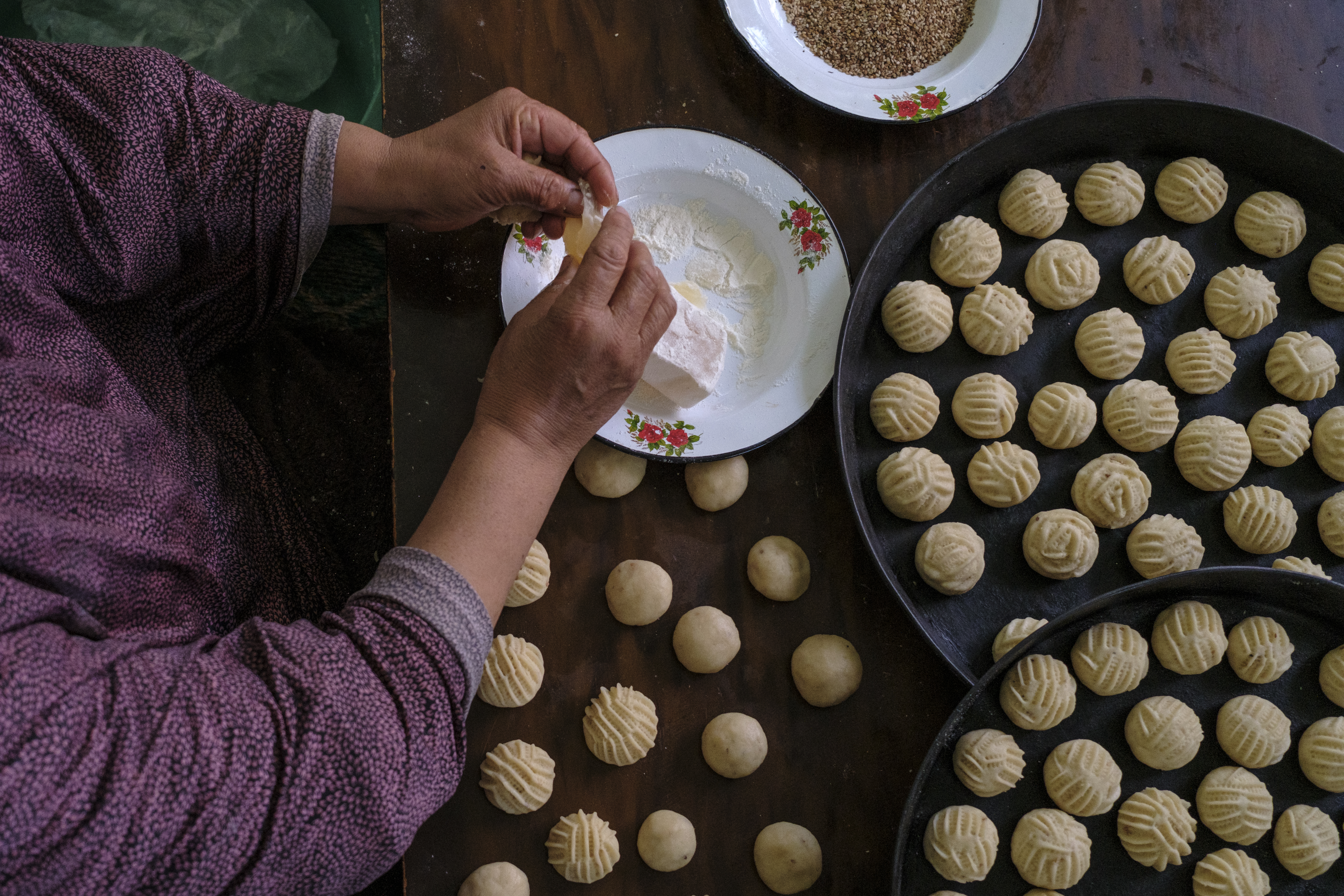
Preparation of kahk for Eid al-Fitr.

Kahk is an important element of Egyptian cultural and culinary traditions. In addition to its central role during Eid, when it is commonly offered to guests, kahk is also served during wedding celebrations and occasionally during other festive occasions, such as Mawlid.

The preparation of kahk is a longstanding communal and social tradition. Women in villages and neighborhoods often gather to bake kahk collectively, engaging in conversation and exchanging stories and recipes as part of the process. In some cases, families prepare the dough at home and then bring it to communal or commercial bakeries for baking and cooling.

Kahk is also widely exchanged as gifts among families and friends, with informal competitions over whose version is best being a common feature of the celebrations. The designs stamped on the surface of kahk are often intricate and regarded as a point of familial pride. Traditional molds, typically crafted from wood or ceramic, are sometimes passed down across generations.

While kahk has long been available from bakeries, the trend of purchasing ready-made kahk has grown in urban areas in recent years. However, due to the relatively high cost of store-bought kahk, many Egyptians, particularly those in rural areas, continue to bake their own at home.

== See also ==
- Ka'ak
- Kleicha
- Ma'amoul
- Fig roll
- Crocetta di Caltanissetta
- List of cookies
- Qatayef
