= Kue makmur =

Traditional Malay cake

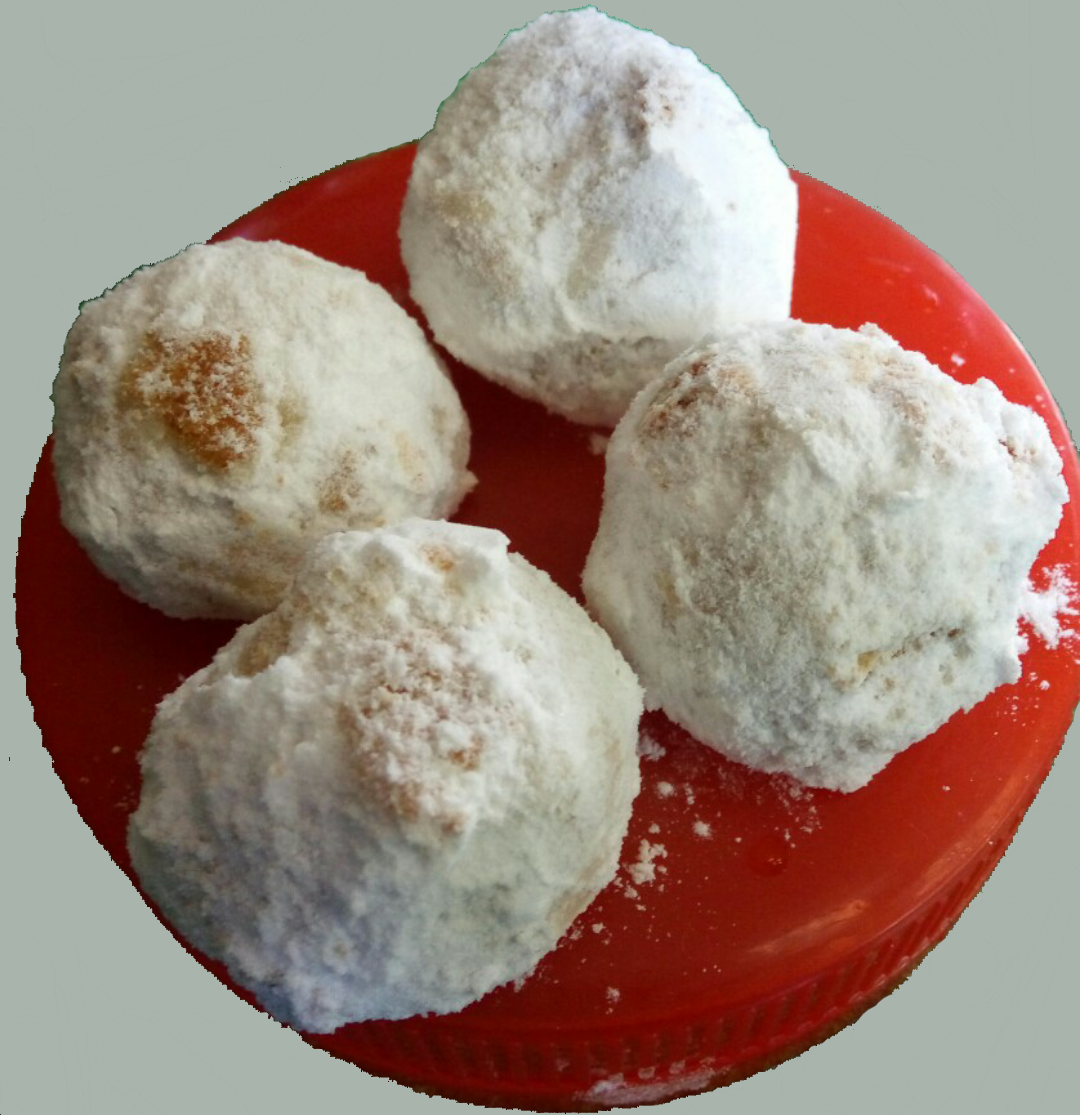
- Alternative names: Kuih makmur
- Type: Cake, pastry, kue
- Course: Snack, dessert
- Place of origin: Brunei, Indonesia, Malaysia and Singapore
- Region or state: Southeast Asia
- Created by: Malays
- Serving temperature: room temperature
- Main ingredients: Nuts, ghee, flour and icing sugar

Kue makmur (Malay: kuih makmur, Jawi: معمور; Bruneian Malay: kuih mor) is a traditional Malay kue or kuih. This cake made from nuts in a powder form, ghee, flour and icing sugar. Its availability is limited to the bazaars of the month-long Ramadhan, and it is served to guests for Eid al-Fitr. Kue makmur is identified with its white colour and usually in a round shape.

== History ==
The origin of kue makmur is somewhat uncertain and believed to be derived from the Middle Eastern ma'amoul that was introduced by Arab merchants throughout the Malay Archipelago. Since then, kue makmur has been a part of the traditional kue or kuih of Brunei, Indonesia, Malaysia and Singapore. In 2015, kue makmur was featured in a series of Singaporean stamps. Loosely translated, they would be called "prosperous biscuits (UK)/cookies (US)".

== See also ==
- Kue
- Kuih
- Ma'amoul
