= Kolompeh =

Pastry from Kerman, Iran

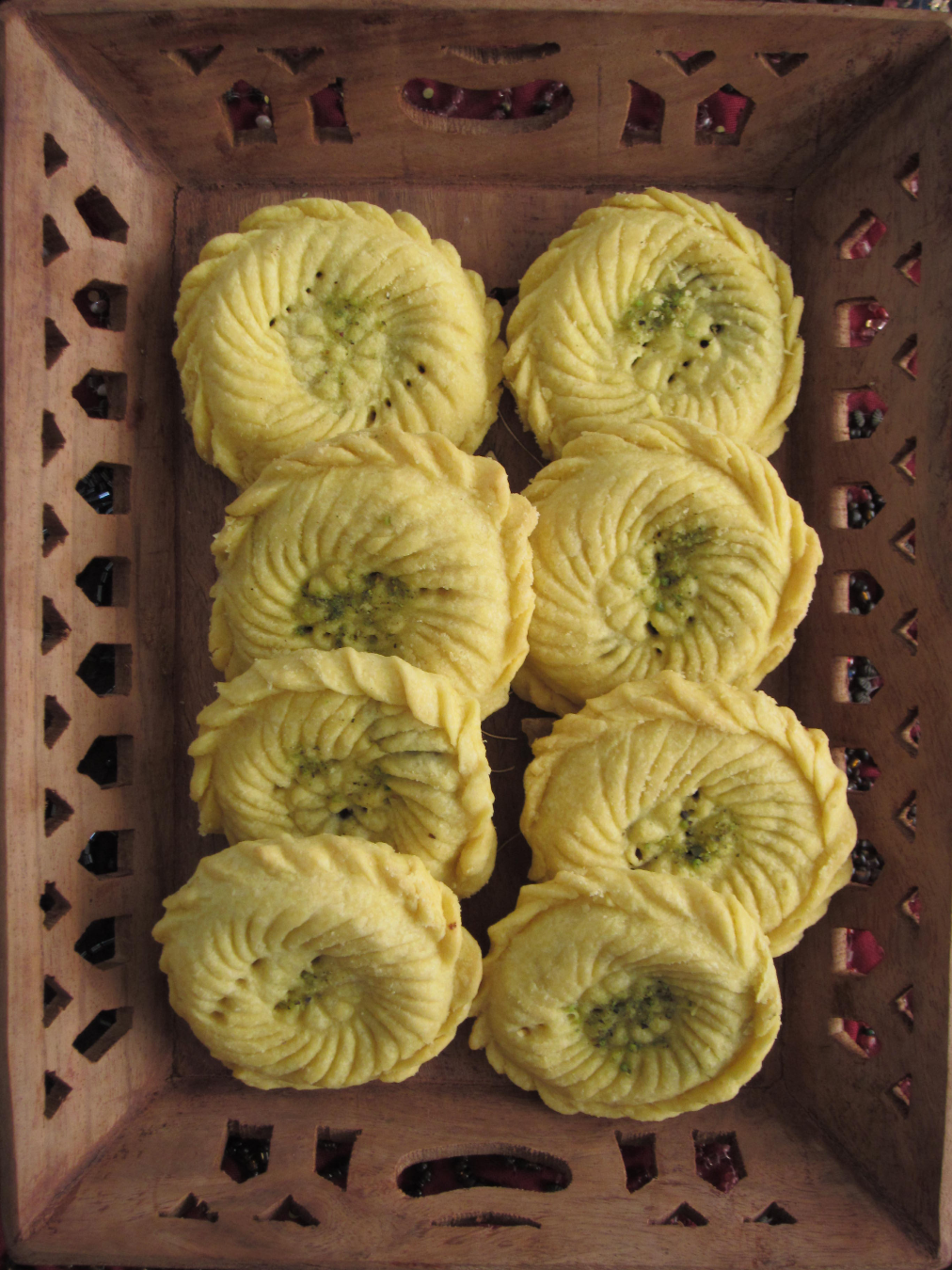
- Kolompeh-Kerman
- Type: Pastry
- Place of origin: Iran
- Region or state: Kerman

Kolompeh (Persian: کلمپه) is an Iranian pastry baked in the city of Kerman. Kolompeh looks like a pie with a mixture of minced dates with cardamom powder and other flavoring inside. Dates, wheat flour, walnuts and cooking oil are the main ingredients. Pistachios or sesame powder are often used for decorating kolompeh.

== History ==
Kolompeh traditionally was baked by Kermani women using local oils, dates from Kerman date palms, Persian walnuts, local cardamom, sesame, and local wheat flour. Industrially produced kolompeh has now become one of the main Kerman souvenirs. It is manufactured using a variety of formats with a variety of nuts.

== Variants ==
A Turkish variant of this pastry called kolumpe kurabiyesi is made of wheat flour, dates, walnuts, almonds, pistachios, and vegetable oil.

== See also ==
- Koloocheh
- Kleicha
- Kulich (bread)
- Ma'amoul
