= Turkish delight =

Gelatinous candy

Lokum
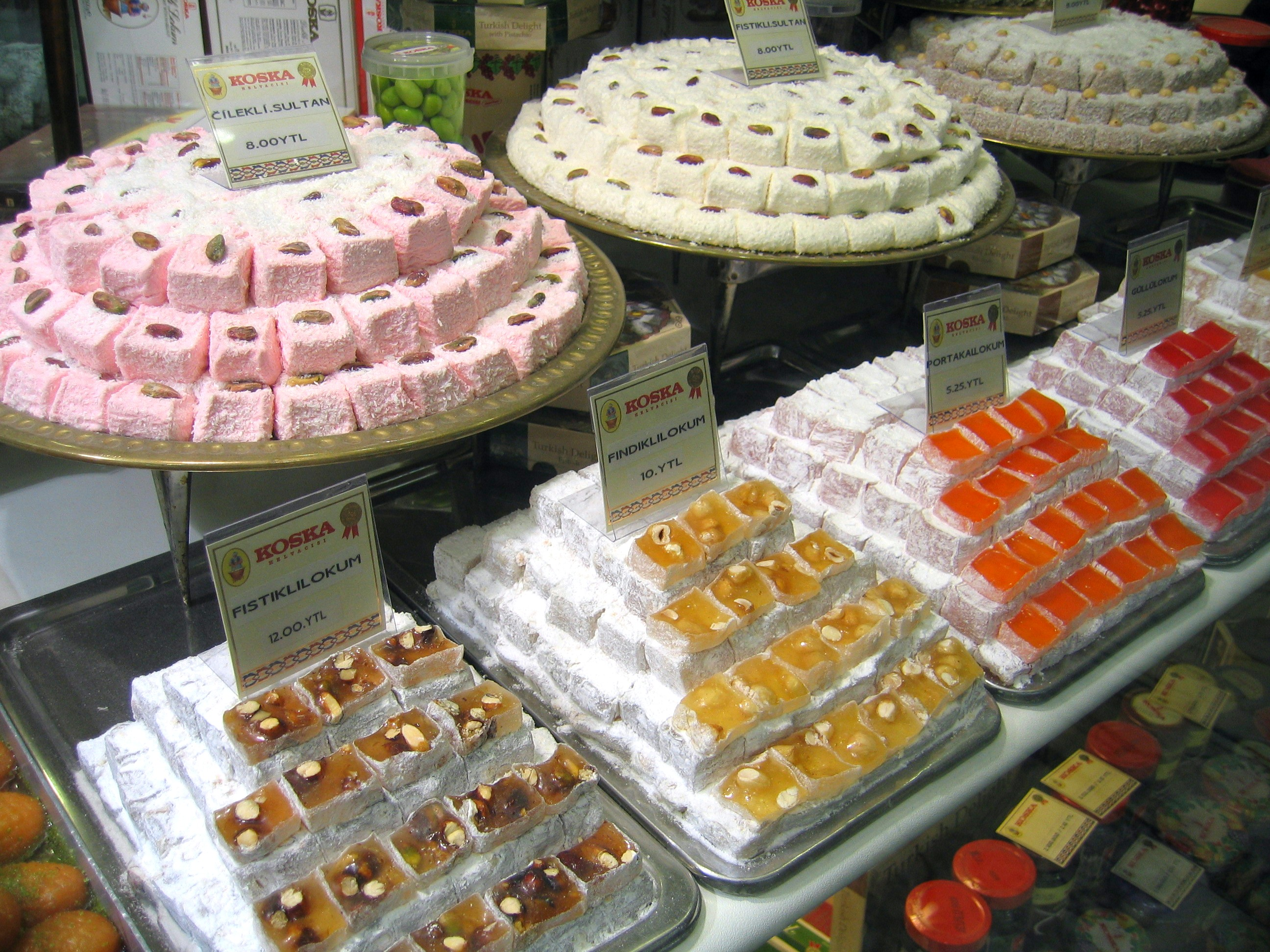
- An assortment of Turkish delight on display in Istanbul
- Type: Confection
- Serving temperature: Room temperature
- Main ingredients: Starch, sugar
- Ingredients generally used: Fruit, nuts, honey
- Variations: Multiple

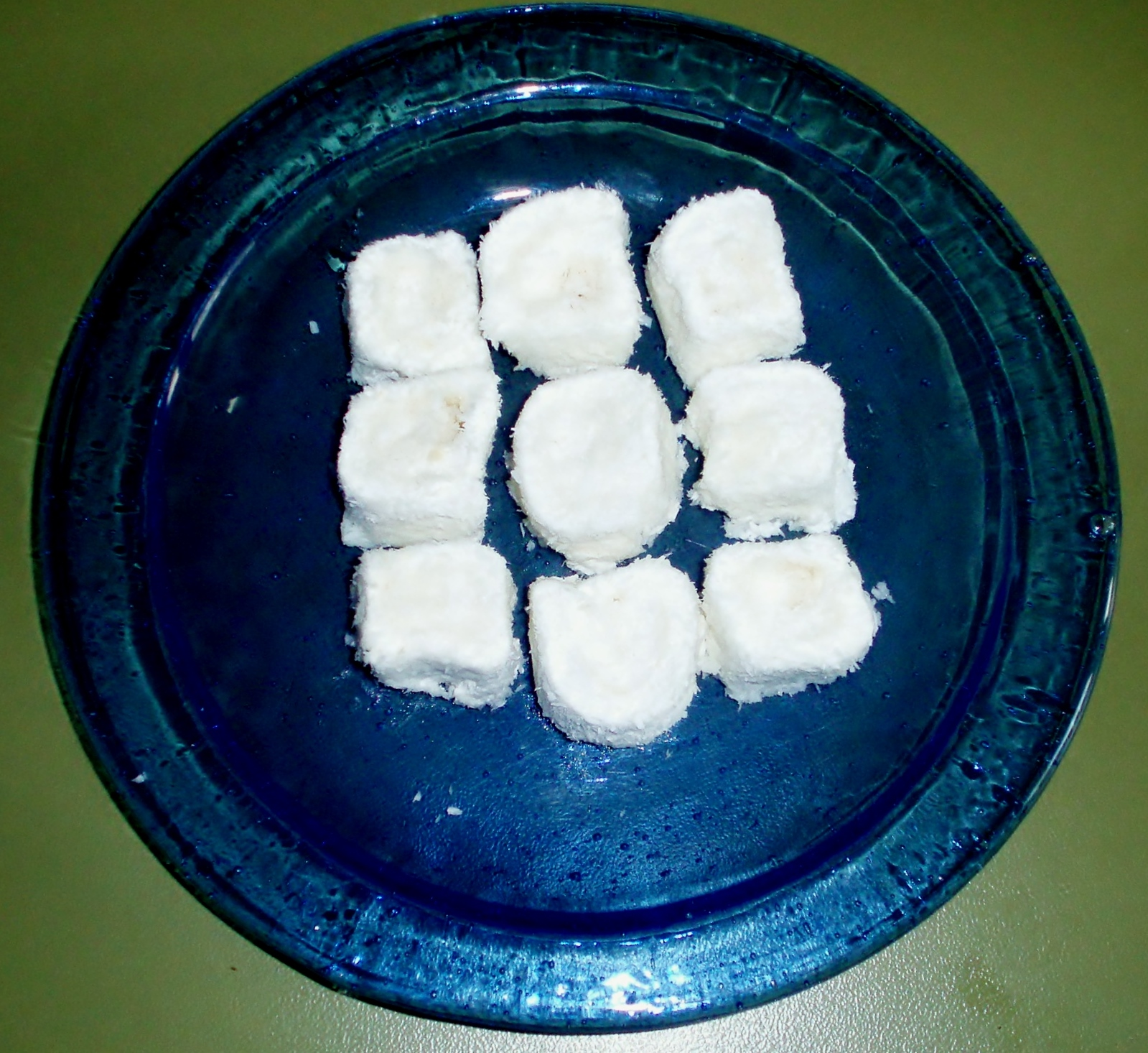
Kaymak lokum, Turkish delight of cream, a specialty of Afyonkarahisar

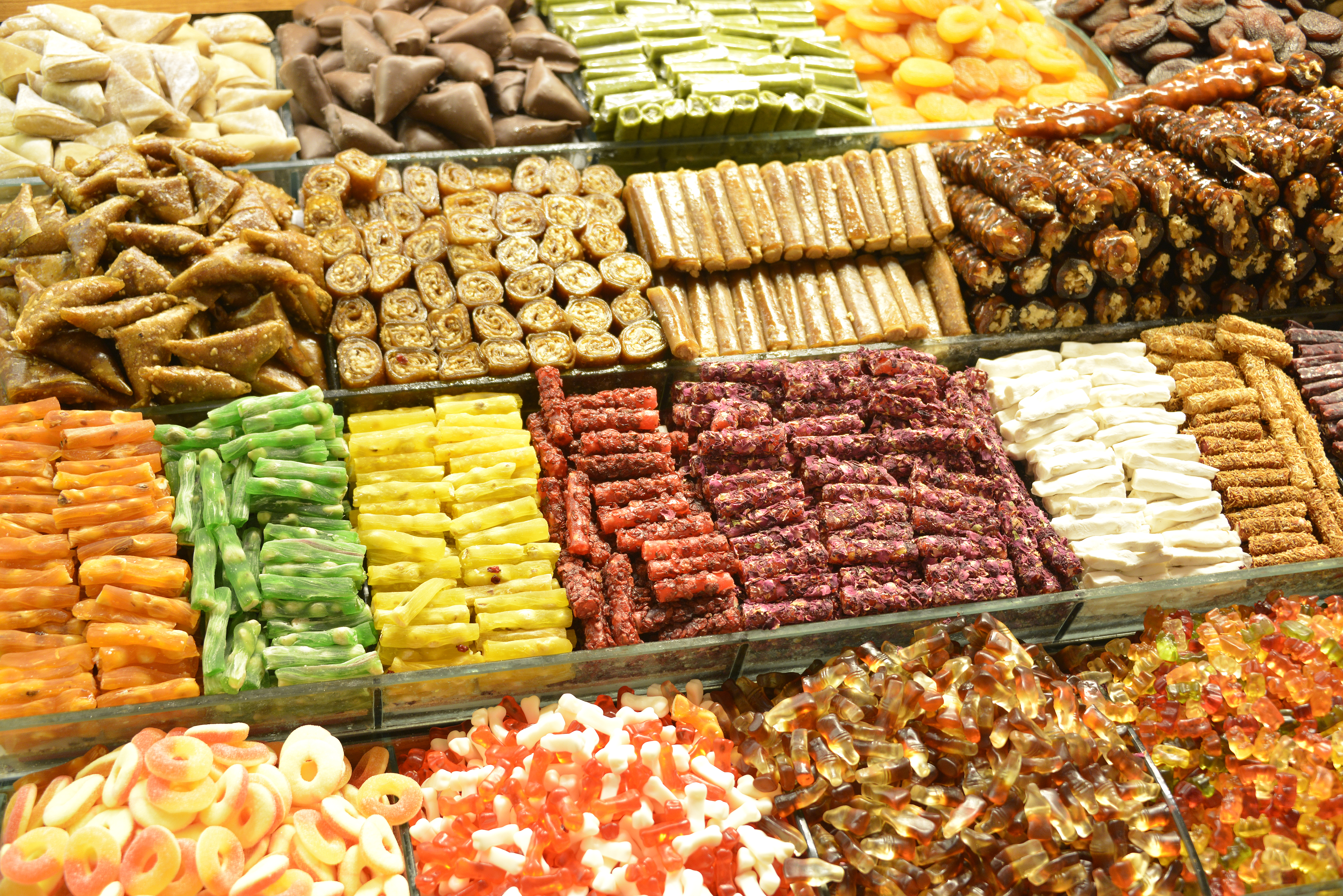
Turkish delights in a spice bazaar in Istanbul

Turkish delight, lokum (/ˈlɒkʊm/) or loqum (/ˈlɒkʊm/) is a family of confections based on a gel of starch and sugar. Premium varieties consist largely of chopped dates, pistachios, hazelnuts or walnuts bound by the gel; traditional varieties are often flavored with rosewater, mastic gum, bergamot orange, or lemon. Other common flavors include cinnamon and mint. The confection is often packaged in small cubes dusted with icing sugar, copra, or powdered cream of tartar to prevent clinging.

== Name ==
The Turkish names lokma and lokum are derived from the Arabic word luqma(t) (لُقْمَة) and its plural luqam (لُقَم), meaning 'morsel' and 'mouthful'. According to Nişanyan, the word lokma derives from the Turkish word lātiloḳum, meaning "a sweet made with starch" and this word derives from the Arabic word rāḥatu'l-ḥulḳūm راحت الحلقوم, meaning comfort of the throat. He also states that lokum is essentially the name of the fried dough dessert known today as lokma. The commercial product known as rahatül-hulkum, known from the 17th century, is understood to have been named after the sound similarity: latilokum > lokum. The form (رَاحَةُ ٱلْحُلْقُوم), meaning 'comfort of the throat', remains the name in formal Arabic.

In Egyptian Arabic, Turkish delight is called malban (ملبن [ˈmælbæn]), or ʕagameyya. Although it is called "malban" in some regions, "malban" may also refer to other similar desserts, such as a type of grape fruit leather made with semolina and grape juice popular in the Levant.

Its name in various languages of the Balkans comes from Ottoman Turkish lokum (لوقوم) or rahat-ul hulküm. Its name in Greek, λουκούμι (loukoumi) shares a similar etymology with the modern Turkish and it is marketed as Greek Delight. In Romania, it is called rahat. In Bulgaria, it is called lokum. In Hungary, it is called lokum or szultánkenyér (Sultan's bread). Its name in Serbia, Croatia and Bosnia and Herzegovina, is ratluk (ратлук), rahat or lokum.

In Cyprus, where the dessert has protected geographical indication (PGI), it is also marketed as Cyprus Delight. In Armenian it is called lokhum (լոխում). It is läoma ܠܥܡܐ in Assyrian. Its name in Russia and Israel is rahat lokum, and derives from a very old confusion of the two names found already in Ottoman Turkish; indeed this mixed name can also be found in Turkey today. In Persian, it is called rāhat-ol-holqum (راحت الحلقوم). In the Indian subcontinent, a variant of it is known as Karachi halwa or Bombay halwa.

In English, it was formerly alternatively known as "lumps of delight".

== History ==
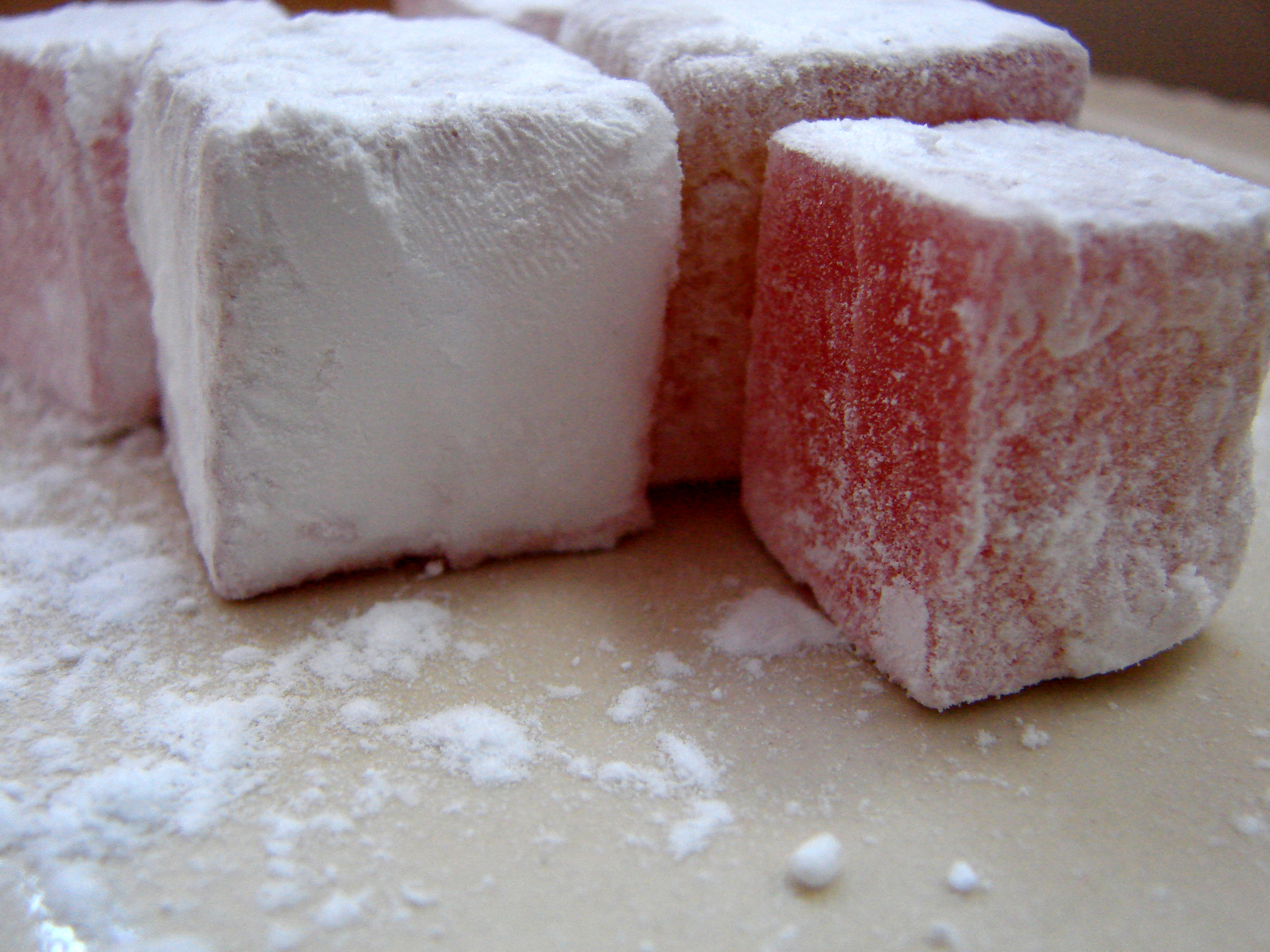
Rosewater-flavored Turkish delight

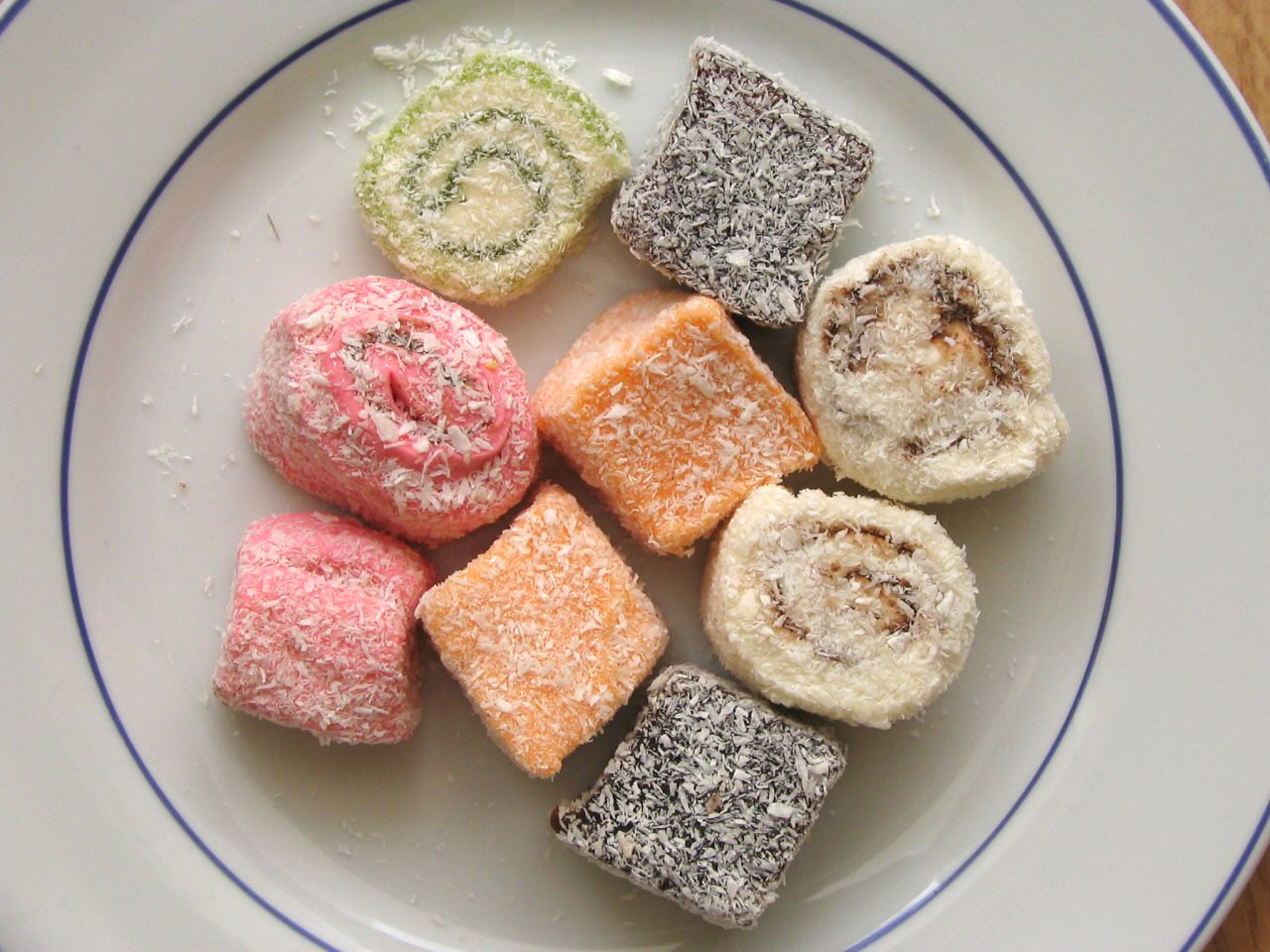
Several Turkish delight variants prominently featuring dried coconut

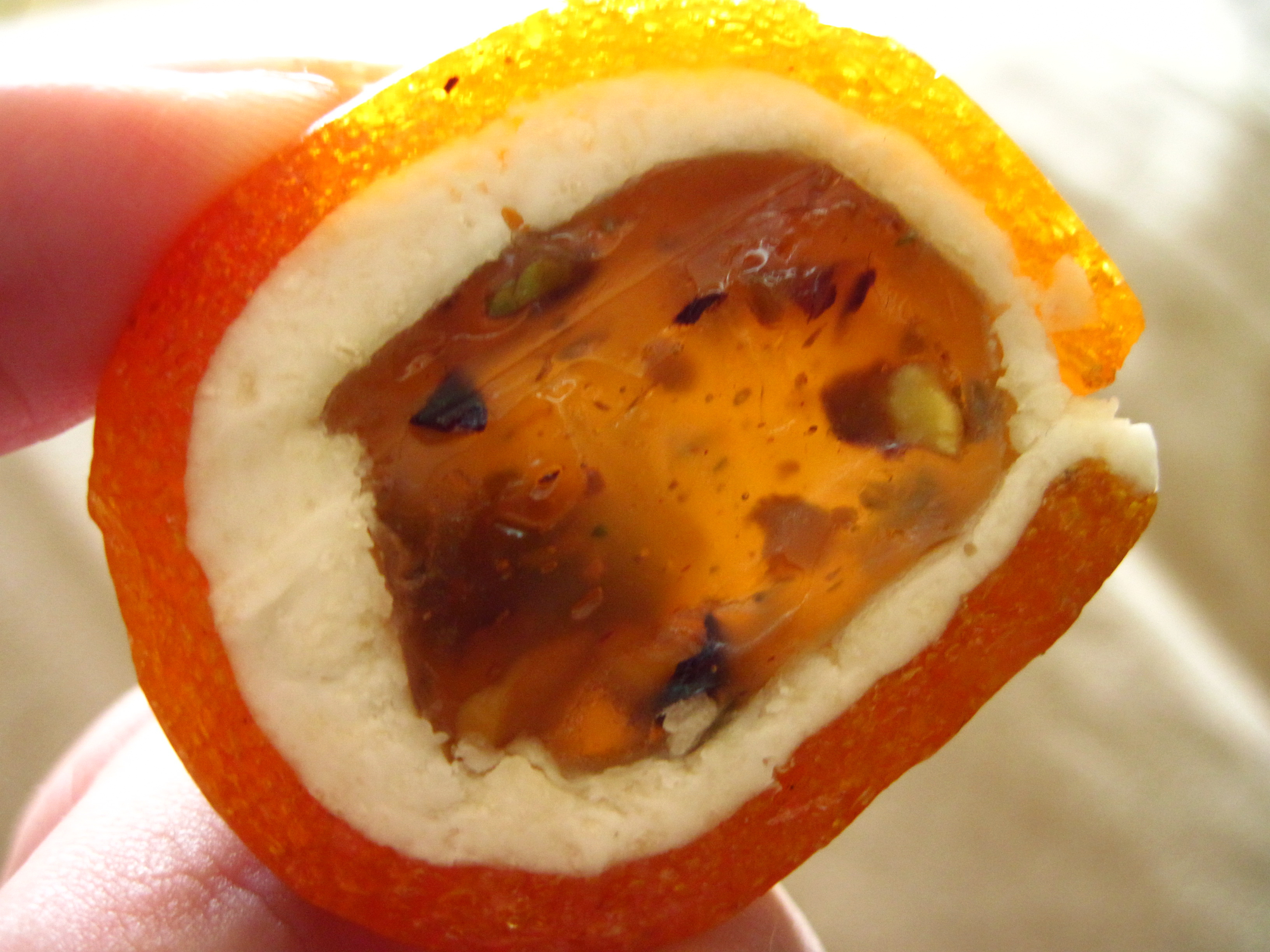
A variation on Turkish delight surrounded by layers of nougat and dried apricot

A lokum-like dish also existed in the Byzantine Empire called paloudakin (Medieval Greek: παλουδάκιν) or apalodaton (Medieval Greek: ἀπαλοδᾶτον). It was borrowed from the Arabs. The Byzantines did not follow a specific recipe for the dish, which was instead described as "yellow by the color of honey and a starch candy of sugar dissolved with rosewater". The Byzantine paloudakin was related to the Persian pālūdah and the Arabic fālūdhaj, gelatinous starch-based sweets that have been described as the ancestors of Turkish delight.

Another similar confection, called malban, has existed in the medieval Middle East; the 14th-century traveller Ibn Battuta described malban in his travelogue, The Travels of Ibn Battuta. He wrote that malban was made in Damascus from grape syrup thickened with a powder. Food historian Nawal Nasrallah considers this to be an ancestor of modern-day lokum.

=== Ottoman period ===
According to the Dani Valent "confectioner Hacı Bekir Effendi, who arrived in Constantinople (now Istanbul) from Anatolia in 1776, is often credited with its invention". However, historians of sweets, have questioned this popular attribution of the invention of Turkish delight to Hacı Bekir, writing that "specific names and dates are often erroneously associated with the invention of particular sweets, not least for commercial reasons". Similar Persian recipes, including the use of starch and sugar, predate Bekir by several centuries. The Oxford Companion to Food states that although Bekir is often credited with the invention, there is no real evidence for it. According to Tim Richardson, lokum was "most likely invented by Arab apothecaries some time around the ninth century, as a species of lohoch".

== Variations ==
=== The Balkans ===
Turkish delight was introduced to European portions of the Ottoman Empire under its rule and has remained popular. Today it is commonly consumed with coffee. Rosewater and walnut are the most common flavorings.

==== Greece and Cyprus ====
In Greece, Turkish delight, known as loukoumi (λουκούμι), has been popular since the 19th century or earlier, famously produced in the city of Patras (Patrina loukoumia) as well as on the island of Syros and the northern Greek cities Thessaloniki, Serres and Komotini but elsewhere as well. Loukoumi is a common traditional treat, routinely served instead of biscuits along with coffee. In addition to the common rosewater and bergamot varieties, mastic-flavored loukoumi is available and very popular. Another sweet, similar to loukoumi, that is made exclusively in the town of Serres, is akanés. Cyprus is the only country that has a protected geographical indication (PGI) for this product: Loukoumi made in Yeroskipou is called Λουκούμι Γεροσκήπου (loukoumi geroskipou).

==== Romania ====
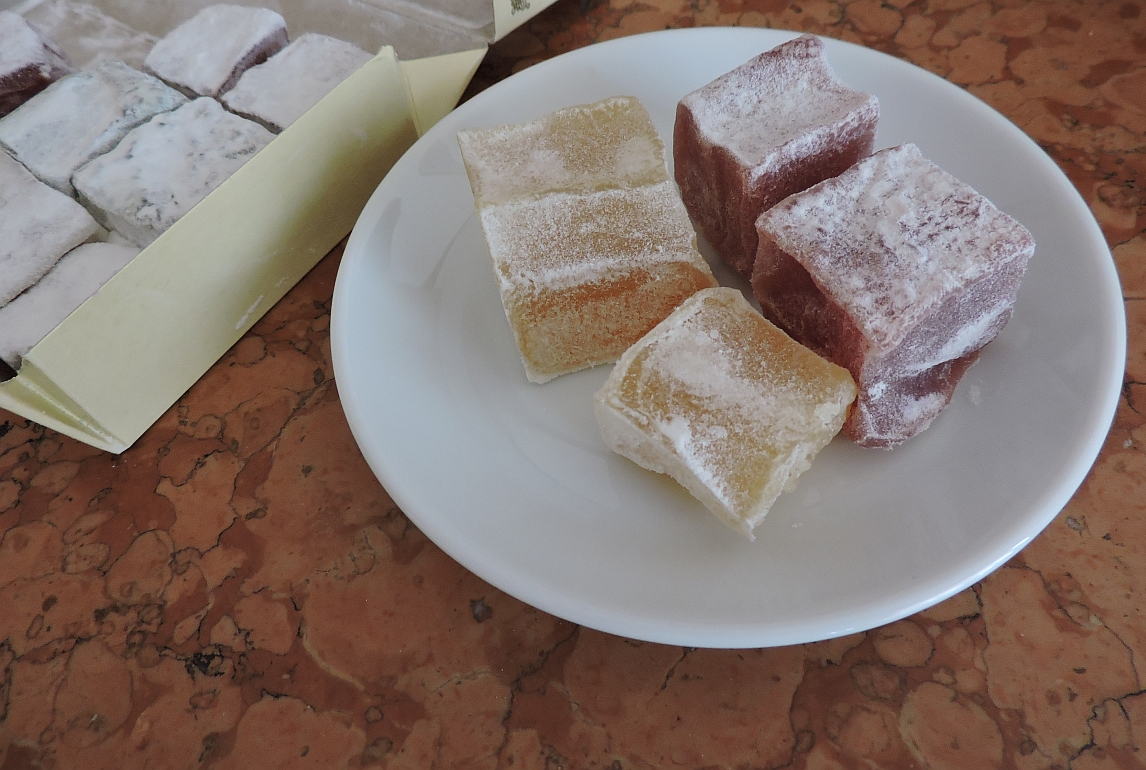
Fruit-flavored rahat from Romania

In Romania, Turkish delight is called rahat and it is eaten as is or is added in many Romanian cakes called cornulețe, cozonac or salam de biscuiţi.

==== Serbia ====
In Serbia it is commonly known as ratluk and served along with tea and coffee.

==== Hungary ====
In Hungary, it is commonly known as lokum or szultánkenyér (Sultan's bread).

==== Bulgaria ====
In Bulgaria, Turkish delight is known as lokum (локум) and enjoys some popularity.

=== Armenia ===
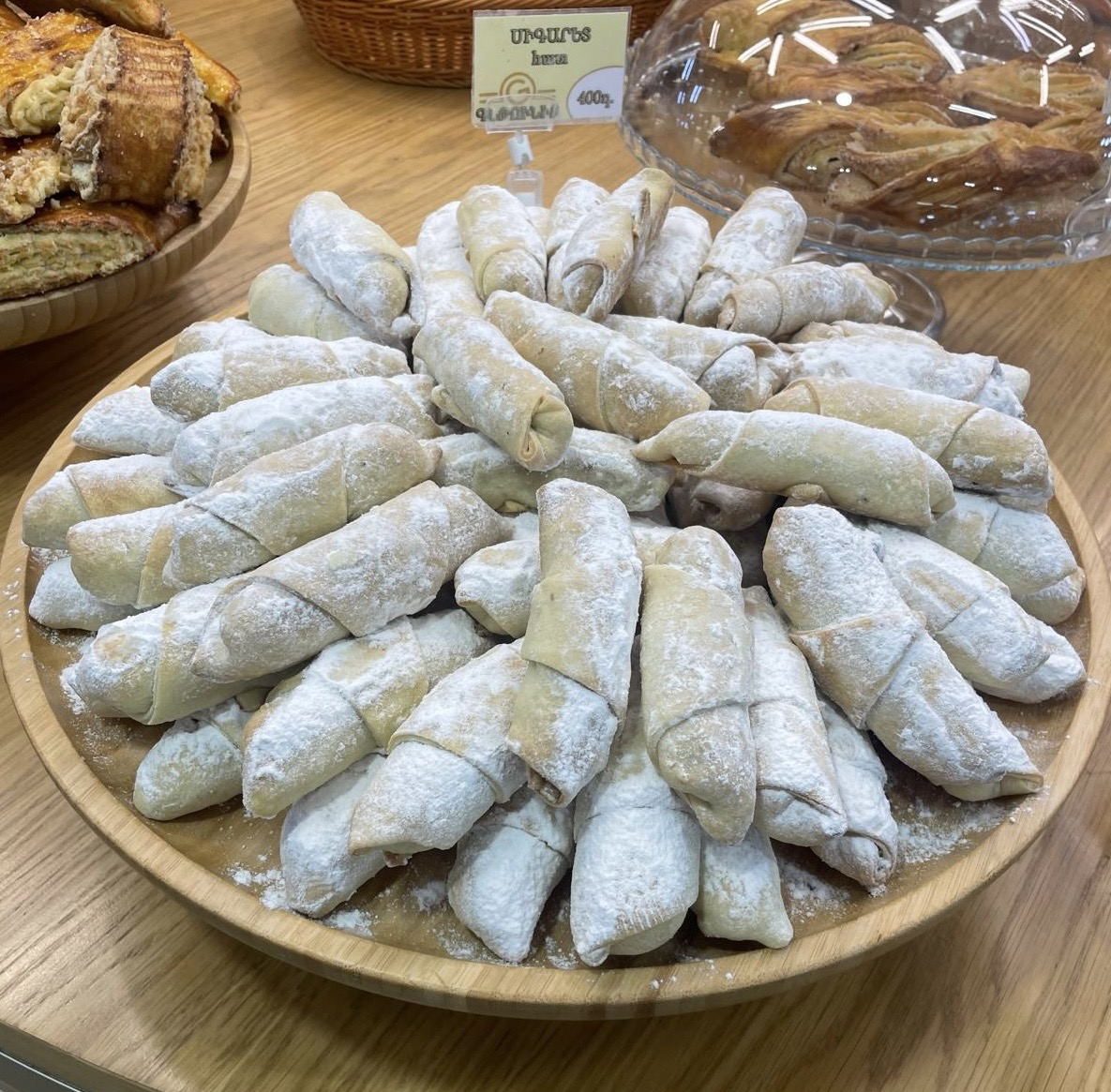
Armenian cigarette cookies

In Armenia, Turkish delight is known as lokhum (Armenian: լոխում) and used for various sweets. For example, it is used to make cigarette cookies (Armenian: սիգարետ թխվածքաբլիթներ), soft cookies that are rolled into the form of a cigarette. They are filled with either lokhum, a mixture of sugar, cardamom, and walnuts, or a combination of both. The dough mainly consists of matzoon, butter, eggs, and flour. When finished the pastry is dusted with powdered sugar.

=== India and Pakistan ===
In Karachi, now in Pakistan, the "Karachi halwa" was made with corn flour and ghee and became quite popular. It is said to have been developed by Chandu Halwai which later relocated to Bombay (Mumbai) after the partition in 1947. Some of the confectioners termed it Bombay Halwa to avoid its connection with a Pakistani city. In the year 1896, a confectioner Giridhar Mavji who ran a shop Joshi Budhakaka Mahim Halwawala attempted to replace the starch with wheat flour and thus invented Mahim halwa which consists of flat sheets.

=== Ireland, the United Kingdom and Commonwealth countries ===
Fry's Turkish Delight, created in 1914, is marketed by Cadbury in the United Kingdom, Ireland, Australia, South Africa, Canada and New Zealand. It is rosewater-flavored, and covered on all sides in milk chocolate. UK production moved to Poland in 2010. Hadji Bey was an Armenian emigrant to Ireland who in 1902 set up an eponymous company – still in existence – to produce rahat lokoum for the Irish and later UK markets.

=== Canada ===
In Canada, the Big Turk chocolate bar made by Nestlé consists of dark magenta Turkish delight coated in milk chocolate.

=== Arab World ===
==== Palestine ====
Lokum being cut into shape in the old city of Hebron.

Lokum is called rahat halqum (Arabic: راحة حلقوم), and factories making it are found in Ramallah, Nablus, Gaza City, and the Old City of Hebron. Common flavorings include mastic and pomegrante, and it is sometimes shaped into a roll. It is usually covered in nuts and shredded coconut. The factories in Hebron and Nablus are reported to date back to the 19th century, during Ottoman rule. It is made plain or with a filling of nuts.

==== Egypt ====
In Egyptian cuisine, lokum, locally called malban, is a common filled for kahk (cookies made for Eid al-Fitr).

== Related products ==
Turkish delight was an early precursor to the jelly bean, inspiring its gummy interior.

== In popular culture ==
Turkish delight features as the enchanted confection the White Witch uses to gain the loyalty of Edmund Pevensie in The Lion, the Witch and the Wardrobe (1950) by C. S. Lewis. Sales of Turkish delight rose following the theatrical release of the 2005 film The Chronicles of Narnia: The Lion, the Witch and the Wardrobe.

== Cultural significance ==
Turkish delight holds deep cultural significance in Greece, Turkey, Iran, and across the Middle East and the Balkans. It symbolizes hospitality, generosity, and celebration. In Turkey, lokum is a staple during festive occasions such as weddings, where it symbolizes sweetness and prosperity in the couples' life together. Similarly, during religious festivals like Eid al-Fitr and Eid al-Adha, it is exchanged as gifts among family and friends. In Greece, loukoumi is a symbol of hospitality and refinement. It is commonly served to guests alongside tea or coffee, representing warmth and respect for visitors.

== See also ==
- Aplets & Cotlets – Confection
- Botan Rice Candy – Japanese brand of confectionery
- Dodol – Southeast Asian sweet toffee
- Gumdrop – Type of candy
- Gyūhi – Traditional Japanese sweet
- Halva – Confections often made from nut butters or flours
- Karachi halwa – Indian confection
- Marron glacé – Chestnut candy confection from France and Italy
- Marzipan – Confection of sugar and almond flour
- Masghati – Soft, translucent Iranian confection
- Mochi – Japanese rice cake
- Turkish cuisine – Culinary traditions of Turkey
