= Patrina loukoumia =

Patrina loukoumia or loukoumia Patron (Greek Λουκουμια Πατρών) is a Turkish delight (lukum) produced in Patras, Greece.

== History ==
The Aggelopouloi Bros company was the birthplace and only major producer of Patrina Ioukoumia in the early 20th century. The company was closed in the early 1990s.

The company V. Manoussos & Sons (Β. Μανούσος & Υιοί) became the second notable producer of the sweet. Founder Vassilios Manoussos had initially worked for Aggelopouloi Bros and later decided to found their own company. The company later started using the trademark Achaiki (Αχαϊκή) 'of Achaia'.

Vassilios Manoussos introduced boukies loukoumia, bite-sized pieces remaining from cutting and packing loukoumi. These cuttings were usually melted into the next loukoumi batch, but now they represent more than 30% of all loukoumi sales. Boukies (μπουκιές) mean "small bites" or "nuggets".

Patrina Loukoumia originally came in three flavors, each with a distinctive color: red with rose flavor, white with mastic flavor, and green with bergamot flavor. Today there is a variety of new flavors.
