= Koloocheh =

Persian cookie

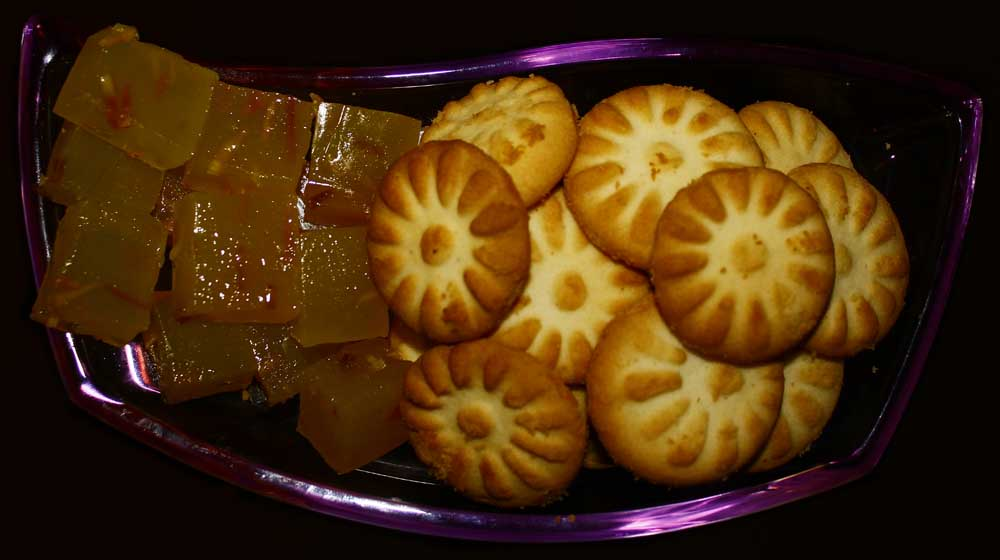
- Masghati (left) and Koloocheh (right)
- Type: Cookie
- Place of origin: Iran
- Region or state: Shiraz, Fuman, Lahijan, Kermanshah and Khuzistan

Koloocheh or kleicha (Persian: کلوچه), also known as Persian New Year bread, is a Persian stamped cookie or bread, originating in various parts of Iran. There are many variations on the recipe (bready texture vs. crispy; stuffed vs. unstuffed) made in Iran and in Persian diaspora communities, including in Eastern Europe and North America.

== About ==
Typically, koloocheh are cookies filled with dates and walnuts, but they can be stuffed with grated coconut and additionally spiced with saffron, rose water, cardamom, cinnamon, or citrus zest. Caspian cuisine-style bready koloocheh cookies can be made vegan by replacing butter with coconut oil.

It is a recipe made by Persian Jews during the holiday Purim; by Christians during Easter; and Muslims during Ramadan. For Norooz (English: Persian New Year), Iranians will make a koloocheh bread. Koloocheh cookies from Southern Iran are brittle biscuits that principally consist of water, sugar, wheat flour and egg white.

Koloocheh

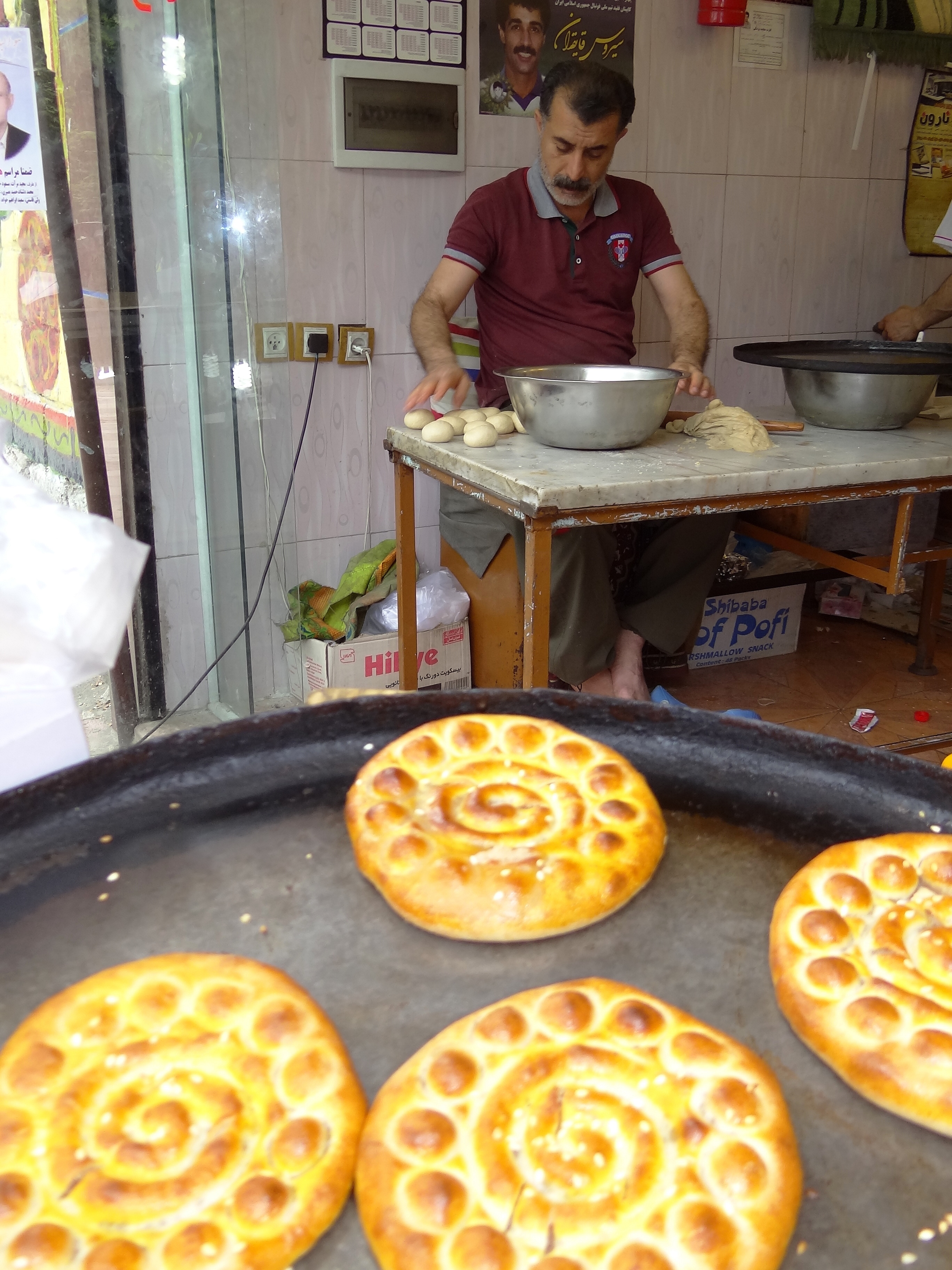
Traditional cookie making in Punel village

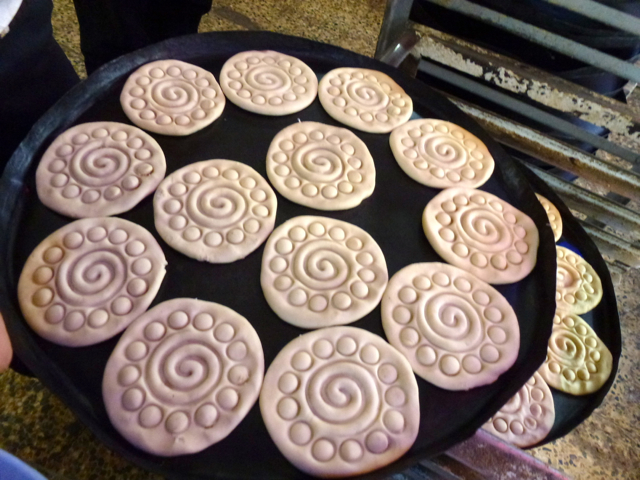
Renowned thin koloocheh from Fuman, Iran prior to cooking

== Etymology ==
From Middle Persian [Book Pahlavi needed] (kwlʾck' /kulāčag/, “small, round bun”)

== See also ==
- Kolompeh
- Ma'amoul
- Murabbalı mecidiye
