= Balparmak tatlısı =

Turkish dessert

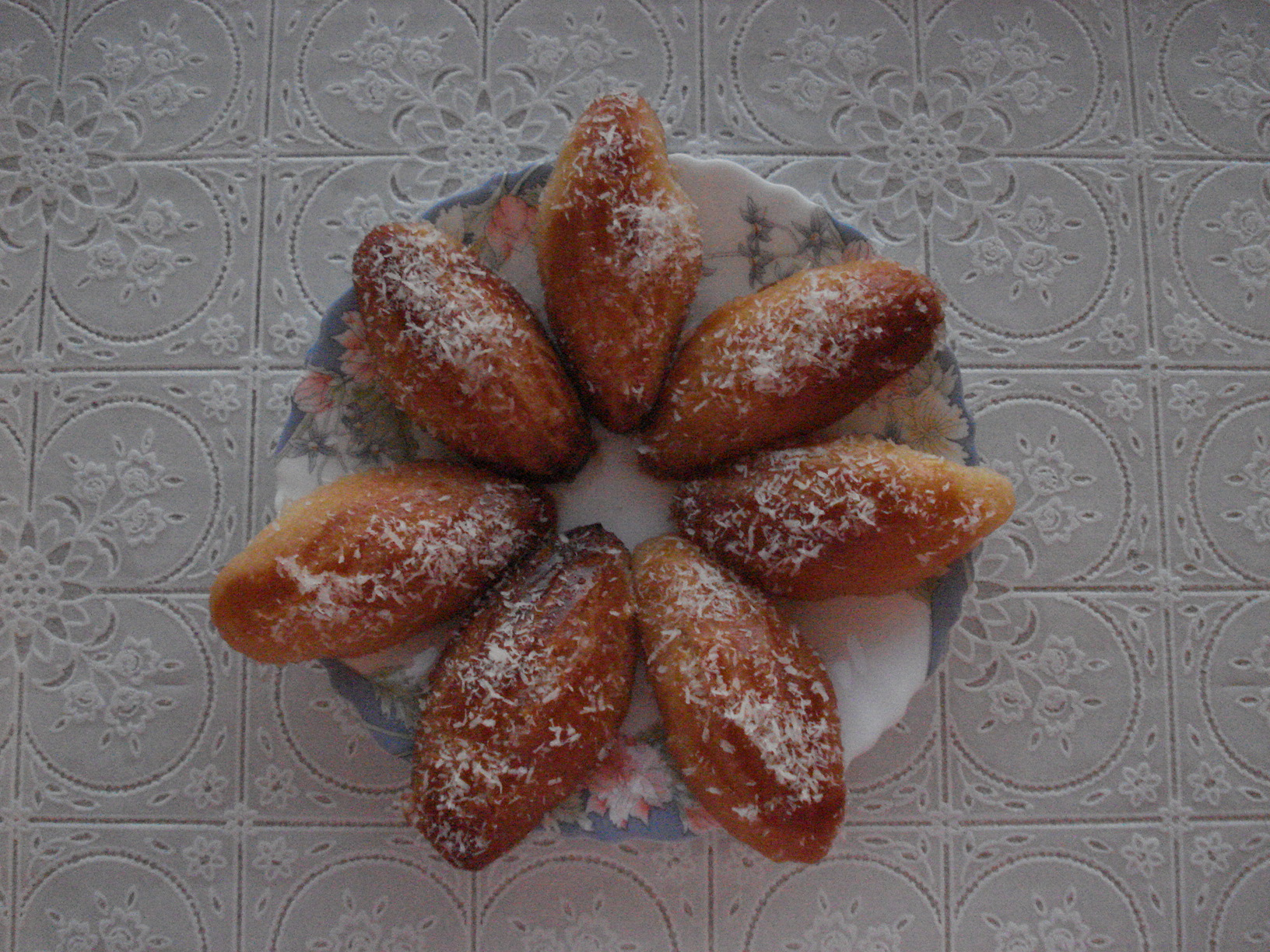
- Course: Dessert
- Place of origin: Turkey
- Created by: Ottoman cuisine
- Main ingredients: eggs, butter, baking powder, walnuts, cinnamon, cloves, semolina, flour For the sherbet: sugar, water, lemon

Balparmak tatlısı (Honey finger dessert) is a type of Turkish dessert. It is similar to kalburabastı and Vizier's fingers.

== See also ==
- Şekerpare
- Revani
- Baklava
- Tulumba
