= Halwai =

Regions with significant populations
- • India•Bangladesh •Nepal * Pakistan

Languages
- • Hindi • Bengali • Maithili • Awadhi • Bhojpuri • Angika • Marwari • Punjabi

Religion
- • Hinduism, Jainism

Related ethnic groups
- • Muslim Halwai • Bania • Vaishya

Halwai is an Indian caste and a social class, whose traditional occupation was confectionery and sweet-making. The name is derived from the word Halwa which is a sweet dish.

The community is known by different names in different parts of India. For instance, it's called Modanseni, Yagyaseni, Kany Kujb Halwai, Madheshiya Halwai, Kanu (Kandu) etc. in Bihar and Uttar Pradesh. Moira-Modak in West Bengal; Gudia in Odisha and so on.

== Customs ==
Balarama is the celebrated plougher so called Halwahi or Halwai or Haluwai, one of the pillars of agriculture along with livestock with whom Krishna is associated with. The plough is Balarama's weapon. In the Bhagavata Purana, he uses it to fight demons, dig a way for Yamuna river to come closer to Vrindavan and pull the entire capital of Hastinapura into the Ganges river.

Baba Ganinath Govindji is the kul Guru (school) of Halwai caste.

== Halwais in Nepal ==
The Central Bureau of Statistics of Nepal classifies the Halwai as a subgroup within the broader social group of Madheshi Other Caste. At the time of the 2011 Nepal census, 83,869 people (0.3% of the population of Nepal) were Halwai. The frequency of Halwais by province was as follows:

- Madhesh Province (0.8%)
- Koshi Province (0.4%)
- Lumbini Province (0.3%)
- Bagmati Province (0.1%)
- Gandaki Province (0.0%)
- Karnali Province (0.0%)
- Sudurpashchim Province (0.0%)

The frequency of Halwais was higher than national average (0.3%) in the following districts:

- Siraha (2.1%)
- Saptari (1.8%)
- Dhanusha (1.5%)
- Sunsari (1.1%)
- Mahottari (0.8%)
- Morang (0.8%)
- Kapilvastu (0.6%)
- Banke (0.5%)
- Parasi (0.5%)
- Sarlahi (0.5%)
- Rupandehi (0.4%)

== See also ==
- Chandu Halwai
