= Karachi halwa =

Indian confection

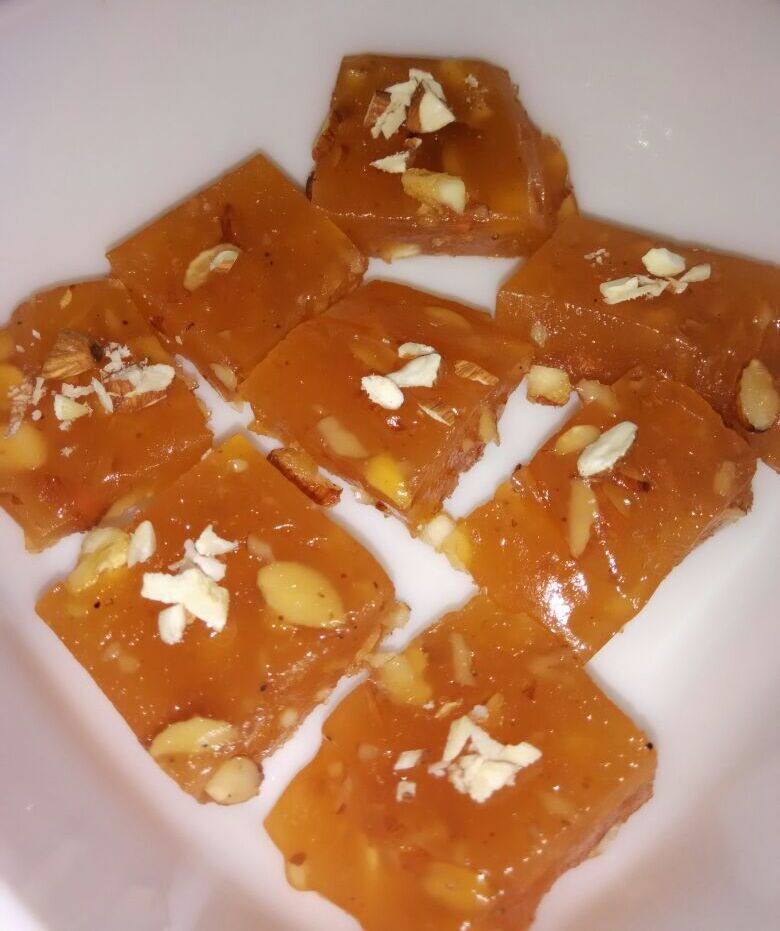
- Type: Confection
- Place of origin: Karachi (Sindh)
- Serving temperature: Room temperature
- Main ingredients: Corn starch, sugar and ghee
- Ingredients generally used: Chilghoza, melon seeds, almonds
- Variations: Many colors like orange, yellow, green and red

Karachi halwa (Urdu: کراچی حلوہ), or Bombay halwa, is a chewy, glossy, and translucent Pakistani and Indian confection consisting of cornstarch, sugar, ghee, and water, flavored with cardamom, melon seed and occasionally almonds. It has a jelly-like texture, unlike traditional soft halwas, and is known for its bright hues such as orange, green and yellow.

Karachi halwa is a specialty in Pakistan and India, especially during festivals like Eid, Diwali, and weddings. It has a long shelf life.

== History ==
The name Karachi halwa is believed to have originated in Karachi before the partition of 1947 and was brought to Bombay from Karachi by halwais (sweet makers), after the partition.

As the dessert gained popularity in Bombay (now Mumbai), India, it also began to be known as Bombay halwa, Karachi halwa is the older original name. It gained considerable popularity in Mumbai, India, as Sindhi and Gujarati sweet-makers introduced it to a bigger market. Chandu Halwai, a well-known Indian sweet shop in Mumbai, was originally established in the year 1896 in Karachi, this shop is frequently credited with popularizing it. Krati writes in 2024 that; "Karachi halwa" is another renowned confection that was brought from Karachi, a city in Sindh province, as a direct result of migration brought on by the partition.

It's intriguing to trace the intricate origin of this halwa. It was created in various parts of Sindh (not exclusively in Karachi) centuries ago, as the Persian Empire expanded its influence in the region's cuisine. It may have direct influence from a halwa initially made in Turkey and called Lokum.

== Ingredients ==
It is made of corn flour, water, clarified butter or ghee and sugar. Bombay halwa is usually coloured orange, red or green and flavoured with cardamom and ghee.

To get the proper texture and consistency, the main ingredients of Karachi halwa (cornstarch, sugar, and ghee) have certain proportions that are essential for attaining the desired texture and consistency in the final product. These proportions are normally balanced in such a way that the halwa is chewy, transparent, and not excessively sticky or oily. Usually these proportions are; corn flour 1 part, sugar 2 parts and ghee 0.5 to 1 part. These proportions are slightly adjustable to make the halwa sweeter or more chewy in texture or glossy in appearance.

== Health ==
Because of the richer contents of fat and sugar the calories in 100 grams of halwa can reach 400 kcal. This estimate of the calories per 100 grams of halwa can be calculated by the fact that carbohydrates (sugar) provide 4 calories per gram, protein (nuts) provides 4 calories per gram, and fat (ghee) provides 9 calories per gram. There are very little fibers in Karachi halwa and those come from the nuts (if used). Protein contents are also very low. As it is a made of cornflour it is a gluten free dessert.

== See also ==
- Turkish delight
- Halva
