= Kesar Da Dhaba =

Vegetarian restaurant in Punjab, India

Kesar Da Dhaba is a vegetarian Punjabi dhaba in Amritsar, Punjab, India, that originated as a small restaurant selling dal and roti set up by Lala Kesar Mal, a Punjabi Hindu in Sheikhupura, a city near Lahore, in 1916. It moved to Amritsar after the partition of India in 1947. People that are said to have eaten at the restaurant include Lala Lajpat Rai, Jawaharlal Nehru, Indira Gandhi, Padmini Kolhapure, Yash Chopra and Rajesh Khanna. It is a small dhaba, in a narrow lane in Chowk Passian near Town Hall.

Its signature dish is dal makhani (dal with butter). They are also known for phirni served in earthen bowls.

Anthony Bourdain visited the restaurant as part of his Anthony Bourdain: Parts Unknown series.

Some of the scenes of Saif Ali Khan’s 2017 movie Chef were shot here.

== See also ==
- List of vegetarian and vegan restaurants
