= Gadhawa =

Gadhawa गढवा Gadawa
- Typical Village Development Committee
- Location in Nepal
- Coordinates: 27°46′38″N 82°32′34″E
- Country: Nepal
- Province: Lumbini Province
- District: Dang Deukhuri District

Population (1991)
  - Total: 7,877
- Time zone: UTC+5:45 (Nepal Time)

Gadhawa (Gadawa) is a village in the Gadhawa Rural Municipality of Dang Deukhuri District in Lumbini Province, south-western Nepal. It was, prior to September 2015, also a Village Development Committee in Dang Deukhuri District, Rapti Zone. At the time of the 2011 Nepal census the VDC had a population of 11,430 persons living in 2,176 households, up from the 2001 Nepal census of 7,877 persons living in 1,188 households.

It is surrounded by the former Gangapraspur VDC to the east, Koilabas VDC to the south, Bela VDC to the west and Chailahi VDC to the north. The North-South Damodar road runs through Gadhawa and communicates with the Indian border via Koilabas VDC and to the East-West highway (Mahendra highway) via Chailahi VDC. The majority of the population consists of Tharu, Khas Brahmin, and Yadav. There are a few Muslims. Most people are agriculturalists; however, a few are employed in small businesses.
