= Shree Siddha Baghnath Baba Dham =

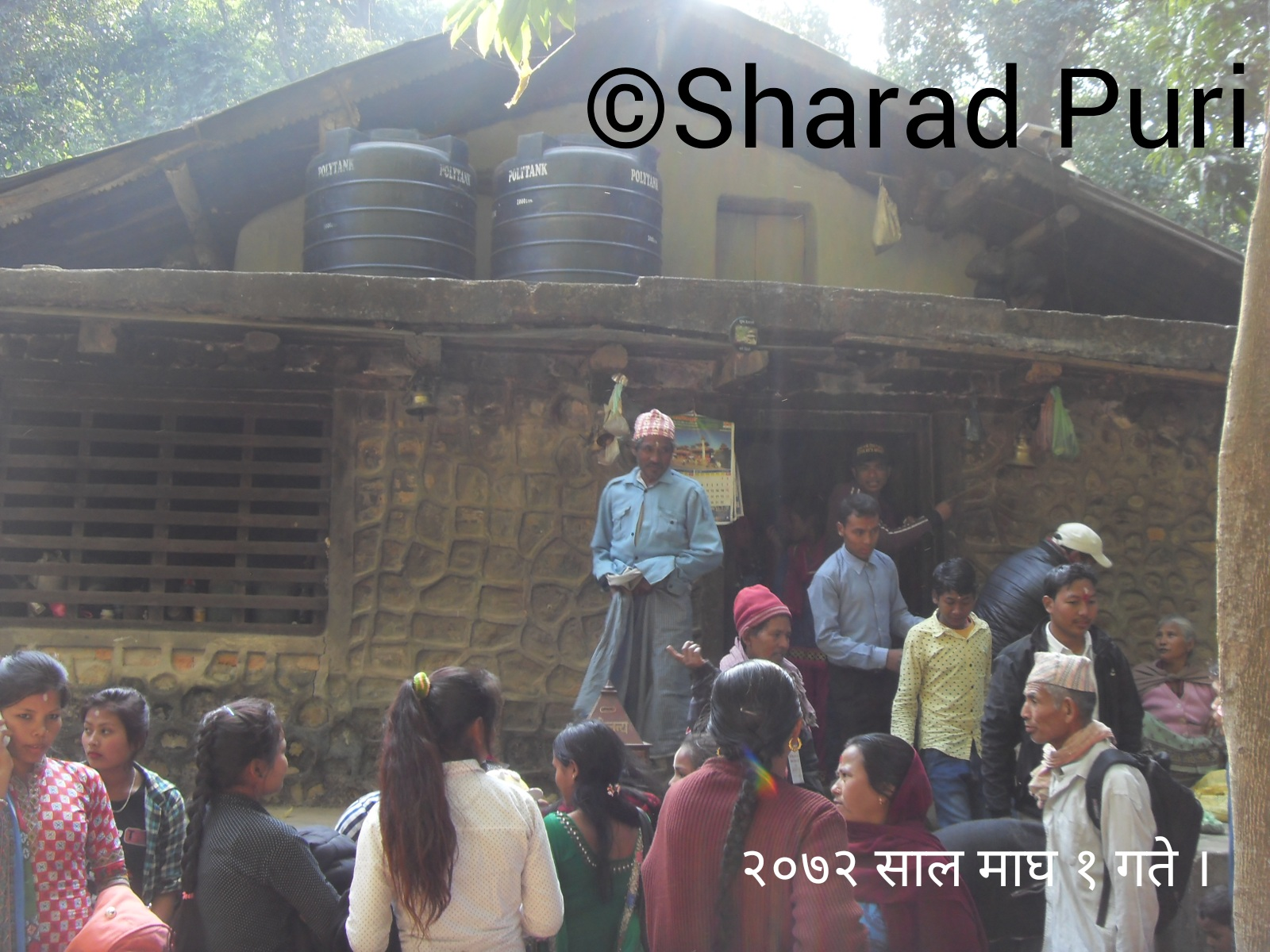
Baba's kuti.

Shree Siddha Baghnath Baba Dham Junglekuti ॥ॐ श्री सिद्ध बाघनाथ बाबा धाम जङ्गलकुटी is an Ashram or Kuti located in Gadhawa Rural Municipality ward number-3, Gobardiha Dang Deukhuri District Nepal. It is 16 km west from Kalakate and 7 km south from Gobardiha Village.

== Geography ==
It lies in dense forest of southern chure hills of Gobardiya.Geographically, the place is newly formed; formed by containing sedimentary rocks like sand, soil, small pebbles.

== History ==
This historical hermitage or Ashram was a place to practice meditation, austerity, rigor, devotion and penance by Siddha Baghnath Baba ji (Bhuwaneshwornath ji) who used to travel place to place by riding a Tiger (Bagh). This place has history of around 200 years.

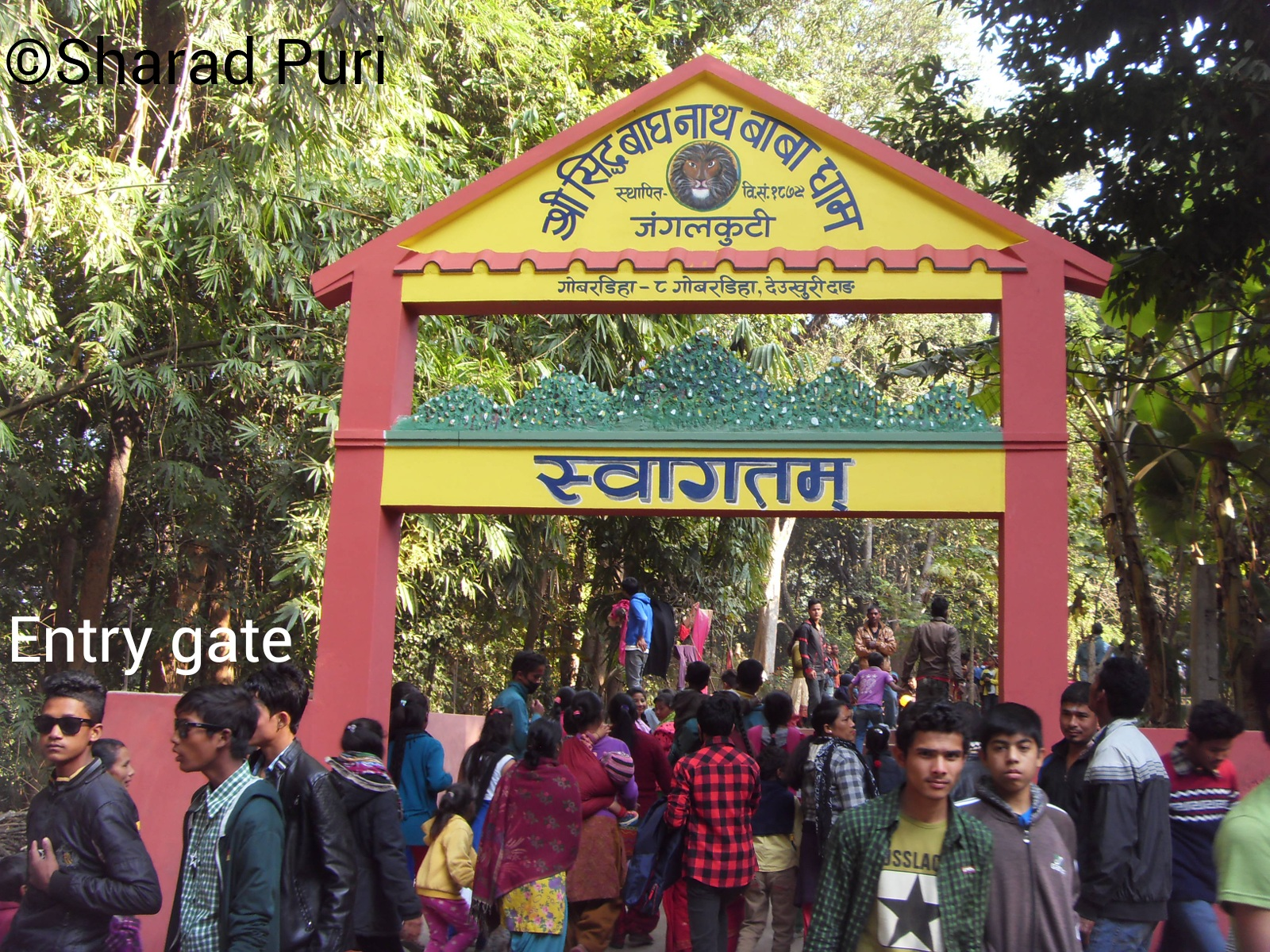
Entry gate of Siddha Baghnath Baba Junglekuti, Gobardiha-8
