= Dulaiya Dashnami Sanyasi Sampradaya =

Dulaiya Dashnami Sanyasi Sampradaya is a Dashnami community of Banghushree, dang in Nepal. They have adopted unique Hindu culture and rituals. They were believed to travel in Banghushree for the business of hospitality where they used to serve people who were returning from India. Basically, Puri are known as Dulaiya Dashnami Sanyasi Sampradaya who migrated from Dulaiya to Banghushree more than 200 years ago.

Cultural and ritual acts practiced in Dulaiya Dashnami Sanyasi Sampraday includes Kul Puja, Deba Puja, Sewan puja, Debi Puja etc.
