= Rajpur Rural Municipality =

Rajpur Rural Municipality is a municipal unit in Dang District, Lumbini Province in western Nepal. It was formed by a combination of the erstwhile Bela and Rajpur Village Development Committees. The center of the Rural Municipality is located at Gangdi.

== Geography ==
Rajpur borders India to the south and to Banke District on the west. The Rapti river forms the northern border of the municipality while there is Gadhawa Rural Municipality of Dang district on the east. Three distinct regions are present. The northern river plains region is called the Deukhuri region, the middle hills region is called the Khola region while the southern hills and plateaus form the Naka region.

== Administrative Divisions ==
Rajpur Rural Municipality is divided into seven wards.

== Demographics ==
At the time of the 2011 Nepal census, Rajpur Rural Municipality had a population of 25,061. Of these, 51.5% spoke Nepali, 24.5% Awadhi, 21.5% Tharu, 0.9% Kham, 0.8% Urdu, 0.5% Magar, 0.2% Maithili and 0.1% other languages as their first language.

In terms of ethnicity/caste, 22.0% were Tharu, 19.2% Yadav, 18.0% Magar, 14.2% Chhetri, 9.9% Kami, 2.8% Kumal, 2.7% Damai/Dholi, 2.3% Sanyasi/Dasnami, 1.5% Chamar/Harijan/Ram, 1.4% Hill Brahmin, 1.3% Thakuri, 0.9% Musalman, 0.9% Sarki, 0.4% Halwai, 0.4% Teli, 0.3% Gurung, 0.3% Majhi, 0.3% Newar, 0.2% Badi, 0.2% Kathabaniyan, 0.2% Kumhar, 0.1% Terai Brahmin, 0.1% Gaine, 0.1% Gharti/Bhujel, 0.1% Kurmi and 0.3% others.

In terms of religion, 96.8% were Hindu, 2.2% Christian, 0.9% Muslim and 0.1% Buddhist.

In terms of literacy, 60.1% could read and write, 3.0% could only read and 36.8% could neither read nor write.
