= Badahara =

Coordinates: 27°48′51″N 82°42′43″E

Badahara (Badhahara, Badhara) (बडहरा) is the name of a village in Dang, Lumbini Province, Nepal. It is now located in Gadhawa Rural Municipality ward number 1, but before the consolidation of four VDCs into Gadhawa Rural Municipality in 2015, it was part of the Gobardiya, village development committee (VDC), ward No. 2.

Badahara is located in the Mid-Western Terai Eco-Zone of Nepal.
