= Banghushree =

Banghushree (बनघुश्री), sometimes Banghusri (बनघुस्री) or Bankhorsi (बनखोर्सी), is a village located in Gadhawa Rural Municipality ward number 1 of Dang Deukhuri District, Nepal. It is one of the oldest villages of Deukhuri Valley.

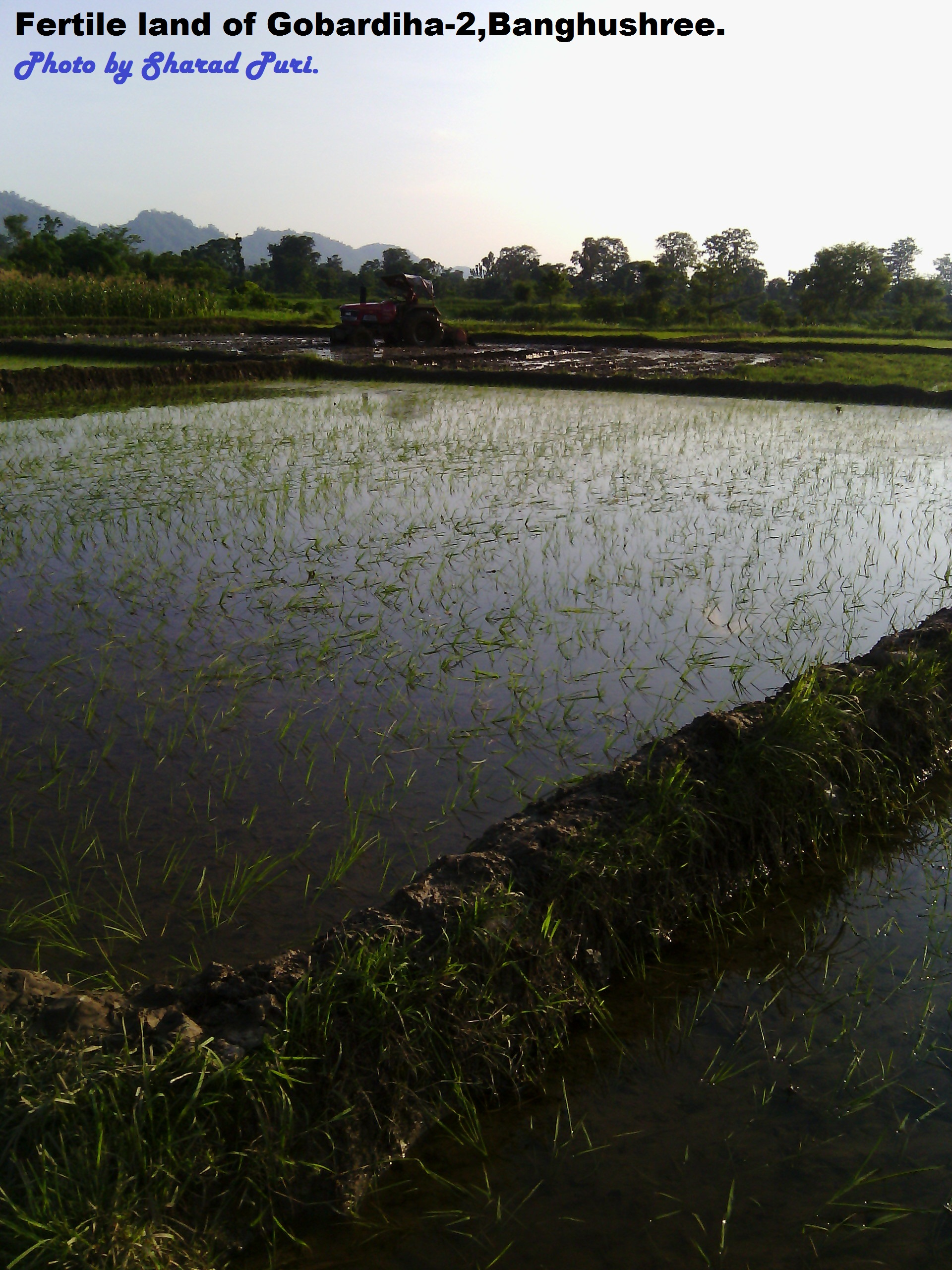
Agricultural land of Banghushree.

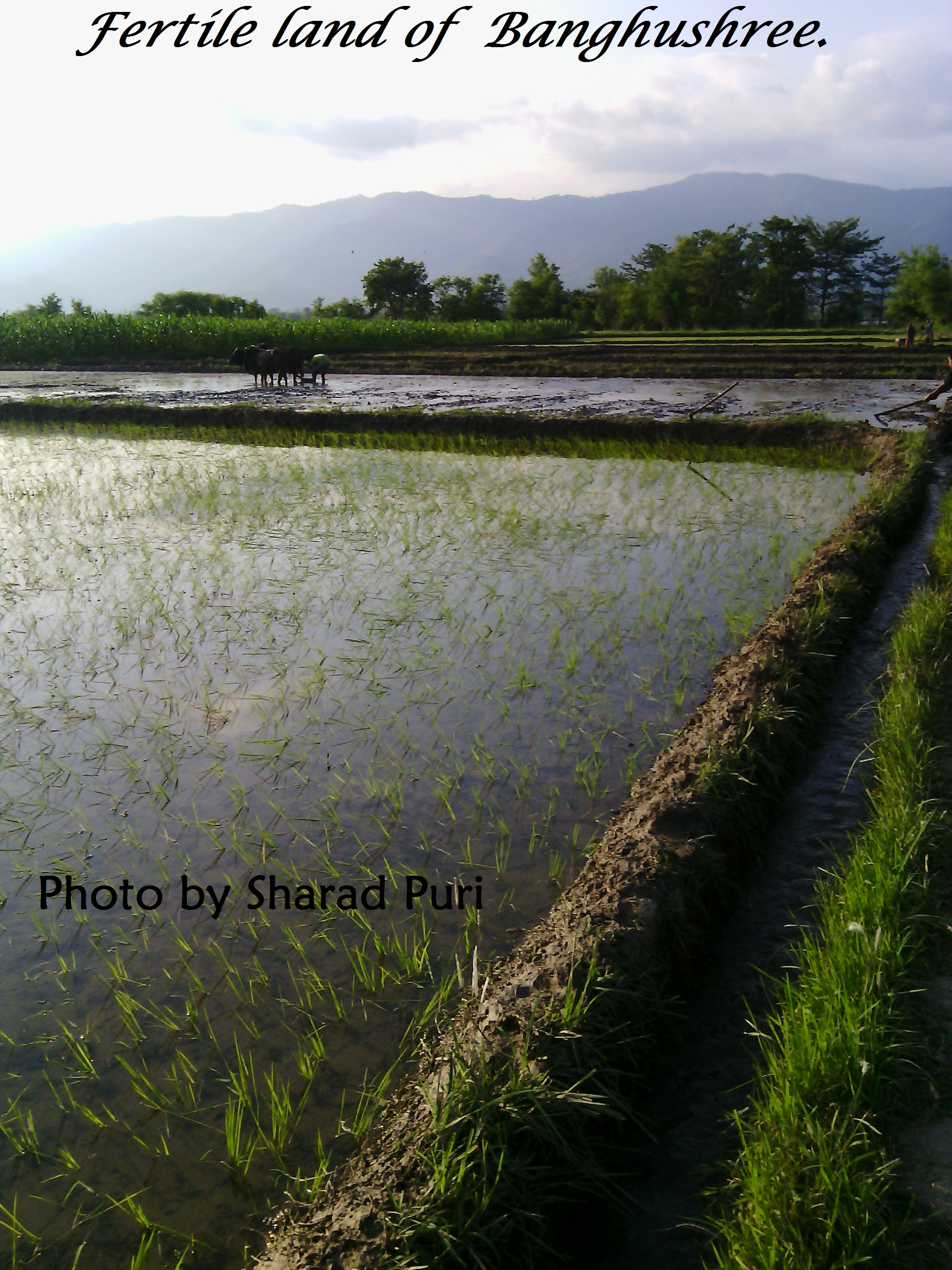
Fertile land of Banghushree.

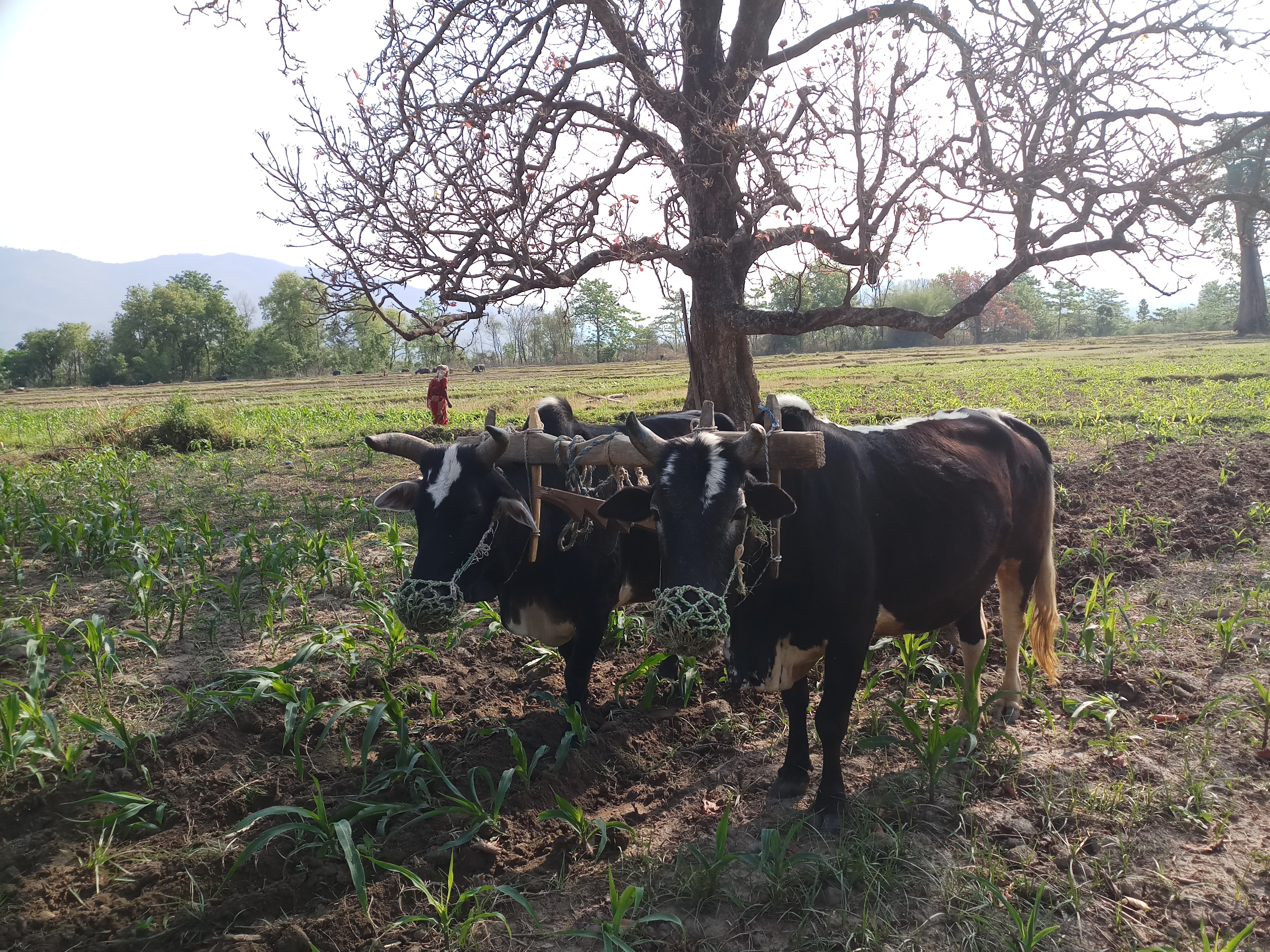
Traditional farming in Banghushree.

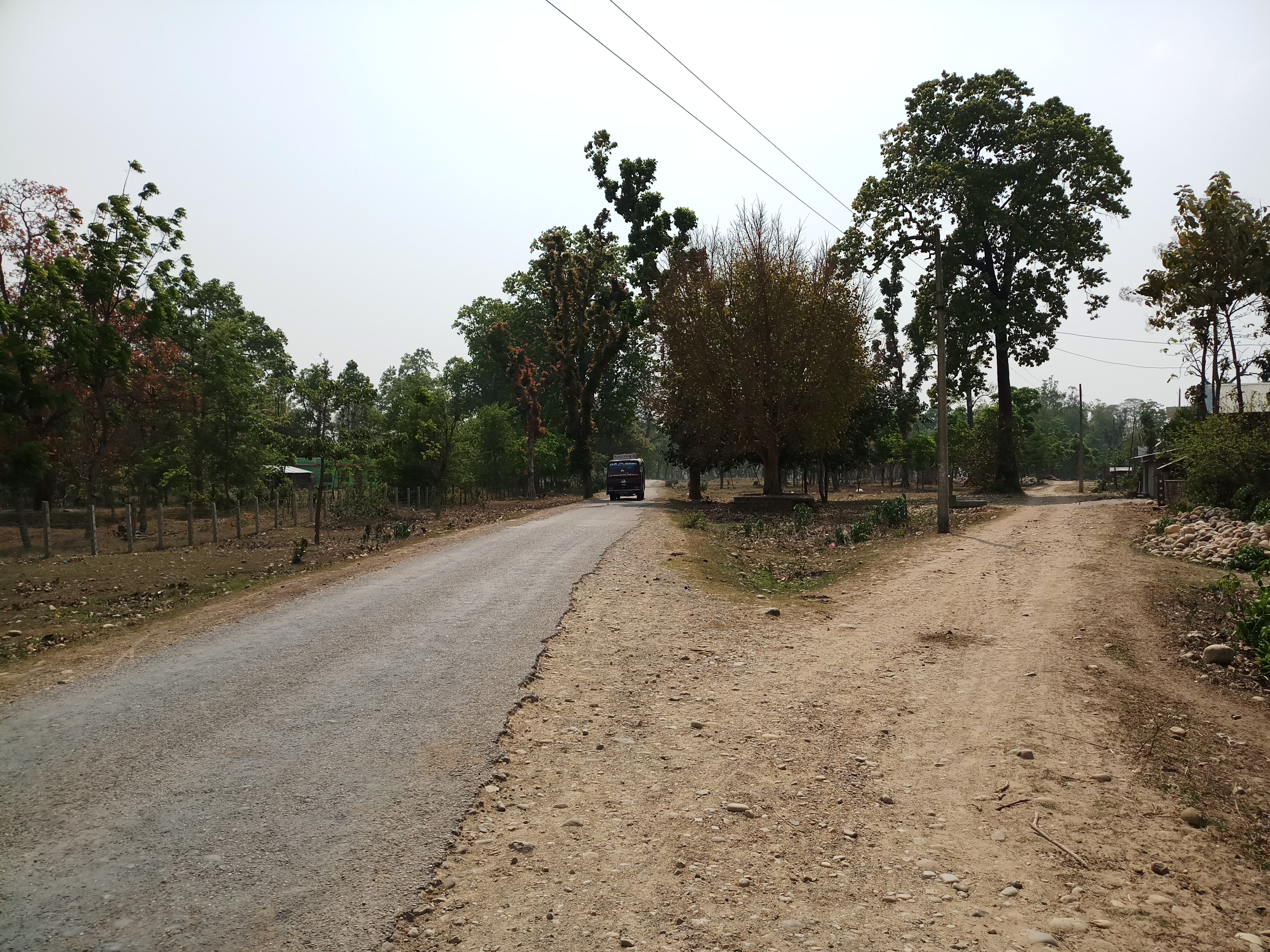
Damodar Road, Banghushree

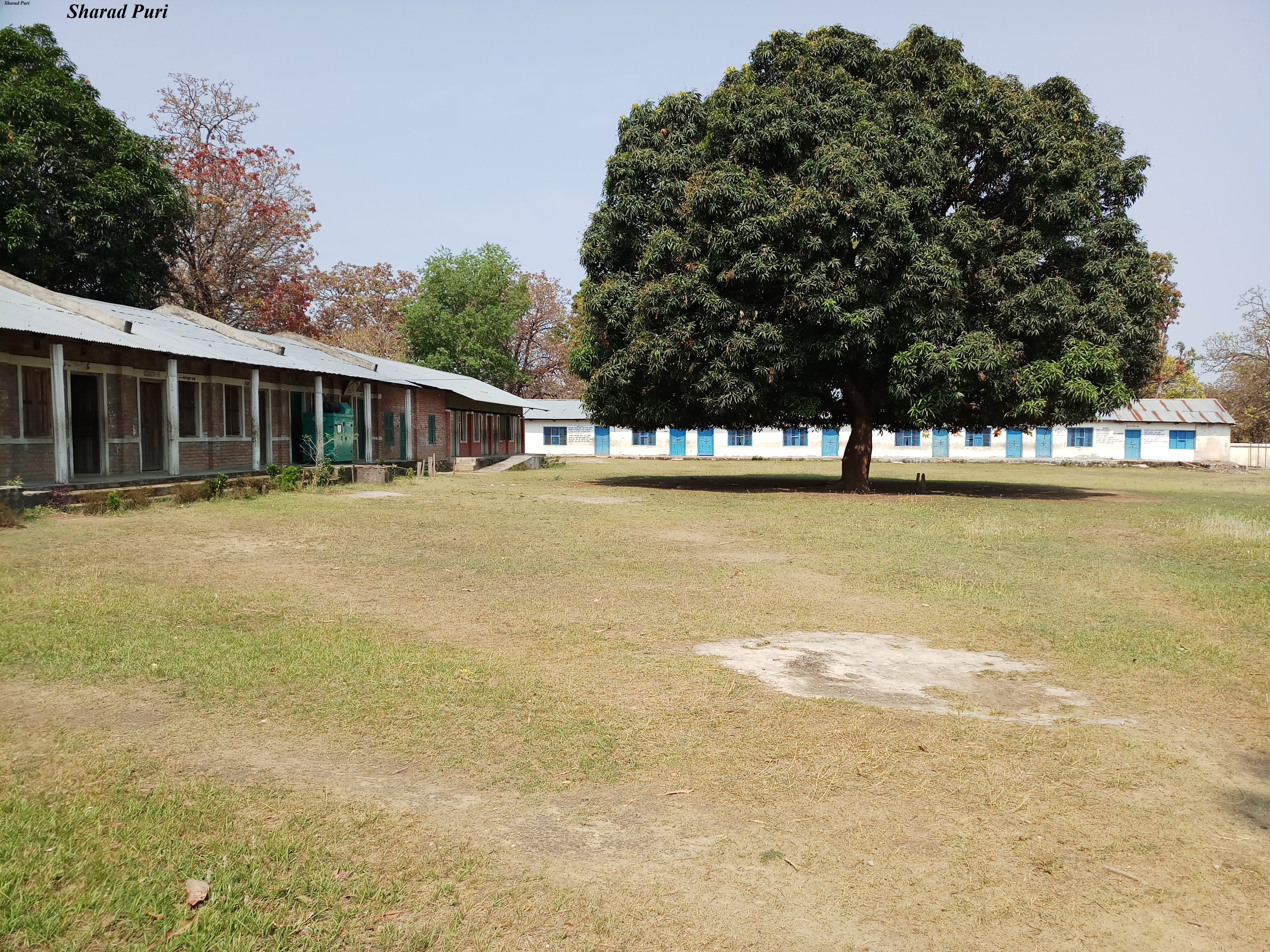
Nimna maadhyamik Vidyalaya, Banghushree.

== Introduction ==
Agriculture is the main occupation of people and no industrial colony has been established. Height from sea level: south- 310 meters, north- 290 meters. Total households-more than 300 including Banbari, Population- more than 1100.Topographic map of sheet number- 2782038D. This village is known for its higher fertile land. The village is situated on the northern and southern sides of two roads: Damodar road and Dulaiya road.

People there mainly cultivate grains, vegetables, herbs, and plants, many people are attracted to livestock production and processing. This village holds four conservation areas:Janashakti samudayik ban, Banshakti samudayik ban, Mahila ban and Kharkatti conservation area. N.L. livestock has been established there intending to industrialize in production of livestock.

This village has one school named Nimna Madhyamika Vidyalaya, which was established with the initiation of Dulaiya in 2025 B.S. This government school currently holds nearly 400 children of age between 5 and 13 years old. School children come from nearby villages such as Banghushree, Badahara, Patringa, Bauraha. At present, the school is running with a new committee.

Bauraha khola, which runs from south to north, is lying on the west side of this Banghushree village. In the time of monsoon season, it causes a huge loss of property. Upper large catchment area where high precipitation in monsoon season results in devastating flash flood each year which turns into a nightmare for the locals of Banghushree. Bauraha khola, which generally carries mud, boulders, and much debris due to steep slope, sweeps fertile land of Banghushree each year. Land of Banghushree, in terms of geology, is new; formed by sedimentation of sand, soil, and small pebbles. Many kinds of sedimentary rocks are, therefore, found there.

The names of dry streams that must be crossed to reach Banghushree village from Kalakate are listed below:

1. Kalakate khola
2. Bhalu khola
3. Bire khola
4. Forester khola
5. Kolte khola
6. Budi khola
7. Lahure kate khola
8. Tharunijhundi khola
9. Parshampure khola

The distance from Kalakate to the demarcation between Malmala and Banghushree is nearly 3.5 kilometers.

== History ==
Banghushree was forest before the presence of Dulaiya Dashnami Sanyasi Sampradaya. They made the place suitable for residency at the time of Anglo-Nepalese War by clearing the land of Banghushree. Dulaiya arrived at Banghushree in 1870 Vikram Samvat. Historical monuments, some left documents, and some historians indicate that Dulaiyas houses were built there for Homestay. Nepalese workers from India, while returning to their home, used to live there. At that time, the Business of Dulaiyas in the sector of Hospitality was sound. There was no bridge on West Rapti River and people used to travel through Banghushree. Dulaiyas used to serve the literate guest in different ways. Dulaiyas had built separate houses for literate guests and they used to tell guests to teach their children instead of paying fees. Banghushree village was a center of attraction for migrating people for their permanent residency because this village had fertile land, along with this there was a proper water supply, reliable energy source, and proper management of transportation than other nearby villages.

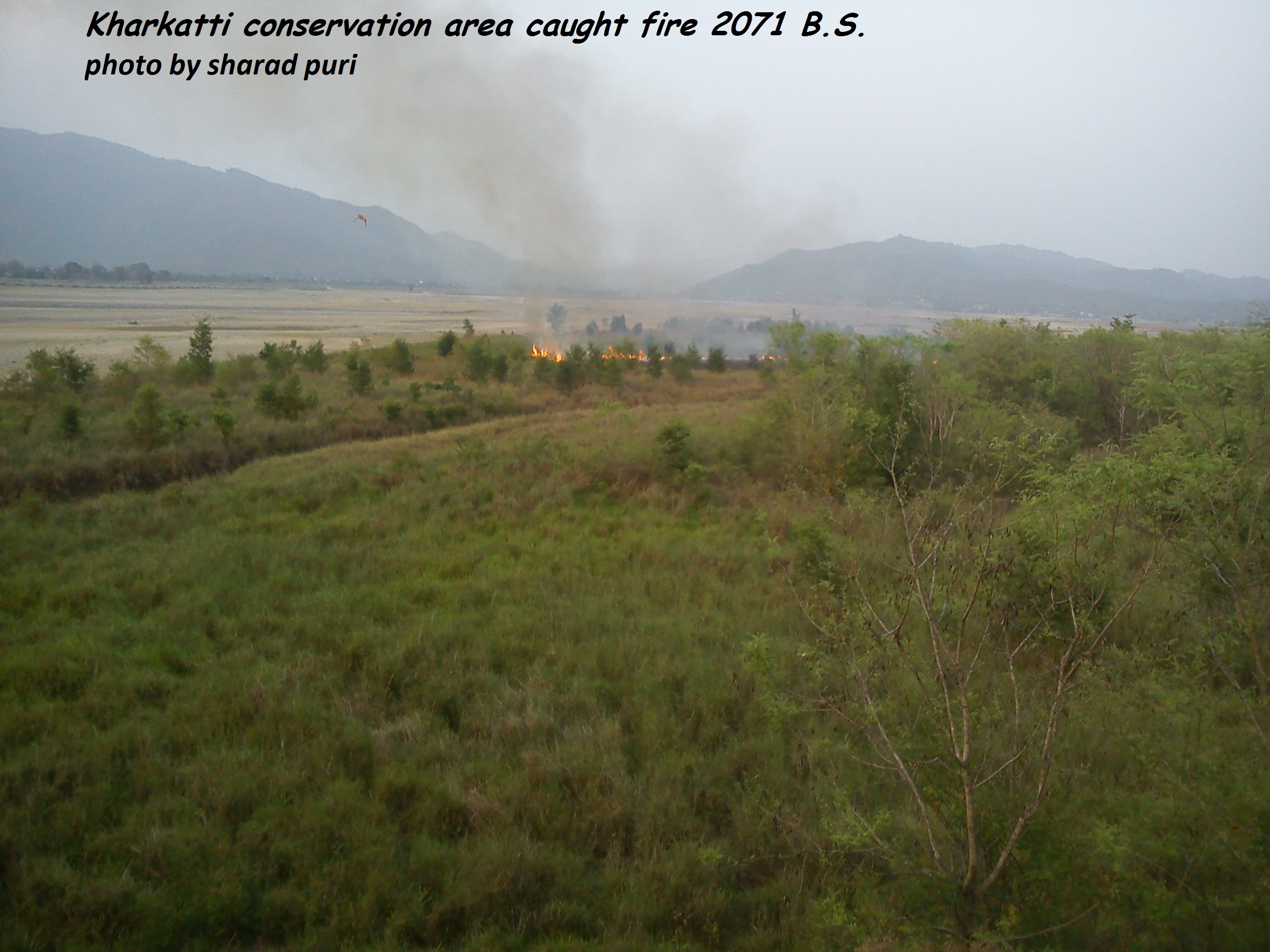
Kharkatti of Banghushree.

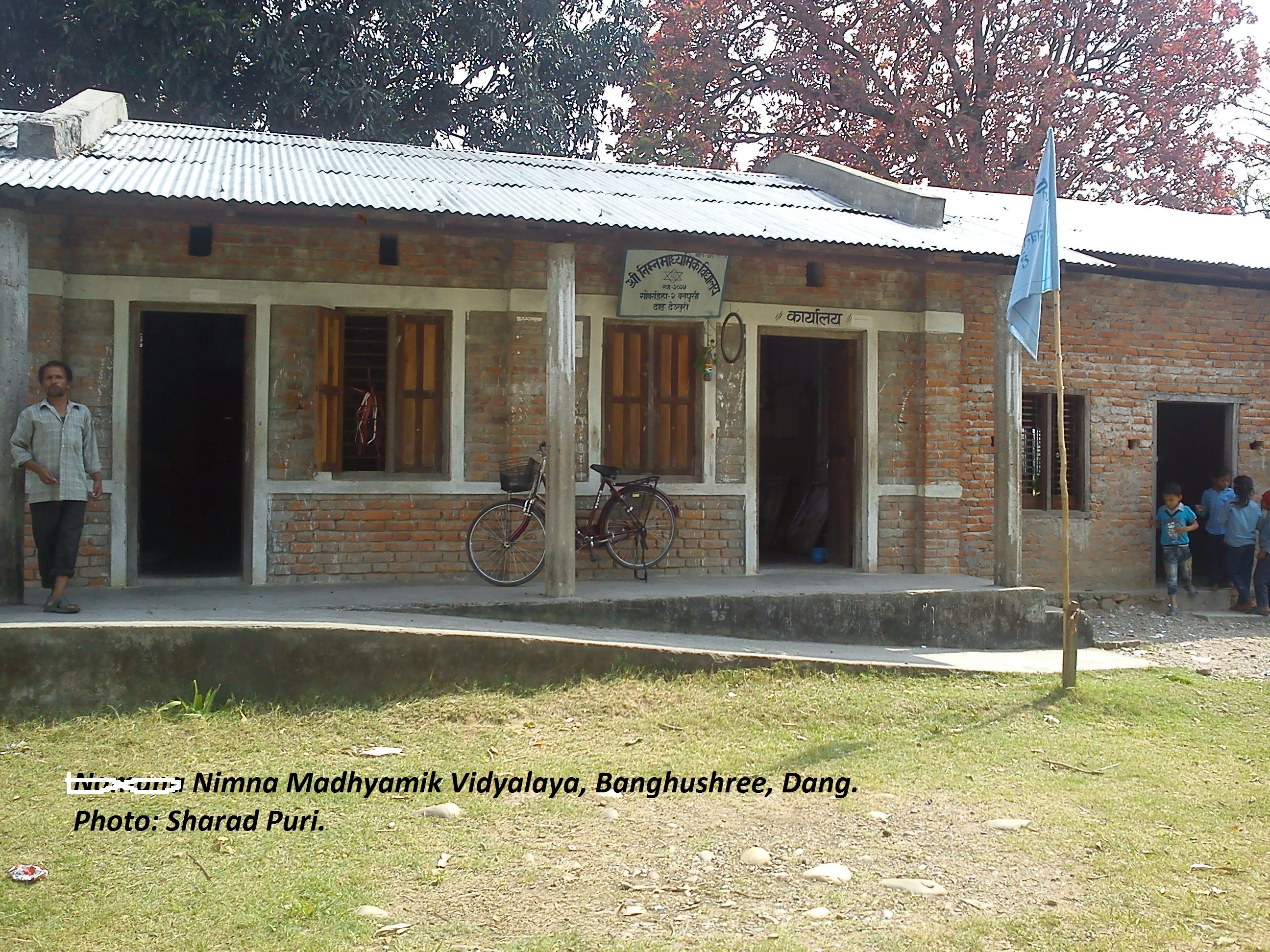
Nimna Madhyamik Vidyalaya, Banghushree.

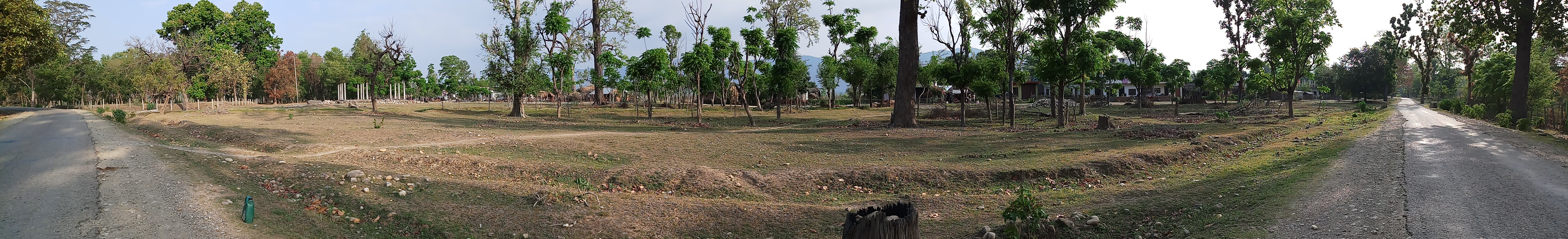
Panorama view of Banghushree.

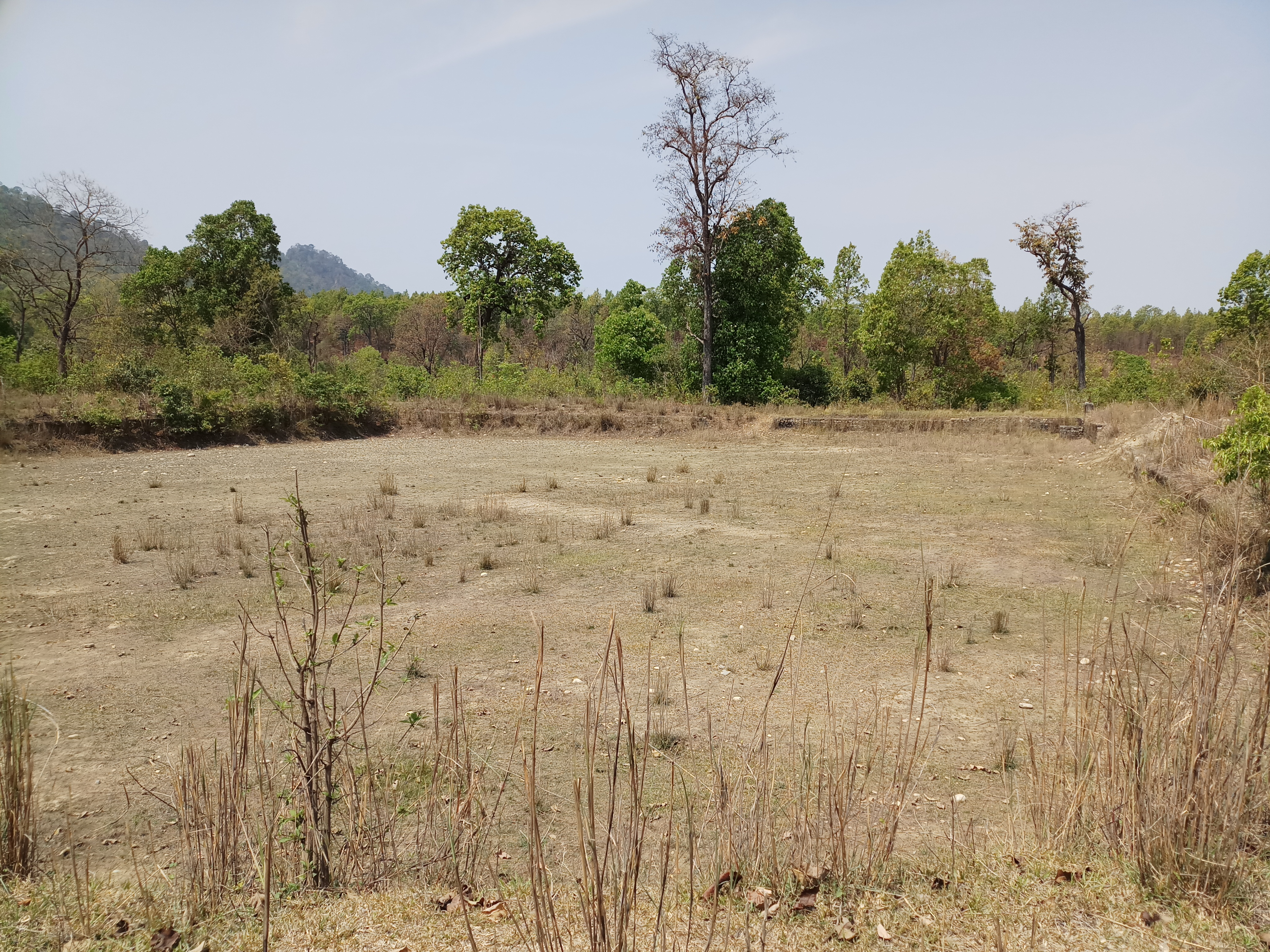
Jakhera Taal, Banghushree.

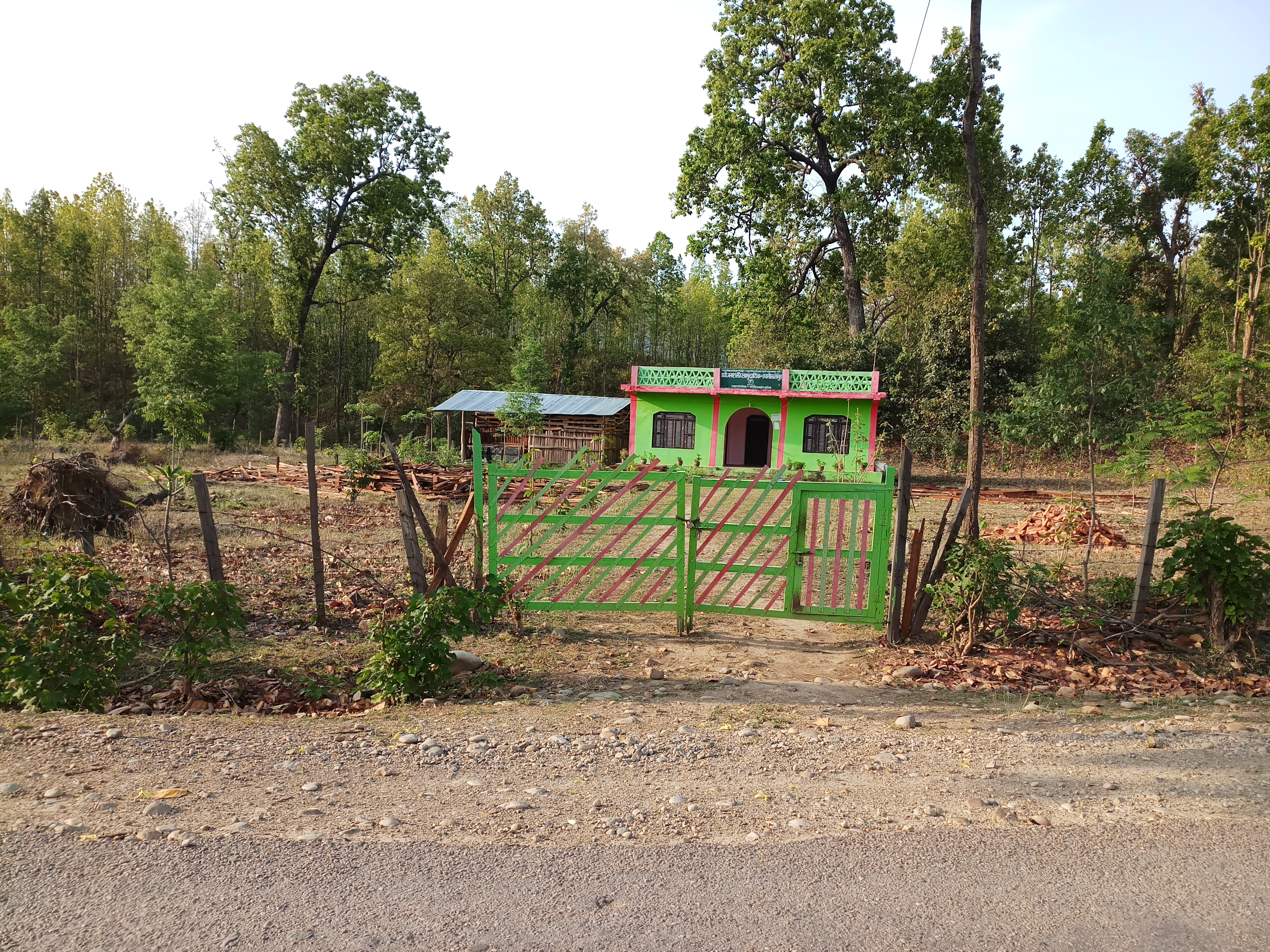
Office of Janashakti Saamudayik Ban.

=== Some important places within Banghushree village ===
1. Maajhghat (माझघाट): It is the national forest between Banghushree and Banbari
2. Putali Danda (पुतली डाँडा): This place was swept by Bauraha khola. This place does not exist now.
3. Kolyaad (कोल्याड)
4. Parshampur (पर्शमपुर)
5. Chiyan Danda (चियान डाँडा )
6. Banshakti Thaan (बनशक्ति थान)
7. Kharkatti (खरकट्टी): Kharkatti is a conservation site located towards the northern side of the village. #Cliche: Aware Banghushreli people made their attempts to fight flood, landslide, and soil erosion by establishing a committee that launched a series of projects with the help of local hands within this area to conserve fertile soil for more than two decades ago.
8. Jakhera (जखेरा)
9. Kula Baandha (कुला बाँध)
10. Bagaldondh (बगाल डोण)
11. Pakhe Danda (पखे डाँडा)
