= Rajpur, Dang =

Coordinates: 27°50′N 82°13′E

Rajpur, Nepal राजपुर
- Village Development Committee
- Interactive map of Rajpur, Nepal
- Country: Nepal
- Province: Lumbini Province
- District: Dang Deokhuri District

Population (1991)
  - Total: 8,811
- Time zone: UTC+5:45 (Nepal Time)

Rajpur is a town and Village Development Committee in Dang Deokhuri District in Lumbini Province of south-western Nepal. At the time of the 1991 Nepal census it had a population of 8,811 persons residing in 1454 individual households.

It has been merged with the adjoining Bela Village Development Committee to form a new Rajpur Rural Municipality.
