= Sewan puja =

Sewan puja (Hindi: सेवान पुजा) Sometimes Banshakti Thaan Puja। बनशक्ति देवता पुजा। is a kind of puja in Hindu culture of banghushree where people of this village gathered on the specific holy place and sacrifice the life of goat/Sheep or cock in believing that God of the forest will provide security to their castles. They also believe that worshiping this way causes rain in time. All the people have great faith in this holy function. They have planted on bare land and registered in government as a community forest with the name Banshakti samudayik ban to show their respect towards the forest.

Sewan puja is a symbol of respect for humans to other animals and plants. This puja starts each year right before monsoon season.

== See also ==
- Animal sacrifice in Hinduism
