= Chailahi =

Chailahi चैलाही Chailai
- Village Development Committee
- Location in Nepal
- Coordinates: 27.87°N 82.53°E
- Country: Nepal
- Province: Lumbini Province
- District: Dang Deokhuri District

Population (1991)
  - Total: 10,800
- Time zone: UTC+5:45 (Nepal Time)

Chailahi is a town and Village Development Committee in Dang Deokhuri District in Lumbini Province of south-western Nepal. At the time of the 1991 Nepal census it had a population of 10,800 persons living in 1485 individual households. It lies in the east west highway and lied 23 km east to districts capital Ghorahi.

== Media ==
To Promote local culture Chailahi has three Community radio Stations. They are Radio Deukhuri - 105.8 MHz, Radio Naya Yug - 107.3 MHz and Radio Highway - 103.5 MHz.
