= Bela, Dang =

Bela बेला
- Village Development Committee
- Location in Nepal
- Coordinates: 28°21′N 81°17′E
- Country: Nepal
- Province: Lumbini Province
- District: Dang Deokhuri District

Population (2011)
  - Total: 11,245
- Time zone: UTC+5:45 (Nepal Time)

Bela is a Village Development Committee in Dang Deokhuri District in Lumbini Province of south-western Nepal. The village borders Balrampur district of India in the south. At the time of the 2011 Nepal census it had a population of 11,245 persons living in 2,055 individual households. The main residents are Tharu, Yadavs, Chhetri, Magar, Bahun, Dalit, and Muslims.

It has been merged with the adjoining Rajpur Village Development Committee to form Rajpur Rural Municipality.
