= Gadhawa Rural Municipality =

Coordinates: 27°46′48″N 82°31′48″E

Gadhawa Rural Municipality गढवा गाउँपालिका
- Rural Municipality
- Motto(s): "Better Education, Health, and Employment are the foundations of a prosperous Gadhawa Rural Municipality"-(unofficial translation)
- Interactive map of Gadhawa Rural Municipality
- Country: Nepal
- Province: Lumbini Province
- District: Dang District
- Established: February 23, 2017 AD

Government
  - Type: Local level (Village executive)
  - Chairperson: Yam Narayan Sharma Pokhrel
  - Vice- Chairperson: Sharada Kumari Chaudhary

Area
  - Total: 358.57 km^{2} (138.44 sq mi)

Population (2021)
  - Total: 46,275
  - Density: 129.05/km^{2} (334.25/sq mi)
- Time zone: UTC+5:45 (Nepal Time)
- Postal codes: 22404 and 22405
- Area code: 082
- Website: https://www.gadhawamun.gov.np/

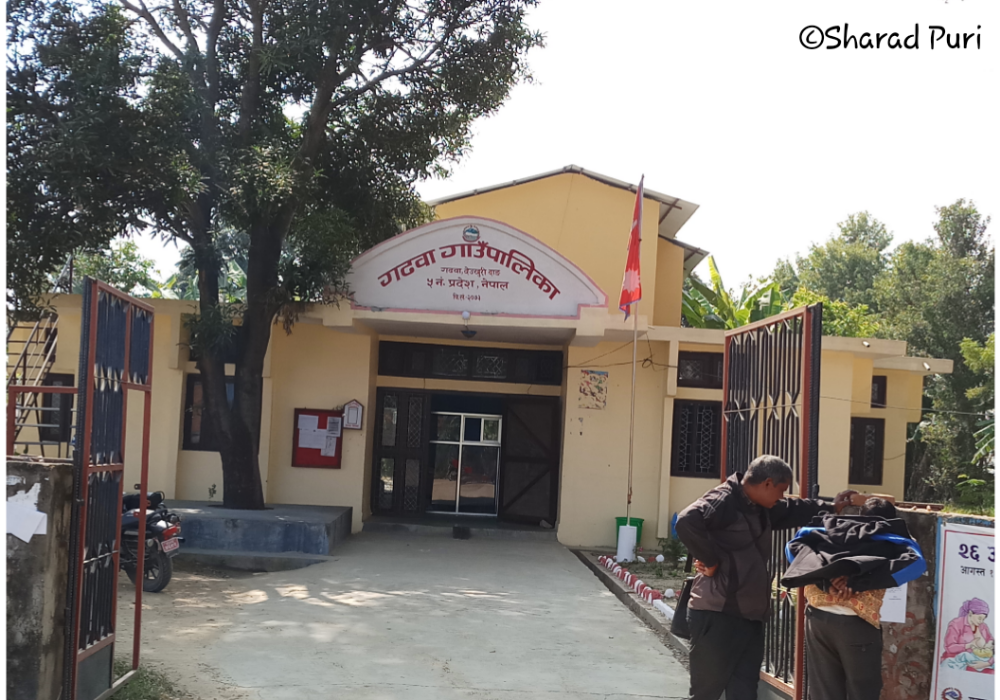
Rural municipality former Office

Gadhawa Rural Municipality (Nepali: गढवा गाउँपालिका sometimes गडवा गाउँपालिका) is located in Deukhuri valley of Dang district of Lumbini Province, Nepal. This rural municipality was declared on Falgun 12, 2073 Vikram Samvat. It lies from 195 meter to 885 meter above sea level. The former Gadhawa VDC office was the administrative center of Gadhawa Rural Municipality for 4 years of its inception and then the office of the executive was moved to a new building. According to the preliminary report of population census 2078, Gadhawa Rural Municipality has 46275 population where male and female comprises 22650 (48.95%) and 23625 (51.05%) population respectively. During local level restructuring, this rural municipality was formed by annexing former four VDCs named Gobardiya, Gangapraspur, Gadhawa and Koilabas. This rural municipality has a 358.57 square km area and is divided into 8 wards. It is surrounded by Arghakhanchi and Kapilvastu districts from the east, Rajapur Rural Municipality from the west, Lamahi Municipality and Rapti Rural Municipality in the north, and India in the south direction.

== Demographics ==
At the time of the 2011 Nepal census, Gadhawa Rural Municipality had a population of 38,663. Of these, 45.1% spoke Tharu, 41.1% Nepali, 9.0% Awadhi, 2.8% Urdu, 0.9% Magar, 0.5% Kham, 0.2% Hindi, 0.1% Doteli, 0.1% Maithili, 0.1% Newar and 0.1% other languages as their first language.

In terms of ethnicity/caste, 45.5% were Tharu, 9.0% Chhetri, 8.4% Magar, 8.3% Kumal, 7.7% Yadav, 5.5% Hill Brahmin, 3.3% Kami, 3.1% Musalman, 1.9% Sanyasi/Dasnami, 1.7% Damai/Dholi, 1.3% Sarki, 0.7% Thakuri, 0.4% Bote, 0.4% Gurung, 0.4% Newar, 0.3% other Dalit, 0.3% Majhi, 0.2% Halwai, 0.2% Kathabaniyan, 0.2% Lodh, 0.2% Teli, 0.1% Badi, 0.1% Chamar/Harijan/Ram, 0.1% Dusadh/Paswan/Pasi, 0.1% Gharti/Bhujel, 0.1% Hajam/Thakur, 0.1% Kahar, 0.1% Rai, 0.1% Tamang, 0.1% other Terai and 0.2% others.

In terms of religion, 95.7% were Hindu, 3.1% Muslim, 1.2% Christian, 0.1% Buddhist and 0.1% others.

In terms of literacy, 62.9% could read and write, 2.0% could only read and 35.0% could neither read nor write.
