= Gangapraspur =

Gangapraspur गंगाप्रसपुर
- Village Development Committee
- Location in Nepal
- Coordinates: 27.82°N 82.58°E
- Country: Nepal
- Province: Lumbini Province
- District: Dang Deokhuri District

Population (1991)
  - Total: 8,042
- Time zone: UTC+5:45 (Nepal Time)

Gangapraspur is a town and Village Development Committee in Dang Deokhuri District in Lumbini Province of south-western Nepal. At the time of the 1991 Nepal census it had a population of 8,042 persons living in 1098 individual households.
