= Gobardiya =

Gobardiha गोबरडिहा
- Village Development Committee
- Nickname: Gobardiya
- Motto: "developing village is the development of nation"
- Location in Nepal
- Coordinates: 27.77°N 82.67°E
- Country: Nepal
- Province: Lumbini Province
- District: Dang Deukhuri District

Government
  - Type: democratic republic
- Elevation: 300 m (980 ft)

Population (2011)
  - Total: 15,322
- Time zone: UTC+5:45 (Nepal Time)

Gobardiha is a village of Gadawa Village Council in Dang Deukhuri District in Lumbini Province of south-western Nepal. At the time of the 2011 Nepal census, it had a population of 15,322, where the total female population was 7991 and the male population was 7331 in 2,873 individual households.
