= Women in business =

Women's participation in, and contribution to, business

The phrase women in business refers to female businesspeople who hold positions, particularly leadership in the fields of commerce, business, and entrepreneurship. It advocates for their increased participation in business.

Increased participation of women in business can be important for variation in business development, ideas, and business products. Participation also encourages the development of social networks and supports that have positive repercussions for women and for their social environment.

The status of women in business varies significantly around the world. Sometimes a lack of adequate business capital, female education, and training programs in the use of technology can mean women are more constrained by their social and political environment than men.

== History ==
=== Antiquity ===
The earliest known well-documented businesswoman is the Sumerian Ama-e who was involved in various trades and real estate investments (circa 2330 BC).

Another example of a well-documented businesswoman is an Assyrian businesswoman of the city of Assur named Ahaha, who operated in the 1800s BC. She is known for pursuing the resolution to an issue of financial fraud committed against her.

Funeral monuments, inscriptions and other archeological remains demonstrate that women could be active within a number of different professions and in the business world: from builders to factory workers, from market salers of anyting from beans to nails to perfumers, business agent and medical doctor. The Ancient Roman city of Pompeii, which gives an unusually rich documentation of women's range of professions and business opportunities, gives a number of examples of individual Roman women with a wide range of professions. A number of businesswomen are noted among the citizens of Pompeii. Among them were Naevoleia Tyche, a former slave, businesswoman and investor, who became rich enough to build a magnificent grave monument; the real estate owner and landlord Julia Felix; the money lender Faustilla; the vine producer Caesia Helpis, whose vine were sold by the female vine merchant Vibia; the fish sauce seller Umbricia Fortunata; the perfumer Gavia Severa; and the very successful Eumachia, who was both the owner of a factory as well as a Priestess and the Benefactor of a professional Guild organization.

=== Medieval and early modern age ===
In Medieval Europe, the majority of business professions in the Medieval city was monopolised by the Guilds. The Guilds could differ from city to city, but the vast majority of them did not admit women as members. However, the widows of guild members were by custom allowed by the Guild to continue the business of their late husband. Hence almost all businesswomen in the Middle Ages were widows. Nevertheless, it was not uncommon with successful businesswomen in the Medieval Europea cities, such as Gertrud Morneweg, who in a typical way took over the substantial banking business of her late spouse in the Hanseatic city of Lübeck in 1286, and Jeanne la Fouacière of France, who dominated the linen trade in Paris in the late 13th and early 14th-century.

The Guild system continued in Europe until the 19th century, as did the system of European businesswomen mostly being widows who inherited the business of their late husband. However, during the early modern age, the Guild system was undermined by more and more new professions that were not included in the Guild system. Early modern Europe had many examples of rich and successful businesswomen. Gracia Mendes Nasi (1510–1569) was a Sephardi Jewish businesswoman who became one of the wealthiest and most influential women of Renaissance Europe, managing a business banking and trading empire, Casa Mendes-Benveniste, which operated throughout Europe and the Mediterranean.

In the 18th century, the French fashion merchant Rose Bertin (1747–1813) became an internationally famous French fashion designer and is widely credited with having brought fashion and haute couture to the forefront of popular culture, being the fashion designer of Queen Marie Antoinette.

=== 19th and 20th centuries ===
In the 19th century, the Guild system in Europe was abolished. This made it legally possible for all women, as well as men, with ideas and funds necessary to start a and develop a business enterprise from the start. Businesswomen therefore no longer had to be widows who inherited the business from their late husband, but could now be unmarried women, who started a business from the start. The century can give many examples of pioneering self-made businesswomen, such as the flower seller Madame Prevost of Paris, and the perfurmer Antoinette Nording (1814–1887) of Sweden.

However, despite the abolition of the Guild system, the 19th century was still a problematic time period for a woman to start a business. Married women were under legal guardianship, so in practice, the new freedom to start ta business was primarily open to unmarried women and widows.

In parallel, there were prejudices against women being active in business during the Victorian era, as the ideal for Women in the Victorian era was that of domesticity, and not a woman involved in public life and high business, where she would have to deal with men.

During the 20th century, women were technically legally given the same rights as men to participate in business. The century gives many examples of successful businesswomen who achieved high positions in business all over the world. However, informal hindrances such as prejudices and discrimination remained a factor.

== Women in corporate leadership ==
Right now, around the world, only 28% of leadership roles are held by women. That means the vast majority of decisions impacting our communities, economies, and environment are being made without equal representation from half the population.

In 2014, Peterson Institute for International Economics surveyed nearly 22,000 companies across the world. They found almost 60% had no female board members. Just over 50% had no female C-suite executives, and fewer than 5% had a female CEO. The results varied across countries: Norway, Latvia, Slovenia, and Bulgaria had at least 20% female representation at senior executive and board level. Japan, however, had only 2% female representation at board level and 2.5% at senior executive level.

The report on their survey, published in 2016, found having more women in overall executive positions correlated to greater profitability at organizations: "Going from having no women in corporate leadership (the CEO, the board, and other C-suite positions) to a 30% female share is associated with a one-percentage-point increase in net margin — which translates to a 15% increase in profitability for a typical firm."

A 2015 study of 400 female C-suite executives by Ernst & Young and ESPN found that there was a positive correlation between athletics and corporate success. Over 52% of C-suite executives played competitive sports, compared to 39% of women at lower management levels. of the executives included on Fortune's 2017 list of Most Powerful Women, 65% played competitive sports in high school, college, or both.

In 2023, the United Nations Entity for Gender Equality and the Empowerment of Women released a report summarizing the global state of women in leadership positions. The report covered data from 165 countries, and concluded that while women are catching up in terms of education, women are still "underrepresented in management positions in the workplace".

=== Corporate leadership in the United States ===
As of February 2023, in the US, women hold 29.2% of senior-level positions in S&P 500 companies (of which 8.2% are CEO positions). There are approximately 2 women per board; the average S&P 500 board consists of 11 members. This is despite women being 46.8% of the workforce, and controlling more than 50% of personal wealth in the US along with approximately 75% of household spending. One in nine corporations on the Fortune 500 list still do not include any women on their board.

Women led 55 Fortune 500 companies on the 2026 list, or 11% of the total, up from 53 (10.6%) on the 2023 list. Women also held 30.4% of Fortune 500 board seats in 2022, up from 9.6% in 1995.

50/50 Women on Boards, established in 2010 to advocate for an increase of female positions at board level and greater board level gender equality, states that as of December 2022 women held 28.4% of the Russell 3000 Index company board seats, with women of color holding only 7% of seats. The 28.4% figure represents a 1.7 percentage-point increase from December 2021.

Catalyst, a US-based non-profit research organization, reported that having a higher percentage of female board directors was positively associated with companies' scores on four of six Corporate Social Performance dimensions: environment, community, customers, and supply chain. Catalyst also found a positive correlation between companies' board diversity and philanthropic giving.

Given the projected talent deficit that will follow the retirement of millions of 'Baby Boomer' managers and executives over the next 20 years, female leaders may be seen by an increasing number of employers as an untapped source of talent, experience and senior-management leadership. However, a 2018 study showed female CEOs are 45% more likely to be fired than their male counterparts, even if they are doing a good job.

Despite gains in overall representation, women continue to face structural barriers to advancement within corporate hierarchies. Research has identified a phenomenon known as the "broken rung", which is the gap that emerges at the very first step from entry-level to manager. According to the ninth annual Women in the Workplace report by McKinsey & Company and LeanIn.org (2023), for every 100 men promoted from entry level to manager, only 87 women were promoted. This disparity was even larger for women of color, where only 73 were promoted per every 100 men.

== Women as entrepreneurs ==
Share of firms with female top managers by region

In the 59 economies included in the Global Entrepreneurship Monitor research project, female entrepreneurship ranges from just over 1.5% to 45.4% of the adult female population. Although entrepreneurial activity among women is highest in emerging economies (45.5%), the proportion of all female entrepreneurs varies considerably: from 16% in South Korea to 55% in Ghana (the only economy with more female entrepreneurs). Moreover, in many emerging economies, women are now starting a business faster than men, making significant contributions to job creation and economic growth. Women are also more likely to start businesses focused on sustainability.

=== Developing countries ===
A disproportionate share of female-owned businesses in developing countries today are either small or medium enterprises, which often do not mature as a result of negative growth and poverty. Understanding the specific barriers women's businesses face and providing solutions to address them is necessary to further leverage the economic power of women for growth and the attainment of development goals.

==== Nigeria ====
Nigeria is currently the leading economy in Africa and holds much potential growth for female entrepreneurs. Women in leadership roles do not significantly differ from men in Nigeria, indicating there is significant growth potential once barriers to entry have been removed.

==== Kazakhstan ====
The government of Kazakhstan supports the development of female-led small and medium businesses. For example, in cooperation with EBRD, Kazakhstan executes the Women in Business program. The budget of the program is $50 million. Empowerment of Women in the Corporate Sector is an international forum held in Astana, Kazakhstan. 44% of all businesses in Kazakhstan are female-owned and contribute to Kazakhstan's economic development and modernization.

In order to support women and women's organizations with a view to sustainable and inclusive development, Kazakhstan held the OSCE-supported Second International Women's Forum on Future Energy: Women, Business, and the Global Economy in August 2017. The conference also focused on the importance of teaching women new technologies as a form of social entrepreneurship.

==== Kenya ====
Kenya has also seen significant growth for women in business; encouraging entrepreneurship by women has been an important approach to poverty in Kenya. The Kenyan government, with support from NGOs, has created many programs providing access to financial resources, loans, and entrepreneurial education. Two examples are the Women's Enterprise Fund, enacted in 2007, and the creation of the Women's University of Science and Technology. The Women's Enterprise Fund allows women greater access to small loans and financial services, such as bank accounts. The Women's University of Science and Technology, which is the first all-women's university in Kenya, allows women to access higher education and entrepreneurial training. These programs have empowered women to create small to medium-size enterprises, such as tailoring and bead-making. Kenyan society has also seen some shift in women's roles from caretakers to business owners, as called for in Vision 2030 - the Kenyan government's initiative to empower women, to achieve greater gender equality, economic growth, and to alleviate poverty.

The barriers women face to becoming entrepreneurs are exemplified through the perspectives of existing female entrepreneurs in Kenya. Mary Okello, the executive director of a cluster of private schools called Makini schools, discussed the difficulty of accessing loans. She explained that a major issue in Kenya was that only 1% of land is owned solely by women which makes it difficult for them to offer a bank collateral. Another obstacle for women in business is the limited foundational support from the Kenyan government. This is expressed through the experience of Esther Passaris, managing director of Adopt A Light. She recalled that when her organization partnered with the Council, there was no clear and evident framework for the next progressive steps and she felt the government could have provided a more effective way of protecting her business.

==== Ghana ====
In Ghana, women such as Ayisha Fuseini have benefited from grants and sponsorships from NGOs and big business like Camfed and the MasterCard Foundation's Innovation Bursary Program (IBP), allowing them to become entrepreneurs.

==== Thailand ====
In Thailand the gender gap in education has reduced. In 2015, women were almost half of the 38.8 million in the labor force: 17.6 million or 45.8 percent were women. Gender equality is guaranteed by the Thai constitution. As a result, Thailand is one of the countries with the highest number of women in management positions. Thailand has 45% more women in CEO positions than the ASEAN countries and China, and 36% of senior managers are women, higher than the G7 countries (21%). Thailand is also one of the world's best-performing countries when it comes to women in senior business roles. The kingdom also has a high workforce participation rate for women: 60.1% in March 2019. Thailand consistently comes in the top five Asia-Pacific countries with the highest number of women in executive roles.

=== Developed countries ===
==== Denmark ====
A 2025 report by the Danish Chamber of Commerce based on numbers by Statistics Denmark showed that 27% of Danish entrepreneurs in 2020 were women.

==== United Kingdom ====
A surge in the number of women starting businesses in the United Kingdom has narrowed the "enterprise gap" between male and female company owners in the past decade. The proportion of working-age women going into business rose by 45% in the three-year period between 2013 and 2016, compared with 2003 to 2006, according to a report by Aston University in Birmingham. The share of working-age men going into business increased by 27% during the same period.

==== United States ====
The 1988 Women's Business Ownership Act has been credited with bringing more women into business ownership" in the United States. The number of female-owned businesses in the United States has grown at twice the rate of all firms. As of 2018, around 40% of US firms are majority-owned by women. Corporate support for women in business is also on the rise, with grants made available to help women in business.

== See also ==
- Diversity, equity, and inclusion programs
- Gender pay gap
- Gender representation on corporate boards of directors
- List of companies founded by women
