= Female entrepreneurs =

Women who organize and manage an enterprise

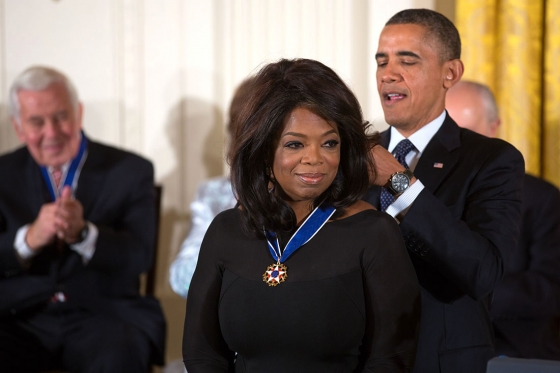
American entrepreneur, television host and media executive Oprah Winfrey receiving the Presidential Medal of Freedom from US President Barack Obama in 2013.

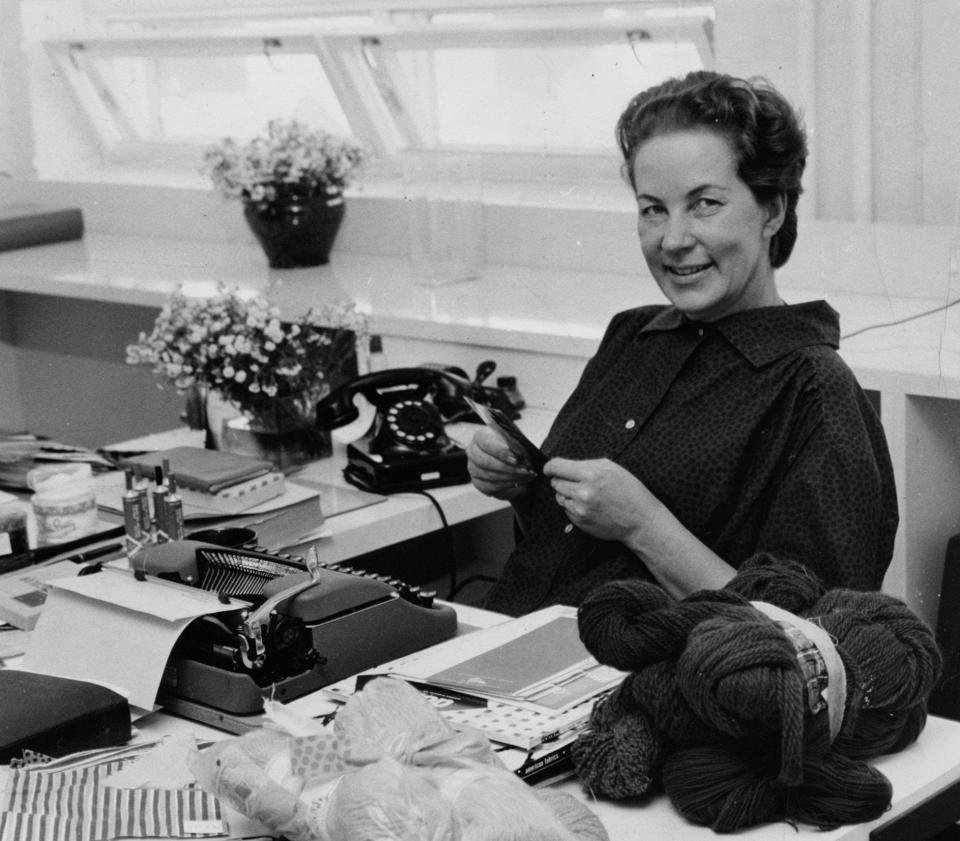
Finnish entrepreneur Armi Ratia (1912–1979), founder of the Marimekko textile and home decorating company.

Female entrepreneurs are women who organize, operate, and manage businesses, often overcoming gender-based social, financial, and cultural barriers. Female entrepreneurship has steadily increased in the United States during the 20th and 21st century, with number of female owned businesses increasing at a rate of 5% since 1997. This growth has led to the rise of wealthy self-made women such as Coco Chanel, Diane Hendricks, Meg Whitman, and Oprah Winfrey.

The history of female entrepreneurship stretches back centuries, from Eliza Lucas Pinckney's plantation management in colonial South Carolina to Rebecca Lukens's 19th-century ironworks, Madame C. J. Walker's early 20th-century beauty empire, and later pioneers such as Estée Lauder and Martha Stewart. Across time, women entrepreneurs have often faced skepticism, discriminatory property and inheritance laws, and limited access to capital and networks. Despite these barriers, women have launched ventures in industries ranging from textiles, retail, and home-based businesses to finance, technology, and manufacturing. Legislative milestones such as the Women's Business Ownership Act of 1988 in the U.S. and the rise of global support organizations have helped expand women's access to credit, markets, and government contracts.

Today, female entrepreneurship is a worldwide phenomenon, with women representing roughly one-third of all entrepreneurs globally. Patterns vary widely: participation is high in sub-Saharan Africa, where women make up over one-quarter of the entrepreneurial workforce, but significantly lower in parts of the Middle East and Asia. Women in low- and middle-income countries are more likely to pursue early-stage entrepreneurship, often out of necessity, while women in high-income countries are more likely to scale firms in professional and technical fields.

Despite steady progress, female entrepreneurs continue to face challenges including unequal access to financing, underrepresentation in STEM fields, gender stereotypes in investment decisions, and barriers to scaling firms. Programs such as microfinance initiatives, mentorship networks, and government-backed incentives aim to reduce these obstacles. Many women also pursue entrepreneurship to balance family responsibilities, achieve flexible work, or advance feminist values by creating enterprises "for women, by women." Collectively, female entrepreneurs play a crucial role in shaping economies and societies worldwide, while continuing to challenge traditional gender norms in business.

Women have become increasingly visible in creative industries such as design and lifestyle media, using digital platforms to expand entrepreneurial opportunities in interior design.

== History ==
=== Antiquity ===
The earliest known well-documented businesswoman is the Sumerian Ama-e, who was involved in various trades and real estate investments (circa 2330 BC).

Another example of a well-documented businesswoman is an Assyrian businesswoman of the city of Assur named Ahaha, who operated in the 1800s BC. She is known for pursuing the resolution to an issue of financial fraud committed against her.

Funeral monuments, inscriptions and other archeological remains demonstrate that women could be active within a number of different professions and in the business world: from builders to factory workers, from market salers of anyting from beans to nails to perfumer, business agent and medical doctor. The Ancient Roman city of Pompeii, which gives an unusually rich documentation of women's range of professions and business opportunities, gives a number of examples of individual Roman women with diverse professions. A number of businesswomen are noted among the citizens of Pompeii. Among them were Naevoleia Tyche, a former slave, businesswoman and investor, who became rich enough to build a magnificent grave monument; the real estate owner and landlord Julia Felix; the money lender Faustilla; the vine producer Caesia Helpis, whose vine were sold by the female vine merchant Vibia; the fish sauce seller Umbricia Fortunata; the perfumer Gavia Severa; and the very successful Eumachia, who was both the owner of a factory as well as a Priestess and the Benefactor of a professional Guild organization.

=== Medieval and early modern period ===
In Medieval Europe, the majority of business professions in the Medieval city were monopolised by guilds; associations of skilled workers who regulated trade and protected the economic interests of their members. The vast majority of guilds did not admit women as members. However, guilds customarily allowed the widows of guild members to continue their late husbands' businesses. Hence, almost all businesswomen in the Middle Ages were widows. Nevertheless, it was not uncommon to find successful businesswomen in the Medieval European cities who took over their husbands business and developed it further, such as Gertrud Morneweg, who took over the substantial banking business of her late spouse in the Hanseatic city of Lübeck in 1286, and Jeanne la Fouacière of France, who dominated the linen trade in Paris in the late 13th and early 14th centuries.

The guild system continued in Europe until the 19th century, as did the system of European businesswomen, mostly widows who inherited their late husbands' businesses. However, during the early modern period, the guild system was undermined by the emergence of new professions not included in it. Early modern Europe had many examples of rich and successful businesswomen. Gracia Mendes Nasi (1510 – 1569) was a Sephardi Jewish businesswoman who became one of the wealthiest and most influential women of Renaissance Europe, managing a business banking and trading empire, Casa Mendes-Benveniste, which operated throughout Europe and the Mediterranean. In the 18th century, the French fashion merchant Rose Bertin (1747-1813) became an internationally famous French fashion designer and is widely credited with having brought fashion and haute couture to the forefront of popular culture, being the fashion designer of Queen Marie Antoinette.

=== 19th and 20th centuries ===
In the 19th century, the guild system in Europe was abolished, ending the requirement that businesswomen be widows who had inherited their businesses from their late husbands, and enabling women to start businesses independently. The 19th century offers many examples of pioneering self-made businesswomen, such as the florist Madame Prévost of Paris and the perfumer Antoinette Nording of Sweden.

However, despite the abolition of the guild system, the 19th century was still a problematic time period for a woman to start a business. Married women were under legal guardianship, so in practice, the new freedom to start a business was primarily open to unmarried women and widows. In parallel, there were prejudices against women being active in business during the Victorian era, as the Victorian ideal for women was that of domesticity, and not a woman involved in public life and high business, where she would have to deal with men.

During the 20th century, women were technically legally given the same rights as men to participate in business. The century offers many examples of successful businesswomen who achieved high positions in business worldwide. However, informal hindrances such as prejudice and discrimination remained a factor.

== History by country ==
=== United States ===
==== Pre 1900 ====
The first female-owned business in the United States is recorded in 1739 when Eliza Lucas Pinckney took over her family's plantations in South Carolina when she was 16 years old. In the 18th and 19th centuries, women operated small businesses that they attained from inheritance or to supplement their income. In many cases, they were trying to avoid poverty or were replacing the income from the loss of a spouse. At that time, the ventures that these women undertook were not thought of as entrepreneurial. Many of them had to focus on their domestic responsibilities. For instance, with longstanding and significant barriers to educational and alternative employment opportunities, Black women were historically relegated to low-paying jobs and domestic work—particularly in the Jim Crow South. As a result, Black women of the early 20th century developed entrepreneurial niches in dressmaking, Black hair care, private home domestic work and midwifery. Lower levels of wealth, access to capital, racial discrimination and inadequate networks have been and continue to be barriers to entrepreneurship women of colour face.

The term entrepreneur describes individuals who have ideas for products and/or services that they turn into a viable business. Historically, this term was reserved for men.

Women became more involved in the business world only when the idea of women in business became palatable to the general public; however, this does not mean that there were no female entrepreneurs until that time. In the 17th century, Dutch colonists in New Netherland (now New York City) operated under a matriarchal society in which many women inherited money and land and, through this inheritance, became business owners. One of the most successful women of this time was Margaret Hardenbrook Philipse, who was a merchant, a shipowner, and was involved in the trading of goods.

During the mid-18th century, it was popular for women to own certain businesses like brothels, alehouses, taverns, and retail shops. Most of these businesses were not perceived as having good reputations because it was considered shameful for women to be in these positions. Society frowned upon women involved in such businesses because they detracted from the women's supposed gentle and frail nature. During the 18th and 19th centuries, more women came out from under the oppression of society's limits and began to emerge into the public eye. Despite societal disapproval, women such as Rebecca Lukens flourished. In 1825, Lukens took over the family business, Brandywine Iron Works & Nail Factory, and turned it into a profit-generating steel business.

==== 1900-1945 ====
In the 1900s, due to a more progressive way of thinking, and the rise of feminism, female entrepreneurs began to be a widely accepted term. Although these female entrepreneurs served mostly female consumers, they were making great strides. Women gained the right to vote in 1920, and two years later, sisters Clara and Lillian Westropp founded Women's Savings & Loan to teach women how to manage their money wisely. As society progressed, female entrepreneurs became more influential. With the boom of the textile industry and the development of the railroad and telegraph system, women such as Madame C. J. Walker took advantage of the changing times. Walker successfully marketed her hair care products and became the first African American female millionaire. Carrie Crawford Smith was the owner of an employment agency that opened in 1918, and, like Madame C. J. Walker, she sought to help women by providing them with opportunities to work.

During the Great Depression, some of the opportunities afforded to women took a backseat, and society seemed to reverse its views, reverting to more traditional roles. This affected women working in business; however, it also served as a push to those involved in the entrepreneurial world. More women began to start their own businesses, looking to survive during this time of hardship. In 1938, Hattie Moseley Austin, who had begun to sell chicken and biscuits after her husband died, opened Hattie's Chicken Shack in Saratoga Springs, New York.

During World War II, many women entered the workforce, filling jobs that men had left behind to serve in the military. Some women, of their own accord, took these jobs as a patriotic duty, while others started businesses of their own. One of these women was Pauline Trigère, who came to New York from Paris in 1937 and started a tailoring business that later became a high-end fashion house. Another woman was Estée Lauder, who was working on the idea for her beauty products which officially launched in 1946, a year after the war ended. When the war ended, many women still had to maintain their place in the business world because many of the men who returned were injured.

==== 1950-1980 ====
The National Federation of Business and Professional Women's Clubs was a source of encouragement to female entrepreneurs. They often held workshops with established entrepreneurs, such as Elizabeth Arden, who would give advice. During the 1950s, women found themselves surrounded by messages everywhere, stating what their role should be. Domesticity was the overall public concern and a theme that was highly stressed during this time, and women had to juggle combined home responsibilities and their careers.

Home-based businesses helped solve a significant part of the problem for women who worried about being mothers. Lillian Vernon, while pregnant with her first child, started her own business dealing with catalogues by investing money from wedding gifts and started filling orders right at her kitchen table. Mary Crowley founded Home Decorating and Interiors to help women work from home by throwing parties to sell products in the comfort of their own homes. In an effort to avoid criticism and lost business from those who did not support women in business, Bette Nesmith, who developed the product "Mistake Out", a liquid that painted over mistakes in typing, would sign her orders B. Smith so no one would know she was a woman.

From the 1960s to the late 1970s, another change came about when divorce rates rose, and many women were forced back into the role of being the sole provider. This pushed them back into the working world, where they were not well received. When the recession hit, many of these women were the first to be without work. Once again, the entrepreneurial endeavours of women came to the rescue as an effort of asserting themselves and aiding other women in being a part of the workforce. Mary Kay Ash and Ruth Fertel of Ruth's Chris Steak House were part of that movement.

==== 1980s onward ====
The 1980s and 1990s were a time of reaping the benefits from the hard work of women who worked tirelessly for their rightful place in the workforce as employees and entrepreneurs. Martha Stewart and Vera Bradley were among the twenty-first percent of women who owned businesses. The public was also becoming more receptive and encouraging to these female entrepreneurs, acknowledging the valuable contribution they were making to the economy. The National Association of Women Business Owners helped push Congress to pass the Women's Business Ownership Act in 1988, which would end discrimination in lending and strike down laws requiring married women to obtain their husbands' signatures for all loans. In addition, the Act also gave women-owned businesses a chance to compete for government contracts.

Another monumental moment for women in business was the appointment of Susan Engeleiter as head of the US government's Small Business Administration in 1989. In the late 1980s and throughout the 1990s, there was more of a focus on networking opportunities for female entrepreneurs. There were many opportunities that came about to help those who were interested in starting up their own businesses. Support groups, organizations for educating the female entrepreneur, and other opportunities like seminars and help with financing came from many different sources, such as the Women's Business Development Center and Count Me In. Despite all these advances, the female entrepreneurs still fell behind when compared to their male counterparts.

As the 1990s began, the availability of computers and the increasing popularity of the internet gave a much-needed boost to women in business. This technology allowed them to be more prevalent in the business world and showcase their skills to their competitors. Even with the increased popularity of women in business, the availability of technology and the support from different organizations, female entrepreneurs today are still struggling. The economic downturn of 2008 did not serve to help them in their quest. However, with the continual attention given to female entrepreneurs and the educational programs afforded to women who seek to start out with their own business ventures, there is much information and help available. Since 2000, there has been an increase in small and big ventures by women, including one of their biggest obstacles—financing. Vartika Manasvi is among those who chose Canada over the US. According to her, "there's no longevity there."

== Demographics ==
Studies have shown that successful female entrepreneurs start their businesses as a second or third profession. Because of their previous careers, female entrepreneurs enter the business world later on in life, around 40–60 years old. According to the Global Entrepreneurship Monitor report, "women are nearly one-third more likely to start businesses out of necessity than men." Because women are overtaking their male peers in the level of education obtained, having higher education degrees is one of the significant characteristics that many successful female entrepreneurs have in common. The average self-employment rate for women under 25 years old in OECD countries is 7.2%.

The number of self-employed women has steadily increased over the past three decades, putting them at an approximate thirty-three percent increase. Many female-owned businesses continue to be home-based operations. These types of businesses usually have limited revenue with about eighty per cent of them making less than $50,000 in 2002. This group made up about six per cent of total women-owned businesses. Children of these female entrepreneurs are expected to boost that number as they contribute to the growing number of female entrepreneurs. Most women-owned businesses are in wholesale, retail trade, and manufacturing. Female entrepreneurs have also made a name for themselves in professional, scientific, and technical services, as well as in healthcare and social assistance. In the majority of OECD countries, female entrepreneurs are more likely to work in the services industry than their male counterparts.

In 1972, women-owned businesses accounted for 4.6 percent of all U.S. businesses—that was about 1.5 million self-employed women. That number increased to 2.1 million in 1979 and 3.5 million in 1984. In 1997, there were about 5.4 million women-owned businesses and in 2007, that number increased to 7.8 million. The participation of women in entrepreneurial activities does of course vary in different levels around the world. For example, in Pakistan, female entrepreneurs account for only 1% of this gender's population, while in Zambia, 40% of women are engaged in this activity. The highest number of women involved in entrepreneurial activities can be seen in Sub-Saharan Africa, with 27% of the female population. Latin America/Caribbean economies show comparatively high percentages as well (15%). The lower numbers are seen in the MENA/Mid-Asia region with entrepreneurial activities registering at 4%. Developed Europe and Asia, as well as Israel, also show low rates of 5%.

== International implications ==
An international study found that women from low to middle income countries (such as Russia and the Philippines) are more likely to enter early-stage entrepreneurship when compared to those of higher-income countries (such as Belgium, Sweden, and Australia). A significant factor that may play a role in this disparity can be attributed to the fact that women from low-income countries often seek additional means of income to support themselves and their families. Overall, 40 to 50 percent of all small businesses are owned by women in developing countries. Alternatively, this may also be because in western business practices, it is not seen as beneficial to exhibit perceived feminine traits. While eastern businesses tend to follow methods based around mutual respect and understanding, western businesses' expectations are for business leaders to be more ruthless, headstrong, and less sensitive or respectful.

"In the grab for power, women use whatever means available to them, whereas a man would take a club to his opponents head, a woman is more likely use other less forceful and more subversive measures. Let's just own it, we have different weapons in our arsenal." Female entrepreneurs make up approximately 1/3 of all entrepreneurs globally. According to one study, in 2012, there was an approximate 126 million women who were either starting or already running new businesses in various economies all over the world. As for those who were already established, there were approximately 98 million. Not only are these women running or starting their own businesses but they are also employing others so that they are participating in the growth of their respective economies.

A study in India, entitled "Barriers of Women Entrepreneurs: A Study in Bangalore Urban District", has concluded that despite all these constraints, successful female entrepreneurs do exist. Female entrepreneurs have evidently more to 'acquire' than their male counterparts. But, the socio-cultural environment in which women are born and raised hinders them. Social customs, caste restrictions, cultural restraints, and norms leave women lagging behind men.

== Present challenges ==
A significant and underexamined challenge for female entrepreneurs is unequal access to mentorship and professional networks. Research from the University of Colorado Boulder found that white female and male entrepreneurs reach out to mentors at equal rates, but male mentors are disproportionately likely to accept outreach from male mentees. This is a bias that, while often unconscious, creates a persistent structural obstacle for women launching startups.

Even though female entrepreneurship and the formation of female-owned business networks is steadily rising, there are a number of challenges and obstacles that female entrepreneurs face. One major challenge for female entrepreneurs is the structural internalization of traditional gender roles by society. Entrepreneurship is still considered a male-dominated field, and it may be difficult to surpass these conventional views. Other than dealing with the dominant stereotype, female entrepreneurs face several obstacles related to their businesses.

=== Human, social, and financial capital barriers ===
One of the arguments in the study of gender discrimination in venture capital funding is that the demand for skilled women entrepreneurs is greater than the supply. In 1999, the Diana Project showed that contrary to conventional wisdom, many of the women who were not financed through growth capital had the necessary skills to build a high-growth business.

Other research has shown that women entrepreneurs are already launching ambitious businesses in the high-technology industry, expanding their social networks, and making their pitches more relatable to the male-dominated VC industry, despite many industry professionals believing that women are not doing that. Some studies, though, have looked at the social networks of women entrepreneurs, showing that their networks are different from those of their male counterparts and don't overlap as much with financial networks. An entrepreneur's social capital is defined by the networks they have access to, and receiving private equity funding is heavily influenced by an entrepreneur's social capital and whether it overlaps with that of venture capitalists. Thus, women continue being disadvantaged in that respect when looking for private equity funding.

Another important factor in receiving private equity funding is an entrepreneur's human capital, derived from education, training and experience. Some studies have shown that women were less likely to have the necessary experience in executive or technical management since they tended to be more present in the retail, finance, service and real estate sectors. This has led other researchers to study female entrepreneurs with extensive human capital, to identify whether they still face discrimination in their funding search. In a study that used data from MIT Venture Mentoring Service, it was found that women with strong human capital were still less likely to pursue their high-growth business ideas full-time. Education, especially in the STEM fields, is another barrier that women face in achieving the necessary human capital.

==== Obstacles in STEM ====
STEM-related fields are heavily male-dominated, with women extremely underrepresented. A 2010 study by the American Association of University Women suggests that underrepresentation stems from societal norms that create barriers. Some of these barriers include stereotypes and gender bias. But one of the most important aspects that is often not recognized as much is that some of these barriers come from the way that engineering and mathematics programs at universities are geared more towards men. An example outlined in this study was that a woman going into a math exam naturally feels more pressure because of the idea that men are better at math, and the environment of being in a room with more men would also subconsciously affect performance. In addition, overcoming the mindset that intelligence is fixed is imperative for women to achieve more in the scientific world. There are hundreds of peer-reviewed research papers written focusing on many different aspects of education, specifically regarding STEM, that explain the implicit bias against women. For example, a review, "Males under-estimate academic performance of their female peers in undergraduate biology classrooms", stated that men rank their fellow male classmates as more knowledgeable than their female peers.

There are also issues regarding occupational sex segregation because there is hiring discrimination in the technology and mathematics fields. This is partially due to the way society makes it seem as though it is socially abnormal for women to work in STEM-related fields. In addition, this issue is extremely hard to fix because it is so ingrained in society, but it is important that there are options for girls to get involved in STEM related classes and extracurriculars at a young age in order to create less of an inequality of opportunity. This will also help break the norm that STEM is a man's field.

=== Gendered processes in finding financing ===
A different approach to researching gender discrimination in venture capital funding is to study the gendered processes involved in financing.

It has been shown that in the venture capital world there is a strong tendency towards homophily, meaning that people with a certain background will associate themselves to individuals with a similar background. This leads to entrepreneurs seeking financing from members of their sex. Their results confirm this hypothesis since only 8.9% of proposals brought to VCs were put forward by women, even though the authors couldn't find a statistically significant difference between the probability for women and men to receive equity. This poses a huge challenge for women entrepreneurs seeking financing from other women, since the number of women venture capitalists has decreased from 10% in 1999 to 6% in 2014, which is why the Diana Project argues that for increasing women-led ventures' access to capital there should be more women VCs.

At the same time, these statistics could also be explained by the higher requirements that women face when submitting a proposal for VC financing. In one study, it was found that financing evaluators see women without a technical background as less capable than men without a technical background. Women with a technical background had an advantage to their male counterparts for being evaluated as more sociable and having better leadership skills. This also meant that for women to be seen as legitimate entrepreneurs, they needed to exhibit higher qualifications than male entrepreneurs, needing both a technical background and a higher social capital, thus strong social ties with people from the industry. This shows that for evaluators to trust women entrepreneurs' abilities, they need to see a greater potential in them than in their male counterparts, likely due to gender stereotypes.

Other studies, though, have shown that these are not the only obstacles women face due to the stereotypes associated with their gender. Multiple studies on discrimination faced by women seeking financing for their ventures have been built on top of the gender role congruity theory, which states that individuals expect men and women to act in ways that match their gender stereotypes. In one study, it was observed that qualities associated with successful entrepreneurs converged to attributes that evaluators assigned to male entrepreneurs, while the characteristics opposite to those of an ideal entrepreneur were generally attributed by evaluators to femininity. This highlights the fact that gender stereotyping is consistently being used in venture capitalists' decision-making process. Gender stereotyping in the VCs' decision making was also emphasised in a different study that showed that men and women get asked different questions during their pitches. The questions targeted towards the women entrepreneurs are focused on prevention and loss, while their male counterparts receive questions focused on potential gains. While women got asked questions like: "How predictable are your future cash flows?", men were asked: "What major milestones are you targeting for this year?" The authors note that this approach sets up women for failure from the very beginning.

Entrepreneurs are not the only ones affected by gender stereotypes. The whole process of seeking financing, from the relationships between entrepreneurs and investors to the human and social capital, have been shown to have gender embedded in them. It has been shown that women tend to emphasise the human and social capital they have, in an effort to compensate for the lack of resources usually associated with the ideal entrepreneur, especially since other studies have shown that the ideal entrepreneur usually has attributes generally associated to male entrepreneurs.^{[3]} In an effort to emphasise their potential, women also tend to stress the involvement of men as board members and board chairs in their ventures. The authors have classified women entrepreneurs' strategies that emphasise more "masculine" attributes of their venture, such as growth ambitions, as compensatory signalling strategies. Another aspect highlighted by this study is that industry experience in "feminine" industries, such as the spa and fitness industry, is seen as less valuable by investors than experience in industries generally associated to masculinity, such as the petrol industry.

Venture capitalists' gendered view of entrepreneurs' experience is only one example of how women entrepreneurs are held to different standards than their male counterparts. In a study focusing on the financing received by entrepreneurs from banks, it was found that male entrepreneurs received more funding than their female counterparts, despite having the same number of employees and past performance track record (two factors that show viability for a business). Thus, women's strong track records did not correlate as strongly with the funding received as for men, and so for the same business attributes their reward was lower.

=== Obstacles specific to starting new firms ===
Homophily is a sociological concept describing the tendency for people to seek out or be attracted to those who are similar to them. This theory impacts the number of women who are able to start new firms because there are fewer women than men who own their own companies; women compose about half of the labour force but own only 36 percent of US companies. This statistic shows how it is evident that the number of women in this field is disproportionate to the population. Recent data suggests that when female entrepreneurs start their businesses, they have significantly lower levels of capital than men. A disproportionate access to capital, compared to male entrepreneurs, also serves a systemic barrier to creating a new firm. Women who start their own firms have a higher likelihood of success if they have disposable financial or social capital. Without this opportunity, there are many more obstacles that place women at a disadvantage compared to their male counterparts. Women entrepreneurs are starting with a disadvantage when starting their firms, making it more difficult to navigate the initial stages of growing a personal business. Other obstacles include the fact that firms owned by women tend to be smaller than men, are more likely to fail, and have lower levels of sale, profits and employment. Knowing that these barriers exist may serve as a deterrent to female entrepreneurs, or alternatively increase the chance of less successful firms. Structural elements include sex discrimination and internalized stereotypes that create these barriers. Furthermore, firms owned by women are predominantly part of the service and retail sector. Consolidation of female-run firms in a specific sector highlights internalized stereotypes regarding abilities and interests of female entrepreneurs.

=== External finance and sex discrimination. ===
In general, women have lower personal financial assets than men. This means that for a given opportunity and equally capable individual, women must secure additional resources compared to men in order to exploit the opportunity, because they control less capital. The question of whether women have a harder time securing financing than men for the same business opportunity has become its own subfield. One possible issue in raising outside capital is that 96% of senior venture capitalists are men and may not be as understanding of female-centric businesses. However, the situation seems to be improving. A study by Babson College showed that in 1999, fewer than 5% of venture capital investments went to companies with a woman on the executive team. In 2011, it was 9%, and in 2013 it had jumped to 18%.

One solution to women's difficulties in obtaining financing has been microfinancing. Microfinance institutions have become especially popular in developing economies. Female entrepreneurs have also been especially successful in getting funded through crowdfunding platforms like Kickstarter.

Due to a lack of funding for women in new businesses, many women founders have had to hire or create fake male profiles to act as co-founders, executives, or the face of their businesses to make progress.

=== Obstacles to managing a small firm ===
Studies on female entrepreneurs show that women have to cope with stereotypical attitudes towards them on a daily basis. Business relations from customers to suppliers and banks constantly remind the entrepreneur that she is different, sometimes in a positive way such as by praising her for being a successful entrepreneur even though she is a woman. Employees tend to mix the perceptions of the manager with their images of female role models, leading to mixed expectations on a female manager to be a manager as well as a "mother". The workload associated with being a small business manager is also not easily combined with caring for children and a family. However, even if the revenues are somewhat lower, female entrepreneurs feel more in control and happier with their situation than they would if they worked as employees.

Female entrepreneurship has been recognized as an important source of economic growth. Female entrepreneurs create new jobs for themselves and others and also provide society with different solutions to management, organisation, and business problems. However, they still represent a minority of all entrepreneurs. Female entrepreneurs often face gender-based barriers to starting and growing their businesses, like discriminatory property; matrimonial and inheritance laws, and/or cultural practices; lack of access to formal finance mechanisms; limited mobility and access to information and networks, etc.

A woman's entrepreneurship can make a particularly strong contribution to the economic well-being of the family and communities, poverty reduction and women's empowerment, thus contributing to the Millennium Development Goals (MDGs). Thus, governments across the world, as well as various developmental organizations, are actively undertaking the promotion of female entrepreneurs through various schemes, incentives and promotional measures. Female entrepreneurs in the four southern states and Maharashtra account for over 50% of all women-led small-scale industrial units in India.

=== Obstacles to growing firms ===
A specific problem of female entrepreneurs seems to be their inability to achieve growth, especially sales growth.

Another issue is finance and, as stated previously, the entrepreneurial process is somewhat dependent on initial conditions. In other words, as women often have a difficult time assembling external resources, they start as less ambitious firms that can be financed to a greater degree by their own available resources. This also has consequences for the future growth of the firm. Basically, firms with more resources at start-up have a higher probability to grow than firms with fewer resources. Resources include the following: societal position, human resources, and financial resources. This initial endowment in the firm is of great importance for firm survival and especially for firm growth.

A study by the Kauffman Foundation of 570 high-tech firms started in 2004 showed that women-owned firms were more likely to be organized as sole proprietorships, both during their startup year and in the years to follow. Female entrepreneurs were also much more likely to start their firms out of their homes and were less likely to have employees. This fact may indicate that women either anticipated starting smaller firms or were operating under resource constraints that prevented them from launching larger firms that required more assets, employees, or financial resources. This study also found that women only raised 70% of the amount that men raised to start their firms, which ultimately impacted their ability to introduce new products and services or expand their business in terms of employees or geographic locations.

Despite many female entrepreneurs facing growth barriers, they can still achieve substantial firm growth. Organizations such as Gritty in Pink - a platform associated with Melissa Etheridge that empowers women in music - have succeeded through partnerships with programs like the Long Beach Accelerator, which works with Sunstone Management to invest in tech startups and emphasizes diversity.

== Innovative initiatives to help women finance their start-ups ==
France Active has set up the ÉGALITÉ Femmes guarantee to help women involved in setting up, taking over or developing businesses gain easier access to bank credit. This guarantee covers up to 80% of a bank loan, limited to €50,000, to finance investments and working capital requirements over a maximum period of seven years.

At the same time, the Initiative France honor loan offers financial support to female entrepreneurs without requiring a personal guarantee or interest. This simplifies access to larger loans, generally between €3,000 and €50,000, with a national average of €9,700.

Réseau Entreprendre's Wom'energy program, focused on female entrepreneurship, offers an honorary loan from €15,000 to €50,000 to support women entrepreneurs at all stages of their development. Similarly, regional action plans for women's entrepreneurship have been multiplying since the 2012 framework agreement, involving central departments and associations in the assessment and implementation of tools tailored to each geographical area.

More than twenty regions have already implemented concrete action plans in sectors such as industry, construction, digital technology and innovation. In addition, a number of competitions such as the Be a Boss awards, the Business O Féminin Awards, and those organized by the regions (Toutes pour elles, Créatrices d'avenir, etc.) have been launched.

== Encouragement ==
In 1993, "Take Our Daughters To Work Day" was popularized to support career exploration for girls, and later expanded to Take Our Daughters and Sons to Work Day. Hillary Clinton stated that "Investing in women is not only the right thing to do but also the smart thing to do." Research shows that there are many support groups for women in business, for female entrepreneurs, and for women looking for business advice. Women in different areas are willing to show the support that in some cases, they never had. They offer encouragement, advice, and support to moms who seek to provide for their families through their own visions for the business. HerCorner, is a group located in Washington, D.C. This group seeks to bring women business owners together to collaborate with each other for the betterment of their businesses. There are government-backed programs available to female entrepreneurs and information can be found on their website at SBA Online and their Facebook group SBAgov. Female-only taxi companies in India, the UAE, and Brazil support working women. One example of successful female entrepreneurship in rural villages of Bangladesh is the Infolady Social Entrepreneurship Programme (ISEP). Norway celebrates Female Entrepreneur of the Year.

== Reasons for launching firms ==
Many studies show that women start their own businesses for a variety of reasons. These reasons include the following: having an idea for a business plan, having a passion for solving a specifically related career problem, wanting to be more in control of their careers, maintaining a more balanced life, having a flexible work schedule, and taking a personal vision and turning it into a lucrative business.

Gender roles are still very much a part of their lives, but some female entrepreneurs feel more in control when working for themselves.

== Feminism ==
A feminist entrepreneur is an individual who applies feminist values and approaches through entrepreneurship, with the goal of improving the quality of life and wellbeing of girls and women. Many are doing so by creating 'for women, by women' enterprises. Feminist entrepreneurs are motivated to enter commercial markets by desire to create wealth and social change, based on the ethics of cooperation, equality, and mutual respect.

== See also ==
- Joan Dant
