= Fajer Rabia Pasha =

Pakistani academic administrators

Fajer Rabia Pasha (born 1984) is the executive director of Pakistan Alliance for Girls Education She is a social entrepreneur, activist, global leader, and influencer fighting for education rights for girls in Pakistan.

== Early life ==
Pasha was born in Pakistan in 1984. From the age of 15 she engaged in her mother's charity in Pakistan and helped women entrepreneurs from rural areas connect with global market. She developed a network of support to help these women to showcase their products. She then moved to the United Kingdom with her family in 2000. She registered Inspired Sisters, a social enterprise, at age of 18 in 2003 in Manchester when she identified the need to provide women-only facilities for women from ethnic minority backgrounds.

== Career ==
Fajer set up and lead various initiatives to help women and marginalized communities out of poverty. Fajer actively served on various charity boards in England and remained engaged at policy level work representing the Civil Society and BAME. After Fajer moved back to Pakistan in 2013, she joined Pakistan Alliance for Girls Education as the Executive Director.

== Recognition ==
Fajer's commitment to bring social change through education. Her work for entrepreneurship and social justice has been recognised at many forums including the 2019 Coat of Arms for services to communities in UK & Pakistan. For her Inspired Sisters initiative, she received the award as young Inspiring Women by Lord Mayor of Manchester 2019 Leadership Fellow – Society of Leaders, St George’s House Windsor Castle 2018. She also received the 2012 APPS UK Charity Award 2011.
