= Sophie Wade =

American businessperson and author

A. Sophie Wade
- Citizenship: British, American
- Education: B.A. (Oriental Studies), M.B.A. Oxford University, INSEAD
- Occupations: Businessperson, author
- Organization: Flexcel Network
- Website: www.sophiewade.com

Sophie Wade is a businessperson, founder and Work/force Transformation Advisor of Future-of-Work consultancy, Flexcel Network. She is the author of two books Embracing Progress: Next steps for the Future of work and Empathy Works: The Key to Competitive Advantage in the New Era of Work, a keynote speaker on current Future-of-Work issues and a LinkedIn Learning instructor with five courses available in eight languages which over 675,000 people have taken. Her courses space Future-of-Work skills, working with Gen Z, and empathy. She served on the Presidents' Assembly Steering Committee of the National Association of Women Business Owners (NAWBO) after serving as the President of the New York City chapter of NAWBO 2015-17.

== Early life and career ==
Wade was born and grew up in London, England. Wade has a B.A. degree from Oxford University in Oriental Studies (Chinese) and an MBA degree from INSEAD business school in France. She lived and worked in London, Hong Kong, France, Germany, Europe and the United States. In her career, she has worked at or consulted with large corporations as well as startups in strategy and finance roles assisting entrepreneurs and major corporations to build teams and ventures and create partnerships. In 2011, she founded Flexcel Network initially to advocate for and expand the implementation of workplace flexibility. She is an advisor, writer and speaker on business transformation and redesign of work, the increasingly blended human and digital workforce in the era of AI, dynamic Future-of-Work changes, the balance of talent and technology, non-linear and portfolio careers, as well as emphasising the importance of addressing AI's impact on early careers.

== Books ==
- Wade, A. Sophie (2017). Embracing Progress: Next Steps for the Future of Work. Advantage Media Group. ISBN 9781599327853.
- Wade, A. Sophie (2022). Empathy Works: The Key to Competitive Advantage in the New Era of Work. Page Two.

In her first book, she described approaches for workforce development. Approaches described by her include adapting new technologies, engagement through culture and mindset, good leadership, transparency, and empathy, coaching for productivity, performance and creativity, focusing on values, cultural impact and environmental issues, treating freelancers and contractors as employees.

== Personal life ==
Wade currently lives between Lisbon, Portugal and London, England. She is divorced with two children.
