= Askatu Bakery =

Bakery in Seattle, Washington, U.S.

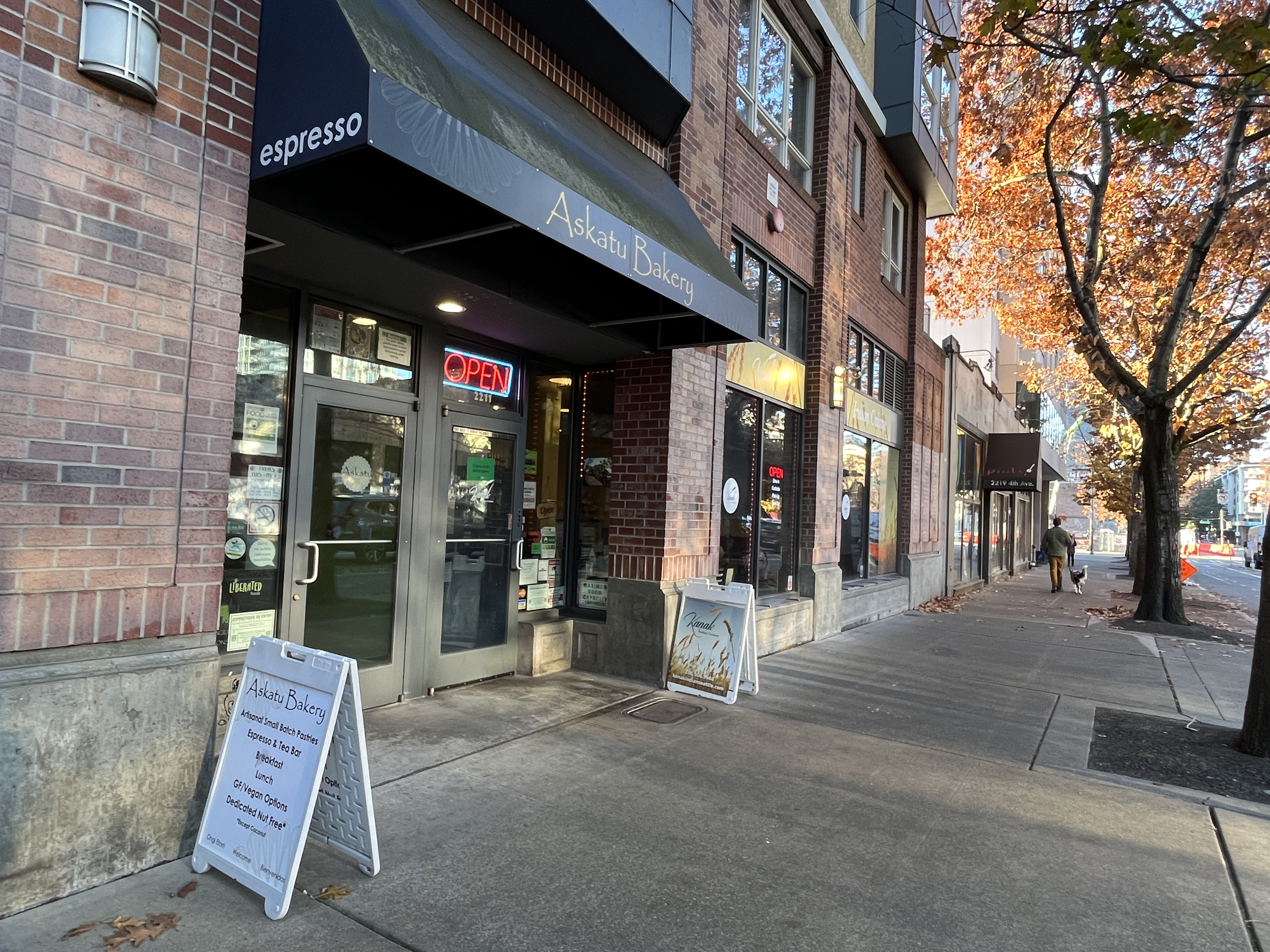
- The bakery's exterior in 2022
- Interactive map of Askatu Bakery

Restaurant information
- Location: 2209 4th Avenue, Seattle, King, Washington, 98121, United States
- Coordinates: 47.6147°N 122.3433°W

Askatu Bakery (sometimes Askatu Bakery and Cafe) is a Latino- and woman-owned bakery in Seattle's Belltown neighborhood, in the U.S. state of Washington. As an "allergen-free" bakery, Askatu offers gluten-free and vegan options, and avoids eggs, nuts, and wheat. Established by Estela Martinez in 2019.

== Description ==
The Latino- and woman-owned bakery is located in downtown Seattle's Belltown neighborhood. Noms magazine says the cafe offers a "unique blend of Basque and American" pastries, as well as coffee and tea. Askatu is known for its gluten-free options and avoids use of xanthan or guar gums. KNKX has described the business as an "allergen-free" bakery which avoids eggs, nuts, and wheat. Seattle's Child magazine has said Askatu is "free of the top nine allergens".

Askatu is associated with Liberated Foods by the same owner. In 2021, Lindsey Kirschman of the Seattle Post-Intelligencer said the bakery "doles out goods alongside Liberated Foods, LLC, a minority- and woman-owned small business that specializes in making allergen-free baked goods and mixes to order.

== History ==
Askatu is owned by head baker Estela Marie Degr Martinez, who initially operated the business at farmers' markets in 2015, and later opened a brick and mortar bakery in October 2019. She focused on allergen-free foods because of her family members with food allergies. Martinez also owns the affiliated company Liberated Foods, which she started following some encouragement from her daughter's classmate's mother. Liberated Foods also specializes in allergen-friendly baked goods and breads.

Askatu has been a vendor at the farmers' market in the University District. According to the Seattle Metropolitan, Askatu is "EnviroStars-certified, a City of Seattle program that recognizes green businesses and provides free sustainability tools and resources". The bakery is part of the Intentionalist network, which seeks to increase awareness of minority-owned small businesses in the region.

Askatu has participated in Seattle Restaurant Week. In 2023, the business participated in the Downtown Renton Chocolate Crawl.

== Reception ==
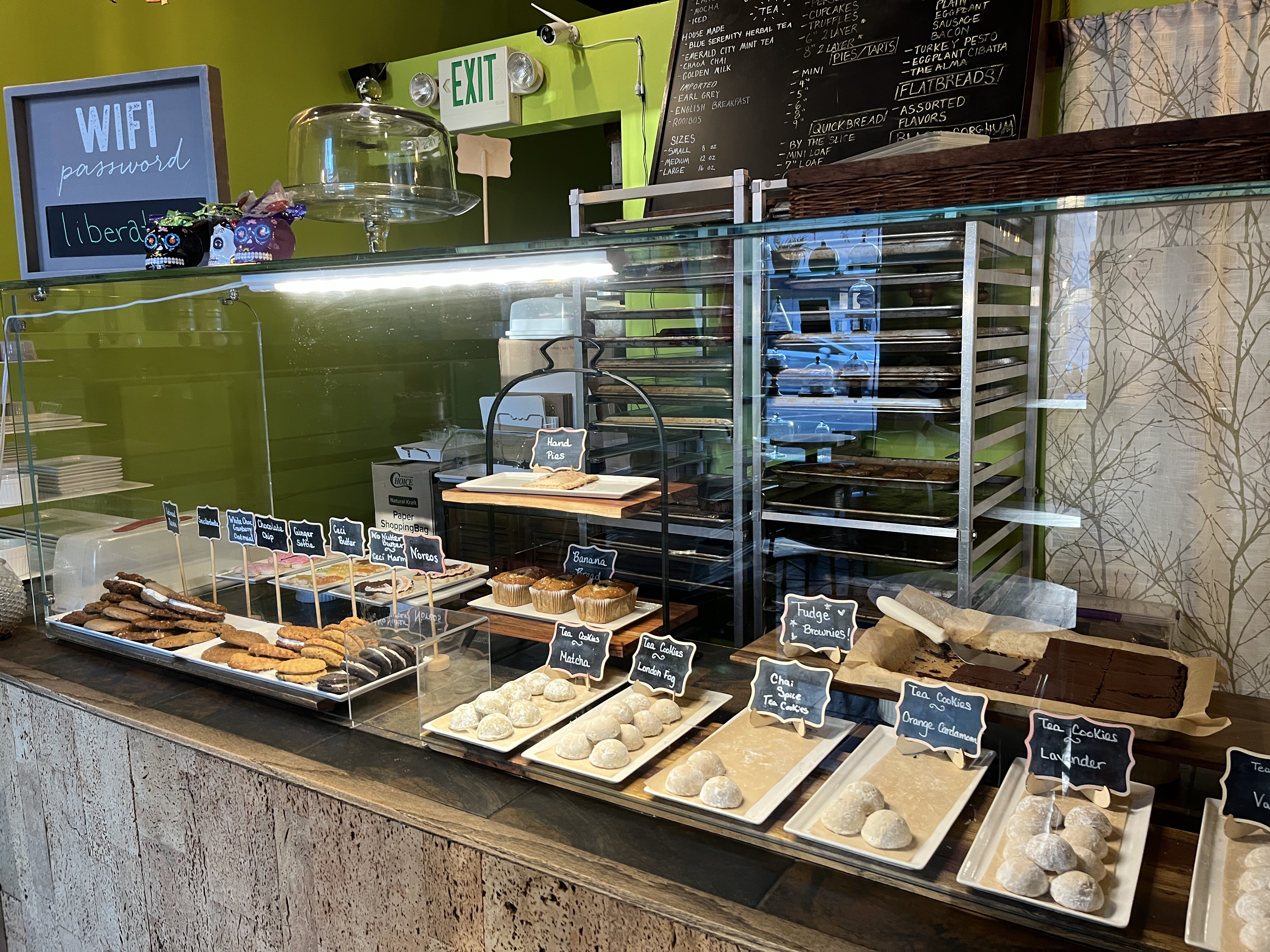
Interior, 2022

Lindsey Kirschman included the bakery in the Seattle Post-Intelligencer's 2021 list of the 14 best confectioneries in Seattle for holiday sweets and treats. In 2022, Sabra Boyd of Eater Seattle wrote, "Askatu's gluten-free baguettes boast a crunchy Maillard crust and beautiful crumb when sliced; a precise mix of proteins create the texture that every nostalgic celiac or gluten-intolerant person longs for. (This might sound like over-the-top praise, but for many, life without bread can feel limiting.)" Boyd, Dylan Joffe, and Maggy Lehmicke included the bakery in a 2022 overview of "where to eat fantastic gluten-free food in Seattle", and Harry Cheadle included Askatu in Eater Seattle's 2023 list of 18 of the city's "most perfect" bakeries. Noms magazine included Askatu in a 2023 list of Seattle's twelve best bakeries.

== See also ==
- List of bakeries
