= Caesia gens =

Ancient Roman family

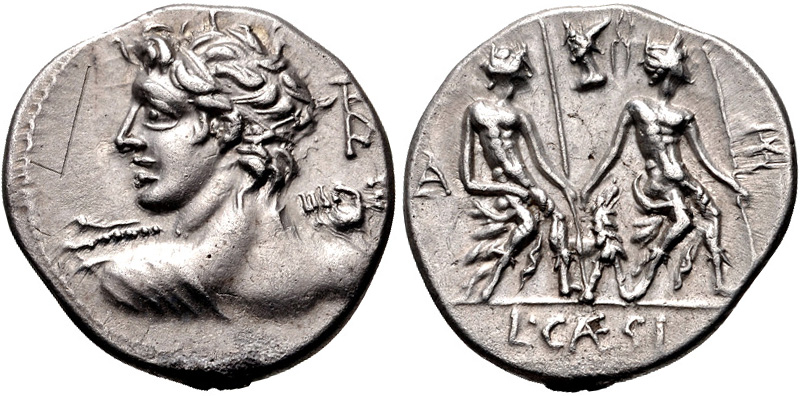
Denarius of Lucius Caesius, 112-111 BC. On the obverse is Apollo, as written on the monogram behind his head, who also wears the attributes of Vejovis. The obverse depicts a group of statues representing the Lares Praestites, which was described by Ovid.

The gens Caesia was a minor plebeian family at ancient Rome during the late Republic, and through to imperial times. The first member of this gens to achieve prominence was Marcus Caesius, praetor in 75 BC. Under the Empire, the Caesii were distinguished for their literary achievements.

== Origin ==
The nomen of the Caesii may be derived from the Latin adjective caesius, meaning a light blue or blue-grey colour, typically used to refer to the colour of a person's eyes. The same root may have given rise to the praenomen Caeso, and perhaps also to the cognomen Caesar.

== Praenomina ==
The earlier Caesii appearing in history used the praenomina Lucius and Marcus, two of the most common names throughout Roman history, to which the later Caesii added Publius, Titus, and Sextus.

== Branches and cognomina ==
The Caesii under the Republic are not known to have used any regular cognomina. In imperial times, the surnames Cordus, Bassus, Nasica, and Taurinus appear. The first three are typical Latin cognomina. Cordus originally signified that a person was born late in the year, while Bassus indicated someone given to stoutness, and Nasica referred to someone with a prominent nose. Taurinus belongs to a common type of cognomen derived from place-names, suggesting its bearer was a native of Taurinum, in northern Italy.

== Members ==
- Lucius Caesius, triumvir monetalis in 112 or 111 BC. His coins feature the Lares Praestites, the guardian spirits of Rome.
- Marcus Caesius, praetor in 75 BC.
- Marcus Caesius, a rapacious farmer of the tithes in Sicilia during the administration of Verres, in and after 73 BC.
- Lucius Caesius, a friend of Cicero, who accompanied him during his administration as proconsul in Cilicia in 50 BC.
- Marcus Caesius, an intimate friend of Cicero, who held the office of aedile at Arpinum, the only municipium which had such a magistracy, in 47 BC.
- Publius Caesius, an eques of Ravenna, enrolled as a Roman citizen by Gnaeus Pompeius Strabo.
- Sextus Caesius, an eques, mentioned by Cicero as a man of great honesty and integrity.
- Titus Caesius, a jurist, and pupil of Servius Sulpicius Rufus.
- Caesius Cordus, governor of Crete during the reign of Tiberius, accused of extortion and condemned.
- Caesius Nasica, commander of a legion in Britain under Aulus Didius Gallus.
- Lucius Caesius Martialis, consul suffectus from July to December in AD 57.
- Caesia Helpis, a wine producer and merchant at Pompeii.
- Caesius Bassus, a lyric poet of the first century, who perished in the eruption of Vesuvius in AD 79.
- Caesius Bassus, a grammarian of uncertain date, author of the tract Ars Caesii Bassi de Metris.
- Titus Caesius Taurinus, a poet, who probably lived in the fourth century, was the author of the poem, Votum Fortunae.

== See also ==
- List of Roman gentes

== Bibliography ==
- Marcus Tullius Cicero, Epistulae ad Atticum, Epistulae ad Familiares, Epistulae ad Quintum Fratem, In Verrem, Pro Balbo, Pro Flacco.
- Publius Cornelius Tacitus, Annales.
- Publius Ovidius Naso (Ovid), Fasti.
- Elias Putschius, Grammaticae Latinae Auctores Antiqui, Hanover (1605).
- Pieter Burmann, Anthologia Latina (Latin Anthology), ed. Wernsdorf, (1759–1778).
- Johann Christian Wernsdorf, Poëtae Latini Minores (Minor Latin Poets), Altenburg, Helmstedt (1780–1799).
- Dictionary of Greek and Roman Biography and Mythology, William Smith, ed., Little, Brown and Company, Boston (1849).
- George Davis Chase, "The Origin of Roman Praenomina", in Harvard Studies in Classical Philology, vol. VIII, pp. 103–184 (1897).
- D.P. Simpson, Cassell's Latin and English Dictionary, Macmillan Publishing Company, New York (1963).
- Michael Crawford, Roman Republican Coinage, Cambridge University Press (1974, 2001).
- Piotr Berdowski, "Roman Businesswomen: I: The Case of the Producers and Distributors of Garum in Pompeii", in Analecta Archaeologica Ressoviensia vol. III (2008), pp. 251–271.
- B. Longfellow, The Lives and Deaths of Women in Ancient Pompeii, University of Texas Press (2025).
