= Sage Lavine =

American author (born 1976)

- Occupation(s): Coach, author
- Organization: Women Rocking Business
- Website: https://womenrockingbusiness.com/

Sage Lavine (born 21 February 1976) is an American coach, author, and mentor, as well as the founder and CEO of Women Rocking Business.

== Career ==
Lavine is a leadership coach and advocate for women's rights and issues. In 2012, she founded Women Rocking Business, a coaching organisation to help women entrepreneurs grow successful businesses. She published Women Rocking Business in 2017 and launched the Women Rocking Business podcast in 2020. In 2019, she presented at TEDxWartburgCollege.
