= Disability in Kenya =

Disability in Kenya "results from the interaction between individuals with a health condition with personal and environmental factors including negative attitudes, inaccessible transport and public buildings, and limited social support. A person's environment has a huge effect on the experience and extent of disability." Having a disability can limit a citizen's access to basic resources, basic human rights, and social, political and economic participation in Kenyan society. There are three forms of limitation of access linked to disability: impairment, disability, and handicap. An impairment is "the loss or abnormality of psychological, physiological or anatomical structure or function." A disability results from an impairment as "the restriction or lack of ability to perform an activity in the manner considered normal for a human being", and the requirement for accommodation. Finally, a handicap "results from a disability, and limits or prevents the fulfilment of a role that is normal (depending on age, sex, and social and cultural factors) for that individual."

== Statistics ==
The World Health Organization (WHO) World Report on Disability of 2011 reports that people in low- and middle-income African countries like Kenya are more likely to report having disabilities than any other high-, middle- and low-income countries in the world. According to the State of Kenyan Population 2020 Report, 918,270 people aged 5 years and older live with a disability. This counts as 1.95% of the Kenyan population.

However, a key issue in Kenya truly is the lack of statistical data collection. There is a lack of research on how many citizens are affected by these and a lack of research on the different types of disabilities in Kenyan population. Today, there is an underqualification and underrepresentation in policy of mild disabilities. This makes it hard for the Kenyan government to implement efficient and targeted policies for its different citizens with disabilities. For instance, while 77.9% of Kenyans with physical disabilities require medical aid or assistance, only 58.2% have ever received it.

In addition, as Kenya is a lower-middle income economy, the Kenyan government has less budget to allocate to people with disabilities.

== Causes ==
=== Poverty ===
There is great mutual correlation and causation between disabilities and poverty in Kenya. Adults aged 18 to 34 with disabilities have a 15-percentage point higher probability of being multidimensionally poor than adults without disabilities.

Because 40% of Kenyans are multidimensionally poor, and 20% are living in extreme poverty today, Kenyans are more likely to have a disability. Mental and physical disabilities can be caused or worsened by the proxies of poverty. These include poor access to healthcare facilities, malnutrition, and consumption of contaminated water. Unsafe work conditions and work incidents can also lead to temporary or permanent disabilities.

=== Leading causes ===
Some leading causes of disability in Kenya include HIV/AIDS contamination. Because Kenya is a middle- to low-income country, people are less likely to receive proper treatment to prevent the transmission of the disease and to prevent its development. The HIV/AIDS disease can lead to physical, sensory, and cognitive impairments.

Another main cause of disabilities is conditions arising during the perinatal period. HIV/AIDS can be transmitted from a mother to her child during her pregnancy, causing birth defects. This can also include the pregnant mother's breathing in of polluted air coming from industrial or agricultural centres. This can affect the child's future development and increase the risks of prematurity.

Other less common causes include malaria and lower respiratory infections. These can both lead to long-term illnesses.

== Institutional protection ==
=== National policies ===
The disability body of the Kenyan government is the National Council for Persons with Disabilities (NCPWD). It operates the National Development Fund for Persons with Disabilities. This is the main national source of budget allocated towards assisting and empowering Persons with Disabilities (PWDs).

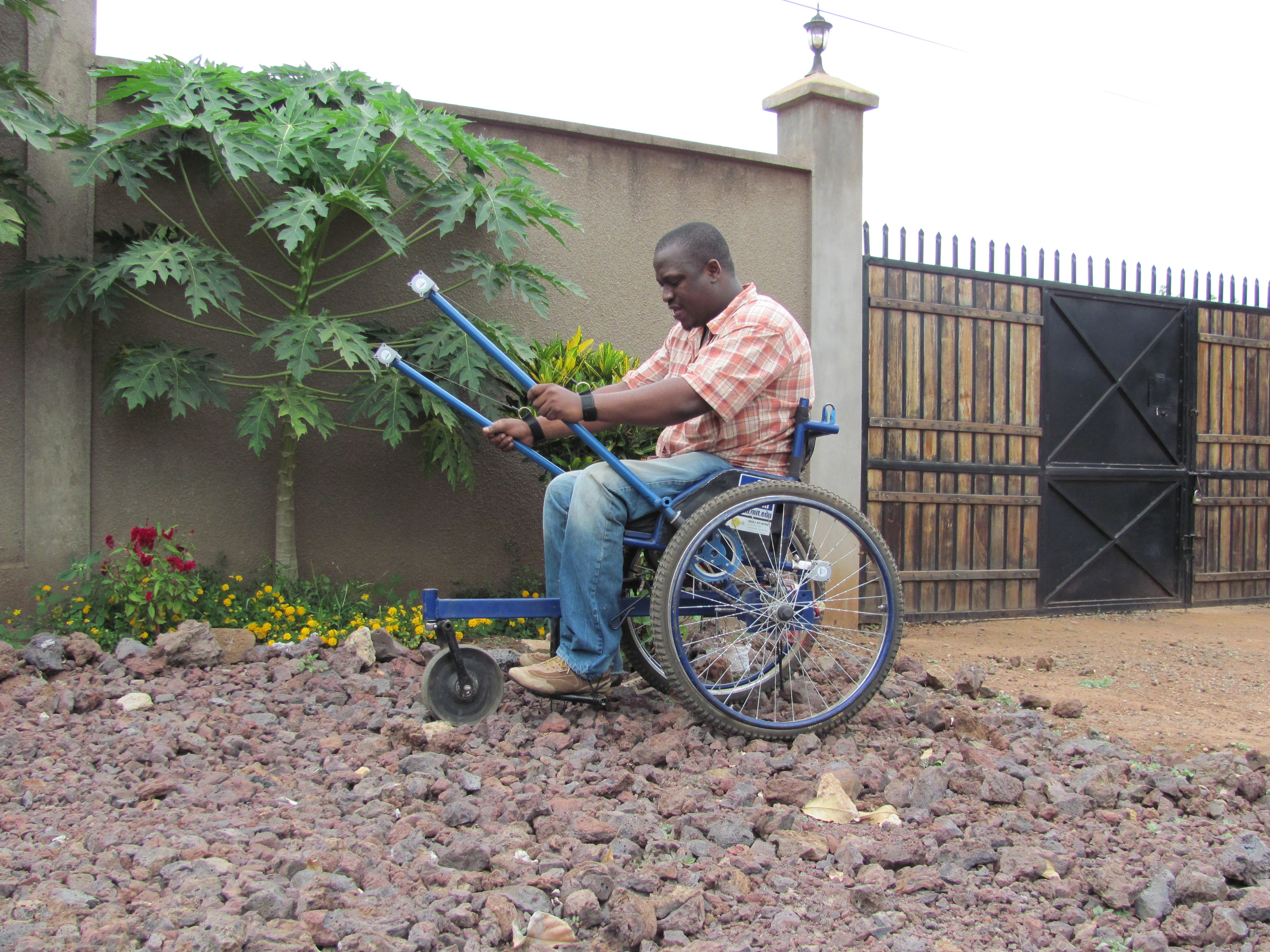
Leveraged wheelchair Kenya

The budget goes out to the following categories:

1. Assistive devices and services, such as wheelchairs and crutches
2. Educational assistance, such as scholarships
3. Economic empowerment and Revolving Fund, which consist in investing help to business projects created by and only by PWDs
4. Infrastructure and equipment, such as personal assistance or therapy
5. Cash transfers for households of people with severe disabilities living in extreme poverty

The last category is notable, because for households to apply for this form of government assistance, they have to be in extreme poverty and the PWD or PWDs in the household need to have a severe case of disability. In addition, this cash transfer program cannot be cumulated with other cash transfer programs.

The funding divided in these 5 categories are allocated directly to persons with disabilities, public and private institutions, flagship projects, and advocacy. The fund goes out to short-term solutions to disabilities instead of long-term solutions such as wealth redistribution and expansive cash transfer programs to households living in multidimensional poverty.

Policies aiming at dismantling structural inequality for PWDs include the Persons with Disabilities Act of 2003 aimed to "provide for the rights and rehabilitation of persons with disabilities; to achieve equalisation of opportunities for persons with disabilities; and to establish the National Council for Persons with Disabilities." This act was enforced in 2010.

Other national policies include the Kenya Vision 2030. The overarching goal of this plan is to transform Kenya into a middle-income country. The social pillar of this plan, emphasizing on the development of better educational, sanitary, housing, cultural, environmental and employment resources, provides special provisions for PWDs. For example, under Basic Education Infrastructure, provisions were made to construct 60 new classrooms in special needs schools.

However, these policies aimed at giving equal rights to PWDs and persons without disabilities lack proper enforcement mechanisms. In addition to the lack of funding, the Kenyan government also lacks information on what conditions qualify as a disability, and notably what conditions qualify as a severe disability.

=== Supranational policies ===
On a supra-national level, Kenya was among the first countries to sign and ratify the United Nations Convention on the Rights of Persons with Disabilities. It was signed on 30 March 2007, and ratified on 19 May 2008. This is the most important piece of international law for PWDs. According to Article 3, the general principles of the convention are the following:

1. Respect for inherent dignity, individual autonomy including the freedom to make one's own choices, and independence of persons;
2. Non-discrimination;
3. Full and effective participation and inclusion in society;
4. Respect for difference and acceptance of persons with disabilities as part of human diversity and humanity;
5. Equality of opportunity;
6. Accessibility;
7. Equality between men and women;
8. Respect for the evolving capacities of children with disabilities and respect for the right of children with disabilities to preserve their identities.

In 2018, the Government of Kenya, the UK Department for International Development, and the International Disability Alliance held the first Global Disability Summit in London. Different public and private actors and organizations were represented. The majority of stakeholders and actors participating were persons with intellectual and physical disabilities.

The four main objectives of this Summit, which were in line with the UN Convention on Persons with Disabilities, were the following:

1. Raise global attention and focus on a neglected area;
2. Bring in new voices and approaches to broaden engagement;
3. Mobilize new global and national commitments on disability;
4. Showcase best practices and evidence from across the world"

More precisely, the four priorities set by stakeholders were:

1. Tackling stigma and discrimination;
2. Inclusion in education;
3. Routes to economic empowerment;
4. Harnessing technology and innovation."

== Access to resources ==
=== Education ===
Kenya signed the UNESCO goals of Education for All in 2000, aiming at improving access to education to PWDs, among other marginalised social groups. Since then, the gross enrollment rate of children with disabilities increased to 10% by 2010. However, there is still an absence of law enforcement and budget spending for the implementation of educational programs and services for PWDs, which has led to target inefficiency in educational policy.

==== Special education ====
The Ministry of Education is responsible for implementing education policies, such as adaptive measures for students with physical and mental disabilities. In the past, adaptive education programs and funds for students with disabilities were mainly carried out by Christian Churches. But the Ministry of Education has implemented many policies to provide special educational resources for students with learning disabilities. In 1986, the MOE established Kenya Institute of Special Education as a semi-autonomous governmental agency. In 2009, the Special Needs Policy framework was put in place in 2009 to make special education, assessment, and educational services more accessible to children and adults with disabilities.

=== Employment ===
Article 27 of the Convention on the Rights of Persons with Disabilities demands signatory states like Kenya to provide free and equal employment to persons with disabilities and to limit societal and physical barriers to employment. But inequalities persist, as 80% of unemployed adults in Kenya are PWDs. Reasons contributing to this include lower educational attainment and lack of the relevant skills, lack of accommodation to and in the workplace, and employers' internalized negative beliefs on persons with disabilities leading to low expectations and pity from the employer.

== Disparities ==
Disability and poverty have mutual effects. Persons with disabilities in Kenya are more likely to be poor, and persons living in poverty are more exposed to developing or transmitting disabilities.

=== Child poverty and disabilities ===
In Kenya, 52% of children under 18 are deprived of 3 to 7 basic needs and 42% live in a poor household. Children with disabilities have a 9 percentage point higher probability of being multidimensionally poor.

Families in poverty with a child with disabilities are likely to be even worse off because of the expenses that disabilities entail. Costly daily expenses include diapers and medication against convulsions for children with cerebral palsy.

There is great interrelationship between child malnutrition caused by poverty and disabilities. Both maternal and child malnutrition and vitamin deficiencies cause physical and intellectual disabilities. Today, over one-quarter of children under five years experience chronic malnutrition, putting many Kenyan children at risk of developing disabilities.

=== Educational disparities ===
Kenya has considerable educational disparities between children with and without disabilities.

According to the UNDP Report of Kenya in 2009, access to education for children with disabilities is severely limited, with only 1.7% able to attend. This is especially true for those living in poverty, as many of the special schools that are designed for their needs are privately owned and lack state subsidies. Consequently, parents of children with disabilities living in poverty bear a significant financial burden, making it challenging for them to send their children to school.

In terms of physical accessibility, another complementary part of the issue is the lack of state-subsidised transport such as adaptive school buses.

Today, 67% of adults in Kenya who have a form of disability have a form of primary education, compared to 85% of people without disabilities.

=== Urban and rural disparities ===
Approximately 9 million people live in extreme poverty in Kenya. 7.8 million live in rural areas, while 1.2 million live in urban areas. General poverty incidence is higher in rural areas than in urban centers.

This urban and rural divide of Kenya entails a difference in access to education, food, healthcare, and employment.

However, living in an urban center does not necessarily entail greater access to these resources. For example, in urban areas, 30% of children with disabilities were not in school compared to 13% of children in rural areas. Similarly, according to the Kenya National Bureau of Statistics, PWDs living in urban areas are 7 percentage points less likely to access health services they require, compared with their rural counterparts.

Inequality between disabled and non-disabled Kenyan citizens is actually greater in more developed areas of the country than less developed.

== Disabilities in Kenyan society ==
=== Traditional beliefs on disabilities ===
Traditional beliefs on disabilities and the stigma caused by them are an important factor determining the attitudes of Kenyans towards PWDs, and what and who PWDs can do and be in society.

Some beliefs are nation-wide, such as the belief that disability is contagious. It is also believed that disabilities are caused by witchcraft cursed upon the mother.

It is widely believed in Kenya that disabilities are caused by taboo activities such as rape, adultery, or incest. It is equally widely believed that the disability is transmitted by the mother more than the father.

Beliefs vary across the different counties of Kenya. For example, the Turkana people believed that a child born with disabilities is a gift from God. Conversely, the Kakamega people commonly believed that disability is an intergenerational curse.

Kenyans, including healthcare personnel, believed that witchcraft was one of the causes of seizures experienced by persons with special needs.

Beliefs about mental or neurological disabilities such as cerebral palsy help family members determine how their child or relative with the disability will be able to lead their life. For example, families believe epilepsy makes it impossible for their child to marry in the future. Even mild forms of disability are stigmatised, and children are denied access to regular public education. The school systems believe that the school setting and programs are not adapted to disabilities.

In some Kenyan communities, physical disabilities also make it hard for the person to feel part of the community. Because disabilities are a barrier to employment and physical work, many communities do not fully accept PWDs because they are unable to contribute to the community.

=== Family structure ===
The Kenyan National Survey for Persons with Disabilities of 2009 reported that 52.6% of the parents of children with disabilities were single, 48.6% were married, 32% were divorced or separated, and 11.8% were widowed.

Child abandonment rates, notably of fathers, are higher in Kenya because of the cost that raising a child with disabilities induces and the stigmas around them. Fathers of households living in poverty are more likely to abandon their child and family when discovering that their child is disabled than if the child did not have a disability. In a study on Kitengela Norkopir village residents, it was found that out of the 54 special needs children living in the village, 98% were under full care of their mothers.

Fathers also abandon their children and remarry because of the stigma that the mother is cursed.

=== Social risks ===
Kenyans with disabilities are exposed to different risks throughout their life. Because of the different intersectionalities such as poverty and disability, age and disability, or gender and disability, some PWDs are even more vulnerable than others.

Children with disabilities in Kenya are more likely to experience violence than children without disabilities. Having a mental disability such as Down syndrome and being unable to express oneself without support, make it more likely for a child to be violated.

Women with disabilities are more likely to face domestic abuse and violence than their non-disabled peers. They are 2 to 4 times more likely to face Intimate Partner Violence.

== Social support ==
There are many non-governmental national and regional movements and unions for PWDs in Kenya. The Kenya Union of the Blind was created in 1959. Its early forms of protestation and mobilization influenced the organization of the Mwendwa Committee for the Care and Rehabilitation of the Disabled, a 1964 government panel.

There is also the United Disabled Persons of Kenya umbrella foundation to promote equal opportunities as well as economic and political participation. This organization serves as an advocate for more inclusive national policies and now works with the government to draft theses policies. For example, the UDPK advocated for the implementation of the Persons With Disabilities Act of 2003.

Other forms of social support include local organizations. For instance, Child Destiny Foundation is a non-profit organization founded in 2013

to provide physiotherapy for special needs children in the slum of Kibera, in Nairobi.

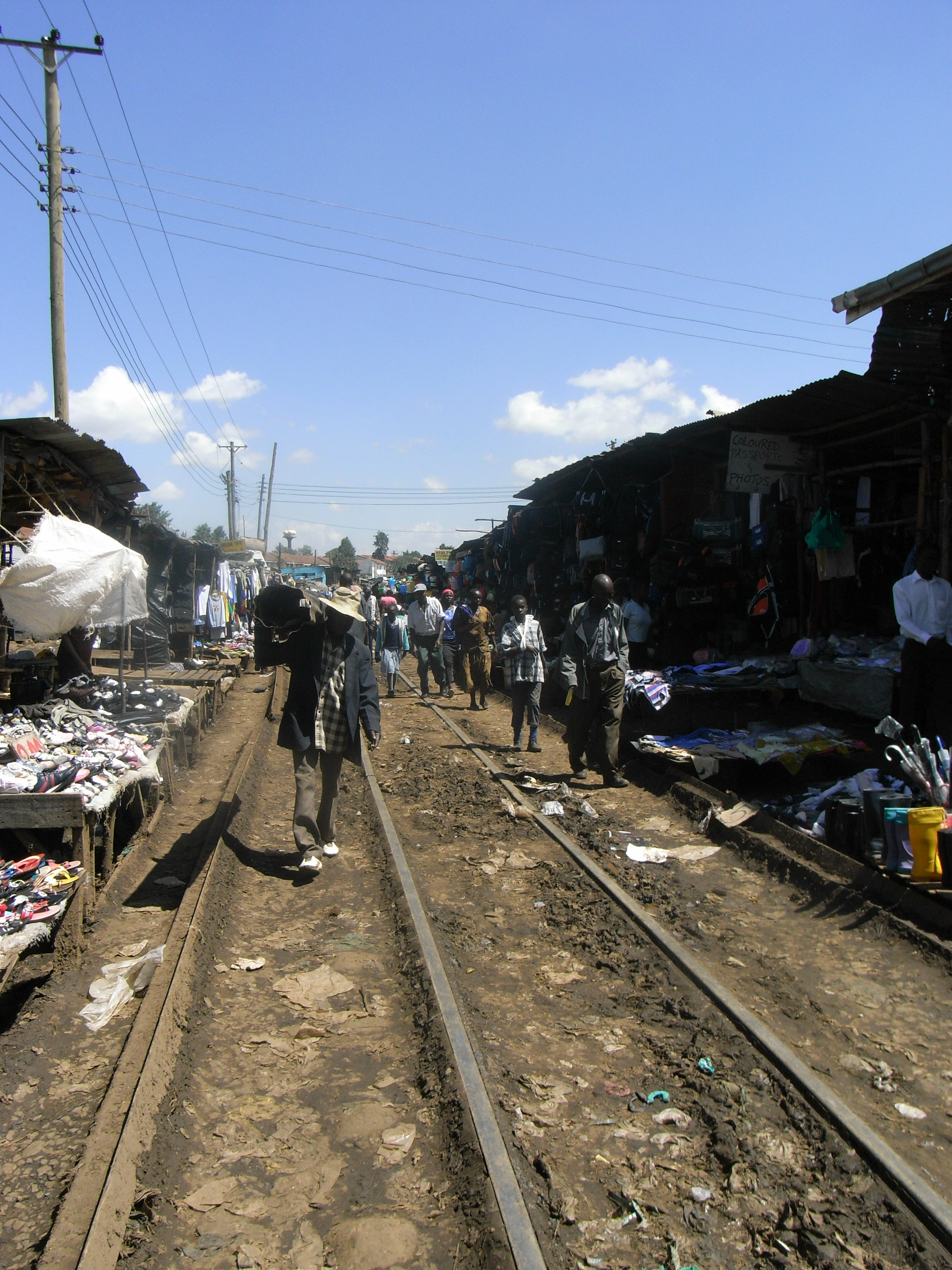
Slum of Kibera, Nairobi
