= Peanut App =

App for women to meet and find support

- Type: Social Networking App
- Founder: Michelle Kennedy
- Headquarters: London, UK
- Key people: Michelle Kennedy, CEO
- Products: Internet friendship app, website
- Number of employees: 31
- Website: www.peanut-app.io

Peanut, a product of Peanut App Ltd. is an online community for women who are planning to become pregnant, women who are pregnant, women who have had children, and women who are experiencing menopause. Profiles of potential friends are displayed to users who can swipe up to show intent to connect. Users can also connect via discussion threads, groups, and live audio conversations. The app allows users to select their stage of life (trying to conceive, pregnancy, motherhood, or menopause), so as to meet women at a similar life stage, and to discover relevant content.

Peanut was founded by Michelle Kennedy shortly after she left Bumble, a female-first dating app. She has described Peanut as, "the app she wishes she had when she first became a mother".

== History ==
Peanut was initially launched in 2017 for mothers and pregnant women. The app focuses on helping users find others with shared interests, such as spoken languages, occupations, and hobbies. It also displays a woman's life stage, such as the age of her children, or the stage of pregnancy.

In 2018, it launched a community discussion feature that intended to give women an "alternative to other social platforms". In 2019, it started to serve women who are trying to conceive.

In April 2021, it integrated live audio, in response to the COVID-19 pandemic, and the restrictions around in-person socializing.

in September 2021, it started to include women who are navigating perimenopause, menopause, and postmenopausal. Although it had initially catered for younger women navigating into new families, a large number of users had undergone surgically or chemically induced menopause due to medical conditions.

In July 2021, Peanut launched an investment micro fund, Peanut StartHER, focused on investing in women-owned businesses, as well as other historically excluded founders.

== Operation ==
The Peanut app is a social network exclusively for women, focusing on topics of pregnancy, motherhood, fertility, and menopause. It is available on iOS and Android devices. Users must prove their identity, in keeping with the primary function of in-app safety, and then they can create a profile to interact with other users.

For pregnant users, the “Bump Buddies” feature helps connect them with other Peanut users who have a similar due date, which aimed to help expecting mothers combat loneliness during the COVID-19 pandemic.

Peanut users also have the option to join “Groups” ‒ sub-sections of users focused on specific topics, including (but not limited to) location, life stage, pregnancy due date, and interests or hobbies.

The live voice chat feature “Pods”, enables Peanut users to socialize without the pressure of photos or video chat. It offers features such as a muted audience of listeners who need to virtually raise their hand to speak, emoji reactions, and hosts who can moderate the conversations and invite people to speak.
