= Woman-owned business =

Organizational certification

A woman-owned business is a specific designation used by government agencies and industry associations to identify a business organization owned and operated by female business owners. Most definitions of this term involve a practical look at the legal and ownership structure, as well as the issue of control of the day-to-day operations of a business. In the United States, Canada, and under the World Bank's We-Fi program, the usual threshold is at least 51% ownership by one or more women, combined with control of management and daily operations.

== Support for woman business owners ==
Research shows that in most countries there are significant challenges for women business owners in comparison to men business owners. These challenges stem from many sources, including social and cultural stigmas, family and child-rearing responsibilities, maternity needs, educational background, career experience, and community support. Depending on the country in which a woman resides and/or is a citizen, there may be government or non-profit support for female business owners.

=== United States ===
There are several U.S. organizations that provide third-party women-owned certifications and support including: U.S. Women's Chamber of Commerce, The SHE Mark, Women's Business Enterprise National Council (WBENC), the Supplier Clearinghouse of the California Public Utilities Commission, which certifies women-owned firms under General Order 156, Women's Business Entrepreneur Council (WBE council), and the National Women Business Owners Corporation.

=== Canada ===
Canada's federal Women Entrepreneurship Strategy, launched in 2018, comprises nearly C$7 billion in investments and commitments to help women access financing, networks and expertise. According to the government, 17.8% of Canadian small and medium-sized businesses are owned by women.

=== United Kingdom ===
National initiatives to support the growth of women's business ownership include Prowess in the UK. In 2018 HM Treasury commissioned Alison Rose to lead an independent review of female entrepreneurship. The Rose Review, published on 8 March 2019, estimated that up to £250 billion could be added to the UK economy if women started and scaled businesses at the same rate as men, and led to the creation of the Investing in Women Code. A 2025 House of Commons Women and Equalities Committee inquiry found that subsequent initiatives had been insufficient in scale and called for a national female entrepreneurship strategy.

=== India ===
In India, supporting groups include WeConnect, WEI, and some specific bank-sponsored loan schemes. The Stand-Up India scheme, launched on 5 April 2016, requires each bank branch to lend between ₹10 lakh and ₹1 crore to at least one woman and one Scheduled Caste or Scheduled Tribe entrepreneur for a greenfield enterprise; for non-individual enterprises, women must hold at least 51% of shareholding and control. By March 2023 more than ₹40,700 crore had been sanctioned to over 180,000 accounts, the large majority of them women.

=== European Union ===
In Europe, the Entrepreneurship 2020 Action Plan is aimed at supporting women business owners, among other initiatives.

=== International ===
The Women Entrepreneurs Finance Initiative (We-Fi), announced at the July 2017 G20 summit in Hamburg and hosted by the World Bank Group, is a partnership of 14 donor governments and multilateral development banks supporting women-owned small and medium enterprises in developing countries; donors have committed about US$355 million.

== Difficulties women-owned businesses face ==
A significant and well-documented barrier facing woman-owned businesses is access to capital. According to the OECD, women entrepreneurs are approximately half as likely as men to report having borrowed funds from a bank to start, operate or expand a businesses, and businesses owned by women only receive about 2% of total venture capital investments. Research from the Harvard Kennedy School found that female founders generally receive approximately a quarter of the funding they seek, while their male counterparts receive roughly half on average, despite female-founded ventures performing comparably to male-founded ones when controlling for sector, market experience and hours worked.

== United States women-owned businesses ==
According to the U.S. Census Bureau's 2023 Annual Business Survey, women owned about 1.3 million U.S. employer firms in 2022, or 22.3 percent of the total. These businesses had an estimated $2.1 trillion in receipts, 11.4 million employees, and $508.5 billion in annual payroll.

=== United States federal contracts ===
There are specific set-aside programs for certain NAICS codes in which certified WOSBs (or in some cases Economically Disadvantaged Women-Owned Small Businesses (EDWOSB), a subcategory of WOSB) may receive special consideration in a U.S. government contract. According to OpenSecrets, the Federal government of the United States gave $25.4 billion in federal contracts to women-owned businesses in 2017, this was 5 percent of the total budget in the fiscal year. This was up from 3.25 percent of contracts in fiscal year 2008.

=== Women-Owned Business Enterprise ===
In the United States, a Woman-Owned Business Enterprise (WBE) is defined as one that is at least 51% owned, operated and controlled on a daily basis by one or more female American citizens. WBEs are typically certified by a third-party, city, state or federal agency. The Small Business Administration offers a similar definition of a Women-Owned Small Business (WOSB) as a small business that is at least 51% owned, operated and controlled on a daily basis by one or more (in combination) female American citizens. The SBA's WOSB definition differentiates from the WBE definition, as it looks at the size of the business according to the specific industry standards table.

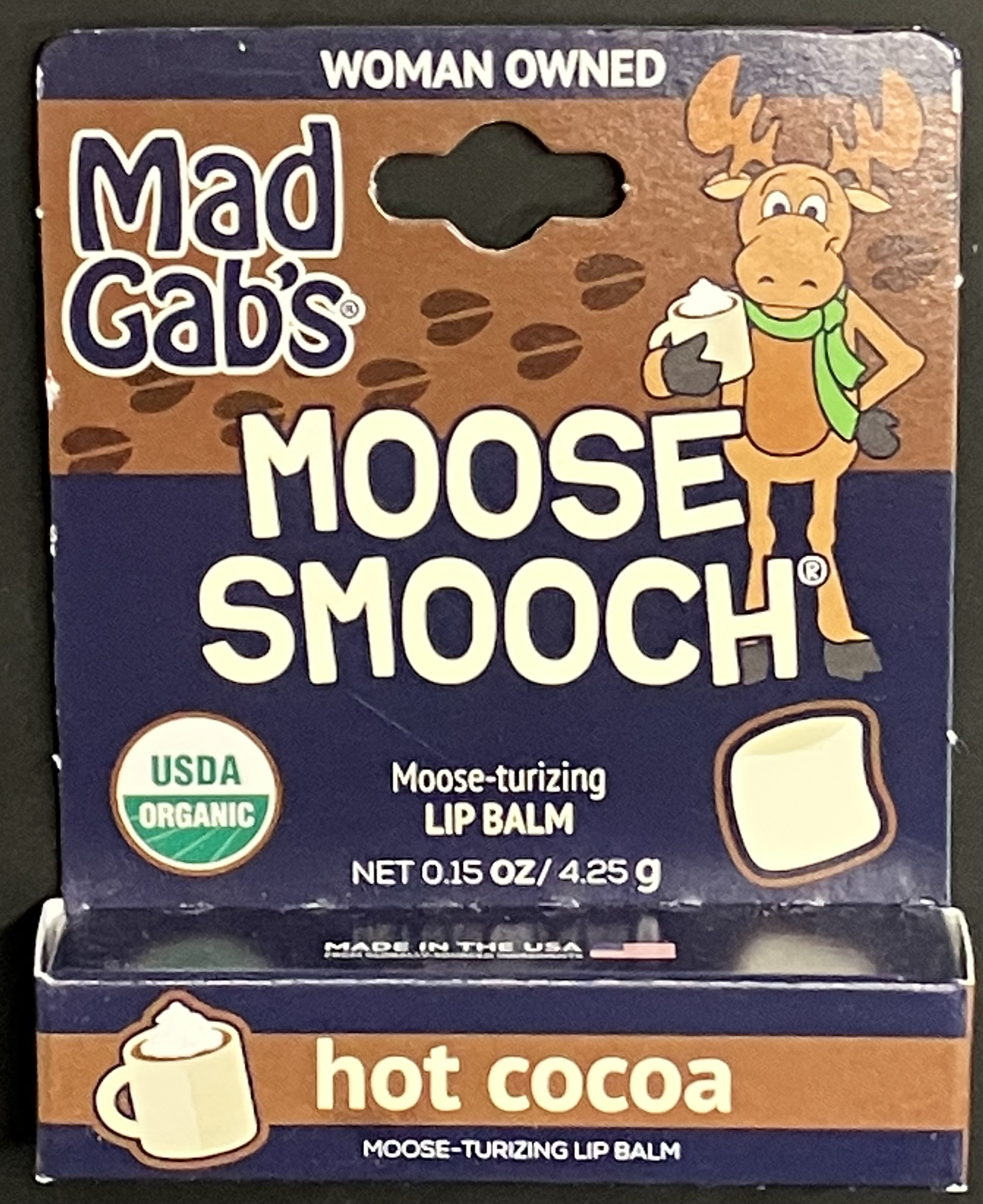
Example of an independent lip balm company that states "Woman Owned" clearly at the top of the package

== "Women Owned" in marketing ==
Some companies have deemed it to be beneficial to advertise that the business is primarily or exclusively owned by woman as part of an additional benefit for consumers to do business with the "Woman Owned" business and buy the goods or services of the business. As of 2019, the Women's Business Enterprise National Council estimated that over 200 products displayed a logo indicating the company was certified as being "women owned". A study conducted by Walmart in 2014 found that "90% of female shoppers said they would go out of their way to buy a product marked as 'women-owned'".

== See also ==
- Minority business enterprise
- Gender representation on corporate boards of directors
- Women's Business Ownership Act
- Supplier diversity
- Equal Credit Opportunity Act
- Female entrepreneurs
