= Bertram Morneweg =

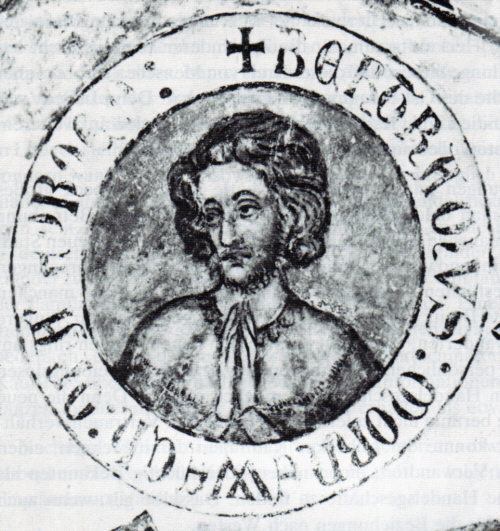
13th-century wall painting of Morneweg

Bertram Morneweg (also Bartram Morgenweg; died 1286) was a Lübeck businessman and councilor.

== Life ==
Little is known about his resume. Unverified records state that he was adopted as an orphan by the Lübeck citizen and merchant Marquard von Bardewik and thus had a career in long-distance trade.

A certificate issued in the fall of 1271 in Lynn, England, gave his name; however, his alleged long-term stay at the Peterhof in Novgorod is undetectable. Regardless of the details of his career, it is clear that Morneweg was a successful businessman and had acquired an unusual fortune when he settled back in Lübeck and married Gertrud Morneweg (died 1301). His capital at the time of his death was about 13,500 Lübische Marks. His widow continued to do business and increased her fortune.

Morneweg participated in various trading companies and became a member of the Lübeck Council. In 1286 he was sent to England by the Council. He also was among the founders of the Heiligen-Geist-Hospital, where today a mural in the donor gallery is probably his individual portrait. The donor gallery of the Heiligen-Geist-Hospital is the oldest picture cycle with portraits of Lübeck councilors and merchants.

His son Hermann Morneweg became mayor of Lübeck in 1312.
