= Businessperson =

Person involved in activities for profit

Businessman
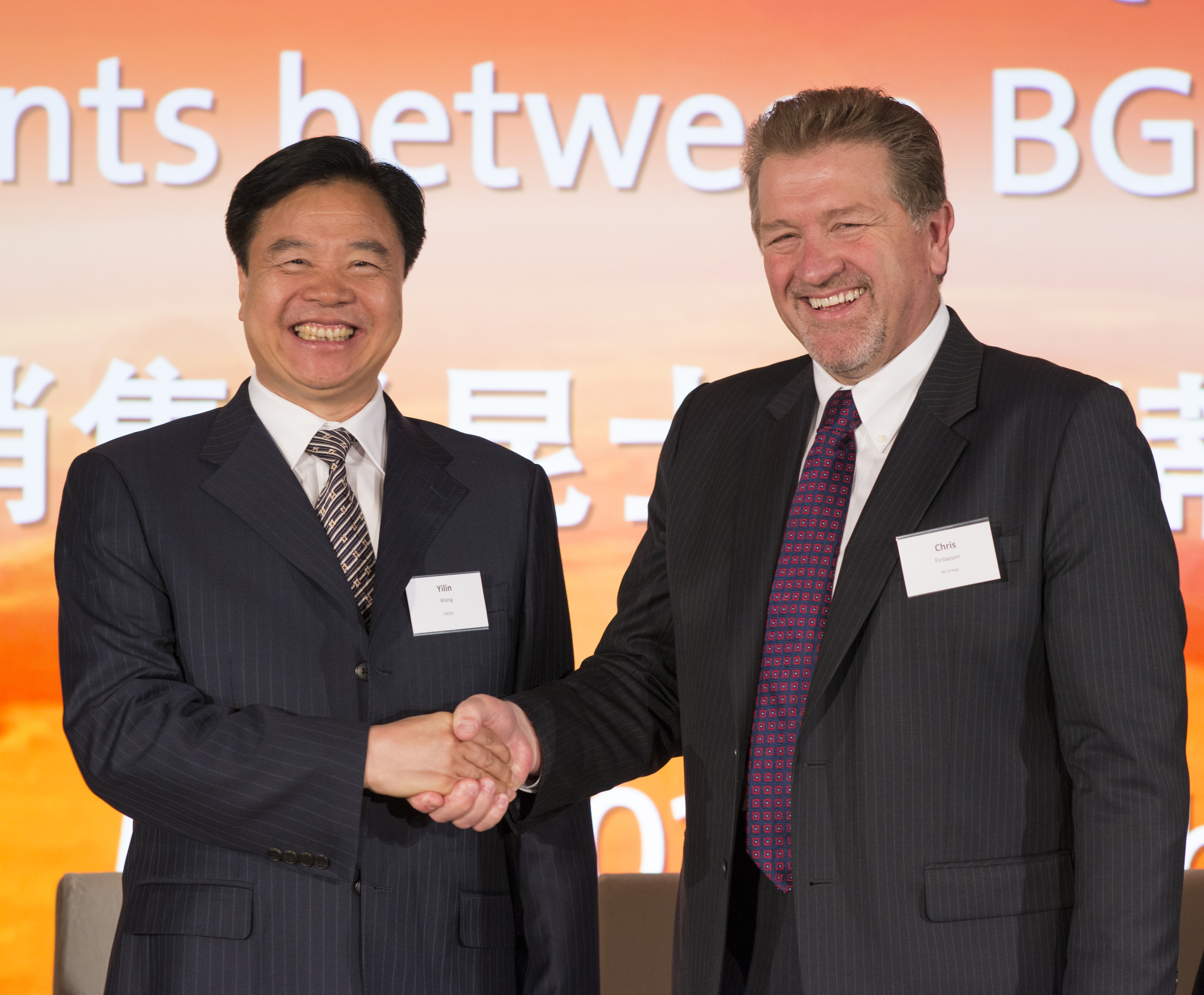
- CNOOC Group Chairman Wang Yilin (left) shaking hands with BG Group CEO Chris Finlayson in 2013

Occupation
- Occupation type: Business
- Activity sectors: Private

Description
- Competencies: Innovation; Risk Taking Ability; Critical thinking; Goal seeking; Networking; Persuasion; Perseverance; Leadership
- Education required: Qualification is not required

A businessperson, also referred to as a businessman or businesswoman, is an individual who has founded, owns, or holds shares in (including as an angel investor) a private-sector company. A businessperson undertakes activities (commercial or industrial) to generate cash flow, sales, and revenue by using a combination of human, financial, intellectual, and physical capital to fuel economic development and growth.

== History ==
=== Medieval period: Rise of the merchant class ===
Merchants emerged as a social class in medieval Italy. Between 1300 and 1500, modern accounting, the bill of exchange, and limited liability were invented, and thus, the world saw "the first true bankers", who were certainly businesspeople.

Around the same time, Europe saw the "emergence of rich merchants." This "rise of the merchant class" came as Europe "needed a middleman" for the first time, and these "burghers" or "bourgeois" were the people who played this role.

=== Renaissance to Enlightenment: Rise of the capitalist ===
Europe became the dominant global commercial power in the 16th century, and as Europeans developed new tools for business, new types of "business people" began to use those tools. In this period, Europe developed and used paper money, cheques, and joint-stock companies (and their shares of capital stock). Developments in actuarial science and underwriting led to insurance. Together, these new tools were used by a new kind of businessperson, the capitalist. These people owned or financed businesses as investors, but they were not merchants of goods. These capitalists were a major force in the Industrial Revolution.

The Oxford English Dictionary reports the earliest known use of the word "business-men" in 1798, and of "business-man" in 1803. By 1860, the spelling "businessmen" had emerged.

Merriam Webster reports the earliest known use of the word "businesswoman" in 1827.

=== Modern period: Rise of the business magnate ===
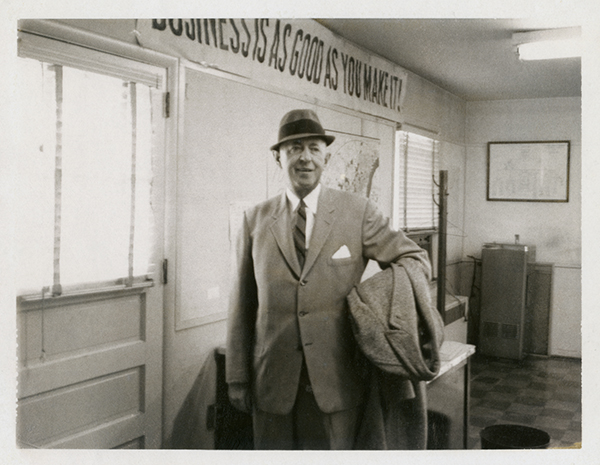
Frank Carr c. 1965

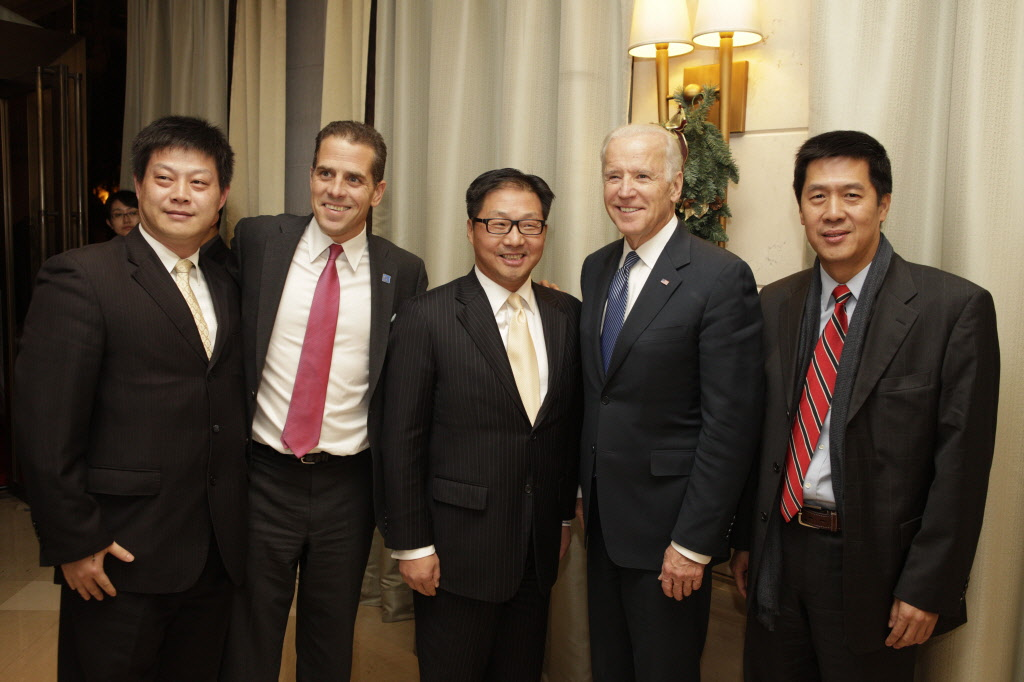
Hunter Biden and Joe Biden in China with BHR Partners CEO and managing partners, 2013

The newest kind of corporate executive working under a business magnate is the manager. One of the first true founders of the management profession was Robert Owen (1771–1858). He was also a business magnate in Scotland. He studied the "problems of productivity and motivation", and was followed by Frederick Winslow Taylor (1856–1915), who was the first person who studied work with the motive to train his staff in the field of management to make them efficient managers capable of managing his business. After World War I, management became popular due to the example of Herbert Hoover and the Harvard Business School, which offered degrees in business administration (management) with the motive to develop efficient managers so that business magnates could hire them with the goal to increase productivity of the private establishments business magnates own.

== Salary ==
Salaries for businesspeople vary. The salaries of businesspeople can be as high as billions of dollars per year. For example, the owner of Microsoft, Bill Gates makes $4 billion per year. The high salaries which businesspeople earn have often been a source of criticism from many who believe they are paid excessively.

== Entrepreneurship ==
An entrepreneur is a person who sets up a business or multiple businesses (serial entrepreneur). Entrepreneurship may be defined as the creation or extraction of economic value. It is generally thought to embrace risks beyond what is normally encountered in starting a business. Its motivation can include other values than simply economic ones. In general usage, because the distinction is not clear-cut, the term 'entrepreneur' may be used as a (self-)promoting euphemism for 'businessperson', or it may serve to objectively indicate particular passion and risk-taking in a business field. Still, the distinction is only one by degrees.

== See also ==
- Business magnate
- Business
- Entrepreneur
- Media proprietor
- Corporate
- Salaryman
- White-collar worker
- Women in business
  - Ahaha
