= Poverty in Kenya =

Kenya is a lower middle income economy, with Kenya's GDP hitting $121 billion as of 2024. This is due to increasing technology innovation services. Although Kenya's economy is the largest and most developed in eastern and Central Africa, 25% (2023/2024) of its population lives below the international poverty line. This severe poverty is caused by economic inequality, government corruption and health problems. In turn, poverty also worsens these factors. The Kenyan government's efforts to address poverty have received help from international institutions as well. The incident rate of poverty has steadily decreased, as shown by a recent MPI index.

== Definition and measures of poverty ==
=== Meaning of poverty ===
Poverty is a condition that someone lacks materials or money and has an exceptionally low level of standard of living. It is a complicated concept, reflected by many aspects including social, economic and political factors.

=== Multidimensional poverty index ===
The Global Multidimensional Poverty Index (MPI) incorporates 11 variables to explore poverty in three dimensions i.e. standard of living, education and health. It is more scientific and practical to measure poverty as it reflects both incidence rate and the degree to which a population is deprived. The 2014 global MPI data shows that the number of Kenyans being MPI poor is 39.9%, indicated by the headcount ratio. This implies that poverty still is a severe issue in Kenya.

According to the information from OPHI Country Briefing 2017, poor people in Kenya are significantly deprived in the living standard dimension, especially of cooking fuel, electricity, and sanitation indicators. In addition, poverty differs between different regions, and the percentage of MPI Poor deprivation in rural areas is higher than that in urban areas.

== Dynamic poverty in Kenya ==
The following information mainly focuses on trends of Kenya's poverty from 1990 to 2007.

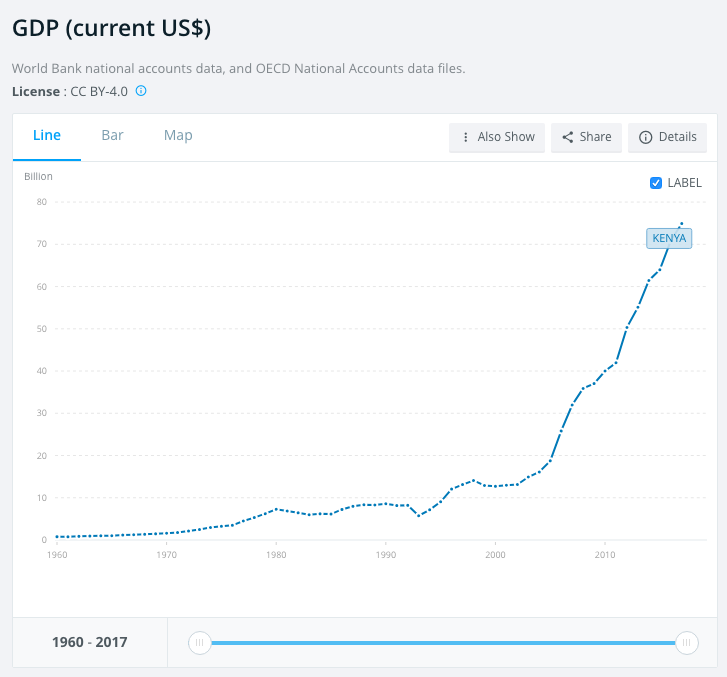
The diagram shows trends in the gross domestic product of Kenya from 1960 to 2017.

In the 1990s, the reduction by about 5% in GDP growth rate indicated that Kenya's economic become stagnant and even shrunk. The teetering economy made the poverty issue much more severe, reflected by a 12% ascending poverty incidence rate from 2000 to 2003. In order to address the issue, the government introduced some policies, such as National Poverty Eradication Plan and Poverty Reduction Strategy. However, due to ineffective implementation, it failed to alleviate poverty radically.

After the new government taking office in 2003, there were early signs of economic recovery in Kenya. The annual GDP growth rate continued to increase during the period from 2003 to 2007. Owing to the success of the Economic Recovery Strategy developed by the new government, children had access to free primary education. To some extent, improved education level and an economic boom have eased the poverty in Kenya.

== Economic condition and poverty ==
Kenya has the largest economy in the East African region with a gross domestic product of 74.8 billion US dollars in 2017. The leading GDP sectors of Kenya's economy are Services (53%), Agriculture (29%), and Industry (18%).

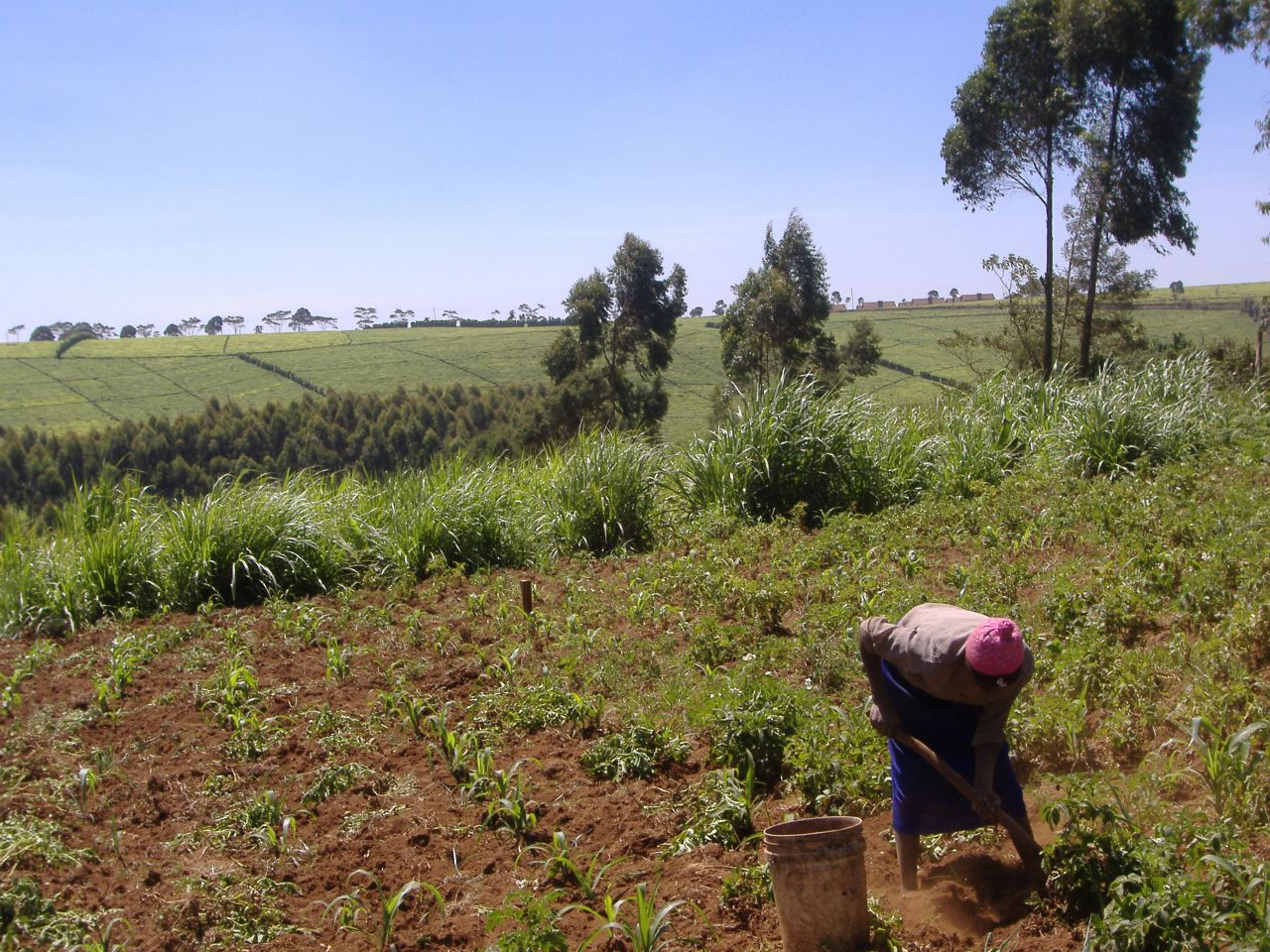
Woman harvesting potatoes on a small-scale farm

Although less than 20% of the land is suitable for cultivation, the agriculture industry has an important role in Kenya's economy. However, unpredictable weather and outdated technology make the agricultural sector erratic. In Kenya, 80% of the land is classified as arid and semi-arid, where there is highly variable rainfall and frequent droughts. More than a quarter of the population and half of livestock live in these areas. In times of serious drought, the government spends an average of 50 dollars per family in relief supplies.

There was a severe drought in Kenya that began in October 2016. In April 2017, the drought was declared a national emergency by the Kenyan government. The drought resulted in a slump in the production of the staple crop (maize), and more than 2 million people were in need of food aid.

Droughts reduce crop and livestock production, cause financial losses in agriculture and increase unemployment rates. Declines in food production force the government to provide food assistance, incurring extra expenditures in the national budget. All these situations increase poverty issues in Kenya.

== Disability and poverty ==
There is great mutual correlation and causation between disabilities and poverty in Kenya. Adults aged 18 to 34 with disabilities have a 15-percentage point higher probability of being multidimensionally poor than adults without disabilities.

Because 40% of Kenyans are multidimensionally poor, and 20% are living in extreme poverty today, Kenyans are more likely to have a disability. Mental and physical disabilities can be caused or worsened by the proxies of poverty. These include poor access to healthcare facilities, malnutrition, and consumption of contaminated water. Unsafe work conditions and work incidents can also lead to temporary or permanent disabilities.

== Social inequality and poverty ==
Kenya is an upper-middle income country with inequality in wealth distribution, poverty level and human rights aspects.

Kenya's inequality is reflected by share of income and social services varying among different segments of the population. One-tenth of Kenyans have approximately two-fifths of total wealth. The wealth gap has not narrowed in recent years, even though the statistics show that the economy has grown by 19 percent. Disclosed by the World Bank in 2015, Kenya's Gini index was 40.8%, indicating the unequal distribution of income. Distribution of wealth continues to be a challenge to Kenya, because income inequality is a factor leading to social conflicts, violence, and crime, which aggravates social instability and poverty issues.

In addition, the poverty level is unequal in different regions. Measured by MPI, the percentage of poor people is much lower in the capital city. Compared to that, some large secondary cities’ percentage of poor people is much higher. For instance, there is 44% of population in Mombasa is relatively poor. In addition to the huge inequality between different level of cities, inequalities in poverty level exists within cities. For example, in Nairobi, the capital city of Kenya, Kileleshwa's location level poverty is under 5%, while location level poverty of Korogocho and Laini Saba excess 60%.

== Gender inequality and poverty ==
Kenya has significant gender inequality and Kenyan women continue to advocate for their equal right to property, security, financial services, healthcare, and education.

Women may still need their spouse or father's consent before accessing a healthcare provider or taking time off from their traditional household roles. Most institutions providing healthcare in Kenya afford women very little say over their own bodies; they may be forced to undergo abortions or female circumcision. They also risk the chance of being reported to authorities if the physician believes that they were engaging in prostitution or drug use.

Women also lack a basic education in Kenya and very few go on to higher education. Nearly 60% of young women do not attend secondary school either because there is no school close by or the school has little in the way of educational resources. Even in schools, teachers put more value on teaching boys than girls, which usually allows men to be significantly more educated and access higher levels of education, while women are left behind.

Financial services and property rights are also still limited, as women have very little access to the basic needs and legal rights to start a business or live self-sufficiently. Only 1% of Kenyan women own property and there are few women in business. They also have little to no voice when speaking with city councils.

== Government corruption and poverty ==
Corruption remains a severe issue in Kenya. Of the 180 countries participating in the assessment of the corruption perceptions index, Kenya was ranked at 143 with the score of 28 in 2017. The score of Kenya for the past five years has varied between 25 and 28, implying that corruption is still a serious problem. Kenya's corruption is prevalent within all levels of government.

Studies have found that Kenya is one of the most crime-infested countries in Africa. One of reasons is that even the police help crime. Especially in some rural areas, the police provide arms to criminals, assist to transfer stolen goods and release arrested criminals if criminals bribe the police. The increasing criminal rate leads to instability of the society that directly reduces economic growth and further causes poverty problems.

Apart from bribe-taking, improper government expenditure and illegal possession of public resources by senior government officials also worsen Kenya's corruption .

Some authority institutions, such as judiciary and legislature, are also considered as the channels of corruption. In the major reforms in 2011, many unqualified judges were removed from their positions. Not strictly obeying the law is a common phenomenon in Kenya, and this type of phenomenon gives rise to cynicism and undermines social value, because instead of following the legitimate process, people in Kenya often find it easier to use corruption to solve problems. The society in Kenya, without authoritative orders and binding regulations, fails to establish effective social order and make good use of all public resources, which leads to poverty.

== Health problems and poverty ==
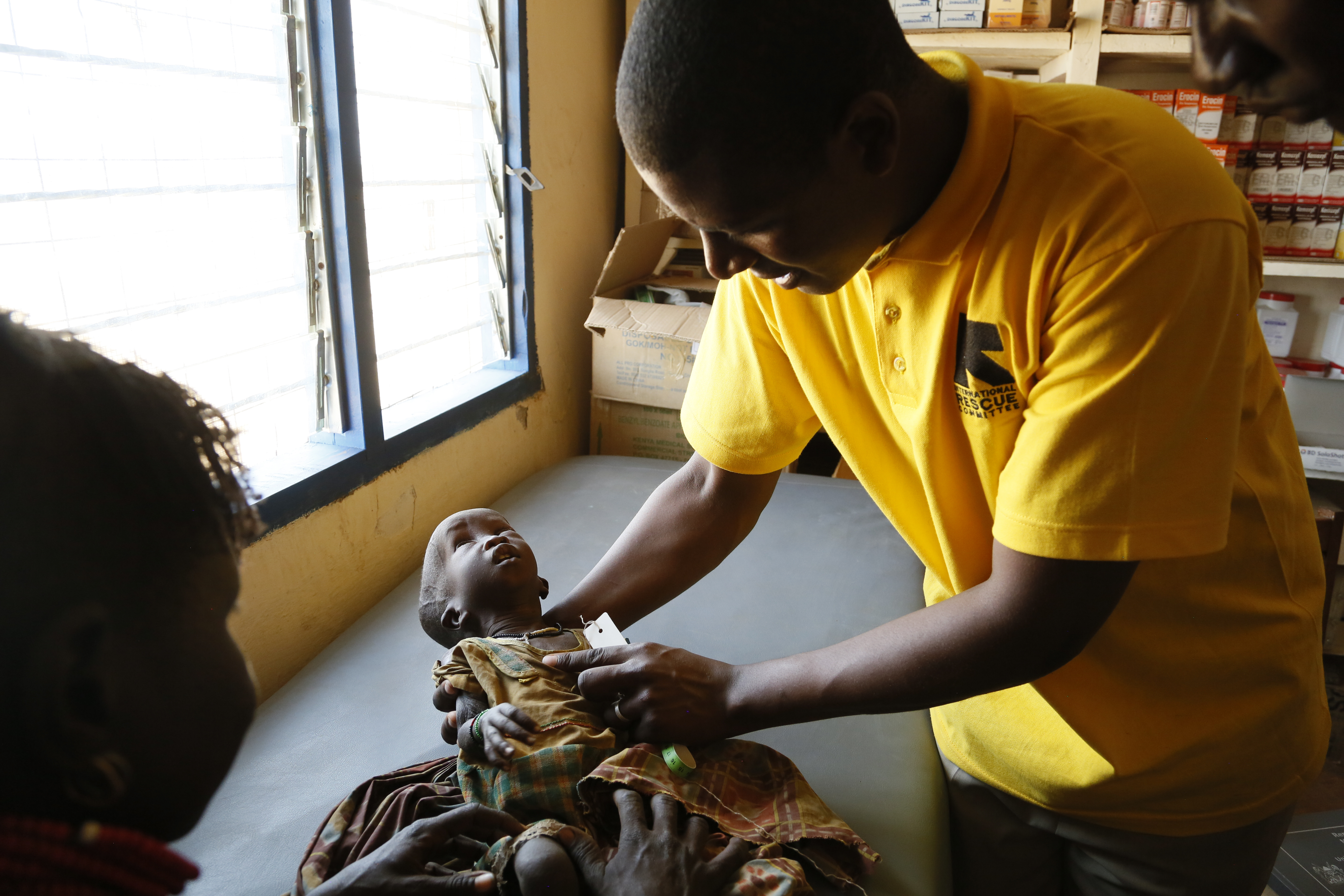
Baby that is malnourished due to living situations in Kenya

Addressing health problems remains a challenge for Kenya's government. Diseases that spread in the society reduce productivity and increases the health care expenditure of government, which worsens the poverty in Kenya.

According to the data from Kenya National Bureau of Statistics, diseases including pneumonia, HIV and malaria are the main causes of mortality, which brings about 11.5%, 16.1% and 11.5% of deaths in the total register deaths respectively. In particular, Kenya is ranked 4th among countries with the highest HIV infections in the world with 1.6 million people infected with HIV.

People with poor health condition decrease household incomes and increase medical expenditure, which may cause households to fall into poverty. HIV and malaria are especially prevalent in marginal areas, such as the Western and Nyanza Provinces. More than three-fifths of households in Kenya fall into poverty due to these diseases. Furthermore, decreasing available workforces and increasing government expenditures further strains the economy and worsens poverty.

== Water problems and poverty ==
Data from the Society for International Development shows that although half of Kenya's people have access to improved water supply, there are over 19 million Kenyans still drinking unimproved water, such as unsafe water from rivers. Besides, there is large inequality in access of safe water. There are about 30 percent more improved water sites in urban areas than in rural areas.

One of major causes of water crisis in Kenya is frequent droughts. The Society for International Development has revealed that rivers are the most common supply of Kenya's drinking water. However, more than half of Kenya's regions are classified as arid and are very arid areas with annual average rainfall at a very low level, and global warming exacerbates this situation. Rivers are an unstable source of water, especially in a dry climate period. Droughts damage Kenya's agricultural economy, cause famine and result in even worse hygienic conditions.

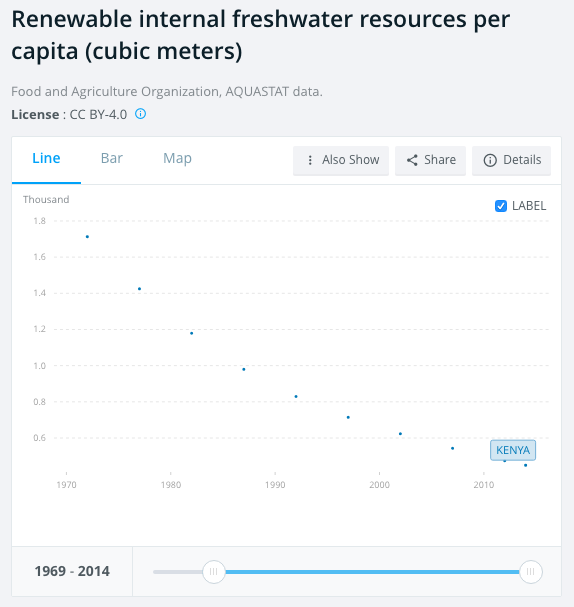
According to data from the World Bank, renewable internal freshwater resources have been decreasing from 1970 to now.

Kenya is classified as a water limited country. According to data from the World Bank, the amount of renewable internal freshwater resources per capita has been decreasing from past to now and it has declined to under 450 cubic meters per capita in 2014. According to the research conducted by Kimani-Murage and Ngindu in 2007, the main activities that cause contamination of water in Kenya are washing clothes in rivers, pouring pollutants into rivers and using unclean containers to get water. These are especially common in rural areas and some urban slums. People in these areas often have no cleaner options. High population growth rate and inappropriate water policy also make the water problem more severe.

Unsafe water can cause diseases like bilharzia, cholera, and diarrhea, while stagnant water is a breeding ground for mosquitoes that cause malaria infections to skyrocket. Shown by MSF clinic, three-fifths of all consultation is classified as caused by poor sanitation diseases. Over 5 thousand children die from water-related diseases per day.

Due to the severe water crisis, many Kenyans’ basic standards of living are not guaranteed, and incidences of related diseases are high, which increases financial burden on the government and exacerbates poverty.

== Poverty reduction ==
=== National Poverty Eradication Plan ===
With the assistance of the Commission of Poverty Eradication and Poverty Eradication Unit, the National Poverty Eradication provided various poverty reduction programmes to help reduce poverty in Kenya. It attempted to increase the poor households' living standard. For instance, for householders with low income that were unable to have access to safe food, health care and education, implements of the plan improved their condition through using money from the exchequer. Objectives of the NPEP involved wide aspects, such as universal education, primary health care, safe drinking water and abolishing the gap between rural and urban social development. They are monitored by Anti-Poverty Trust Fund.

=== Economic Recovery Strategy ===
In 2003, the Kenya's government launched the Economic Recovery Strategy, which focused on three areas; the economy, equity and reformation of governance.

Due to the success of the strategy in the economic area, fiscal deficit and stock of non-performing loans have decreased, implying the more stable economic structure. In addition, the government encourages the private sector to be actively involved in offering infrastructure services.

To alleviate poverty, the government succeeded in achieving the goal of universal primary education. It enlarged the scope of health services and water services, which reduced the incident rate of HIV and other epidemic diseases and improved the living condition of poor people. In addition, the government created more jobs and helped people living in arid areas address the unstable weather effects on agriculture.

To complete the sound management system, the ERS attempted to drive judicial reform and transformation of government functions, which further helped establish a stable social order and increase transparency in government affairs.

=== Kenya Vision 2030 ===
Launched in 2008 by President Mwai Kibaki, Kenya Vision 2030 aims to transform Kenya into an actively modernizing middle-income country that provides a better quality of life for every Kenyan by 2030. As the plan is based on four pillars—economic and macro, social, and political—Vision 2030 works to provide more democratic solutions to societal problems. Small and medium-sized businesses are seen as key to economic development; for example, Vision 2030 will make fertilizer available to small farmers by building a local fertilizer plant. In the political arena, Vision 2030 emphasizes the new 2010 Kenyan Constitution which mandates that women get 1/3 representation in parliament. Lastly, they aim to provide more access to primary education through increased funding and reconstruction of primary schools in more rural geographic areas.

== See also ==
- List of counties of Kenya by poverty rate
