= Women's Business Ownership Act =

1988 business law for women in the United States

The Women's Business Ownership Act of 1988 was an act of the United States Congress introduced by John LaFalce aimed at aiding the success of women business entrepreneurs. It provides a basis for policies, programs, and public/private sector initiatives supporting women's business endeavors. The bill was signed into law on October 25, 1988. For much of history, women were excluded from the business world, but at the time of the legislation women were becoming entrepreneurs at a fast rate. The market contains many inequities that influence the success women in business are able to achieve. Sexual stereotyping and past societal barriers result in women not having the same access to ownership or control. The Women's Business Ownership Act was drafted in response to the Small Business Committee's series of six hearings on problems facing women entrepreneurs and follows the recommendations outlined in the Committee report "New Economic Realities: The Rise of Women Entrepreneurs." within business opportunities for women.

== Congressional Findings ==
The Congressional Committee identified four barriers to women owned businesses that they wished to address.

1. "the need for technical training to maximize growth potential of women-owned business"
2. "inequality of access to commercial credit"
3. "virtual exclusion of women-owned business from government procurement activities"
4. "inadequacy of information and data relative to women-owned business"

These findings were included in the Committee Report 100-736, which was filed on June 28, 1988. Findings like this are critical in order to formulate the basis for public policies and programs in order to benefit women entrepreneurs.

== List of organizations that endorsed the legislation ==
- National Federation of Independent Businesses
- National Small Business United
- Small Business Legislative Council
- National Association of Women Business Owners
- National Federation of Business and Professional Women's Clubs
- Women's Equity Action League
- Black Women's Agenda

== Outcomes of the Women's Business Ownership Act ==
=== Women's Business Centers ===
The Women's Business Ownership Act provided seed funding for women's business centers through an annual grant process by the Small Business Administration. They were intended to provide technical assistance to women in order to form businesses, particularly those who were socially or economically disadvantaged. Women's business centers provide training, technical assistance, and support for entrepreneurship for women. The Global Entrepreneurship Monitor research project has consistently shown that women have lower entrepreneurship endeavors than men, but research on women's business centers indicate that the centers in the United States are accomplishing their intended mission.

Women lack equal access to education, finance, and other support services, such as business networks. Women often also have to pay higher interest rates than men for similar loans. In addition to these logistical factors, women are often influenced by societal norms, such as being unlikely to be exposed to the concept of negotiation. The lack of resources for women entrepreneurs in daily assistance in the beginning stages of their businesses make it difficult for women to start businesses. As a result, women entrepreneurs are more likely than men to stay in business for only short periods of time. Women’s Business Centers seek to offer assistance with the day-to-day operations of starting a business, hoping to help women overcome the barriers they face to entrepreneurship.

Since 1995, the Center for Women in Business Enterprise in Boston and Worcester have helped over 14,000 entrepreneurs. This is indicative of the demand for such services. Women's Business Center Program has had significant economic impact, with more than one half of the Centers showing growth in number of clients helped, gross receipts, profits, the creation of jobs, and new firms started.

=== National Women's Business Council ===
Created by the Women's Business Ownership Act, the National Women's Business Council is a non-partisan federal advisory board created to present policy advice about women small business issues to the President and Congress. It has resulted in the Census Bureau being required to include women business owners in its census survey.

Established in 1988, it started as an advisory board intended to identify the barriers for women-owned businesses and report annually to the president and Congress. By the early 1990s, the National Women's Business Council included women business owners, policy makers, bankers, and representatives of women's business organizations in the discussion of potential solutions to the problems women-owned businesses face, which were then presented to the president and Congress. The Small Business Reauthorization Act changed the structure of the National Women's Business Council in 1994 to its current form, which includes women business owners and representatives of women's business organizations. The law was expanded in 1998 for the National Women's Business council to include the current fifteen members.

The members of the National Women's Business Council are appointed to three year terms. The fifteen members include:

- a chair appointed by the president
- eight women business owners or chief executives (four in the same political party as the US president and four not)
- six representatives of national women's business organizations
  - Association of Women's Business Centers
  - Astia
  - National Association of Women Business Owners (NAWBO)
  - Women's Business Enterprise National Council
  - Women Impacting Public Policy (WIPP)
  - Women Presidents' Organizations (WPO)

== Race and the Women's Business Ownership Act ==
White women working on the legislation for the Women’s Business Ownership Act were concerned that adding amendments for women of color would make the bill too controversial to pass or “putting race and sex together in the same legislation complicates the issue and might threaten the passage of the legislation.” This concern indicates the marginalization that women face, but also the additional barriers for women of color.

The National Association of Women Business Owners (NAWBO) was a main proponent for the passing of the bill. NAWBO argued that stereotypes of women created barriers to women business owners. However, NAWBO was hesitant to include women of color to its ranks. They were nervous that, due to the political climate of the time, adding a racial component to what was already considered progressive legislation intended to address women’s issues would provoke push back from conservatives. The coalition eventually was convinced that it was important to include women of color because their interests could be addressed by NAWBO without also involving the community of minority men business owners. A small sub-coalition was created, which consisted of the Organization of Pan Asian American Women, the Black Women’s Agenda, and the Coalition of Minority Women in Business.

Processes that are racialized and affect entrepreneurship are often gendered and classed as well. Residential segregation, racialized social networks, and wealth inequality influence blacks’ entrepreneurial behavior by reducing their access to resources necessary to start businesses. These aspects are also influenced by gender and class. As of 2015, only about 5% of CEOs of Fortune 500 companies are women, and the majority are white. On average for full-time work, a white man will earn almost 56% more than a black woman. Black entrepreneurs understand their business ownership within a context of race, but also within the context of other social groups, like gender.

== Socioeconomic Status and the Women's Business Ownership Act ==
Initially, women’s interest groups were accused of representing only middle- and upper-middle-class women when selecting issues to politically address. However, the interests of working class and poor women have received increased attention. Measures implemented by the Women’s Business Ownership Act, such as the Women's Business Centers, were intentionally implemented for women of lower socioeconomic status.

== Affirmative Action for Women ==
Affirmative action programs are often used as a way to make the playing field equal for minority and women owned businesses, and can contribute to the ability for business entry and survival. These programs for women can be considered in terms of education, employment, and business ownership. For women business owners, affirmative action programs are considered legislation that encourage government agencies and contractors to do business with women-owned businesses. Programs that provide financial, management, and technical assistance to women business owners are also considered to be aspects of affirmative action. Affirmative action legislation has led to substantial improvements in the employment of minorities and women. While affirmative action independently is not enough to provide opportunities to those facing discrimination or marginalization, evidence suggests that it is beneficial in helping women and minorities to attain more education or economic gains. Ronald Reagan's administration from 1981 to 1989, or during the passage of the Women's Business Ownership Act, was adamantly opposed to affirmative action. There was a concern that the heavy opposition undermined the effectiveness of the policies.

Research conducted after the abolition of affirmative action in Washington and California found evidence to suggest there were slight increases in self-employment among minorities and women with no affirmative action. This is believed to be due to the opportunity cost of starting a business falling because of the restricting opportunities in a traditional labor market. However, this may not be true when considering different race and gender groups.
