= Gavia Severa =

Ancient Roman businesswoman and perfumer

Gavia Severa (fl. 1st century AD), was an Ancient Roman businesswoman in Pompeii. She was a producer and merchant of perfume.

== Life and career ==
Gavia Severa both manufactured and sold her own perfume in Pompeii. As such, she is referred to under the professional title unguentaria. Six amphorae containing ingredients used for the manufacture of perfume have been found with her name in House VII.7.5 in Pompeii.
