= Faustilla (moneylender) =

Ancient Roman businesswoman from Pompeii

Faustilla (fl. 1st century AD), was an Ancient Roman businesswoman in Pompeii.

== Life and career ==
Faustilla was active as a businesswoman in Pompeii. She appears to have been in the business of pawnbroker and moneylender or banker. She is mentioned in several inscriptions around Pompeii as the moneylender of both male and female clients around the city, describing her business transactions.

One inscription translates to:

"July 15th. Earring left with Faustilla as collateral. For a loan of two denarii [= 32 asses] she took as interest one bronze as from the sum of 30 [?32] [asses]. (CIL 4.8203)"

Another translates to:

"This or a different Faustilla also took a loan, apparently in a bar, for this was scribbled on the wall: November. From Faustilla, 8 asses in interest for 15 denarii. (CIL 4. 4528)"

Faustilla has sometimes been theorized to have been more than one businesswoman of the same name, but this is not confirmed.

She belonged to the group of women in Pompeii who is often referred to when it comes to Ancient Roman businesswomen. Pompeii is unusually well documented for a Roman city, and gives a valuable source of information about the professional opportunities of Ancient Roman women.
