= Gertrud Morneweg =

Businesswoman and banker

Gertrud Morneweg (died 1301) was a businesswoman and banker in Lübeck in the 13th-century.

She was married to the merchant Bertram Morneweg (d. 1286) and was the mother of Hermann Morneweg, one of the wealthiest men in Lübeck and mayor of the city in 1312. After the death of her spouse, she took over his business and fortune of 13,500 Lübeck Marks. She managed a large scale banking enterprise and lent the city of Lübeck great funds, out-competing her rivals with her low interest rate of 6.25 percent. She died in Lübeck in 1301 and left a great fortune behind her.

== Legacy ==
The Hanseatic City of Lübeck honors Gertrud Morneweg as part of a traveling exhibition about women in Lübeck's history.
