= Ama-e =

Ancient Sumerian businesswoman

- Years active: c. 2330 BC
- Spouse: Ur-Sara

Ama-e (Sumerian: 𒂼𒂍/ ama-e2 or ama-é; fl. c. 2330 BC) was an Ancient Sumerian businesswoman. She is one of the earliest individual businesswomen of which any significant amount of information is known.

== Background ==
She lived in the city of Umma during the reign of Sargon of Akkad. She was married to Ur-Šara and her business transactions are well documented in the so-called Ur-Sara family archive. While it does not appear to have been uncommon for women to conduct business, as it was regarded as a part of the household duties, no other individual businesswoman and her transactions from this period or before is as well documented as Ama-e.

== Business ==
She rented land from the crown for cultivating, invested in buildings, traded in barley and metal, and had a network of business agents through which she bought and sold silver, wood, wool, food and perfume.

Translator H. J. Marsman wrote:

In early Mesopotamian society, women appear to have acted quite independently [and] could stand surely for someone else [as with] the businesswoman Ama-e, who lived in Sargonic Umma. She engaged in trade involving grain, wool, and metals.

Family business records show that she invested some of the profits in real estate and building projects and oversaw a widespread trade network.

== See also ==
- Ahaha
- Ninšatapada
