= Naevoleia Tyche =

Ancient Roman businesswoman from Pompeii

Naevoleia Tyche (fl. 1st century AD), was an Ancient Roman businesswoman in Pompeii.

== Life and career ==
Naevoleia Tyche was a former slave and a freedwoman. After her manumission, she became active within trade. She appears to have become a successful and wealthy businesswoman. She appears to have invested in the seafaring trade. She became wealthy enough to commission an impressive funeral monument over herself and her husband Caius Munatius Faustus, who was also a former slave, which has attracted a lot of attention.

The monument was erected at the Porta Ercolano:

NAEVOLEIA L(UCI) LIB(ERTA) TYCHE SIBI ET C(AIO) MUNATIO
FAUSTO AUG(USTALIS) ET PAGANO GUI DECURIONES CONSENSU
POPULI BISELLIUM OB MERITA EIUS DECREVERUNT. HOC MONI-
MENTUM NAEVOLEIA TYCHE LIBERTIS SUIS LIBERTABUSQUE ET C(AI)
MUNATI FAUSTI VIVA FECIT.

The text translates to:

Naevoleia Tyche, freedwoman of Lucius, for herself and Gauis Munatius Faustus, an augustalis and suburban magistrate, to whom because of his merit the decuriones with consent of the people voted a bisellium. Naevoleia Tyche built this monument, while she was still living, for her freedmen and freedwomen and those of Gains Munatius Faustus.

Her monument depicts a large woman who is possibly a portrait of herself. It also depicts ships, which could describe her activity within trade.

She belonged to the group of women in Pompeii who is often referred to when it comes to Ancient Roman businesswomen. Pompeii is unusually well documented for a Roman city, and gives a valuable source of information about the professional opportunities of Ancient Roman women.
