= Vibia (vine merchant) =

Ancient Roman businesswoman from Pompeii

Vibia (fl. 1st century AD), was an Ancient Roman businesswoman in Pompeii.

== Life and career ==
The (CIL IV 5792) inscription notes that Vibia sold the wine produced by the wine producer Caesia Helpis.

The exact nature of the business relationship between Vibia and Caesia Helpis has been an issue of many different theories. The HALLEX |OPTIMA | VIBIAE (CIL IV 9411) appears to describe her as the owner of a shop which sold the wine produced by Caesia Helpis. She is also suggested to have produced and sold fish sauce, garum. Her social status has been subject of speculation. She may have been a freedwoman: the production and selling of garum was a typical profession of a former slave.

She belonged to the group of women in Pompeii who is often referred to when it comes to Ancient Roman businesswomen. Pompeii is unusually well documented for a Roman city, and gives a valuable source of information about the professional opportunities of Ancient Roman women.
