= National Association of Women Business Owners =

American female entrepreneurship organization

- Abbreviation: NAWBO
- Founded: July 7, 1975
- Founded at: Washington, D.C.
- Type: Professional association
- Purpose: Advocacy and support for women business owners
- Headquarters: Washington, D.C.
- Region served: United States
- Official language: English
- CEO: Jen Earle
- Website: nawbo.org

The National Association of Women Business Owners (NAWBO) is an American business organisation founded in Washington, D.C. in 1975. NAWBO represents more than 14 million women-owned businesses across the United States and develops programs for women entrepreneurs in the various stages of business growth.

The NAWBO Institute, a 501(c)3 non-profit educational foundation.

== History ==
NAWBO began as a small group of Washington, D.C. businesswomen who started meeting in 1974. They incorporated as NAWBO on December 19, 1974, recruited their first members in 1976, and formed their first national chapters in 1978. Today it is a dues-based national organization representing the interests of women entrepreneurs across all industries.

- Helping pass legislation like H.R. 5050, which granted women business owners the right to obtain business credit in their own name and led to the creation of the Women’s Business Centers and National Women’s Business Council.

== International ==
NAWBO serves as the United States representative in Les Femmes Chefs d'Entreprises Mondiales (FCEM), the World Association of Women Entrepreneurs, which has chapters in dozens of countries representing almost 30,000 businesses.

NAWBO is also affiliated with the National Foundation for Women Business Owners (NFWBO), a nonprofit research and leadership development foundation established by NAWBO that gathers information about women-owned businesses and makes it available to organizations around the globe. Additionally, NAWBO is affiliated with the Women Business Owners Corporation (WBOC), which helps small women-owned businesses compete for government contracts and meet professional certification and training needs.

== Awards ==
NAWBO's annual Woman Business Owner of the Year Award recognizes a NAWBO entrepreneur who excels at strategy, operations, finances, problem solving, innovating, overcoming adversity and giving back to her community. This honor is not based on the size of business, but rather on overall business and community excellence.

The Susan Hager Award recognizes a “champion” NAWBO member who has demonstrated an ongoing commitment to propelling women’s economic empowerment and NAWBO’s mission locally and nationally.

The Gillian Rudd Award honors a NAWBO woman business owner who has made a significant contribution to the status and visibility of women-owned firms.
