= Antoinette Nording =

Swedish entrepreneur and perfumer

- Born: Antoinette Wilhelmina Fahlcrantz; 1814; Stockholm, Sweden
- Died: 1887 (aged 72–73)
- Occupation(s): Entrepreneur, perfumer
- Known for: Founder of Antoinette W Nording; first female perfumer in Sweden
- Spouse: Johan Christian Nording (m. 1838; died 1883)

Antoinette Wilhelmina Nording (1814-1887), was a Swedish entrepreneur. She founded the famous perfume company Antoinette W Nording, for a time the biggest perfume company in Sweden, in 1847. She can be regarded as the first female perfumer in Sweden, and as a female pioneer.

== Life ==
Antoinette Nording was born to spice merchant Anders Fahlcrantz (1757-1823) and Brita Christina Bäckmanin in Stockholm and in 1838 married the spice merchant Johan Christian Nording (1807-1883). In 1846, the monopoly of the guilds were abolished in Sweden, and the following year, Antoinette Nording applied for a permit to manufacture and sell Eau de Cologne.

Nording was granted her permit to manufacture and sell perfume in 1847. While a married woman was legally a minor under the guardianship of her spouse, she could engage in business with the permit of her spouse in accordance with the Handelsordningen. Until the Fabriks och Handtwerksordning reform of 1846, perfume manufacture in Sweden had officially been the privilege of the Apothecary guild, which made Nording a pioneer as the perhaps first perfumer in the modern sense in Sweden. Female apothecaries (normally widows of apothecaries who inherited the privilege of their husbands) had with all certainty manufactured perfumes before, but there are no woman confirmed to have manufactured cosmetics in Sweden before Eva Ekeblad, and no woman confirmed to have done so for commercial purposes until Nording, making her a pioneer also as the first female perfumer in Sweden, though she was quickly given competition: already in 1858, there were five perfumers only in Stockholm, only counting the female ones.

Antoinette Nording became a successful business person. She manufactured as well as imported four kinds of Eau de Cologne, French liquor, French and English soap, pomades, powders, theater make up and a number of cosmetic products for "the sophisticated toilette", and imported essences from England and Provence. She had an exclusive clientele, and her products were popular as Christmas gifts.

== Legacy ==
Nording had no children, and after the death of her spouse in 1883, she retired. She sold her company to Christina Charlotta Pettersson (1850-1932), her employee since a decade, in exchange for a pension from the company. She also made Pettersson her heir. Pettersson and her spouse (who took the name Nording) managed the company with continuing success and left it to their daughter Ida Maria "Maja" Charlotta Nording (1885-1979). It had thereby been managed by women for three generations.

== Sources ==
- Du Rietz, Anita, Kvinnors entreprenörskap: under 400 år, 1. uppl., Dialogos, Stockholm, 2013
