= Ahaha =

First businesswoman in history

Ahaha (fl. c. 1850 BCE) was an ancient Assyrian investor and one of the earliest documented businesswomen in history. She is known for falling victim to financial fraud and pleading to her brother to retrieve stolen silver for her. It is unknown if her pleas were answered.

== History ==
Ahaha lived during the Old Assyrian period and grew up in Assur. Her mother, Lamassī, raised Ahaha while her father was primarily stationed in Kanesh engaging in business affairs. During this time, it was customary for women to head the household and make financial decisions while their husbands traveled extensively as merchants. Women operated joint-stock companies and dealt with loans, real estate, and market trends. Assyrians made money facilitating trades between Babylon (and other foreign lands) and Kanesh, traveling in long-distance caravans funded by investors, who earned profits such as gold and silver when trades were successful. Following the death of her mother, Ahaha took control of the paternal estate.

== Investments ==
As a businesswoman, Ahaha made investments in various joint-stock companies, including one managed by her father's partner, Pazzur-Aššur. One of Ahaha's brothers, Buzāzu, also invested in the same joint-stock company and was tasked with managing his sister's share. However, Buzāzu exploited this responsibility by withdrawing her funds for his own business. In a financial venture common in the Old Assyrian period, Ahaha invested in a donkey caravan that was set to carry out a long-distance trade between Assur and Kanesh. When the caravan returned, Ahaha was promised a share of the profits in silver. However, Ahaha concluded that she had been defrauded when no silver was actually returned to her.

== Fraud recovery letter ==
Cuneiform tablets excavated at Kanesh reveal that Ahaha suspected the fraudster was her own brother, Buzāzu. In a clay tablet written to her other brother, Ahaha begged for help:

I have nothing else apart from these funds... Take care to act so that I will not be ruined!... Let a detailed letter from you come to me by the very next caravan, saying if they do pay the silver... Now is the time to do me a favour and to save me from financial stress!

The letter highlights the urgency of the retrieval of her stolen silver and her request for a notice upon retrieval.

== See also ==
- Ama-e
- Ea-nāṣir
- Complaint tablet to Ea-nāṣir
- Ninšatapada
