= Caesia Helpis =

Ancient Roman businesswoman from Pompeii

Caesia Helpis (fl. 1st century AD), was an Ancient Roman businesswoman in Pompeii.

== Life and career ==
Caesia Helpis was a member of a family in Pompeii known as the manufacturers of the wine Vinum Caesianum, which was known during the reign of emperor Nero. It is not confirmed whether her name indicates that she was in fact a member of the family, or if she was a former slave manumitted by the family and their client.

She is noted in the inscriptions CIL IV, 5789–91, 5793 as an independent businesswoman who produced and sold wine. In Pompeii, many women sold wine, but it appears to have been rare to manufacture it. She sold her wine through the wine trader-businesswoman Vibia.

Her name has been found in several inscriptions as well as amphorae with the name Caesia. She is theorized to have also traded in fish sauce, garum. It appears as she and M. Acceius Telemachus were members of a guild or a society for people who manufactured fish sauce.

She belonged to the group of women in Pompeii who is often referred to when it comes to Ancient Roman businesswomen. Pompeii is unusually well documented for a Roman city, and gives a valuable source of information about the professional opportunities of Ancient Roman women.
