= Women in ancient Rome =

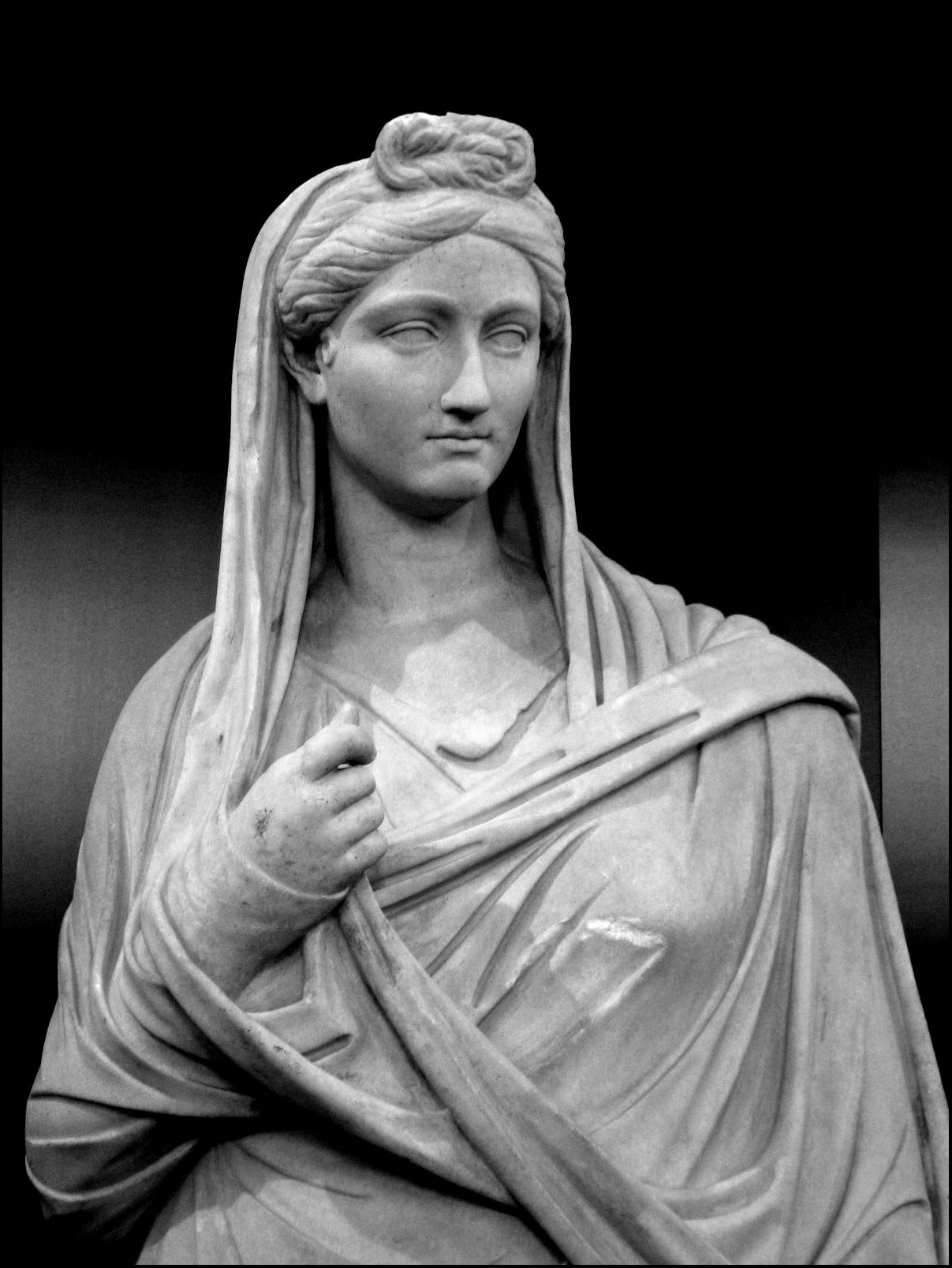
The educated and well-traveled Vibia Sabina (c. 136 AD) was a grand-niece of the emperor Trajan and became the wife of his successor Hadrian.

In ancient Rome, freeborn women were citizens (cives), but could not vote or hold political office. Because of their limited public role, women are named less frequently than men by Roman historians. But while Roman women held no direct political power, those from wealthy or powerful families could and did exert influence through private negotiations. Exceptional women who left an undeniable mark on history include Lucretia and Quinta Claudia, whose stories took on mythic significance; fierce Republican-era women such as Cornelia, mother of the Gracchi, and Fulvia, who commanded an army and issued coins bearing her image; women of the Julio-Claudian dynasty, most prominently Livia (58 BC – AD 29) and Agrippina the Younger (15–59 AD), who contributed to the formation of Imperial mores; and the empress Helena (c.250–330 AD), a driving force in promoting Christianity.

As is the case with male members of society, elite women and their politically significant deeds eclipse those of lower status in the historical record. Inscriptions and especially epitaphs document the names of a wide range of women throughout the Roman Empire, but often tell little else about them. Some vivid snapshots of daily life are preserved in Latin literary genres such as comedy, satire, and poetry, particularly the poems of Catullus and Ovid, which offer glimpses of women in Roman dining rooms and boudoirs, at sporting and theatrical events, shopping, putting on makeup, practicing magic, worrying about pregnancy—all, however, through male eyes. The published letters of Cicero, for instance, reveal informally how the self-proclaimed great man interacted on the domestic front with his wife Terentia and daughter Tullia, as his speeches demonstrate through disparagement the various ways Roman women could enjoy a free-spirited sexual and social life.

The one major public role reserved solely for women was in the sphere of religion: the priestly office of the Vestals. Forbidden from marriage or sex for a period of thirty years, the Vestals devoted themselves to the study and correct observance of rituals which were deemed necessary for the security and survival of Rome but which could not be performed by the male colleges of priests.

== Childhood and education ==
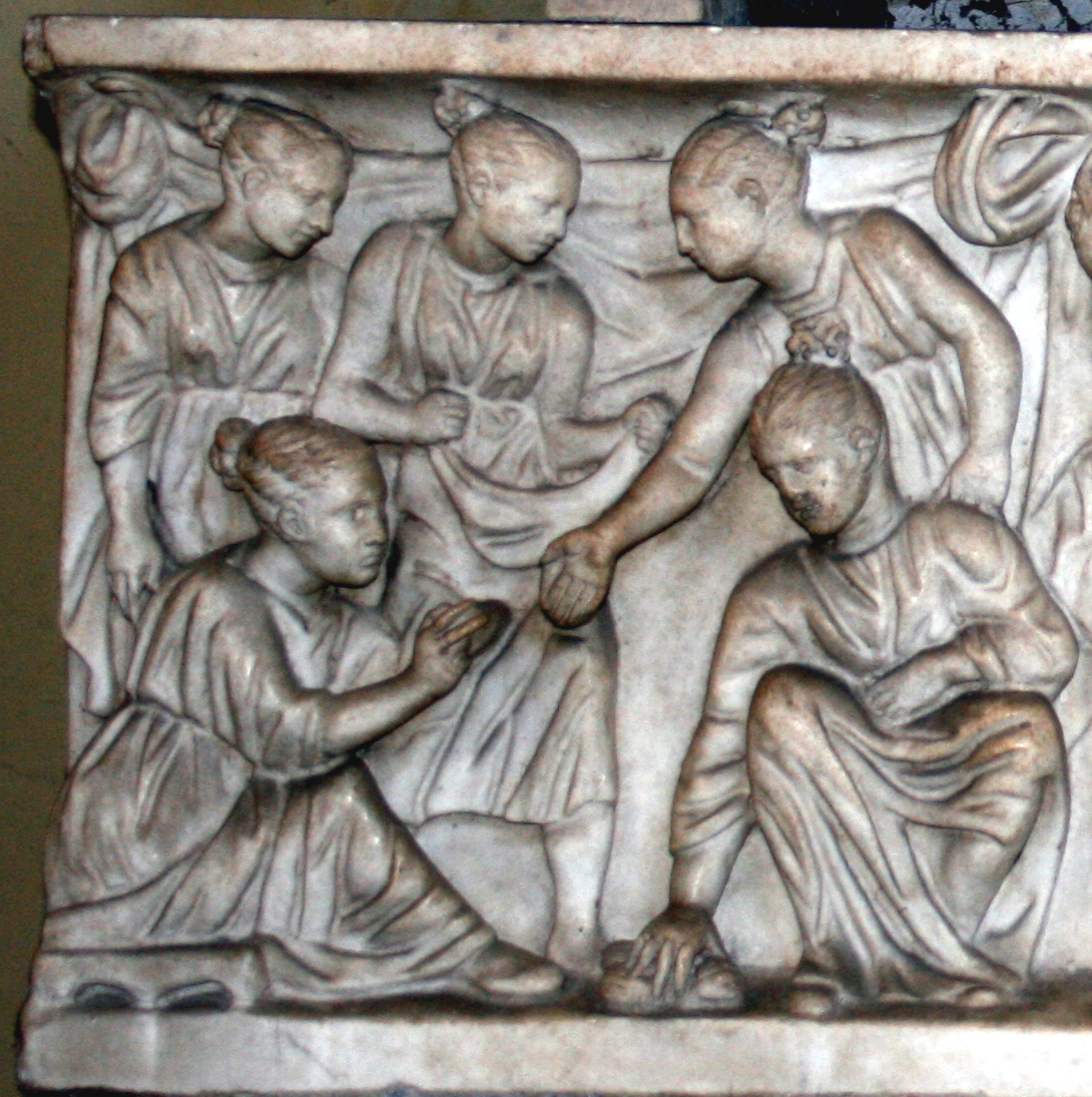
Roman girls playing a game

Childhood and upbringing in ancient Rome were determined by social status. Roman children played a number of games, and their toys are known from archaeology and literary sources. Animal figures were popular, and some children kept live animals and birds as pets. In Roman art girls are shown playing many of the same games as boys, such as ball, hoop-rolling, and knucklebones. Dolls are sometimes found in the tombs of those who died before adulthood. The figures are typically 15–16 cm (5.9–6.3 in) tall, with jointed limbs, and made of materials such as wood, terracotta, and especially bone and ivory. In Ancient Rome, the death of children before reaching aduthood was a common experience due to exceptionally high mortality rates. Most children did not survive past their first birthday, and half of those born died before the age of ten from common illnesses such as measles and dysentery. Girls coming of age dedicated their dolls to Diana, the goddess most concerned with girlhood, or to Venus when they were preparing for marriage. Noble girls were known to marry as young as 12 years of age, whereas females in the lower classes were more likely to marry slightly further into their teenage years. (Boys, however, had to be at least 14.) An example of the marriage age of noble females can be seen with Cicero's lifelong friend Atticus, who married his daughter Caecilia Attica to Marcus Vipsanius Agrippa when she was 14.

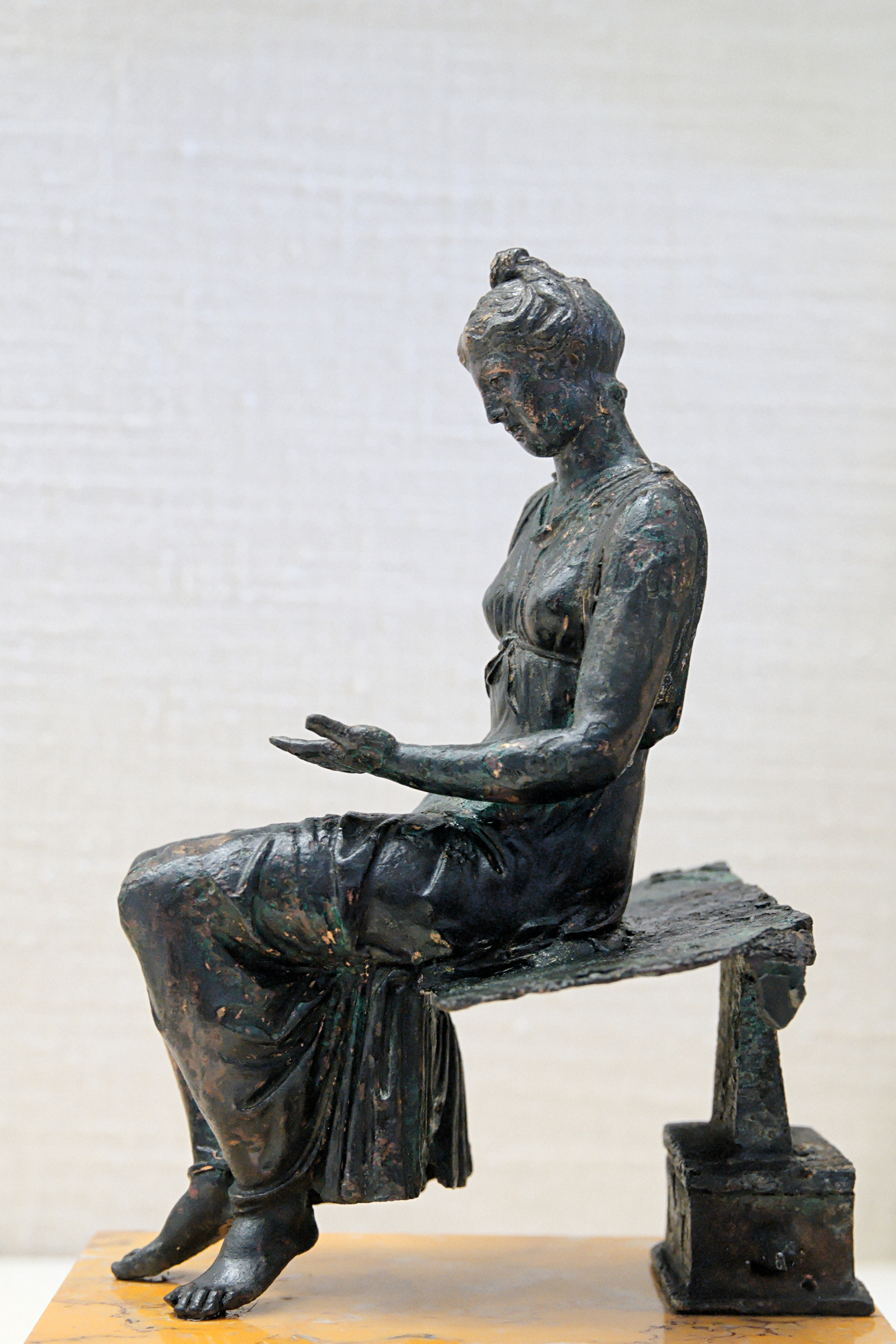
Bronze statuette of the 1st century depicting a girl reading

Girls were expected to safeguard their chastity, modesty, and reputation, in preparation for eventual marriage. The light regulation of marriage by the law with regards to minimum age (12) and consent to marriage was designed to leave families, primarily fathers, with much freedom to propel girls into marriage whenever and with whomever they saw fit. Marriage facilitated a partnership between the father and prospective husbands, and enabled the formation of a mutually beneficial alliance with both political and economic incentives at heart. The girls would leave their own families and join their husbands. The social regime, geared towards early marriage and implemented through children's education and upbringing, was particularly restrictive for girls. Some, perhaps many, girls went to a public primary school; however, there is some evidence to suggest that girls’ education was limited to this elementary school level. It has been inferred that individual school tutoring of girls at home was led by concerns about threats to girls’ modesty in coeducational classrooms. Ovid and Martial imply that boys and girls were educated either together or similarly, and Livy takes it for granted that the daughter of a centurion would be in school. Alternatively, Epictetus and other historians and philosophers suggest that the educational system was preoccupied with the development of masculine virtue, with male teenagers performing school exercises in public speaking about Roman values.

Children of both sexes learned to behave socially by attending dinner parties or other, less elitist events. Both genders participated in religious festivals; for example, at the Secular Games of 17 BC, the Carmen Saeculare was sung by a choir of girls and boys. Children were made into virtuous adults through scholastic means, with curriculum, language, literature, and philosophy teaching moral precepts. Children of the elite were taught Greek as well as Latin from an early age. Among the upper classes, women seem to have been well-educated, some highly so, and were sometimes praised by the male historians for their learning and cultivation. Some women became socially prominent, and even relatively independent. Cornelia Metella, the young wife of Pompey the Great at the time of his death, was distinguished for her musicianship and her knowledge of geometry, literature, and philosophy. This degree of learning indicates formal preparation; however, among the lower classes education was limited and strongly geared towards the course of marriage, and performing the tasks of the female within the household. Elite families poured money into their daughters' literary and virtue training to equip them with skills that would appeal to prospective husbands. Epictetus suggests that at the age of 14 girls were considered to be on the brink of womanhood and beginning to understand the inevitability of their future role as wives. They learned modesty through explicit instruction and upbringing.

The lives of boys and girls began to diverge dramatically after they formally came of age, and memorials to women recognize their domestic qualities far more often than intellectual achievements. The skills a Roman matron needed to run a household required training, and mothers probably passed on their knowledge to their daughters in a manner appropriate to their station in life, given the emphasis in Roman society on traditionalism. Virginity and sexual purity were culturally valued qualities considered vital for the stability of both family and state. The rape of an unmarried girl posed a threat to her reputation and marriageability, and the penalty of death was sometimes imposed on the unchaste daughter. The Emperor Augustus introduced marriage legislation, the Lex Papia Poppaea, which rewarded marriage and childbearing. The legislation also imposed penalties on young persons who failed to marry and on those who committed adultery. Therefore, marriage and childbearing was made law between the ages of twenty-five and sixty for men, and twenty and fifty for women.

== Women in the family and law ==
=== Always a Daughter ===
Both daughters and sons were subject to patria potestas, the power wielded by their father as head of household (familia). A Roman household was considered a collective (corpus, a "body") over which the pater familias had mastery (dominium). Slaves, who had no legal standing, were part of the household as property. In the early Empire, the legal standing of daughters differed little if at all from that of sons. If the father died without a will, the right of a daughter to share in the family property was equal to that of a son, though legislation in the 2nd century BCE had attempted to limit this right. Even apart from legal status, daughters seem no less esteemed within the Roman family than sons, though sons were expected to ensure family standing by following their fathers into public life.

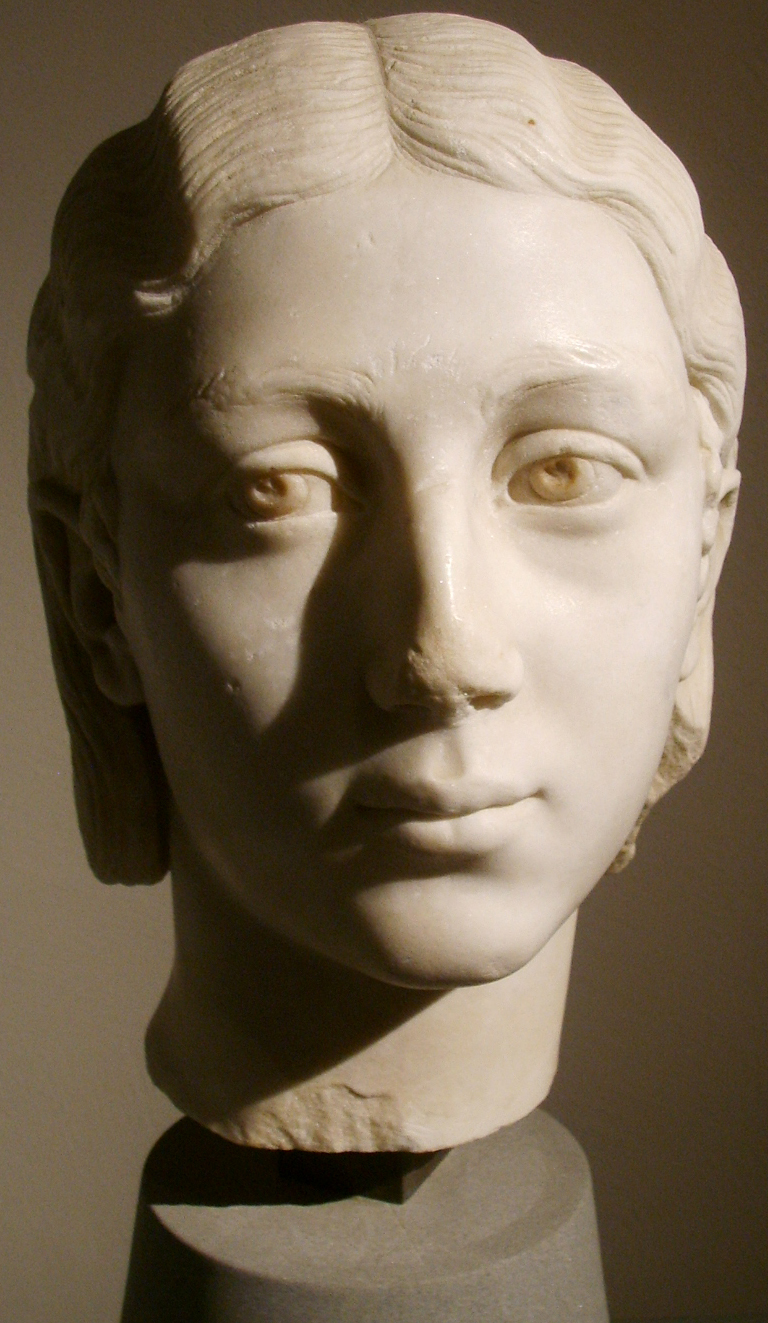
Bust of a Roman girl, early 3rd century

The pater familias had the right and duty to find a husband for his daughter, and first marriages were normally arranged. Technically, the couple had to be old enough to consent, but the age of consent was 12 for girls and 14 for boys. However, in practice boys seem to have been on average five years older. Among the elite, 14 was the age of transition from childhood to adolescence, but a betrothal might be arranged for political reasons when the couple were too young to marry. In general, noble women married younger than women of the lower classes. Most Roman women would have married in their late teens to early twenties. An aristocratic girl was expected to be a virgin when she married, as her young age might indicate. A daughter could legitimately refuse a match made by her parents only by showing that the proposed husband was of bad character.

In the early Republic, the bride became subject to her husband's potestas, but to a lesser degree than their children. By the early Empire, however, a daughter's legal relationship to her father remained unchanged when she married, even though she moved into her husband's home. This arrangement was one of the factors in the degree of independence Roman women enjoyed relative to those of many other ancient cultures and up to the early modern period. Although a Roman woman had to answer to her father legally, she did not conduct her daily life under his direct scrutiny, and her husband had no legal power over her.

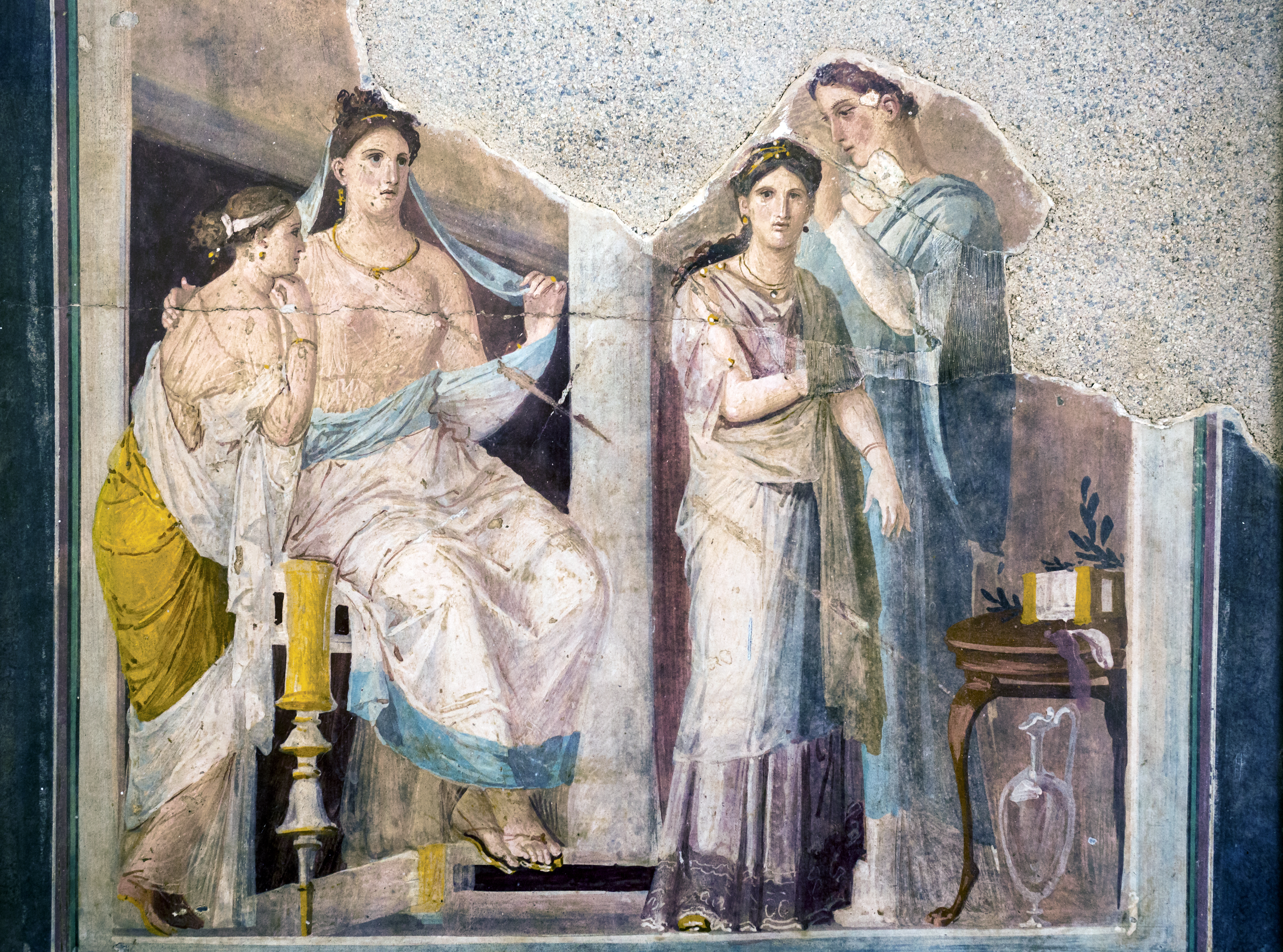
Dressing of a priestess or bride, Roman fresco from Herculaneum, Italy (1–79 AD)

A daughter was expected to be deferential toward her father and to remain loyal to him, even if it meant having to disagree with her husband's actions. For some, "deference" was not always absolute. After arranging his daughter's first two marriages, Cicero disapproved—rightly, as it turned out—of her choice to marry the unreliable Dolabella, but found himself unable to prevent it.

A daughter kept her own family name (nomen) for life, not assuming that of her husband. This custom is still prevalent in many countries that belonged to the Roman Empire, such as Spain or Italy. Children usually took the father's name. In the Imperial period, however, children might sometimes make their mother's family name part of theirs, or even adopt it instead.

== Women and sexuality ==
From the start of the Roman Republic, there was a high emphasis placed on a woman's virginity. Pudicitia (chastity) was a goddess of feminine purity, and was worshipped by Roman women. Only those who were virgins were allowed to enter the temple. A woman's sexual life began with the consummation of her marriage in her husband's cubiculum (private room), where slaves did not enter. In Roman houses, it was common for men and women to each have their own cubicula, allowing the potential for them to carry on separate sex lives. While it was expected that women should only have sexual relations with their husbands, it was common for a man to have many sexual partners throughout his life. After marriage, women were scrutinized in the household to prevent any adulterous behavior. For example, Julius Caesar's second wife, Pompeia, attempted to have private relations with Publius Clodius. Julius Caesar's mother, Aurelia, who monitored Pompeia's actions, prevented their private meetings. The mere possibility of Pompeia committing adultery caused Caesar to divorce her.

=== Augustus's campaign on women and the family ===
The focus on a woman's purity and on her role as a faithful wife and dutiful mother in the family increased during the reign of Augustus. This general campaign to alter family dynamics began in 18–17 BC. Augustus' new laws targeted both men and women between the ages of 20 and 55, who were rewarded for being in what were considered healthy relationships, and punished if unmarried or childless. Additionally, Augustus enforced the divorce and punishment of adulterous wives. Women under his rule could be punished in the courts for adultery and banished. A woman's private relationships now became a publicly regulated matter. The palace was secured and driven by the idea that women would be returned to their proper places as chaste wives and mothers, and thus household order would be restored. Augustus went so far as to punish and exile his own daughter, Julia, for engaging in extramarital affairs.

=== Women and the law ===
There never was a case in court in which the quarrel was not started by a woman. If Manilia is not a defendant, she'll be the plaintiff; she will herself frame and adjust the pleadings; she will be ready to instruct Celsus himself how to open his case, and how to urge his points.

— Juvenal, Satire VI

Although the rights and status of women in the earliest period of Roman history were more restricted than in the late Republic and Empire, as early as the 5th century BC, Roman women could own land, write their own wills, and appear in court. The historian Valerius Maximus devotes a section of his work On Memorable Deeds and Speeches to women who conducted cases on their own behalf, or on behalf of others. These women got to show their ability as orators in the courtroom at a time when oratory was considered a defining pursuit of the most ambitious Roman men. One of these, Maesia Sentinas, is identified by her origin in the town of Sentinum, and not, as was customary, by her relation to a man. The independent Maesia spoke in her own defense, and was acquitted almost unanimously after only a short trial because she spoke with such strength and effectiveness. Since these characteristics were considered masculine, however, the historian opined that under her feminine appearance, she had a "virile spirit", and thereafter she was called "the Androgyne".

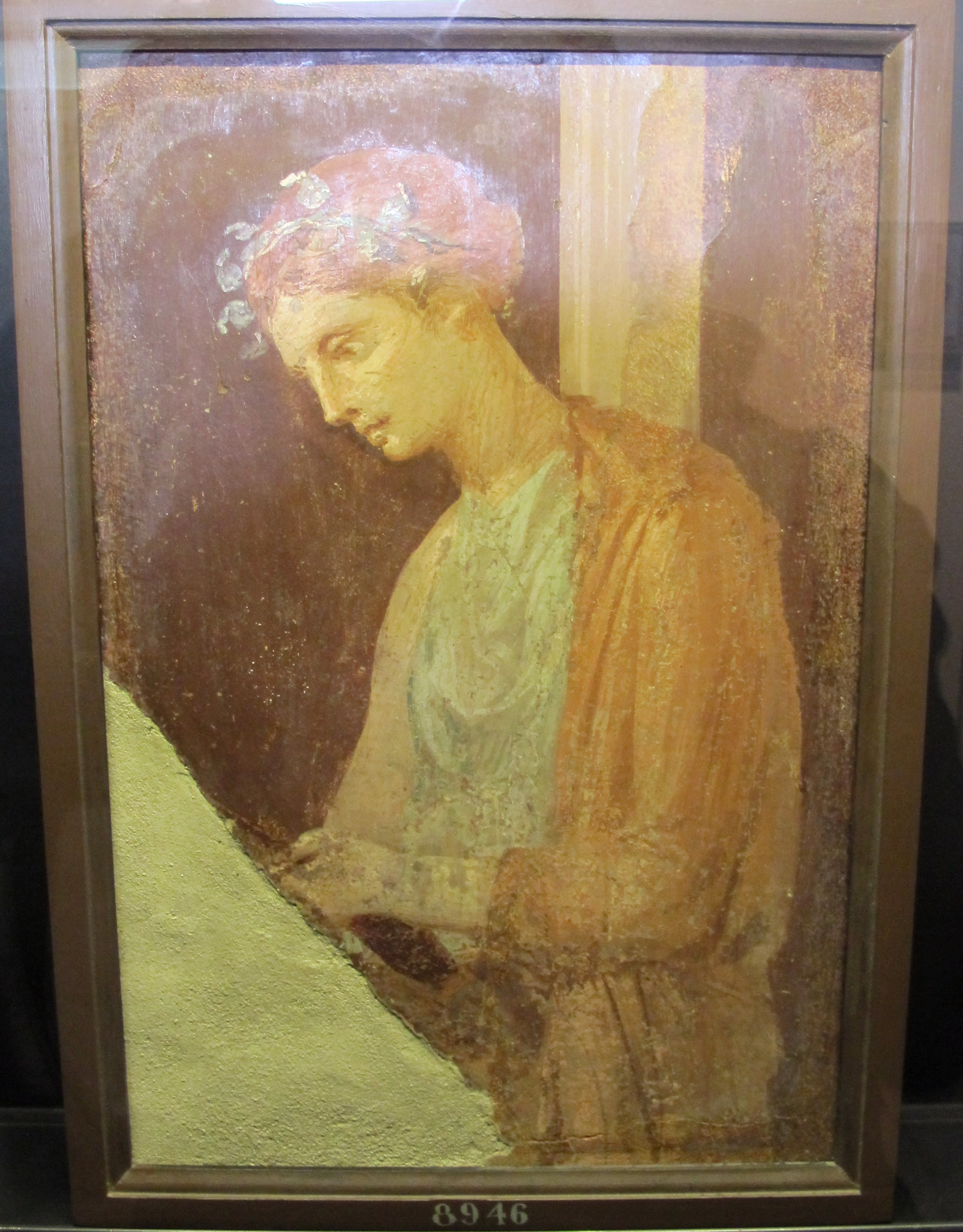
Roman fresco of a maiden reading a text, Pompeian Fourth Style (60–79 AD), Pompeii, Italy

Maesia's ability to present a case "methodically and vigorously" suggests that while women did not plead regularly in open court, they had experience in private declamation and family court. Afrania, the wife of a senator during the time of Sulla, appeared so frequently before the praetor who presided over the court, even though she had male advocates who could have spoken for her, that she was accused of calumnia, malicious prosecution. An edict was consequently enacted that prohibited women from bringing claims on behalf of others, on the grounds that it jeopardized their pudicitia, the modesty appropriate to one's station. It has been noted that while women were often impugned for their feeblemindedness and ignorance of the law, and thus in need of protection by male advocates, in reality actions were taken to restrict their influence and effectiveness. Despite this specific restriction, there are numerous examples of women taking informed actions in legal matters in the Late Republic and Principate, including dictating legal strategy to their advocate behind the scenes.

An emancipated woman legally became sui iuris, or her own person, and could own property and dispose of it as she saw fit. If a pater familias died intestate, the law required the equal division of his estate amongst his children, regardless of their age and sex. A will that did otherwise, or emancipated any family member without due process of law, could be challenged. From the late Republic onward, a woman who inherited a share equal with her brothers would have been independent of agnatic control.

As in the case of minors, an emancipated woman had a legal guardian (tutor) appointed to her. She retained her powers of administration, however, and the guardian's main if not sole purpose was to give formal consent to actions. The guardian had no say in her private life, and a woman sui iuris could marry as she pleased. A woman also had certain avenues of recourse if she wished to replace an obstructive tutor. Under Augustus, a woman who had gained the ius liberorum, the legal right to certain privileges after bearing three children, was also released from guardianship, and the emperor Claudius banned agnatic guardianship. The role of guardianship as a legal institution gradually diminished, and by the 2nd century CE the jurist Gaius said he saw no reason for it. The Christianization of the Empire, beginning with the conversion of the Emperor Constantine in the early 4th century, eventually had consequences for the legal status of women.

=== Marriage ===
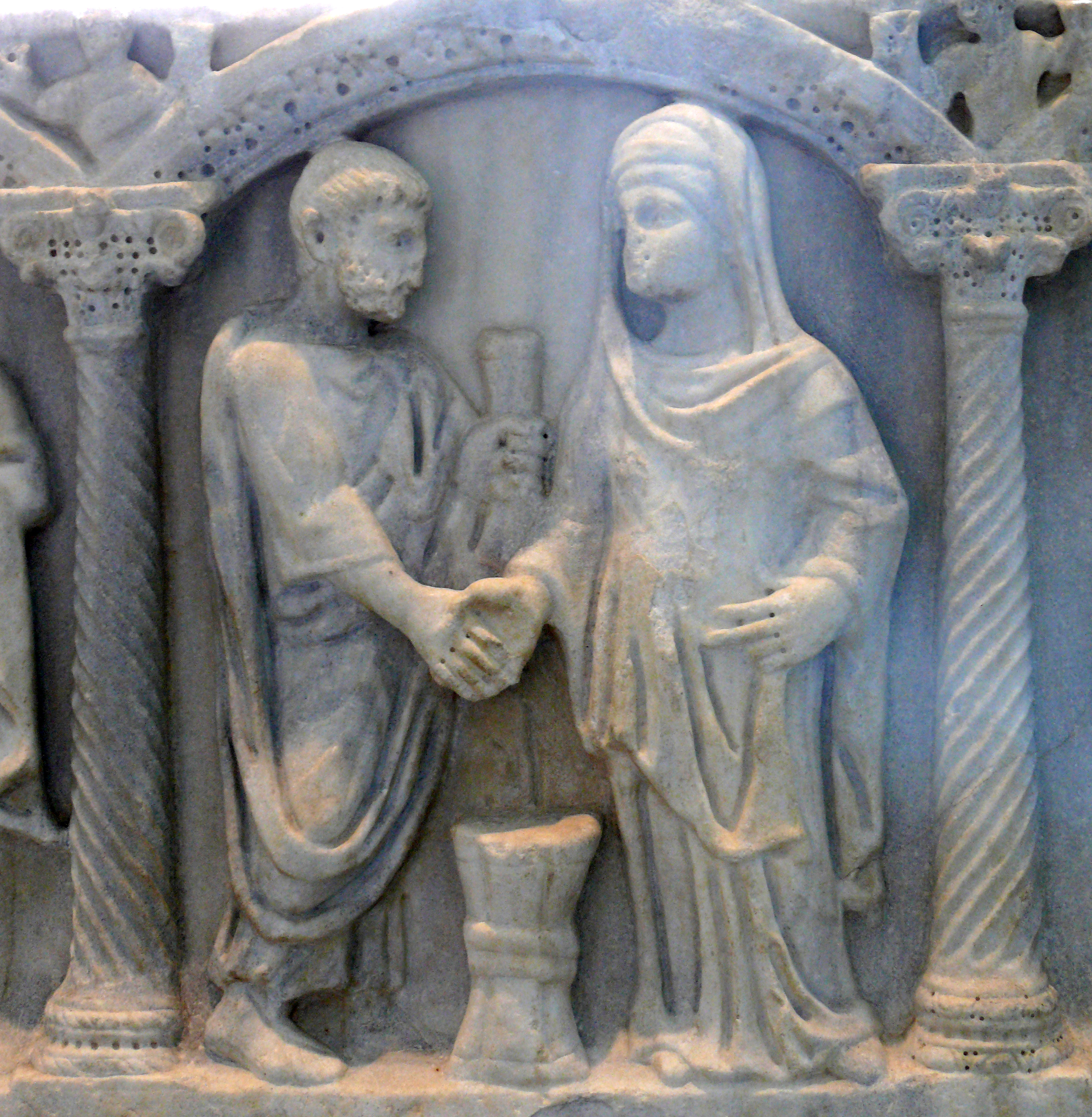
Roman couple in the ceremonial joining of hands; the bride's knotted belt symbolized that her husband was "belted and bound" to her. 4th century sarcophagus

Family tomb inscriptions of respectable Romans suggest that the ideal Roman marriage was one of mutual loyalty, in which husband and wife shared interests, activities, and property.

In the earliest period of the Roman Republic, a bride passed from her father's control into the "hand" (manus) of her husband. She then became subject to her husband's potestas, though to a lesser degree than their children. In the earliest periods of Roman history, Manus marriage meant that a married woman would be subjugated by her husband. That custom had died out by the 1st century BCE in favor of free marriage, which did not grant a husband any rights over his wife or cause any significant change to a newly-married woman's status. During the classical era of Roman law, marriage required no ceremony, but only a mutual will and agreement to live together in harmony. Marriage ceremonies, contracts, and other formalities were meant only to prove that a couple had, in fact, married. Under early or archaic Roman law, marriages were of three kinds: confarreatio, symbolized by the sharing of bread (panis farreus); coemptio, "by purchase"; and usus, "by mutual cohabitation". Patricians always married by confarreatio, while plebeians married by the latter two types. In marriage by usus, if a woman was absent for three consecutive nights at least once a year, she would avoid her husband establishing legal control over her. This differed from the Athenian custom of arranged marriage and sequestration, which did not allow wives to walk the streets unescorted.

The form of marriage known as manus was the norm in the early Republic, but became less frequent thereafter. The bride's dowry, any inheritance rights transferred through her marriage, and any subsequently-acquired property belonged to her husband. Husbands could divorce their wives on grounds of adultery, and a few cases of divorce on the grounds of a wife's infertility are recorded. Manus marriage was an unequal relationship; it changed a woman’s intestate heirs from her siblings to her children, not because she was their mother but because her legal status was the same as that of a daughter to her husband. Under manus, women were expected to obey their husbands in almost all aspects of their lives.

This archaic form of manus marriage was largely abandoned by the time of Julius Caesar, when a woman remained under her father's authority by law even when she moved into her husband's home. This arrangement was one of the factors in the independence Roman women enjoyed relative to those of many other ancient cultures and up to the modern period: So-called "free" marriage caused no change in personal status for either the wife or the husband. Free marriage usually involved two citizens, or a citizen and a person who held Latin rights, and in the later Imperial period and with official permission, soldier-citizens and non-citizens. In a free marriage a bride brought a dowry to the husband: if the marriage ended with no cause of adultery he returned most of it. The law's separation of property was so total that gifts between spouses were not recognized as such. If a couple divorced or even separated, the giver could reclaim the gift.

==== Divorce ====
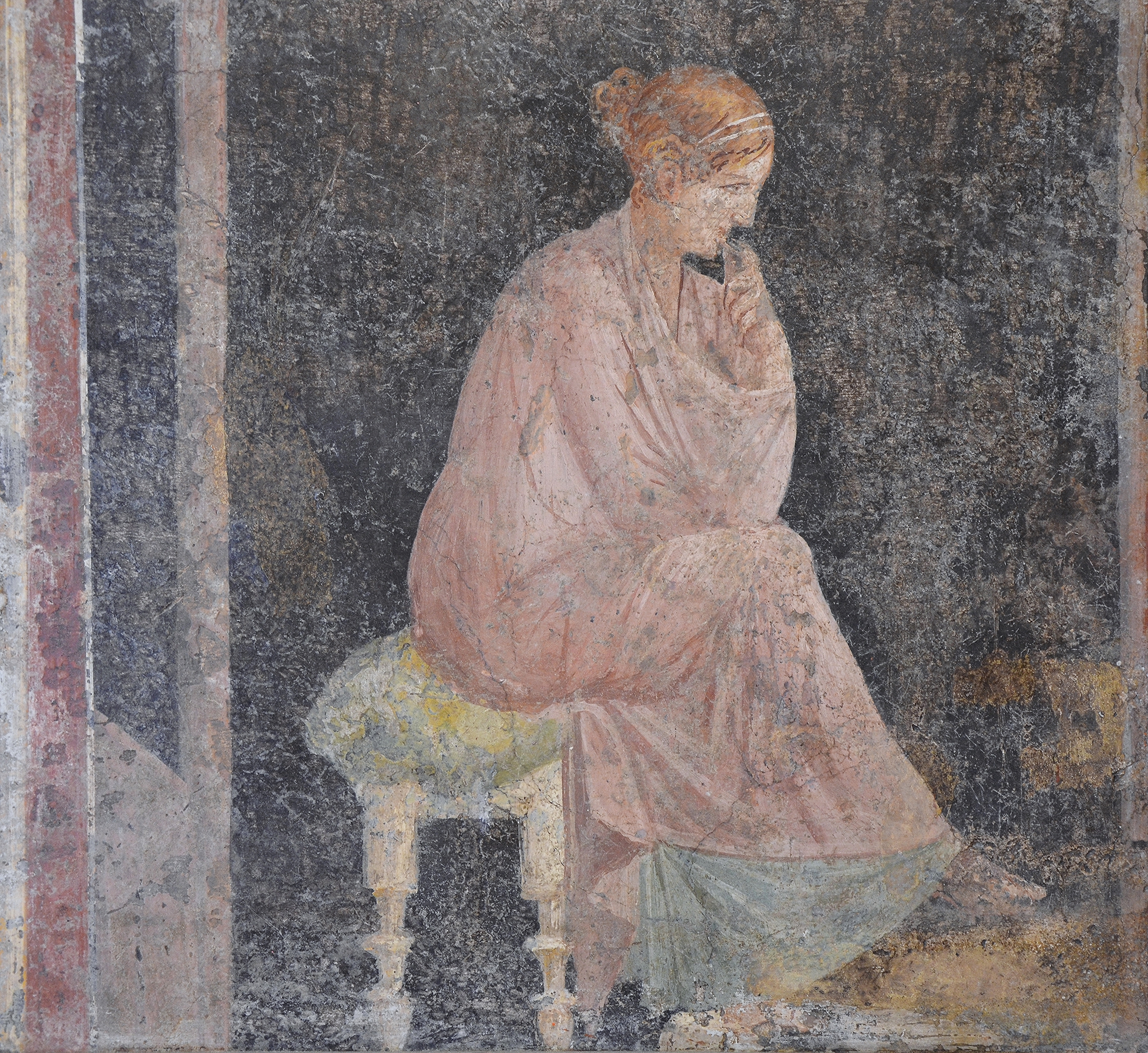
Fresco of a seated woman from Stabiae, 1st century AD

Divorce was a legal but relatively informal affair which mainly involved a wife leaving her husband’s house and taking back her dowry. According to the historian Valerius Maximus, divorces were taking place by 604 BCE or earlier, and the law code as embodied in the mid-5th century BCE by the Twelve Tables provides for divorce. Divorce was socially acceptable if carried out within social norms (mos maiorum). By the time of Cicero and Julius Caesar, divorce was relatively common and "shame-free", the subject of gossip rather than a social disgrace. Valerius says that Lucius Annius was disapproved of because he divorced his wife without consulting his friends; that is, he undertook the action for his own purposes and without considering its effects on his social network (amicitia and clientela). The censors of 307 BCE thus expelled him from the Senate for moral turpitude.

Elsewhere, however, it is claimed that the first divorce took place only in 230 BCE, at which time Dionysius of Halicarnassus notes that "Spurius Carvilius, a man of distinction, was the first to divorce his wife" on grounds of infertility. This was most likely the Spurius Carvilius Maximus Ruga who was consul in 234 and 228 BCE. The evidence is confused.

During the classical period of Roman law (late Republic and Principate), a man or woman could end a marriage simply because he or she wanted to, and for no other reason. Unless the wife could prove the spouse was worthless, he kept the children. Because property had been kept separate during the marriage, divorce from a "free" marriage was a very easy procedure.

==== Remarriage ====
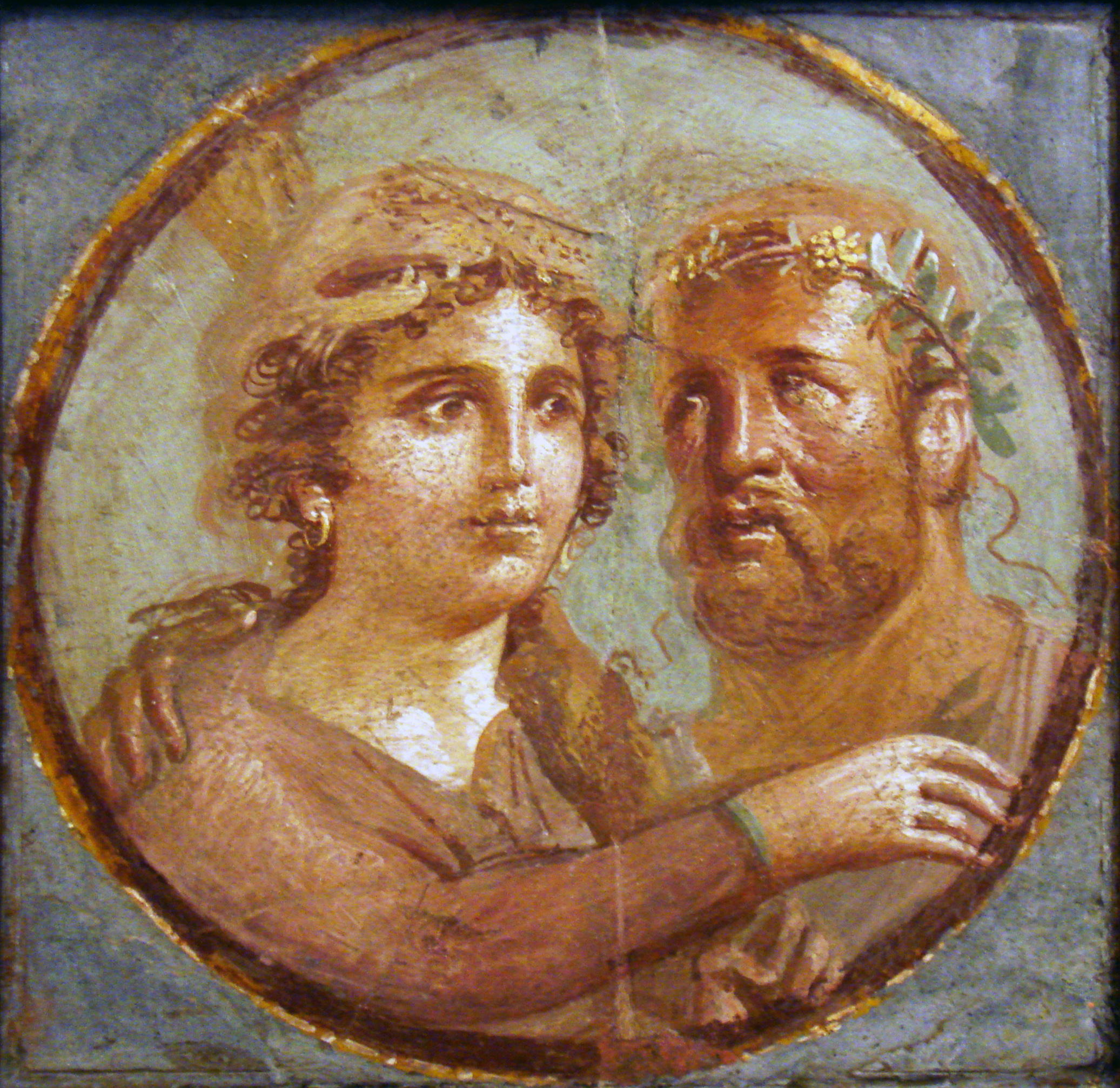
Heracles and Omphale, Roman fresco, Pompeian Fourth Style (45–79 AD), Naples National Archaeological Museum, Italy

The frequency of remarriage among the elite was high. Speedy remarriage was not unusual, and perhaps even customary, for aristocratic Romans after the death of a spouse. While no formal waiting period was dictated for a widower, it was customary for a woman to remain in mourning for ten months before remarrying. The duration may have allowed for pregnancy: if a woman had become pregnant just before her husband's death, the period of ten months ensured that no question of paternity -- which might affect the child's social status and inheritance -- arose. No law prohibited pregnant women from marrying, and there are well-known instances: Augustus married Livia when she was carrying her former husband's child, and the College of Pontiffs ruled that it was permissible as long as the child's father was determined first. Livia's previous husband even attended the wedding.

Because elite marriages often occurred for reasons of politics or property, a widow or divorcée with assets in these areas faced few obstacles to remarrying. She was far more likely to be legally emancipated than a first-time bride, and to have a say in the choice of husband. The marriages of Fulvia, who commanded troops during the last civil war of the Republic and who was the first Roman woman to have her face on a coin, are thought to indicate her own political sympathies and ambitions. Fulvia was married first to the popularist champion Clodius Pulcher, who was murdered after a long feud with Cicero; then to Scribonius Curio; and finally to Mark Antony, the last opponent to the republican oligarchs and to Rome's future first emperor.

The Greek observer Plutarch indicates that a second wedding among Romans was likely to be a quieter affair, as a widow would still feel the absence of her dead husband, and a divorcée ought to feel shame. But while the circumstances of divorce might be shameful or embarrassing, and remaining married to the same person for life was ideal, there was no general disapproval of remarriage; on the contrary, marriage was considered the right and desirable condition of adult life for both men and women. Cato the Younger, who presented himself as a paragon modeled after his moral namesake, allowed his pregnant wife Marcia to divorce him and marry Hortensius, declining to offer his young daughter to the 60-year-old orator instead. After the widowed Marcia inherited considerable wealth, Cato married her again, in a ceremony lacking many of the formalities. Women might be mocked, however, for marrying too often or capriciously, particularly if it could be implied that sexual appetites or vanity were motives.

==== Concubinage ====
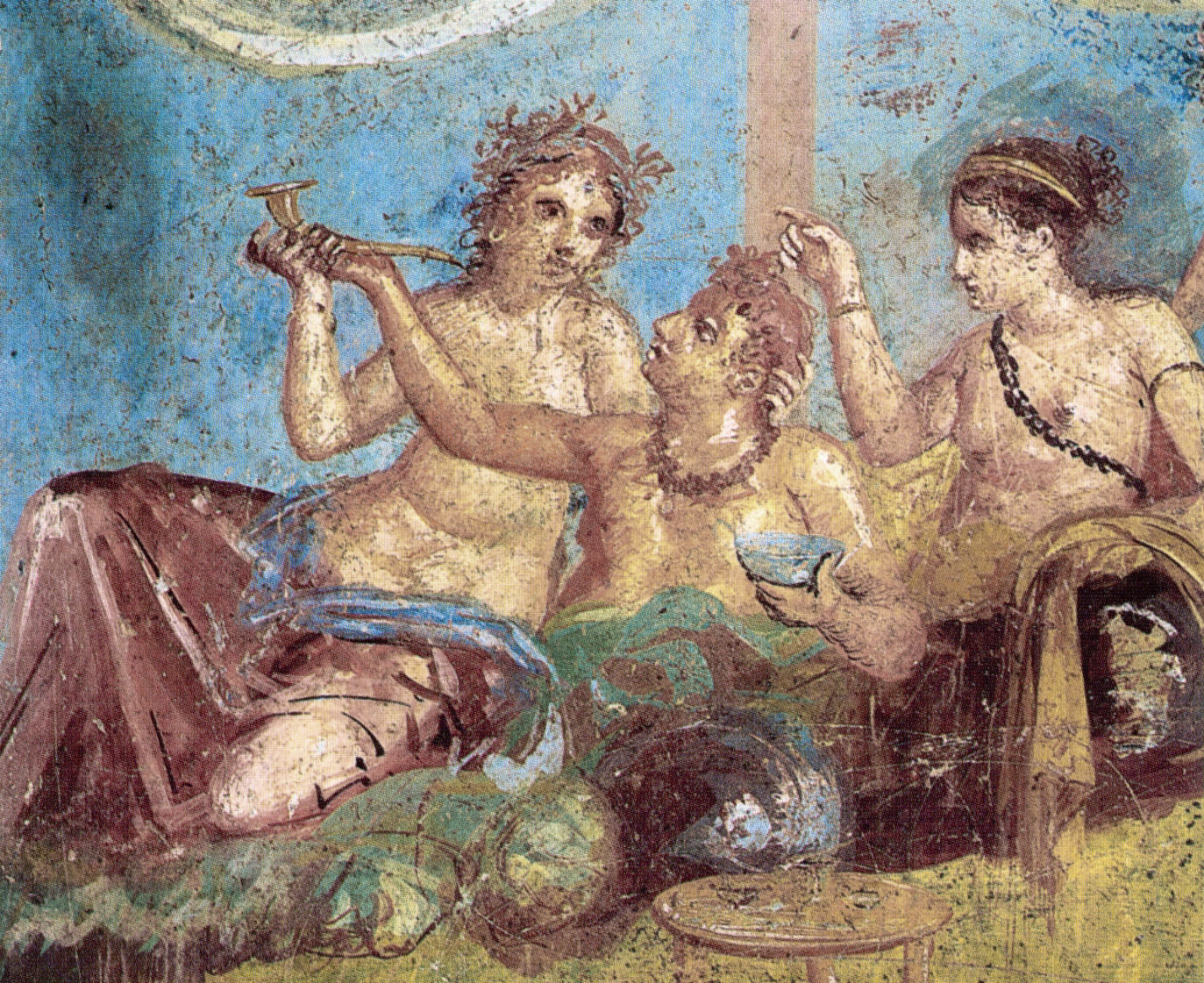
Roman fresco with a banquet scene from the Casa dei Casti Amanti, Pompeii

A concubine was defined by Roman law as a woman living in a permanent monogamous relationship with a man not her husband. There was no dishonor in being a concubine or living with a concubine, and a concubine could become a wife. Gifts could be exchanged between the partners in concubinage, in contrast to marriage, which maintained a more defined separation of property.

Couples usually resorted to concubinage when inequality of social rank was an obstacle to marriage. For instance, a man of senatorial rank and a woman who was a social inferior, such as a freedwoman or one who had a questionable background of poverty or prostitution, might enter into concubinage. Two partners who lacked the right to legal marriage, or conubium, might also do so. Concubinage differed from marriage chiefly in the status of children born from the relationship. Children had their mother's social rank, and not, as was customary, their father's.

==== Domestic abuse ====
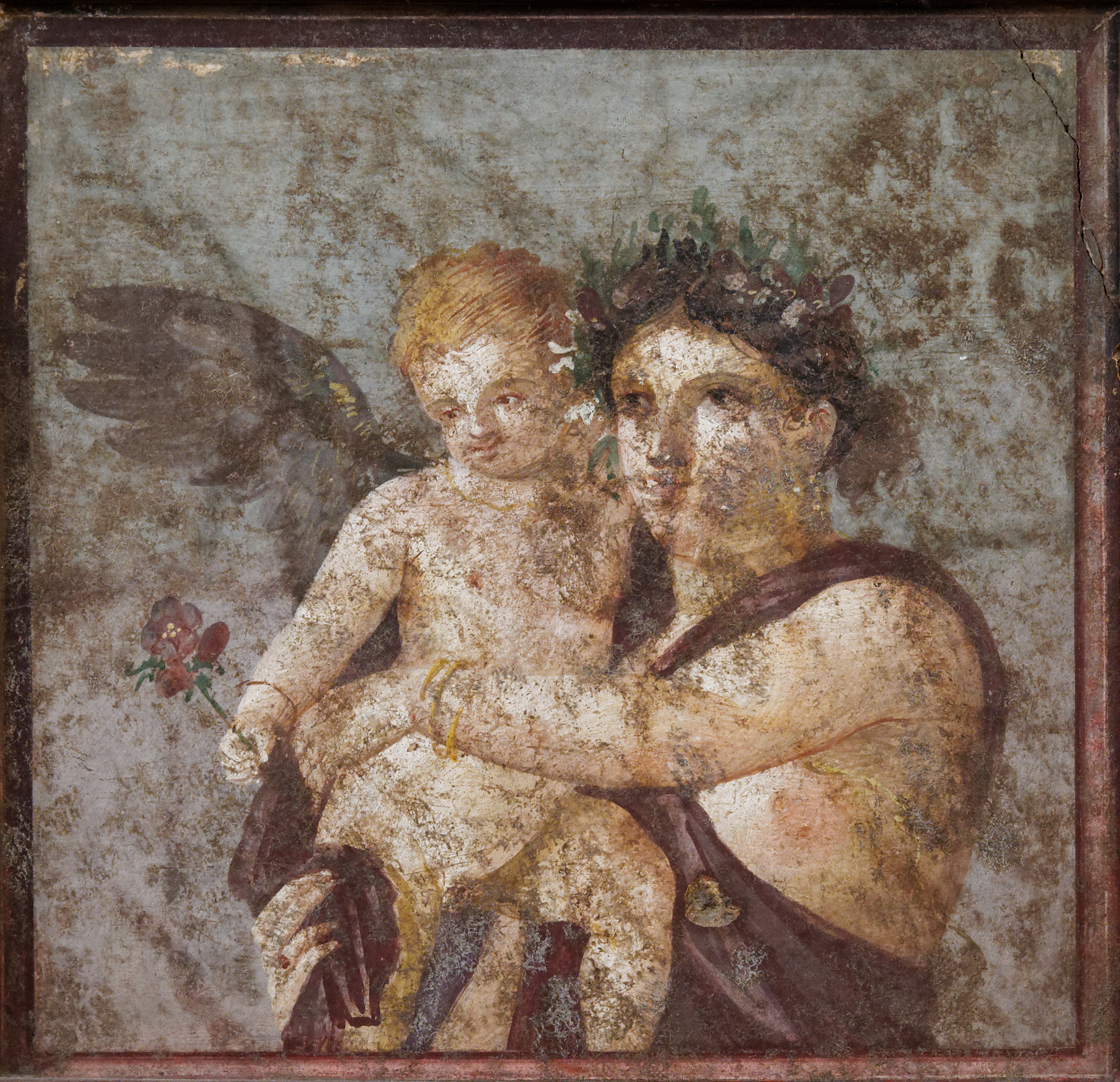
A maenad with a cupid in her arms, fresco, 1st century AD

Classical Roman law did not allow domestic abuse by a husband to his wife, However, as with any other crime, laws against domestic abuse do not necessarily prevent it. Cato the Elder said, according to his biographer Plutarch, "that the man who struck his wife or child laid violent hands on the holiest of holy things." A man of status during the Roman Republic was expected to behave moderately toward his wife and to define himself as a good husband. Wife beating was sufficient grounds for divorce or other legal action against the husband.

Domestic abuse enters the historical record mainly when it involves the egregious excesses of the elite. The Emperor Nero was alleged to have had his first wife (and stepsister) Claudia Octavia murdered after subjecting her to torture and imprisonment. Nero then married his pregnant mistress Poppaea Sabina, whom he kicked to death for criticizing him. Some modern historians believe that Poppaea died from a miscarriage or childbirth, and that the story was exaggerated to vilify Nero. The despised Commodus may have killed his wife and his sister.

=== Motherhood ===
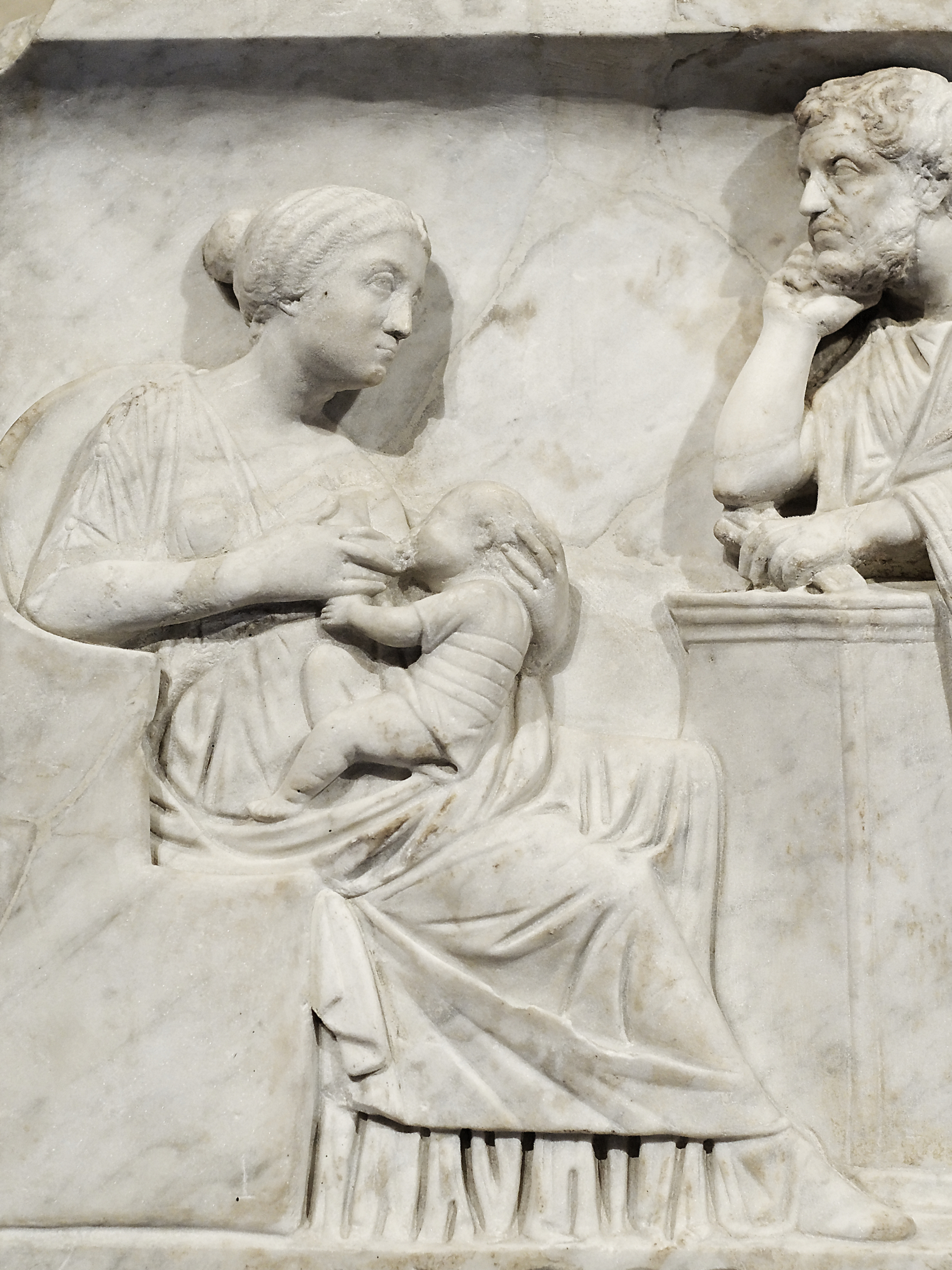
Mother nursing an infant in the presence of the father, detail from a young boy's sarcophagus c. 150 CE

Roman wives were expected to bear children, but the women of the aristocracy, accustomed to a degree of independence, showed a growing disinclination to devote themselves to traditional motherhood. By the 1st century CE, most elite women avoided breast-feeding their infants themselves and thus hired wet-nurses. This practice was not uncommon as early as the 2nd century BCE, when the comic playwright Plautus mentions wet-nurses. Since a mother's milk was considered best for the baby, aristocratic women might still choose to breast-feed unless physical reasons prevented it. If a woman did choose not to nurse her own child, she could visit the Columna Lactaria ("Milk Column"), where poor parents could obtain milk for their infants as charity from wet nurses and more affluent parents could hire a wet nurse. Licinia, the wife of Cato the Elder (d. 149 BCE), is reported to have nursed not only her son, but sometimes the infants of her slaves, to encourage "brotherly affection" among them. By the time of Tacitus (d. 117 CE), breastfeeding by elite matrons was idealized as a practice of the virtuous old days.

Large families were not the norm among the elite even by the Late Republic; the family of Clodius Pulcher, who had at least three sisters and two brothers, was considered unusual. The birth rate among the aristocracy declined to such an extent that the first Roman emperor Augustus (reigned 27 BCE–14 CE) passed a series of laws intended to increase it. These laws provided special honors for women who bore at least three children (the ius trium liberorum). Women who were unmarried, divorced, widowed, or barren were prohibited from inheriting property unless named in a will.

The extent to which Roman women might expect their husbands to participate in the rearing of very young children seems to vary and is hard to determine. Traditionalists such as Cato appear to have taken an interest, as Cato liked to be present when his wife bathed and swaddled their child. Roman women were not only valued for the number of children that they produced, but also for their part in raising and educating children to become good citizens. To rear children for successful lives, an exemplary Roman mother needed to be well-educated herself. One of the Roman women most famous for their strength and influence as a mother was Cornelia, the mother of the Gracchi. Julius Caesar, whose father died when he was only a young teen, had a close relationship with his mother, Aurelia. Aurelia's political clout was essential in preventing the execution of her 18-year-old son during the proscriptions of Sulla.

== Daily life ==
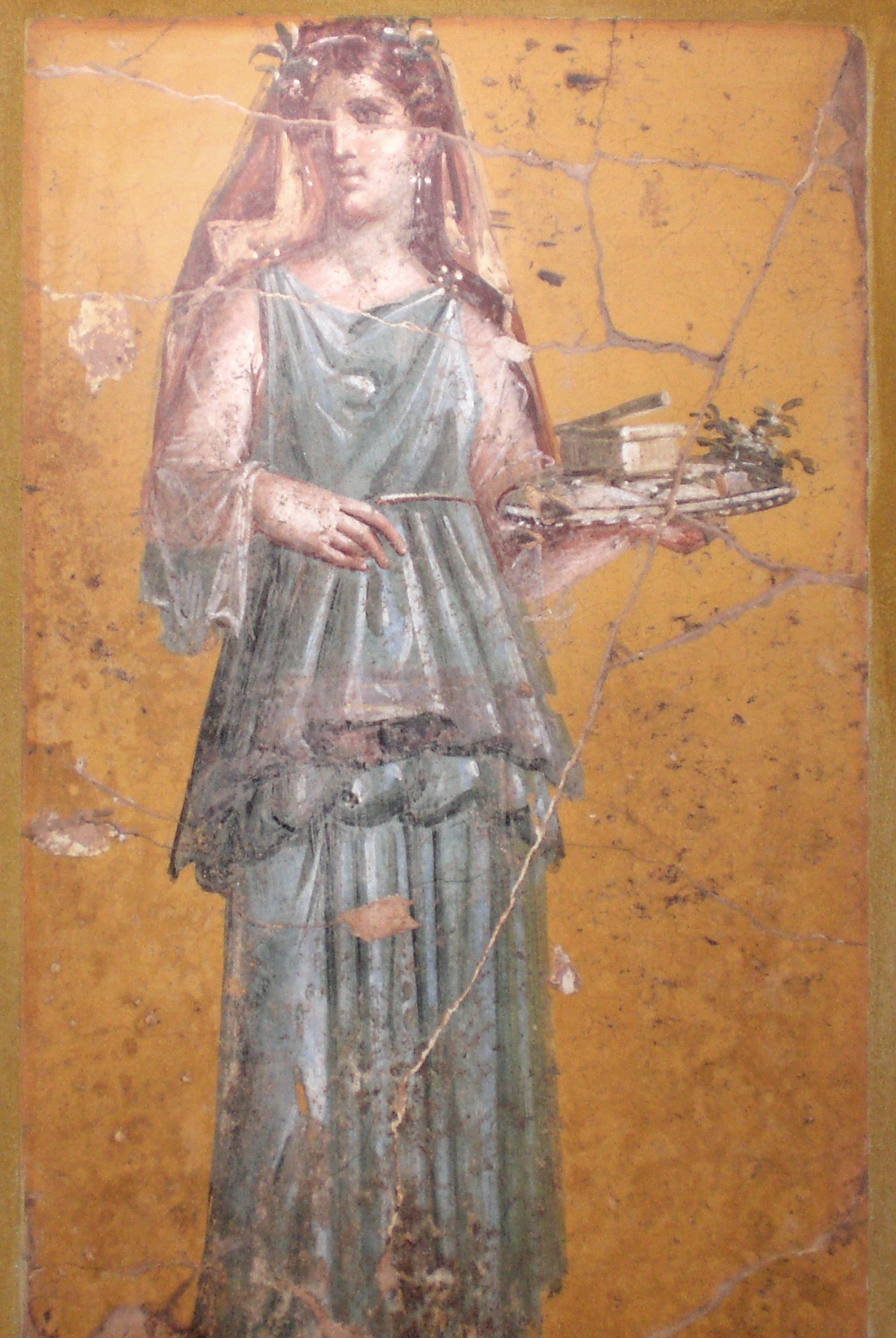
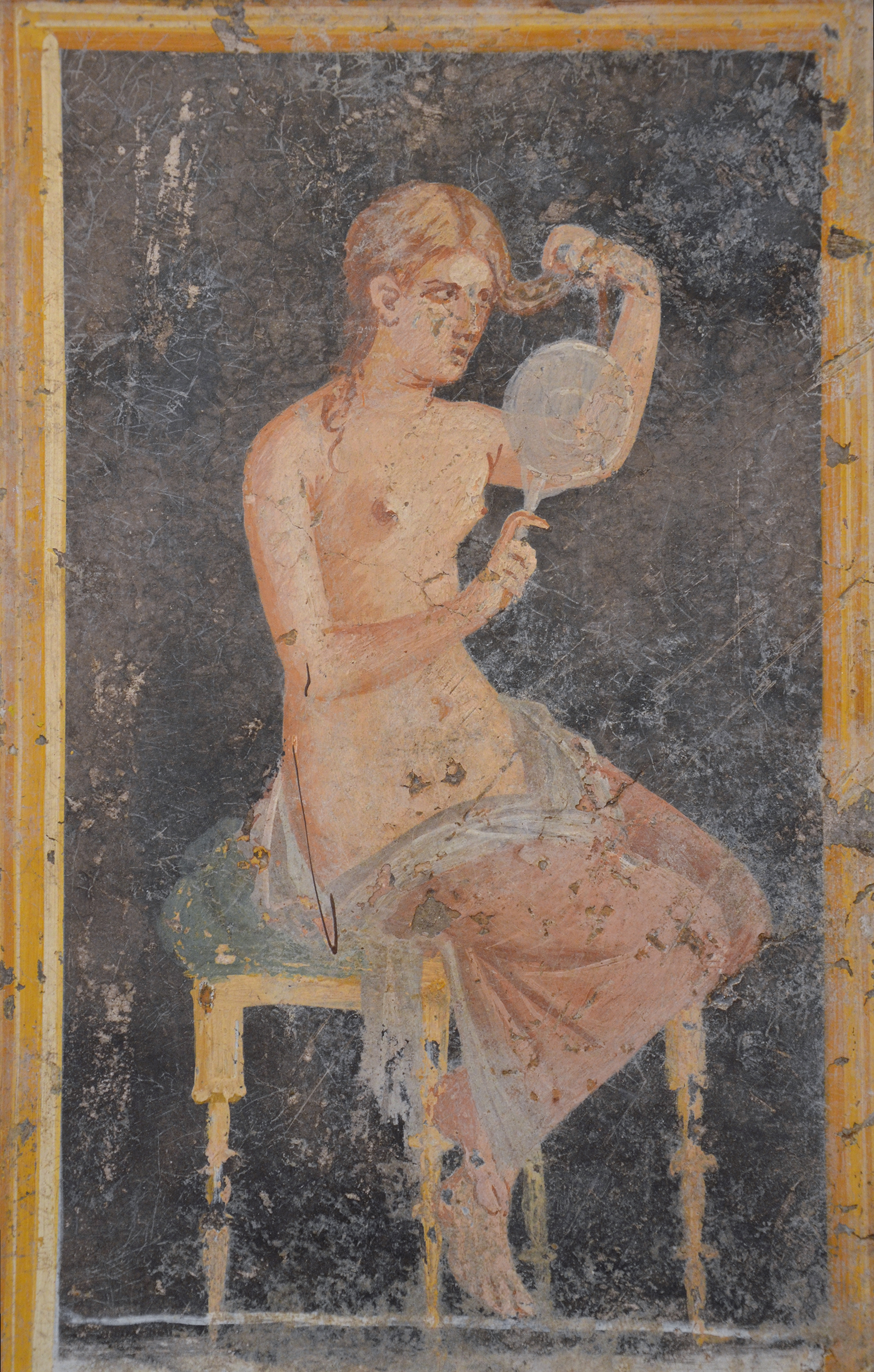
Left image: Wall painting from the Vila San Marco, Stabiae, 1st century
Right image: A woman fixing her hair in the mirror, fresco from the Villa of Arianna at Stabiae, 1st century AD

Aristocratic women managed a large and complex household. Since wealthy couples often owned multiple homes and country estates with dozens or even hundreds of slaves -- some of whom were educated and highly skilled -- this could be the equivalent of running a small corporation. In addition to the sociopolitically important responsibilities of entertaining guests, clients, and visiting dignitaries from abroad, the husband held his morning business meetings (salutatio) at home. The home (domus) was also the center of the family's social identity, with ancestral portraits displayed in the entrance hall (atrium). Since the most ambitious aristocratic men were frequently away from home on military campaign or administrative duty in the provinces, sometimes for years at a time, the maintenance of the family's property and business decisions were often left to the wives. For instance, while Julius Caesar was away from Rome throughout the 50s BCE, his wife Calpurnia was responsible for taking care of his assets. When Ovid, regarded as Rome's greatest living poet, was exiled by Augustus in 8 CE, his wife exploited social connections and legal maneuvers to hold on to the family's property, on which their livelihood depended. Ovid expresses his love and admiration for her lavishly in the poetry he wrote during his exile. Frugality, parsimony, and austerity were characteristics of the virtuous matron.

One of the most important tasks for women was to oversee clothing production. In the early Roman period, the spinning of wool was a central domestic occupation and indicated a family's self-sufficiency, since the wool would be produced on their estates. Even in an urban setting, wool was often a symbol of a wife's duties, and equipment for spinning might appear on the funeral monument of a woman to show that she was a good and honorable matron. Even women of the upper classes were expected to be able to spin and weave in virtuous emulation of their rustic ancestors—a practice ostentatiously observed by Livia.

=== In business ===
"One of the most curious characteristics of that age," observed French classical scholar Gaston Boissier, "was that the women appear as much engaged in business and as interested in speculations as the men. Money is their first care. They work their estates, invest their funds, lend and borrow. We find one among Cicero's creditors, and two among his debtors." Although Roman society did not allow women to gain official political power, it did allow them to enter business.

Even women of wealth were not supposed to be idle ladies of leisure. Among the aristocracy, women as well as men lent money to their peers to avoid resorting to a moneylender. When Pliny was considering buying an estate, he factored in a loan from his mother-in-law as a guarantee rather than an option. Women also joined in funding public works, as is frequently documented by inscriptions during the Imperial period. The "lawless" Politta, who appears in the Martyrdom of Pionius, owned estates in the province of Asia. Inscriptions record her generosity in funding the renovation of the Sardis gymnasium.

Because women had the right to own property, they might engage in the same business transactions and management practices as any landowner. As with their male counterparts, their management of slaves appears to have varied from relative care to negligence and outright abuse. During the First Servile War, Megallis and her husband Damophilus were both killed by their slaves on account of their brutality, but their daughter was spared because of her kindness and granted safe passage out of Sicily, along with an armed escort.

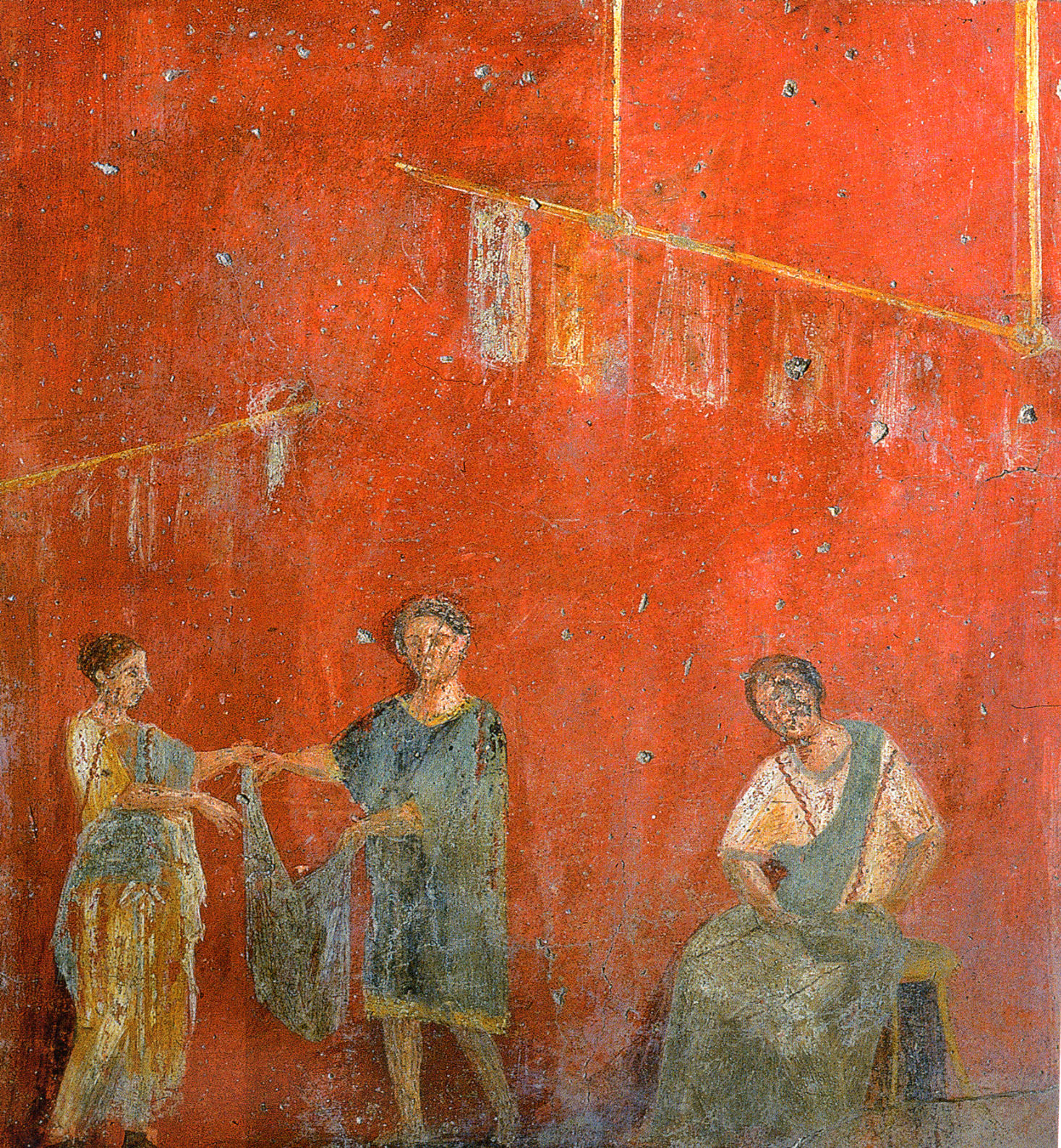
Women and a man working alongside one another at a dye shop (fullonica), on a wall painting from Pompeii

Unlike landholding, industry was not considered an honorable profession for those of senatorial rank. Cicero suggested that in order to gain respectability a merchant should buy land. Attitudes changed during the Empire, however, and Claudius created legislation to encourage the upper classes to engage in shipping. Women of the upper classes are documented as owning and running shipping corporations.

Trade and manufacturing are not well represented in Roman literature, which was produced for and largely by the elite, but funerary inscriptions sometimes record the profession of the deceased, including women. Women are known to have owned and operated brick factories. A woman might develop skills to complement her husband's trade, or manage aspects of his business. Artemis the gilder was married to Dionysius the helmet maker, as indicated by a curse tablet asking for the destruction of their household, workshop, work, and livelihood. The status of ordinary women who owned a business seems to have been regarded as exceptional. Laws during the Imperial period aimed at punishing women for adultery exempted those "who have charge of any business or shop" from prosecution.

Funeral monuments, inscriptions and other archeological remains demonstrate that women could be active within a number of different professions and in the business world: from builders to factory workers, from market sellers of anything from beans to nails to perfumer, business agent and medical doctor.

The ancient Roman city of Pompeii, which gives an unusually rich documentation of women's range of professions and business opportunities, gives a number of examples of individual Roman women with a wide range of professions. A number of businesswomen are noted among the citizens of Pompeii. Among them were Naevoleia Tyche, a former slave, businesswoman and investor, who became rich enough to build a magnificent grave monument; the real estate owner and landlord Julia Felix; the money lender Faustilla; the vine producer Caesia Helpis, whose vines were sold by the female vine merchant Vibia; the fish sauce seller Umbricia Fortunata; the perfumer Gavia Severa; the very successful Eumachia, who was both the owner of a factory as well as a priestess and the benefactor of a professional guild organization; and Flavia Seia Isaurica, who was active in the brick industry in the 140s.

Some typical occupations for a woman would be wet nurse, actress, dancer or acrobat, prostitute, and midwife—not all of equal respectability. Prostitutes and performers such as actresses were stigmatized as infames, people who had recourse to few legal protections even if they were free. Inscriptions indicate that a woman who was a wet nurse (nutrix) would be quite proud of her occupation. Women could be scribes and secretaries, including "girls trained for beautiful writing", that is, calligraphers. Pliny gives a list of female artists and their paintings.

Most Romans lived in insulae (apartment buildings), and those housing the poorer plebeian and non-citizen families usually lacked kitchens. The need to buy prepared food meant that takeaway food was a thriving business. Most of the Roman poor, whether male or female, young or old, earned a living through their own labour.

=== In politics ===
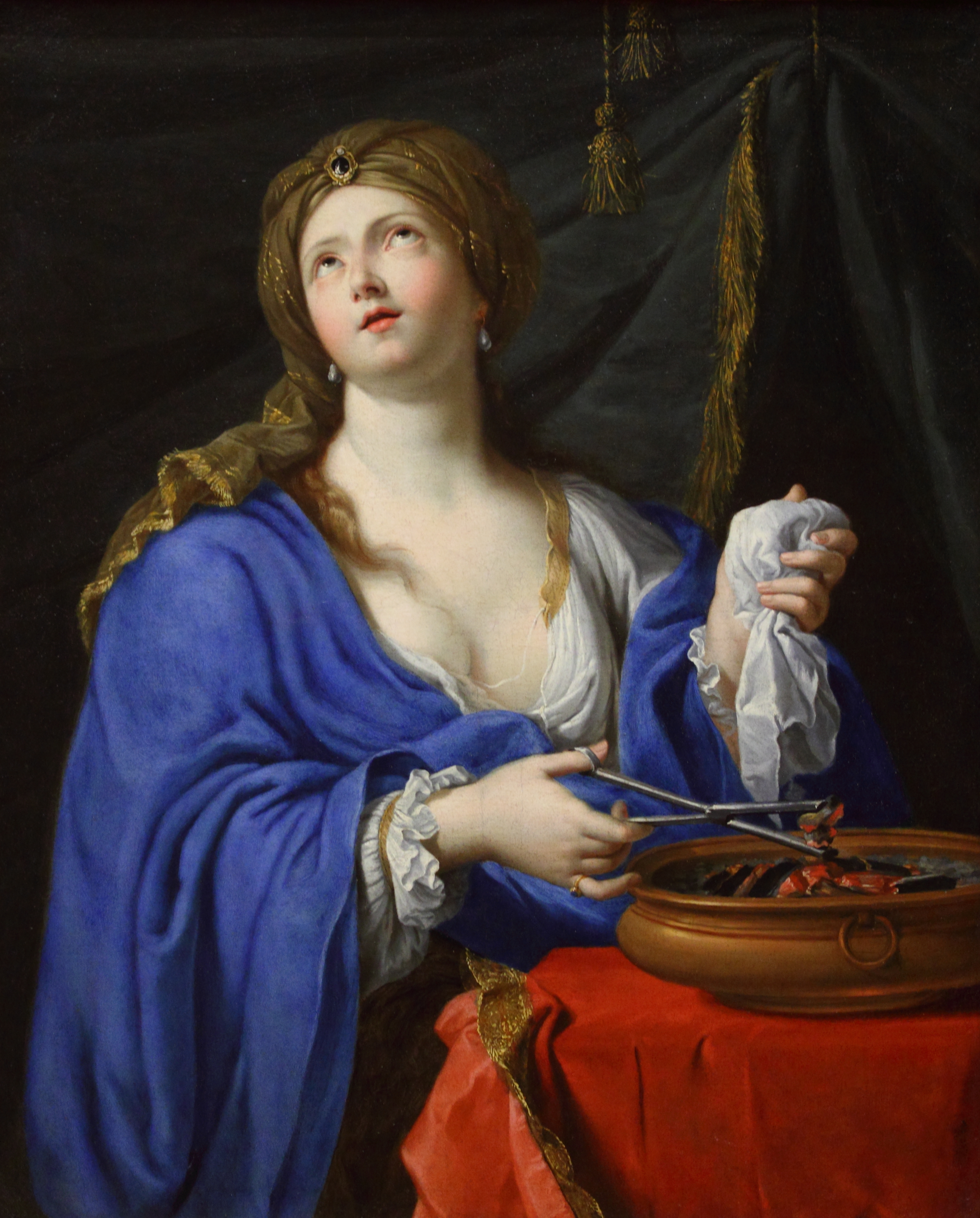
The suicide of Porcia, daughter of Cato and wife of Brutus, as pictured by Pierre Mignard

Women had limited engagement with politics in the public sphere; among the elite, moralists extolled female domesticity. Rome's political system involved citizen men exclusively—as politicians, representatives, magistrates, executives or voters. Many women had citizen rights but none had the vote, regardless of their wealth or their position in Roman society. though some elite women could manipulate or persuade their husbands and through them exercise political influence and in some cases, control. Ronald Syme notes, with reference to politics in the Late Republic, that "the daughters of the nobilitas could not be cheated of the real and secret power that comes from influence. They count for more than does the average senator..." Livy's account of the framing and repeal of the sumptuary Lex Oppia, passed during the crisis of the Punic Wars, has the arch-traditionalist Cato the Censor (234–149) describe Rome's matrons, who collectively protested against the law on the streets of Rome, as an "army of women" seeking to undermine the authority of his own gender and class, even the very existence of Rome, in their pursuit of unrestrained licence to spend money—which he describes as a particularly female disease that could never be cured, only suppressed.

During the civil wars that ended the Republic, Appian reports the heroism of wives who saved their husbands. An epitaph known as the Laudatio Turiae preserves a husband's eulogy for his wife, who during the civil war following the death of Julius Caesar endangered her own life and relinquished her jewelry to send support to her husband in exile. Both survived the turbulence of the time to enjoy a long marriage. Porcia, the daughter of Cato the Younger and wife of Brutus the assassin, came to a less fortunate but (in the eyes of her time) heroic end: she killed herself as the Republic collapsed, just as her father did.

The rise of Augustus to sole power in the last decades of the 1st century BCE diminished the power of political officeholders and the traditional oligarchy, but did nothing to diminish and arguably increased the opportunities for women, as well as slaves and freedmen, to exercise influence behind the scenes. Augustus' wife, Livia Drusilla Augusta (58 BCE – CE 29), was the most powerful woman in the early Roman Empire, acting several times as regent and consistently as a faithful advisor. Several women of the Imperial family, such as Livia's great-granddaughter and Caligula's sister Agrippina the Younger, gained political influence as well as public prominence.

Women also participated in efforts to overthrow emperors, predominantly for personal gain. Shortly after Caligula's sister Drusilla died, her widower Marcus Aemilius Lepidus and her sisters Agrippina the Younger and Livilla conspired to overthrow Caligula. The plot was discovered, and Lepidus was executed. Agrippina and Livilla were exiled, and returned from exile only when their paternal uncle Claudius came to power after Caligula's assassination in 41 CE. In turn, Claudius's third wife Valeria Messalina conspired with Gaius Silius to overthrow her husband in the hope of installing herself and her lover in power.

Tacitus immortalized the woman Epicharis for her part in the Pisonian conspiracy, where she attempted to gain the support of the Roman fleet and was instead arrested. Once the conspiracy was uncovered, she would reveal nothing even under torture, in contrast to the senators, who were not subjected to torture and yet raced to spill the details. Tacitus also praises Egnatia Maximilla for sacrificing her fortune in order to stand by her innocent husband against Nero.

According to the Historia Augusta the emperor Elagabalus had his mother or grandmother take part in Senate proceedings. The author regarded this as one of Elagabalus's many scandals, and reported that the Senate's first act upon his death was to restore the ban on attendance by women. According to the same work, Elagabalus also established a women's senate called the senaculum, which enacted very detailed rules prescribing the correct public behaviour, jewelry, clothing, chariots and sundry personal items for matrons. This apparently built upon previous, less formal but exclusive meetings of elite wives; and before that, Agrippina the Younger, mother of Nero, had listened to Senate proceedings, while concealed behind a curtain, according to Tacitus (Annales, 13.5).

=== Women and the military ===
Classical texts have little to say about women and the Roman army. Although the Emperor Augustus (reigned 27 BC–AD 14) made marriage by ordinary soldiers unlawful, this probably meant that while soldiers and women in distant provinces and settlements formed relationships and had children, their relationships were not recognised in Roman law. Two centuries or so later, the ban was lifted. It has been suggested that wives and children of centurions lived with them at border and provincial forts. Shoes in women's and children's sizes were found very near Hadrian's Wall, at the frontier fort of Vindolanda at the same site, bronze military discharge certificates were found, granting citizenship after 25 years of service and mentioning wives and children. In Germany, women's brooches and shoes were excavated at a military site. Trajan's Column depicts six women amongst the soldiers at a military religious sacrifice.

=== Religious life ===
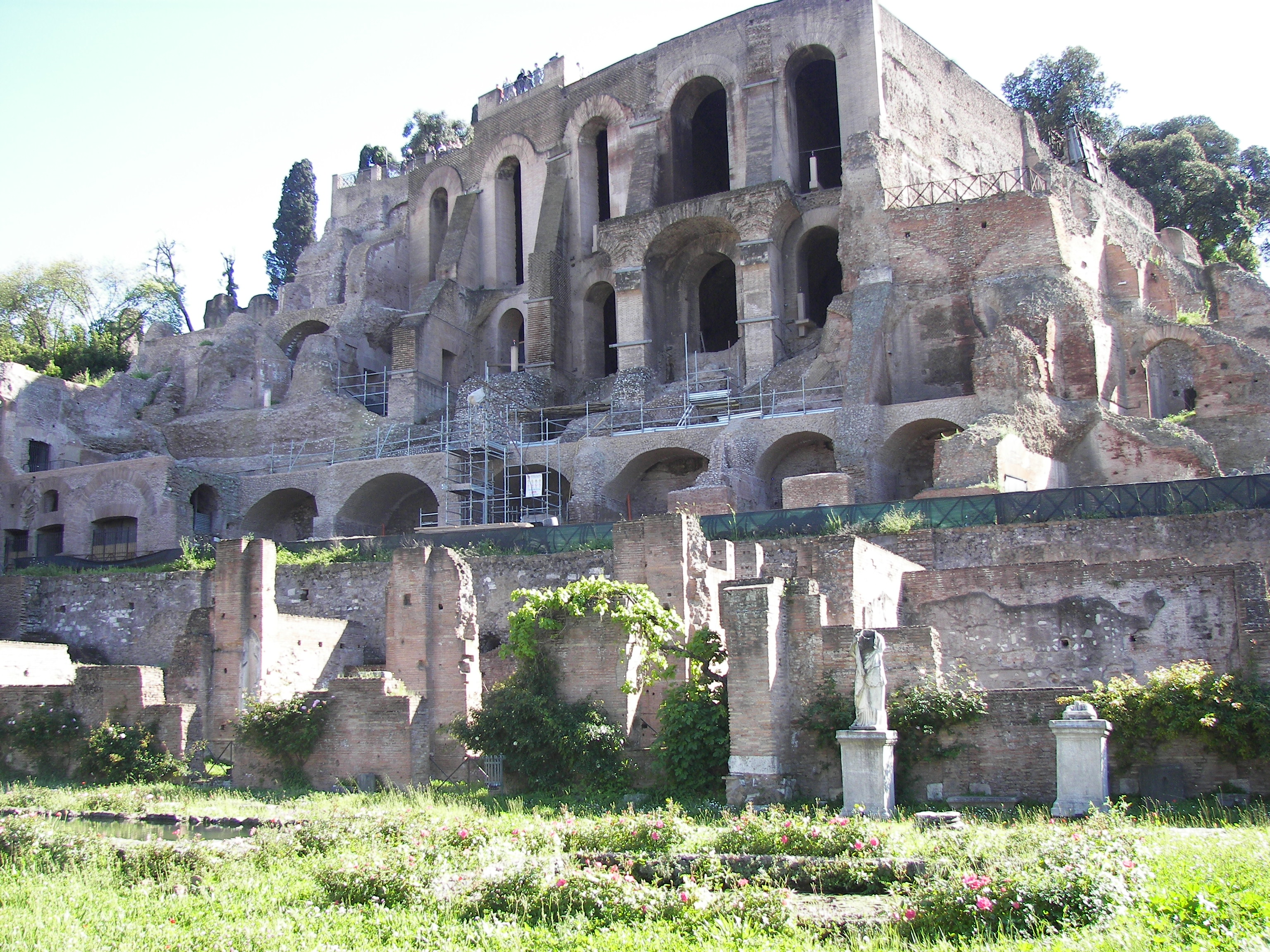
Ruins of the House of the Vestals, with pedestals for statuary in the foreground

Women were present at most Roman festivals and cult observances. Some rituals specifically required the presence of women, but their participation might be limited. As a rule women did not perform animal sacrifice, the central rite of most major public ceremonies, though this was less a matter of prohibition than the fact that most priests presiding over state religion were men. Some cult practices were reserved for women only, for example, the rites of the Good Goddess (Bona Dea).

Women priests played a prominent and crucial role in the official religion of Rome. Although the state colleges of male priests were far more numerous, the six women of the college of Vestals were Rome's only "full-time professional clergy". Sacerdos, plural sacerdotes, was the Latin word for a priest of either gender. Religious titles for women include sacerdos, often in relation to a deity or temple, such as a sacerdos Cereris or Cerealis, "priestess of Ceres", an office never held by men; magistra, a high priestess, female expert or teacher in religious matters; and ministra, a female assistant, particularly one in service to a deity. A magistra or ministra would have been responsible for the regular maintenance of a cult. Epitaphs provide the main evidence for these priesthoods, and the woman is often not identified in terms of her marital status.

The title sacerdos was often specified in relation to a deity or temple, such as a sacerdos Cereris or Cerealis, "priestess of Ceres", an office never held by men. Female sacerdotes played a leading role in the sanctuaries of Ceres and Proserpina in Rome and throughout Italy that observed so-called "Greek rite" (ritus graecus). This form of worship had spread from Sicily under Greek influence, and the Aventine cult of Ceres in Rome was headed by male priests. Only women celebrated the rites of the Bona Dea ("Good Goddess"), for whom sacerdotes are recorded. (Note: One title for a sacerdos of the Bona Dea was damiatrix, presumably from Damia, one of the names of Demeter and associated also with the Bona Dea.) The Temple of Ceres in Rome was surved by the Priestess of Ceres, Sacerdos Cereris, and the Temple of Bona Dea by the Priestess of Bona Dea, Sacerdos Bonae Deae. Other Priestesses were the Sacerdos Liberi, Sacerdos Fortunae Muliebris and the Sacerdos Matris Deum Magnae Idaeae; sacerdos also served as priestesses of the Imperial cult.

The Vestals possessed unique religious distinction, public status and privileges, and could exercise considerable political influence. It was also possible for them to amass "considerable wealth". Upon entering her office, a Vestal was emancipated from her father's authority. In archaic Roman society, these priestesses were the only women not required to be under the legal guardianship of a man, instead answering directly and only to the Pontifex Maximus. Their vow of chastity freed them of the traditional obligation to marry and rear children, but its violation carried a heavy penalty: a Vestal found to have polluted her office by breaking her vow was given food, water, and entombed alive. The independence of the Vestals thus existed in relation to the prohibitions imposed on them. In addition to conducting certain religious rites, the Vestals participated at least symbolically in every official sacrifice, as they were responsible for preparing the required ritual substance mola salsa. The Vestals seem to have retained their religious and social distinctions well into the 4th century CE, until the Christian emperors dissolved the order.

A few priesthoods were held jointly by married couples. Marriage was a requirement for the Flamen Dialis, the high priest of Jupiter; his wife, the Flaminica Dialis, had her own unique priestly attire, and like her husband was placed under obscure magico-religious prohibitions. The flaminica was a perhaps exceptional case of a woman performing animal sacrifice; she offered a ram to Jupiter on each of the nundinae, the eight-day Roman cycle comparable to a week. The couple were not permitted to divorce, and if the flaminica died the flamen had to resign his office.

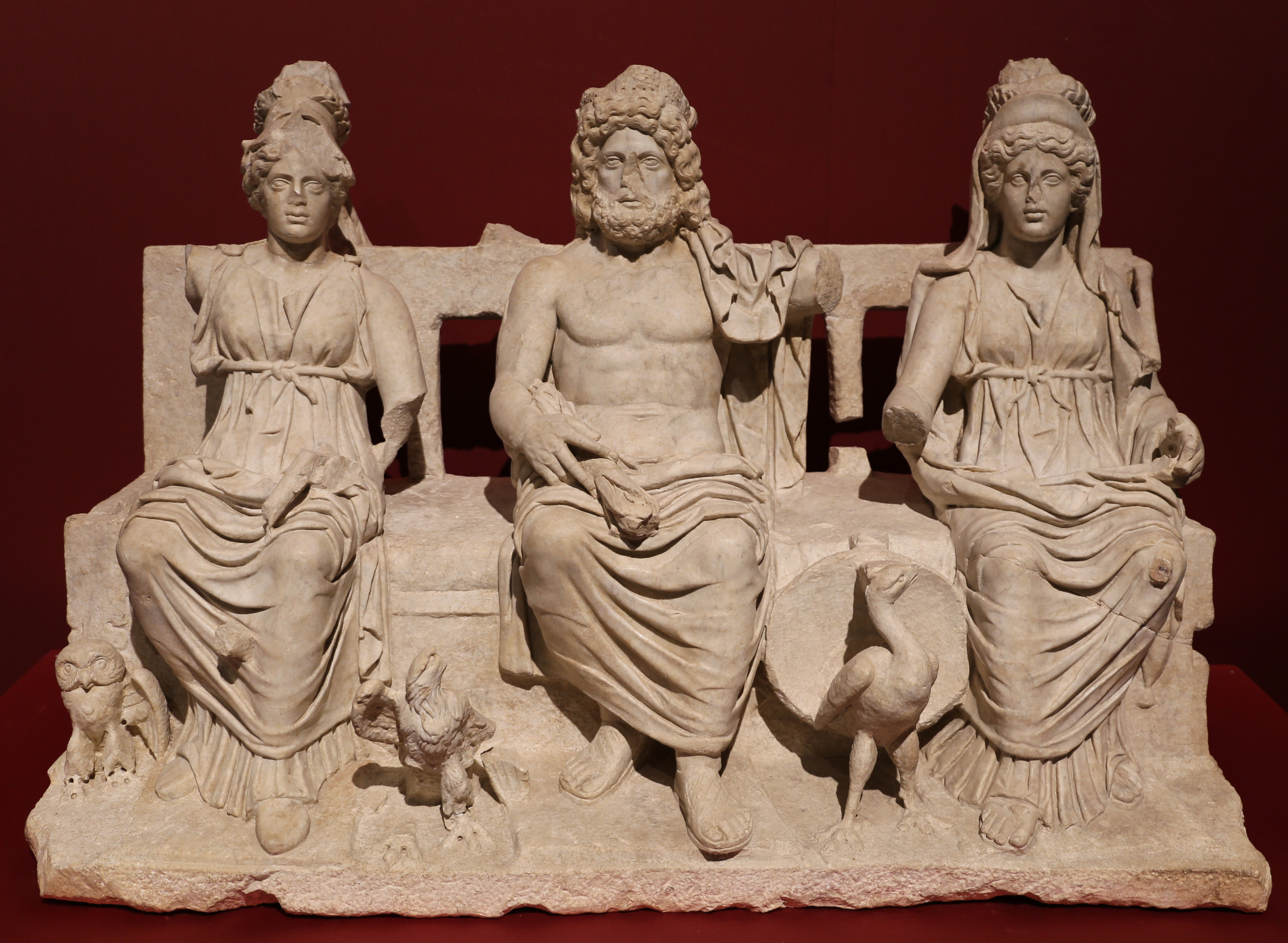
The Capitoline Triad of Minerva, Jupiter, and Juno

Like the Flaminica Dialis, the regina sacrorum, "queen of the sacred rites", wore distinctive ceremonial dress and performed animal sacrifice, offering a sow or female lamb to Juno on the first day of each month. The names of some reginae sacrorum are recorded by inscriptions. The regina was the wife of the rex sacrorum, "king of the sacred rites", an archaic priesthood regarded in the earliest period as more prestigious than even the Pontifex Maximus.

These highly public official duties for women contradict the commonplace notion that women in ancient Rome took part only in private or domestic religion. The dual male-female priesthoods may reflect the Roman tendency to seek a gender complement within the religious sphere; most divine powers are represented by both a male and a female deity, as seen in divine pairs such as Liber and Libera. The twelve major gods were presented as six gender-balanced pairs, and Roman religion departed from Indo-European tradition in installing two goddesses in its supreme triad of patron deities, Juno and Minerva along with Jupiter. This triad "formed the core of Roman religion."

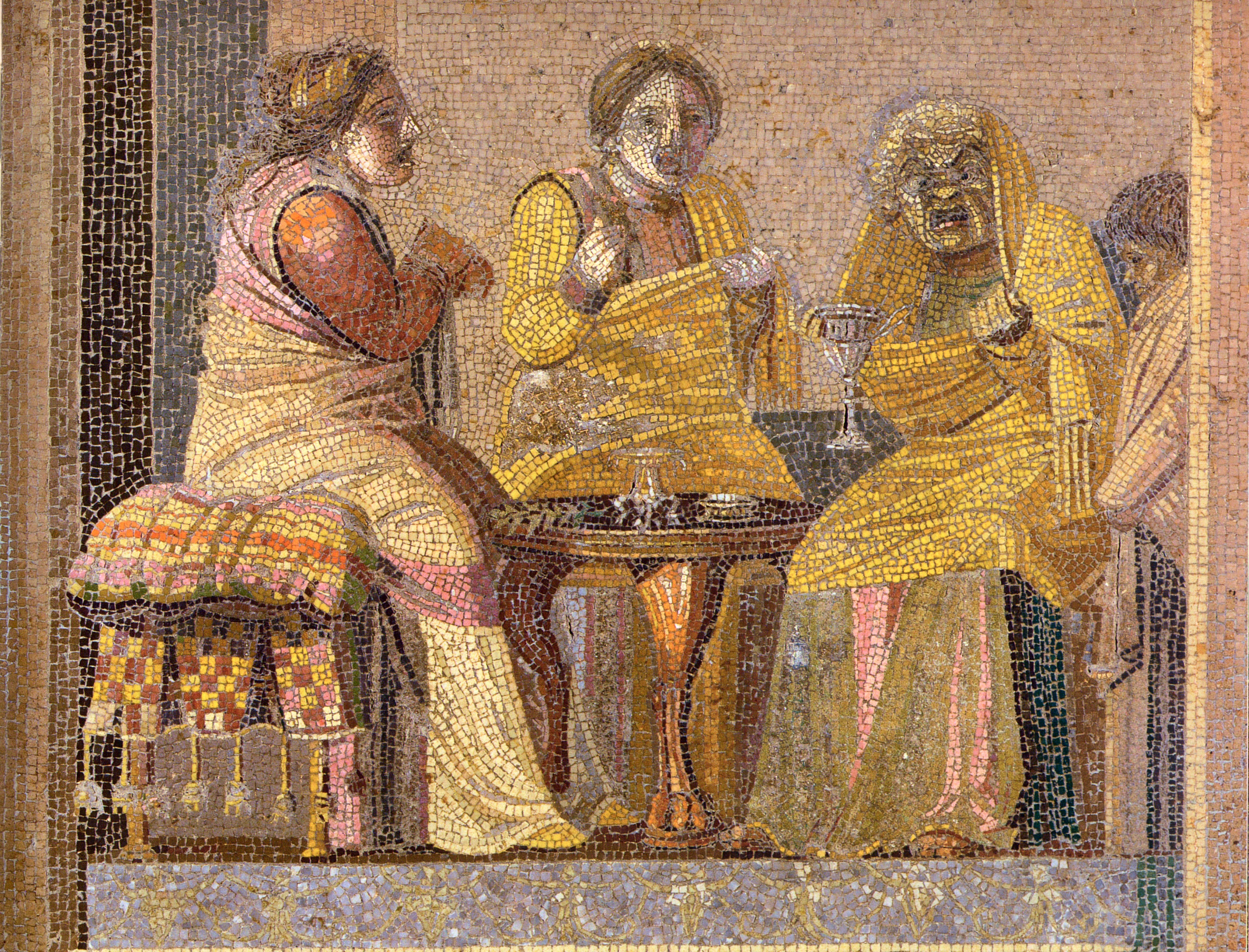
Mosaic depicting masked actors in a play: two women consult a "witch" or private diviner

From the Mid Republic onward, religious diversity became increasingly characteristic of the city of Rome. Many religions that were not part of Rome's earliest state cult offered leadership roles for women, among them the cult of Isis and of the Magna Mater. An epitaph preserves the title sacerdos maxima for a woman who held the highest priesthood of the Magna Mater's temple near the current site of St. Peter's Basilica.

Although less documented than public religion, private religious practices addressed aspects of life that were exclusive to women. At a time when the infant mortality rate was as high as 40 percent, divine aid was solicited for the life-threatening act of giving birth and the perils of caring for a baby. Invocations were directed at the goddesses Juno, Diana, Lucina, the di nixi, and a host of divine attendants devoted to birth and childrearing. Ceres was a significant Goddess in terms of childrearing but also in raising the daughter to be a good mother and wife. Ceres relationship with her own daughter was used as an example as to how Roman mothers should go about raising their daughters.

Male writers vary in their depiction of women's religiosity: some represent women as paragons of Roman virtue and devotion, but also inclined by temperament to excessive religious devotion, the lure of magic, or "superstition". Nor was "private" the same as "secret": Romans were suspicious of secretive religious practices, and Cicero cautioned that nocturnal sacrifices were not to be performed by women, except for those ritually prescribed pro populo, on behalf of the Roman people, that is, for the public good.

=== Social activities ===
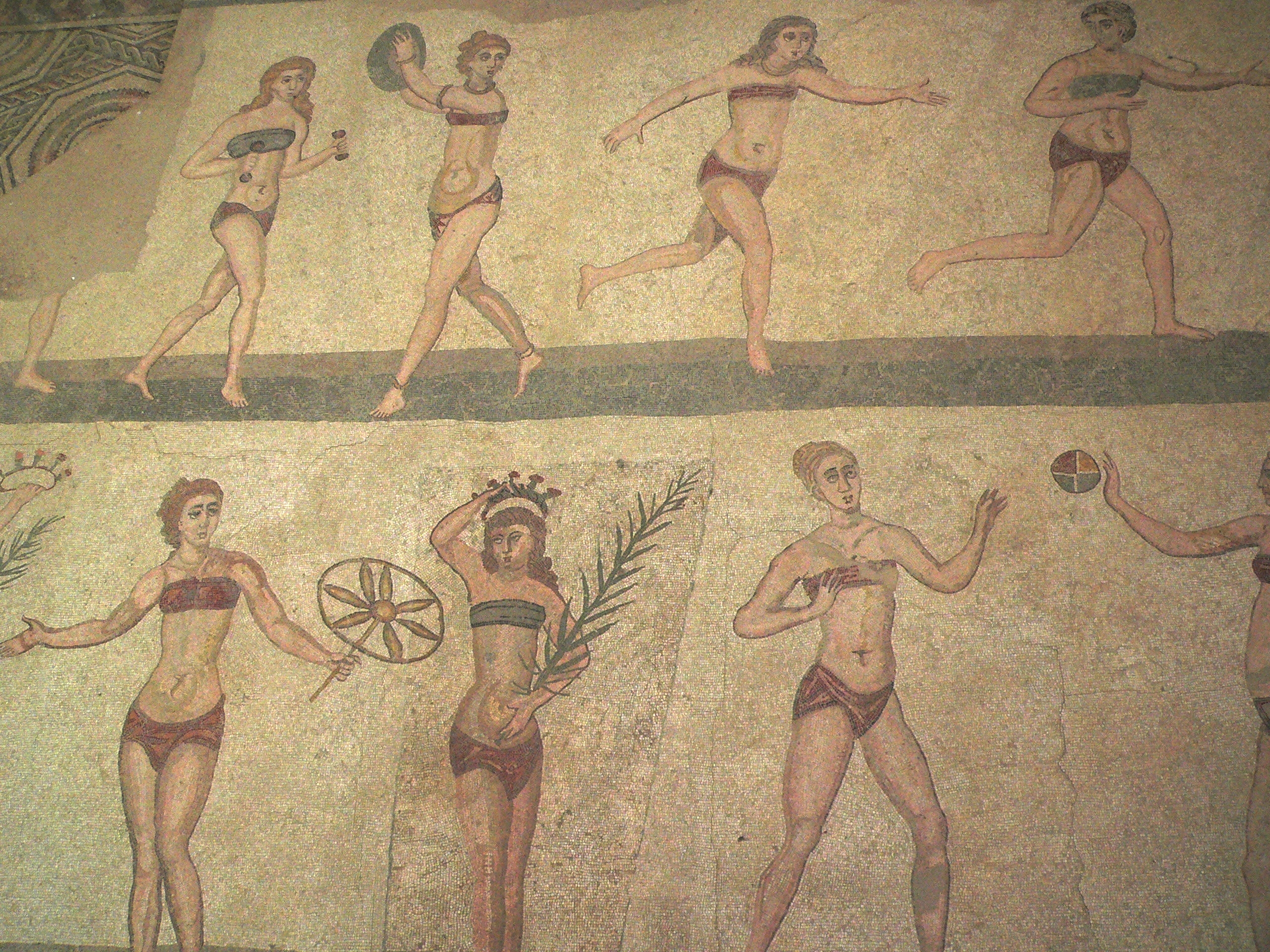
Mosaic showing Roman women in various recreational activities

Wealthy women traveled around the city in a litter carried by slaves. Women gathered on a daily basis to meet with friends, attend religious rites at temples, or to visit the baths. The wealthiest families had private baths at home, but most people went to bath houses not only to wash but to socialize, as the larger facilities offered a range of services and recreational activities, among which casual sex was not excluded. One of the most vexed questions of Roman social life is whether the sexes bathed together in public. Until the late Republic, evidence suggests that women usually bathed in a separate wing or facility, or that women and men were scheduled at different times. But there is also clear evidence of mixed bathing from the late Republic until the rise of Christian dominance in the later Empire. Some scholars have thought that only lower-class women bathed with men, or those of dubious moral standing such as entertainers or prostitutes, but Clement of Alexandria observed that women of the highest social classes could be seen naked at the baths. Hadrian prohibited mixed bathing, but the ban seems not to have endured. Most likely, customs varied not only by time and place, but by facility, so that women could choose to segregate themselves by gender or not.

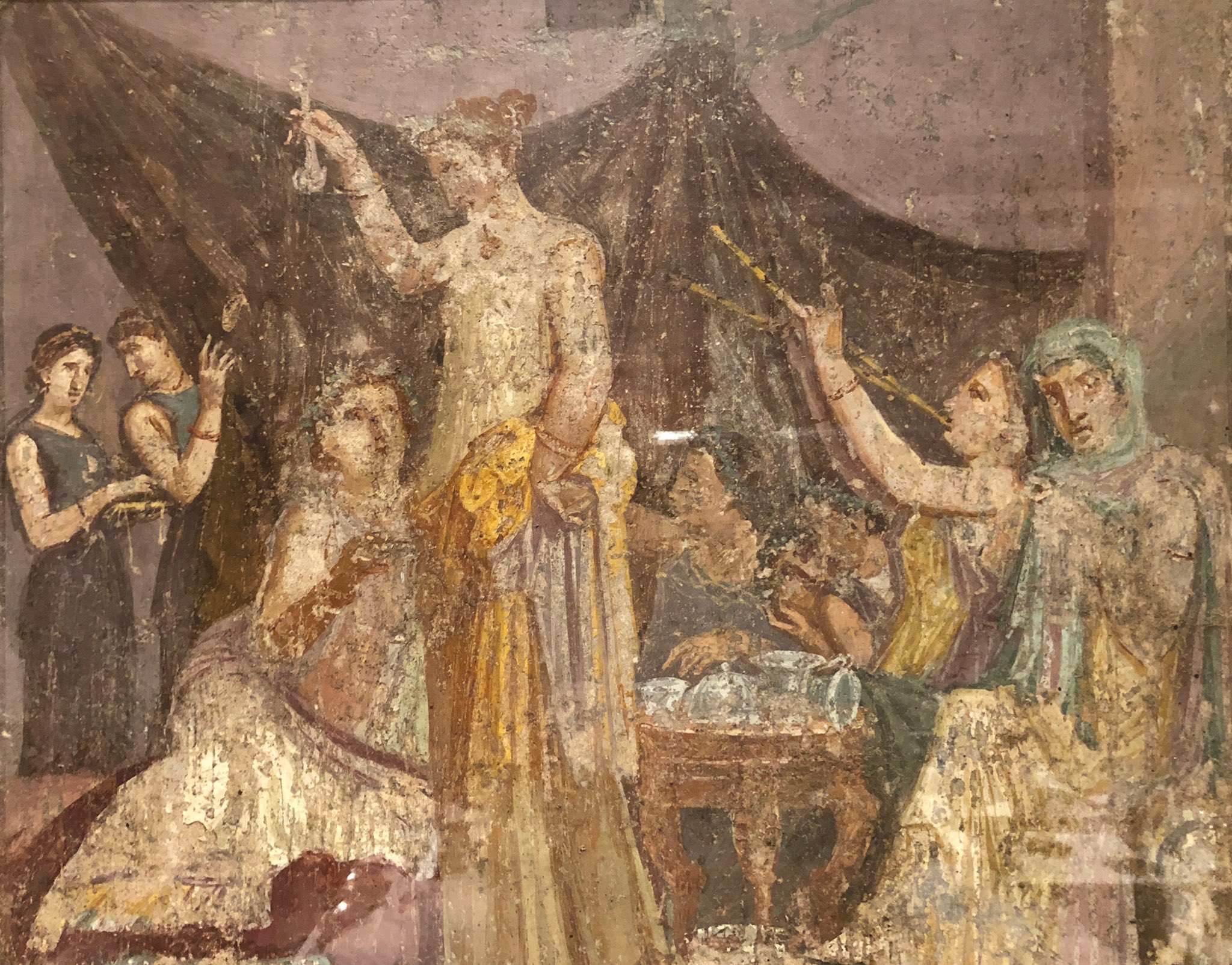
An all-women dinner party depicted on a wall painting from Pompeii

For entertainment women could attend debates at the Forum, the public games (ludi), chariot races, and theatrical performances. By the late Republic, they regularly attended dinner parties, though in earlier times the women of a household dined in private together. Conservatives such as Cato the Censor (234–149 BCE) considered it improper for women to take a more active role in public life; his complaints indicated that indeed some women did voice their opinions in the public sphere.

Roman generals would sometimes take their wives with them on military campaigns, though the practice was discouraged. Caligula's mother Agrippina the Elder often accompanied her husband Germanicus on his campaigns in northern Germania, and the future emperor Claudius was born in Gaul for this reason. Wealthy women might tour the empire, often participating in or viewing local religious ceremonies or entertainments appropriate to their class and background at sites around the empire. Rich women traveled to the countryside during the summer when Rome became too hot.

In works of Roman comedy, women are characterized by a style of speech known as blanditiae ("flattering," "caressing"), and this stereotype is explicitly described by the 4th-century grammarian Aelius Donatus. who writes that it is "characteristic of women when they speak either to please others or to pity themselves." Donatus explicitly cites phrases such as the usage of amabo ("I will love") as a modifier, the emphatic possessives mi or mea, and addressing others by their proper names as features of this stereotypically feminine style of speaking. Linguistic data from the works of Plautus and Terence confirms Donatus's assessment, at least amongst these portrayals of female characters by male authors. For example, the word amabo occurs only ten times in the writings of Terence, where it is exclusively utilized by maidservants and courtesans. This word functions to soften the intensity of commands or questions, and it portrays the speaker as more humble and modest. In the play Eunuchus by Terence, when the character of Thais tries to beg Phaedria to offer his assistance, she addresses him in such a demure manner, stating "be a darling and help me" ("id amabo adiuta me"). Yet, women did not necessarily speak in such a fashion at all times, even within Roman comedy. In the Plautine comedy Casina, the characters of Myrrhina and Cleostrata, when speaking with each other, forgo the conventional mannerisms and politeness with which they address men. Myrrhina, for example, tells Cleostrata to shut up and even calls her stupid, though both characters nevertheless still utilize feminine speech markers such as amabo. Within the broader context of the scene, Cleostrata is complaining about her husband's affair with one of their slave girls, to which Myrrhina replies, "please, be quiet." In response, Cleostrata explicitly acknowledges that the women are permitted to adjust their register since they are alone together.

=== Attire and adornment ===
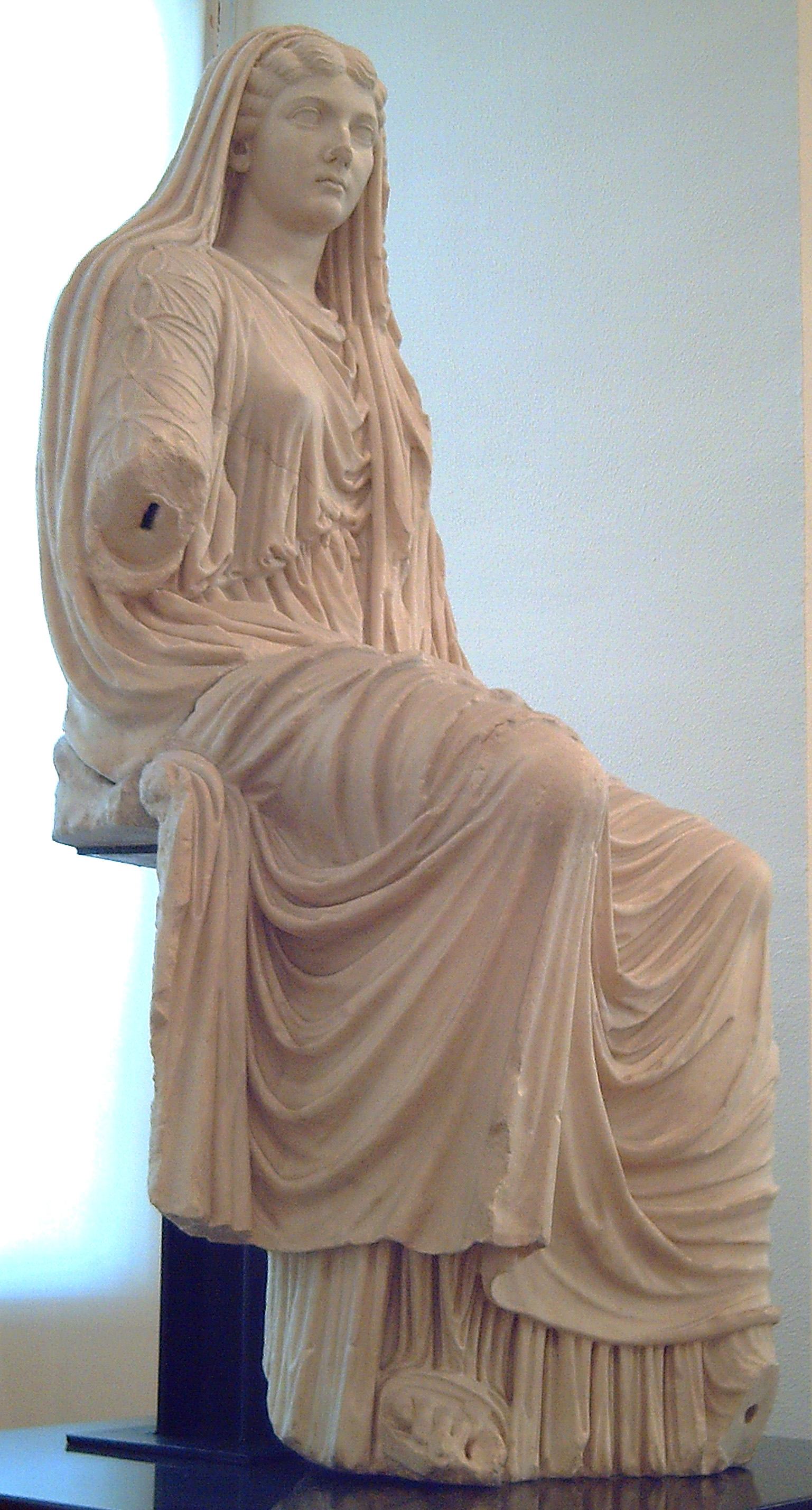
Livia attired in a stola and palla

Women in ancient Rome took great care in their appearance, though extravagance was frowned upon. They wore cosmetics and made different concoctions for their skin. Ovid even wrote a poem about the correct application of makeup. Women used white chalk or arsenic to whiten their faces, or rouge made of lead or carmine to add color to their cheeks as well as using lead to highlight their eyes. They spent much time arranging their hair and often dyed it black, red, or blonde. They also wore wigs regularly.

Matrons usually wore two simple tunics for undergarments covered by a stola. The stola was a long white dress that was cinched at the waist and which fell to the wearer’s feet, secured by clasps at the shoulder. Wealthier women would decorate their stola further. When going out a woman wore a palla over her stola, which was held by a clasp at the shoulder. Young women were not permitted to wear a stola, and instead wore tunics. Prostitutes and those caught committing adultery put on the male toga. Wealthy women wore jewels such as emeralds, aquamarine, opal, and pearls as earrings, necklaces, rings and sometimes sewn onto their shoes and clothing.

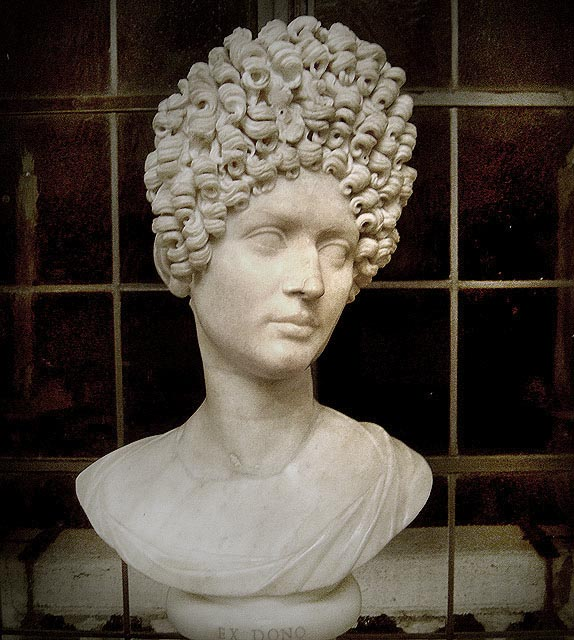
Exaggerated hairstyle of the Flavian period (80s–90s CE)

In the aftermath of Roman defeat at Cannae, economic crisis provoked the passing of the Lex Oppia (215 BCE) to restrict personal and public extravagance. The law limited women's possession and display of gold and silver (as money or personal ornament), expensive clothing and their "unnecessary" use of chariots and litters. Victory over Carthage flooded Rome with wealth and in 195 BCE the Lex Oppia was reviewed. The ruling consul, Cato the Censor argued for its retention: personal morality and self-restraint were self-evidently inadequate controls on indulgence and luxury. Luxury provoked the envy and shame of those less well-off, and was therefore divisive. Roman women, in Cato's view, had shown only too clearly that their appetites once corrupted knew no limits, and must be restrained. Large numbers of Roman matrons thought otherwise, and made concerted public protest. In 193 BCE the laws were abolished: Cato's opposition did not harm his political career. Later, in 42 BCE, Roman women, led by Hortensia, successfully protested against laws designed to tax Roman women, by use of the argument of no taxation without representation. Evidence of a lessening on luxury restrictions can also be found; one of the Letters of Pliny is addressed to the woman Pompeia Celerina praising the luxuries she keeps in her villa.

==== Body image ====
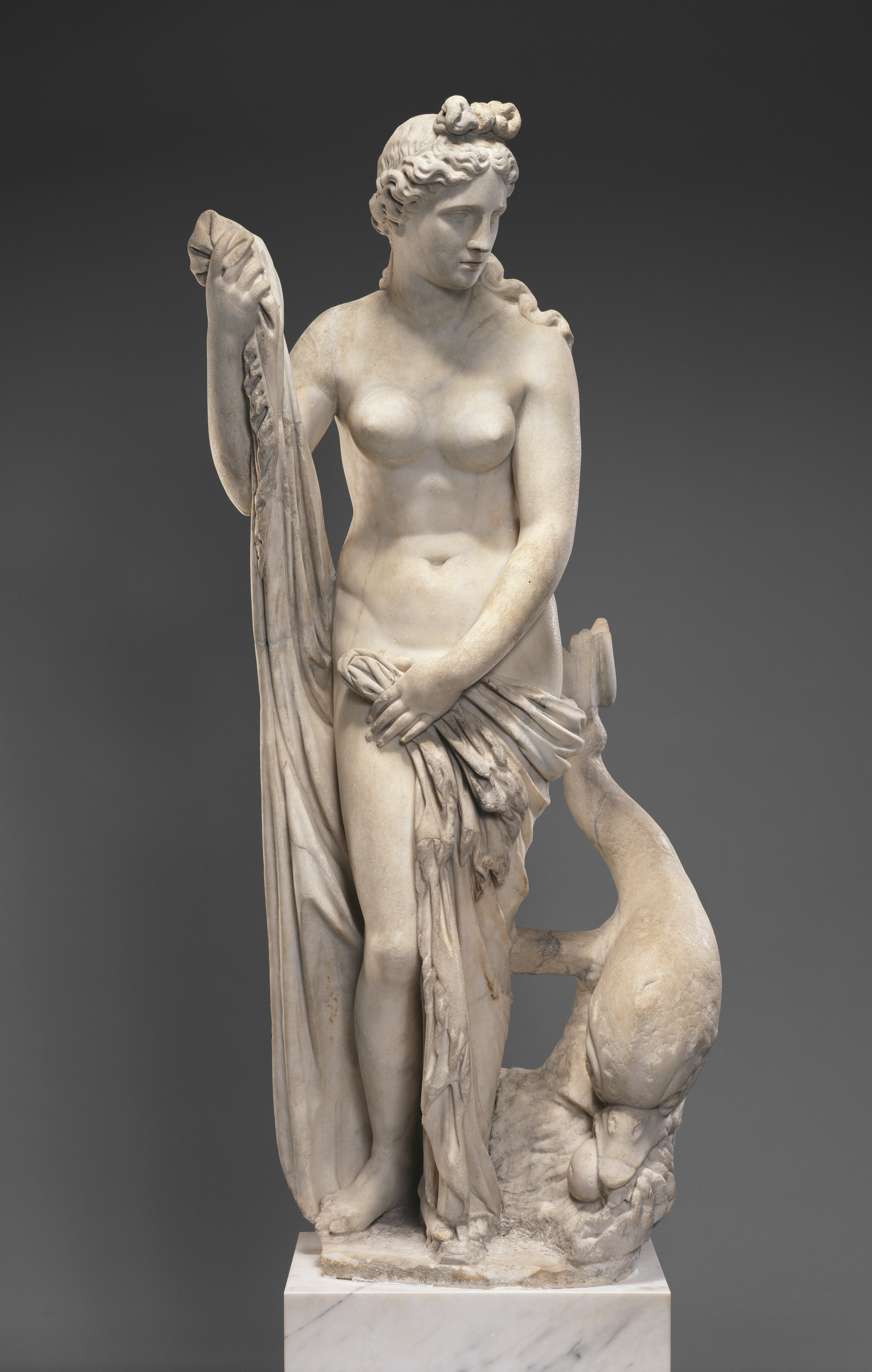
Venus, goddess of beauty and love (2nd century)

Based on Roman art and literature, small breasts and wide hips were the ideal body type for women considered alluring by Roman men. Roman art from the Augustan period shows idealized women as substantial and fleshy, with a full abdomen and breasts that are rounded, not pendulous. Prostitutes depicted in Roman erotic art have fleshy bodies and wide hips, and often have their breasts covered by a strophium (a sort of strapless bra) even when otherwise nude and performing sex acts. Large breasts were mocked as humorous or a sign of old age. Young girls wore a strophium secured tightly in the belief that it would inhibit the growth of breasts, and a regimen of massaging the breasts with hemlock, begun while a woman was still a virgin, was thought to prevent sagging. Breasts receive relatively minimal attention in erotic art and literature as a sexual focus; the breast was associated primarily with nursing infants and a woman's role as a mother. In times of extreme emotional duress, such as mourning or captivity in wartime, women might bare their breasts as an apotropaic gesture.

=== Mos maiorum and the love poets ===
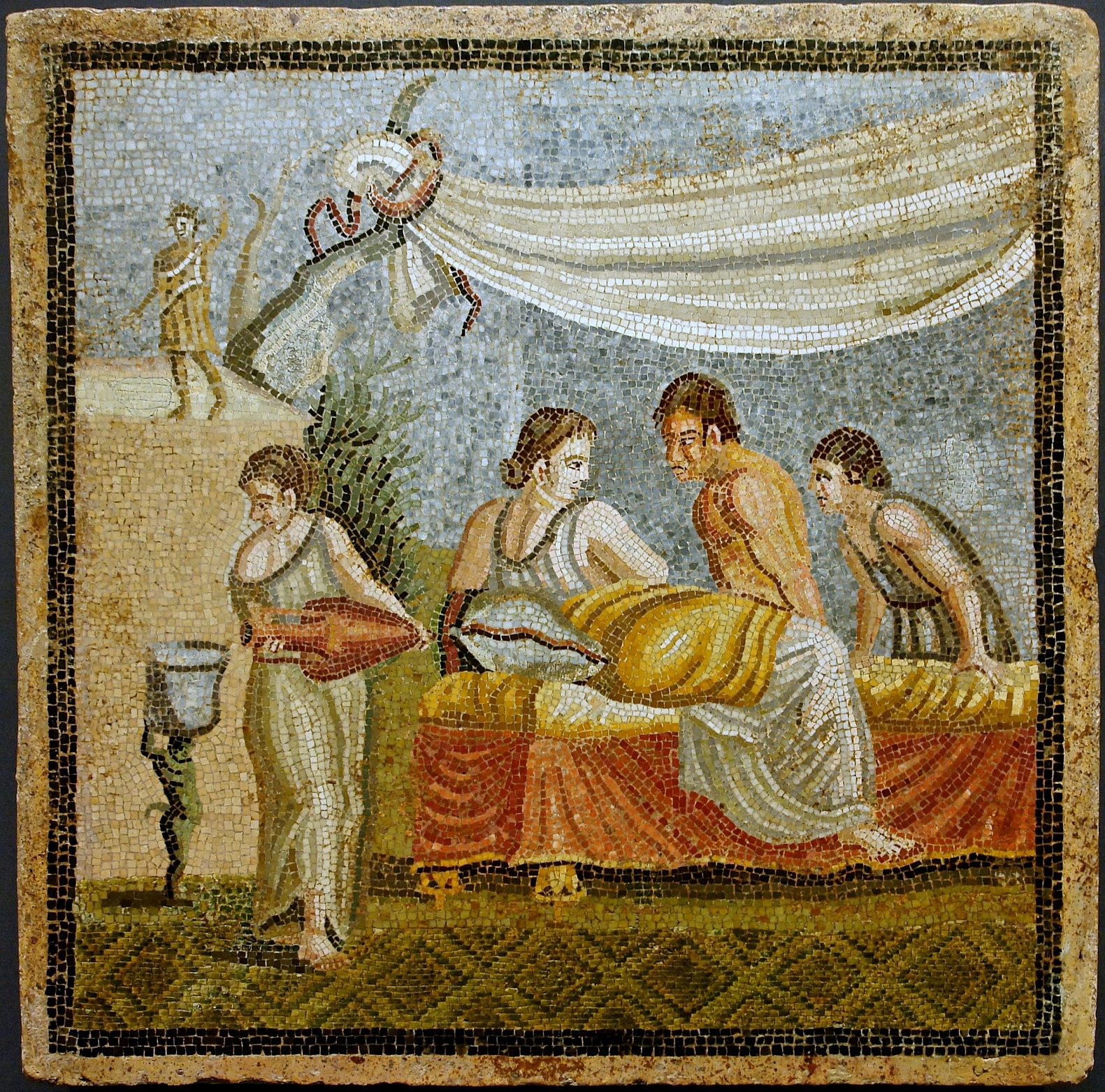
Romantic scene from a mosaic (Villa at Centocelle, Rome, 20 BCE–20 CE)

During the late Republic penalties for sexuality were barely enforced if at all, and a new erotic ideal of romantic relationship emerges. Subverting the tradition of male dominance, the love poets of the late Republic and Augustan era declared their eagerness to submit to "love slavery" (servitium amoris). Catullus addresses a number of poems to "Lesbia", a married woman with whom he has an affair, usually identified as a fictionalized Clodia, sister of the prominent popularist politician Clodius Pulcher. The affair ends badly, and Catullus's declarations of love turn to attacks on her sexual appetites—rhetoric that accords with the other hostile source on Clodia's behavior, Cicero's Pro Caelio.

In The Art of Love, Ovid goes a step further, adopting the genre of didactic poetry for offering instruction in how to pursue, keep, and get over a lover. Satirists such as Juvenal complain about the dissolute behavior of women.

=== Gynecology and medicine ===
The practices and views in the Hippocratic Corpus regarding women's bodies and their perceived weaknesses were inadequate for addressing the needs of women in the Hellenistic and Roman eras, when women led active lives and more often engaged in family planning. The physiology of women began to be seen as less alien to that of men. In the older tradition, intercourse, pregnancy, and childbirth were not only central to women's health, but the raison d'être for female physiology; men, by contrast, were advised to exercise moderation in their sexual behavior, since hypersexuality would cause disease and fatigue.

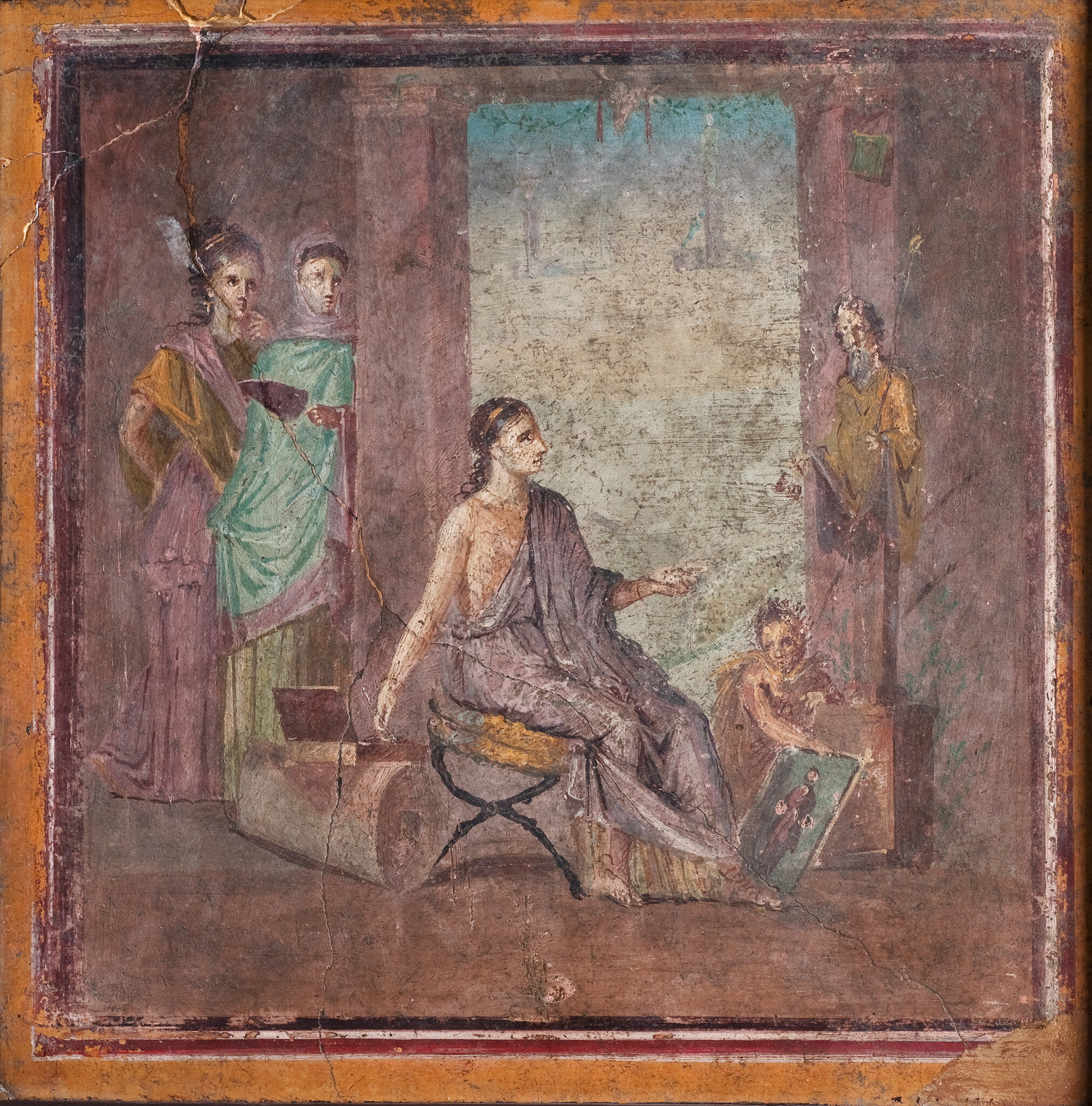
A female artist paints a statue of the phallic god Priapus, fresco from Pompeii, 1st c. AD

The Hippocratic view that amenorrhea was fatal became by Roman times a specific issue of infertility, and was recognized by most Roman medical writers as a likely result when women engage in intensive physical regimens for extended periods of time. Balancing food, exercise, and sexual activity came to be regarded as a choice that women might make. The observation that intensive training was likely to result in amenorrhea implies that there were women who engaged in such regimens.

In the Roman era, medical writers saw a place for exercise in the lives of women in sickness and health. Soranus recommends playing ball, swimming, walking, reading aloud, riding in vehicles, and travel as recreation, which would promote overall good health. In examining the causes of undesired childlessness, these later gynecological writers include information about sterility in men, rather than assuming some defect in the woman only.

Hypersexuality was to be avoided by women as well as men. An enlarged clitoris, like an oversized phallus, was considered a symptom of excessive sexuality. Although Hellenistic and Roman medical and other writers refer to clitoridectomy as primarily an "Egyptian" custom, gynecological manuals under the Christian Empire in late antiquity propose that hypersexuality could be treated by surgery or repeated childbirth.

== Slavery ==
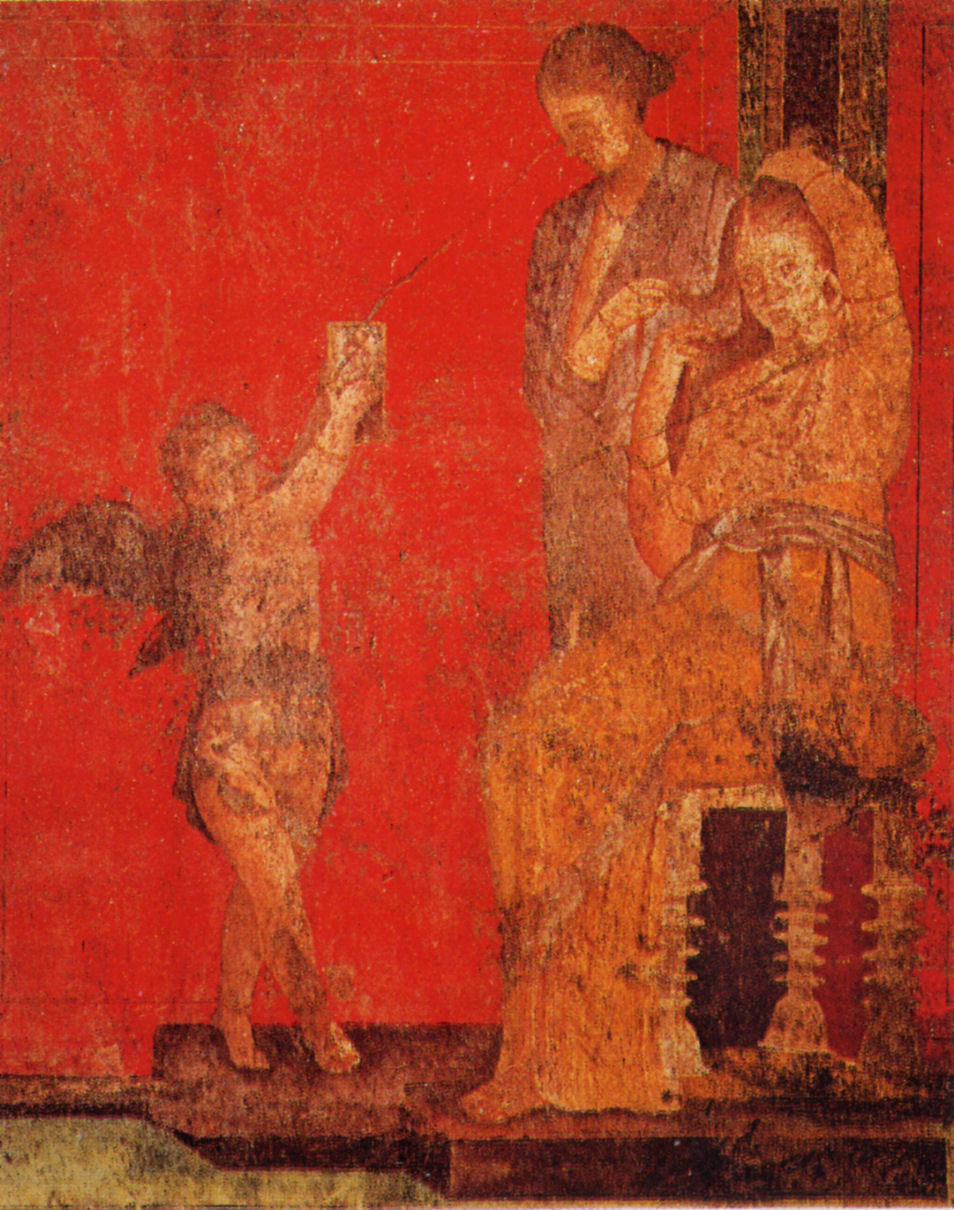
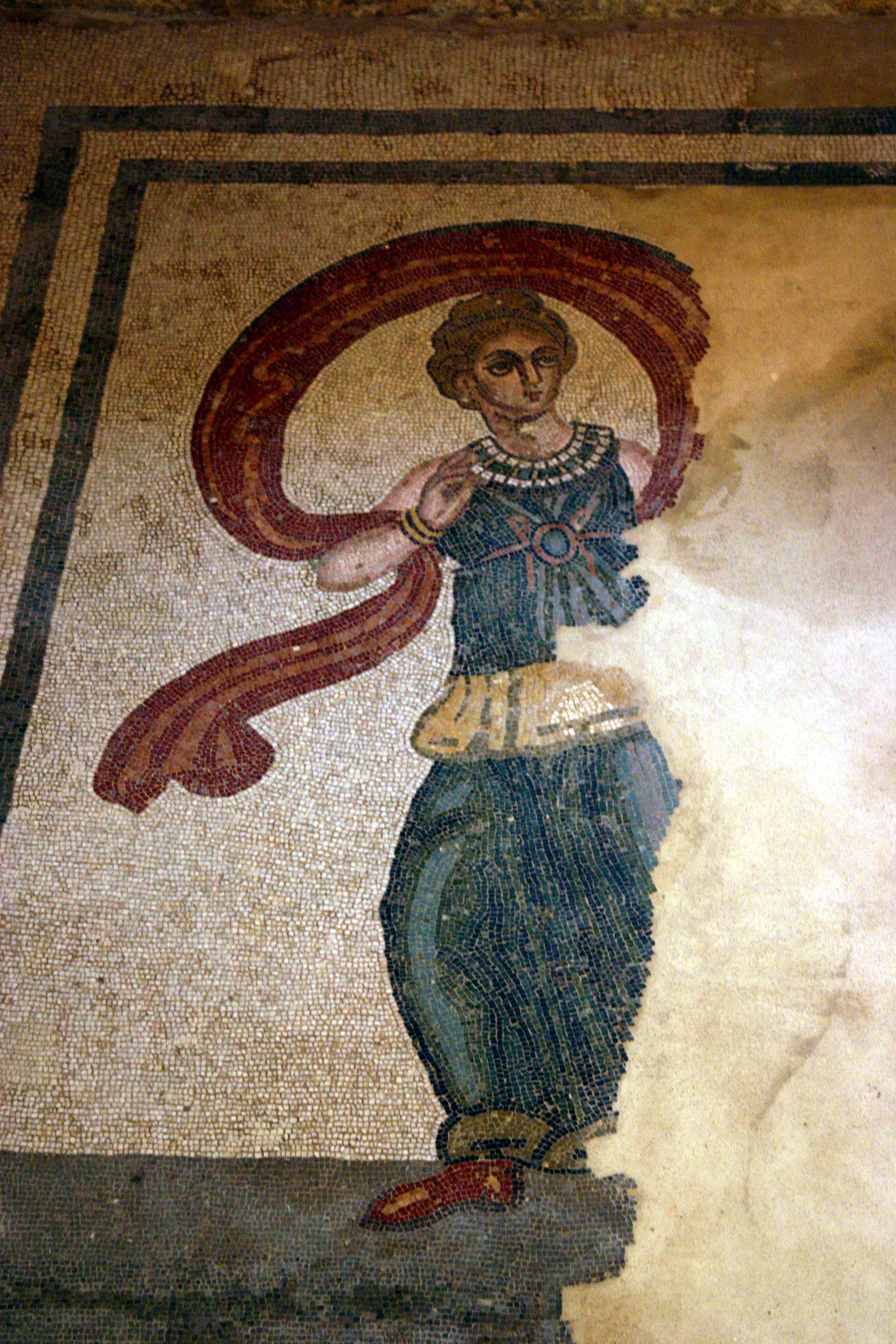
Left image: A young woman sits while a servant fixes her hair with the help of a cupid, who holds up a mirror to offer a reflection, detail of a fresco from the Villa of the Mysteries, Pompeii, c. 50 BC
Right image: A floor mosaic of a woman dancer from the Villa Romana del Casale, 4th century AD

Freedwomen were manumitted slaves. A freed slave owed a period of service, the terms of which might be agreed upon as a precondition of freedom, to her former owner, who became her patron. The patron had obligations in return, such as paying for said services and helping in legal matters. The patron-client relationship was one of the fundamental social structures of ancient Rome, and failure to fulfill one's obligations brought disapproval and censure.

In most ways, freedwomen had the same legal status as freeborn women. But because under Roman law a slave had no father, freed slaves had no inheritance rights unless they were named in a will.

The relationship of a former slave to her patron could be complicated. In one legal case, a woman named Petronia Iusta attempted to show—without a birth declaration to prove it—that she had been free-born. Her mother, she acknowledged, had been a slave in the household of Petronius Stephanus and Calatoria Themis, but Iusta maintained that she had been born after her mother's manumission. Calatoria, by now a widow, in turn argued that Iusta was born before her mother was free and that she had been manumitted, therefore owing her former owner the service due a patron. Calatoria could produce no documentation of this supposed manumission, and the case came down to the testimony of witnesses.

The status of freedwomen, like freedmen, varied widely. Caenis was a freedwoman and secretary to the Emperor Vespasian; she was also his concubine. He is said to have lived with her faithfully, but she was not considered a wife.

== Prostitution ==
Women could turn to prostitution to support themselves, but not all prostitutes had freedom to decide. There is some evidence that even slave prostitutes could benefit from their labor. Although rape was a crime, the law only punished the rape of a slave if it "damaged the goods", because a slave had no legal standing. The penalty was aimed at providing her owner compensation for the "damage" of his property. Because a slave woman was considered property under Roman law, forcing her to be a prostitute was not considered a crime. Prior to Septimius Severus, women who engaged in acts that brought infamia to them as slaves also suffered infamia when freed. Sometimes sellers of female slaves attached a ne serva clause to the slave to prevent her from being prostituted. The Ne Serva clause meant that if the new owner or any owner after him or her used the slave as a prostitute she would be free. Later on the ne serva agreements became enforceable by law. Prostitution was not limited to slaves or poor citizens; according to Suetonius, Caligula, when converting his palace into a brothel, employed upper class "matrons and youths" as prostitutes. Tacitus records that during one of Nero's feasts the prefect Tigellinus had brothels filled with upper class women. Prostitution could also be a punishment instead of an occupation; a law of Augustus allowed that women guilty of adultery could be sentenced to work in brothels as prostitutes. The law was abolished in 389.

== See also ==
- List of Roman women
- List of Roman birth and childhood deities
- List of archaeologically attested women from the ancient Mediterranean region
- Sexuality in ancient Rome
- Women in ancient Sparta
- Women in Classical Athens
- Women in ancient warfare
- Women in the Etruscan society

== Bibliography ==
- Assa, Janine (1960). The Great Roman Ladies. New York: Grove Press.
- Bruce W. Frier, Thomas A. J. McGinn (2004). A casebook on Roman family law. Oxford University Press. ISBN 0-19-516186-6.
- Daehner, Jens (ed.), The Herculaneum Women: History, Context, Identities (Los Angeles: The J. Paul Getty Museum, 2007), Pp. xiv, 178.
- Dutsch, Dorota M. (2008-08-07). "Feminine Discourse in Roman Comedy: On Echoes and Voices". OUP Academic. doi:10.1093/acprof:o. ISBN 9780191714757.
- Freisenbruch, Annelise (2010). The First Ladies of Rome: the Women behind the Caesars. London: Jonathan Cape.
- Gardner, Jane F. 1986. Women in Roman Law and Society. Croom Helm
- Gold, Barbara K. (2020), "The Wife in Charge, the Husband Humiliated", A Companion to Plautus, John Wiley & Sons, Ltd, pp. 165–178, doi:10.1002/9781118958018.ch11, ISBN 978-1-118-95801-8
- Hallett, Judith P. (1984). Fathers and daughters in Roman society: women and the elite family. Princeton, N.J.: Princeton University Press. ISBN 0-691-03570-9.
- Spaeth, Barbette Stanley. The Roman goddess Ceres, University of Texas Press, 1996.
