= Sabbath stew =

Traditional Jewish dish consumed on Saturday

Sabbath stew was developed over the centuries to conform with Jewish laws that prohibit cooking on the Sabbath. The pot is brought to a boil on Friday before the Sabbath begins, and sometimes kept on a blech or hotplate, or left in a slow oven or electric slow cooker, until the following day.

Two of the best known sabbath stews are hamin, a Sephardic dish that emerged in Spain, and cholent, an Ashkenazi dish derived from hamin that emerged later in France. Both dishes are based on a mixture of whole grains, meat, beans and potatoes.

Both stews are ultimately derived from harisa, a more simplistic, traditional Middle Eastern porridge consisting of just cracked durum wheat berries and meat. Over the centuries various Jewish diaspora communities created their own variations of the dish based on local food resources and neighborhood influence.

There are many variations on sabbath stews, which are today staples of both the Sephardi and Ashkenazi kitchens and other communities. The slow overnight cooking allows the flavors of the various ingredients to permeate and produces the characteristic taste of each local stew.

== Background and origins ==
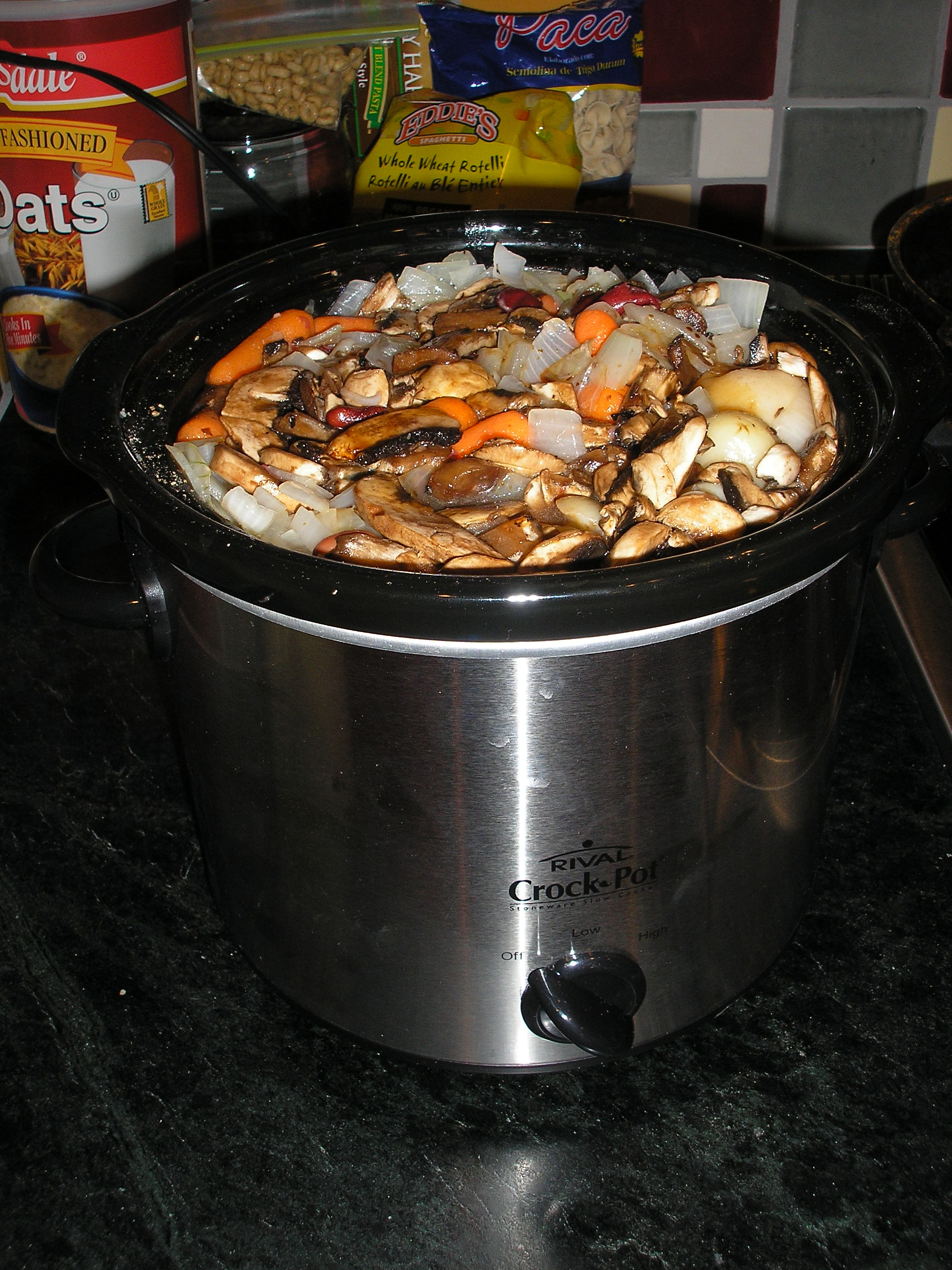
Vegetable cholent assembled in a slow cooker before Shabbat

In traditional Ashkenazi, Sephardi, and Mizrahi families, stew is the hot main course of the midday Shabbat meal served on Saturdays, typically after the morning synagogue services for practicing Jews. Secular Jewish families also serve stews like cholent or eat them in Israeli restaurants. For practicing Jews, lighting a fire and cooking food are among the activities prohibited on Shabbat by the written Torah. Therefore, cooked Shabbat food must be prepared before the onset of the Jewish Shabbat at sunset Friday night.

=== Basis in religious tradition ===
Very little documentation of Jewish diet before the 6th century exists except in small circles and the scriptures from the Torah. Around the reign of King Herod in the first century BCE, a divergence in scholarship led to three practices of halacha: the Pharisees, Sadducees, and the Essenes. Modern Jews claim descent from the Pharisees as the strictest observation of halacha. After the destruction of the 2nd Temple, Rabbinical authorities began to work on the Mishnah to preserve Oral Law in an attempt to remain unified on halachic rulings. The Karaites often disagreed with Rabbinic rulings like the kosher status of chickens and eggs or whether fire is allowed to burn during shabbat leading to avoidance of candle light the entire day. This stems from the verse "You shall not [burn] (Heb: bi'er the pi'el form of ba'ar) a fire in any of your dwellings on the day of Shabbat." Rabbinic Judaism however, the qal verb form ba'ar is understood to mean "burn", whereas the pi'el form (present here) is understood to be not intensive but causative. (The rule being that the pi'el of a stative verb will be causative, instead of the usual hif'il.) Hence bi'er means "kindle", which is why Rabbinic Judaism prohibits only starting a fire on Shabbat. Historian Aaron Gross proposes this caused a rise in popularity of shabbat stews as a hot meal.

== History ==
As the Jewish diaspora grew with Jewish migrations into Europe, North Africa, and elsewhere in the Middle East and Central Asia, Jewish diaspora communities developed different Sabbath stews and other foodstuffs based on the local climate, available ingredients and local influence.

=== Early traces ===
Jews living in Israel before the destruction of the Second Temple likely ate the Mediterranean Triad: grain, oil and wine, which were available at low cost and vast amounts. While both wheat and barley were grown in Israel, barley was more likely to supplement the inland. Cooper argues wheat would have been twice as expensive as barley which could grow in rougher soils closer to Jerusalem. Barley could also be harvested earlier ensuring multiple crops in the same season.

Meats were considered "luxury" goods that few could afford except on special occasions like shabbat and other holidays. Lambs and goats would have been popular as they grazed in arid climates and provided supplementary products like wool and milk while cattle were more expensive to maintain and priced as sacrificial.

Shabbat stews of the Bukharian Jews and Mizrahi Jews in the Asian Central Steppe who trace their diaspora to Babylonian exile have the most distinct versions of shabbat stews that relate closest to their non-Jewish neighbors and often resembled the closest proposed ingredients and methods to the original harisa.

=== Harisa ===
Harisa is mentioned by Ibn Al Karim in Kitab Al-Tabikh as early as the seventh century. In the anecdotal cookbook, the Umayyad Caliph, Mu'awiya, returns from a trip to Arabia after returning to his newly won Persian lands. In some versions of the story, Mu'awiya is met with some Yemenite Jews whom he asks to prepare the porridge he tasted abroad while in other versions, he approaches locals. This story should be taken with a grain of salt as the author penned the story three centuries after it supposedly occurred. At the very least, harisa was prevalent as a Levantine dish.

=== Hamin ===
Hamin emerged as a dish when Sephardic chefs began to experiment with adding chickpeas or beans and more water to harisa, a traditional Middle Eastern porridge of cracked durum wheat berries, to create a more liquidy bean stew. The basic ingredients of Sephardic Sabbath stews were Whole grains, meat, beans, potatoes, but the exact recipe varied from place to place and season to season.

After the Reconquista and expulsion, Jewish conversos in Spain hid their hamin pots under the fire embers to avoid persecution and exposure of Jewish practices, leading to the name dafina, meaning buried, for the dish.

The ingredients of hamin changed again in the 14th century, as famine in Northern Europe caused a fall in cattle rearing and increase in chicken and egg production, leading to huevos haminados to be introduced to the Sephardic Sabbath stew.

Following the 1492 expulsion of the Jews from Spain, hamin adapted to other local ingredients and seasonings, incorporating spices such as cinnamon, paprika, saffron and turmeric. The influx of new ingredients from South America in the 16th century meanwhile resulted in white beans often substituting fava beans, and white potatoes, sweet potatoes, pumpkin and red chillies being added in some recipes.

=== Cholent ===
The origins of cholent date back to the 11th century, when the Christian Reconquista of Al-Andalus or Islamic Spain, when culinary techniques from the Moorish period spread northwards into Europe through Provence. In the late 12th or early 13th century, the Sephardic Sabbath stew known as hamin became a part of the traditions of the Jews of France.

By the 13th century, the stew is described as having become widespread in Bohemia and Germany. Originally made with fava beans, the cholent of the French Ashkenazi was substituted with dried haricot beans from the Americas in the sixteenth century. Since then, white beans, red kidney beans, pinto beans and dried lima beans have all become common ingredients. Some Romanians add chickpeas in "a remnant of the Sephardic influence due to Ottoman control of the area".

== "Blech" cooking ==
The slow warming of the embers inspired an extra layer of precaution to the prohibition of cooking on shabbat, the Blech. The blech covers a fire or modern stovetops to prevent cooking while allowing heat to transfer from one item to another indirectly as a warm source without "kindling". Hamin and cholent commonly use a blech, a cooking requirement that was later the inspiration for the invention of the slow cooker.

== Variations ==
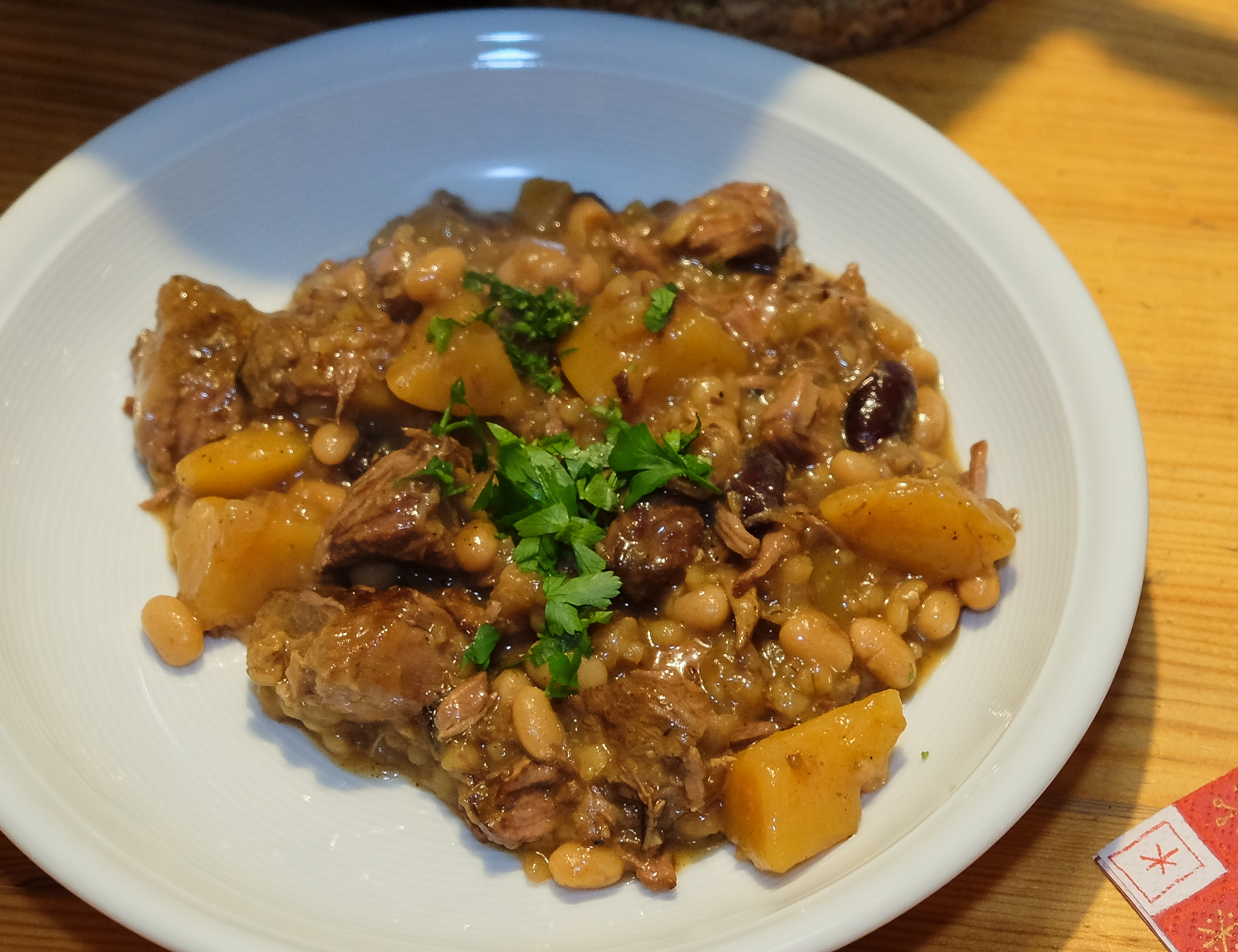
Cholent of beans and potatoes

=== Iraqi Jews ===
Among Iraqi Jews, the hot Shabbat stew is called t'bit and consists of whole chicken skin filled with a mixture of rice, chopped chicken meats, tomatoes and herbs. The stuffed chicken skin in t'bit is similar to the Ashkenazi helzel, chicken neck skin stuffed with a flour and onion mixture that often replaces (or supplements) the kishke in European cholent recipes.

=== North Africa ===
Ethiopian Jews traditionally eat a kosher version of doro wat on Shabbat called "Sanbat wat", a stew of chicken and hard-boiled eggs commonly seasoned with berber, cloves, onions, and other savory ingredients. It is traditionally served with injera similarly to challah with cholent. "Alicha wot", Amharic for "mild", features a vegetarian version without berbere.

In Egypt, "ferik" was used as a method of cooking harisa involving unripened, crushed wheat that gave the dish by the same name a unique green hue. Historians argue whether the ferik method was used before Sephardic migration after the 13th century since Jews did not live in Egypt in large numbers post-exodus until Spanish expulsion. Egyptian Jews did not regularly include meat in their mostly vegetarian diets though chicken was prevalent for Shabbat after the Sephardic diaspora.

=== North, Central and Eastern European ===
In Germany, the Netherlands, and other western European countries, cholent is known as schalet, shalent, or shalet.

In Italy, pasta is a common substitute for beans or rice in shabbat stews and is called "hamin macaron" when sampled in Iberia. The rise of Chassidism in the late 18th century popularized black beans in Eastern Europe as the Bal Shem Tov's favorite bean while Alastian Cholent in France featured lima beans.

=== North and South America ===
To honor the tradition of eggs in cholent, some American Jews long roast meatloaves for Friday night and place whole eggs to be peeled and eaten. The Kosher Cajun Cookbook features New Orleans style cajun food with kosher substitutes like gumbo and jambalaya. Puerto Rican hamin is considered a stewed "arroz con pollo."

== See also ==
- Boston baked beans, a slow-cooked stew developed by Christians to avoid working on the Christian Sabbath

== Bibliography ==
- Stein, Lori and Ronald H. Isaacs. Let’s Eat: Jewish Food and Faith. Lanham, Maryland: Rowman & Littlefield, 2018.
