= Simmering =

Cooking technique

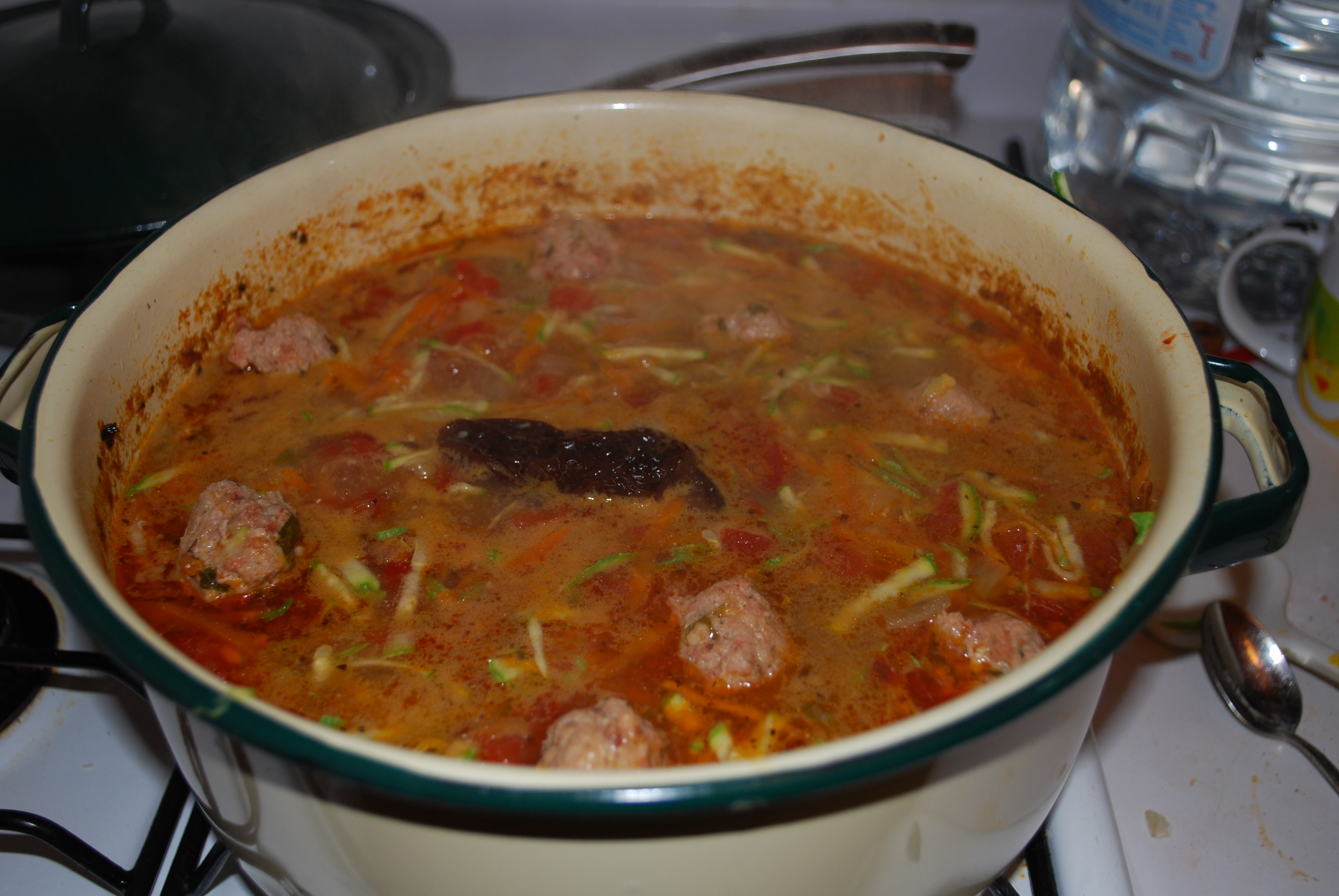
Meatball soup simmering on a stove

Simmering is a food preparation technique by which foods are cooked in hot liquids kept just below the boiling point of water (lower than 100 °C or 212 °F) and above poaching temperature (higher than 71–80 °C or 160–176 °F). To create a steady simmer, a liquid is brought to a boil, then its heat source is reduced to a lower, constant intensity (smaller flame on a gas stove, lower temperature on an induction/electric stove). While simmering, a liquid will show little movement without approaching a rolling boil.

== Methods and equipments ==
Simmering ensures gentler treatment than boiling to prevent food from toughening and/or breaking up. Simmering is usually a rapid and efficient method of cooking. Food that has simmered in milk or cream instead of water is sometimes referred to as creamed. The appropriate simmering temperature is a topic of debate among chefs, with some but not all considering that a simmer is as low as 82 °C or 180 °F.

Some modern gas ranges have a simmering burner, which may be a rear burner, supporting a steady low heat. Many electric ranges have a simmer setting.

Slow cookers are countertop electrical appliances used to cook foods at simmering temperature or somewhat lower for hours at a time.

== By cuisine ==
=== Japanese cuisine ===
In Japanese cuisine, simmering is often considered one of the four essential cooking techniques, along with grilling, steaming, and deep frying.

=== International cuisine ===
Food prepared in a crockpot or slow cooker is simmered. Examples include stews, chili con carne, soups, etc.

=== Bulgarian cuisine ===
Bulgarian traditional food, especially tender meat dishes, are often simmered for extended periods of time. Examples include stews, soups, Vanyas, etc.

=== Dutch and Flemish cuisine ===
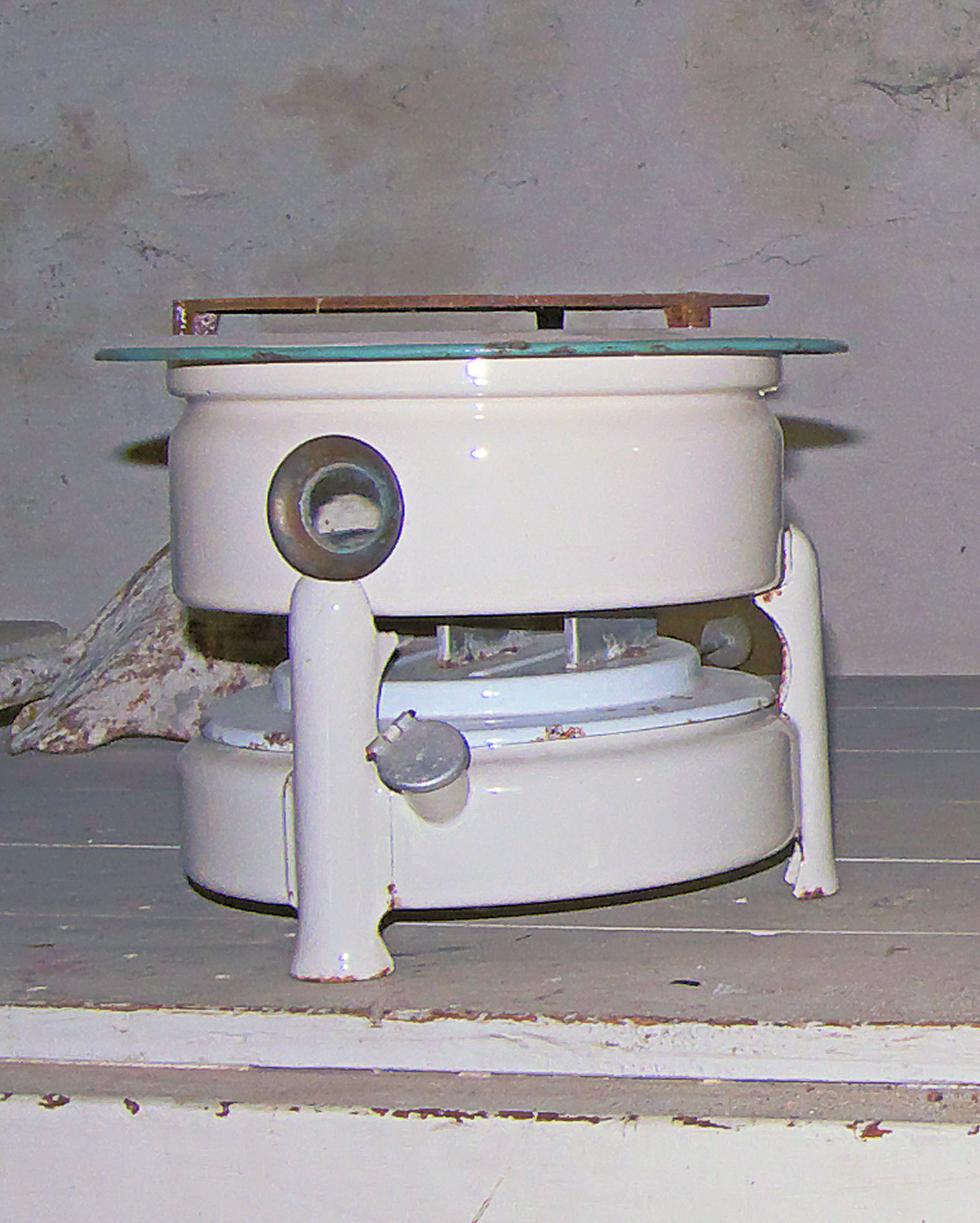
Typical Dutch burner for simmering meat

In traditional Dutch and Flemish cuisine, less tender cuts of beef are simmered for several hours to obtain carbonade flamande. Traditionally, a small flame is used, fed by burning oil, or a very low gas flame on a cooker. A cast iron pan with a thick bottom is often used in many countries. The meat is ready if it can be easily torn apart into threads.

=== Persian cuisine ===
Simmering is one of the most popular styles of cooking in Iran and Afghanistan. In traditional Persian cuisine, almost all types of Persian khoresh are simmered for several hours. That is also the case with some other Iranian dishes like abgoosht, bozbash, etc.

=== Jewish cuisine ===
Simmering is the main cooking technique used in Shabbat stews because by Jewish law the procedure of cooking is forbidden on Shabbat, from Friday evening to Saturday evening. Almost every Jewish diaspora group has different versions of sabbath stews, with the common practice of bringing to the boil before Sabbath begins and then keeping the pot on a blech covering the heat source, or other device, to heat the food. Many Shabbat dishes are simmered overnight, without intervention from the cook, to conform to Jewish law. Such dishes include cholent (Ashkenazi Jewish), hamin (Sepharadi Jewish) and t'bit (Iraqi Jewish).
