= Msoki =

Soup traditional to Algerian and Tunisian Jews

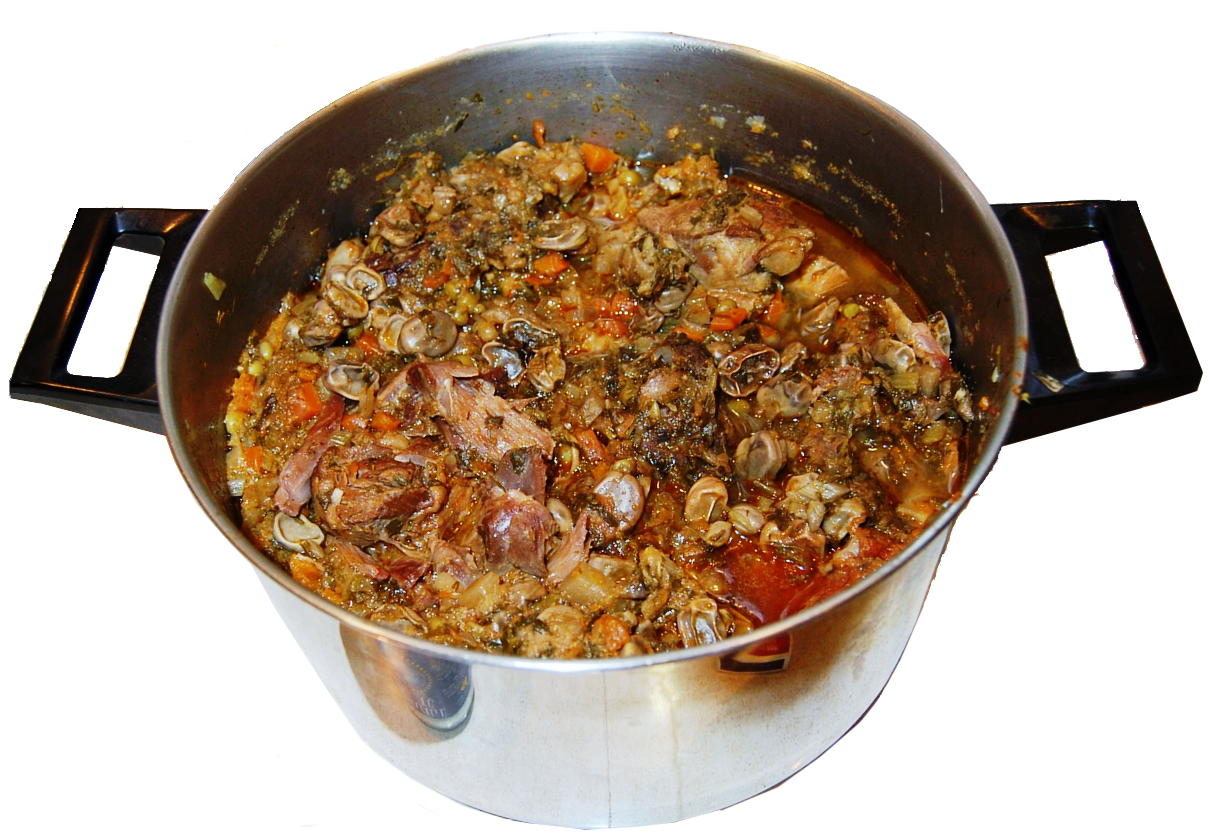
- Msoki
- Type: Soup
- Course: Main course
- Place of origin: Currently: Israel, France, Sephardi Jewish diaspora, formerly: Algeria and Tunisia
- Region or state: Maghreb
- Associated cuisine: Algerian and Tunisian Jewish
- Created by: Algerian Jews, Tunisian Jews
- Serving temperature: Hot
- Similar dishes: Chamin

Msoki (Hebrew: מסוקי) is a Jewish soup traditional to Algerian and Tunisian Jews, and is most often eaten during feasts and in most, during the celebration of Passover.

The soup contains, as is customary in some Tunisian communities, a selection of seasonal vegetables, lamb and matzah. It is common to say that the ingredients of the dish, lamb, matzah and vegetables, are against "Pesach, matzah and maror".
