= Hamin =

Sephardic Jewish Sabbath stew

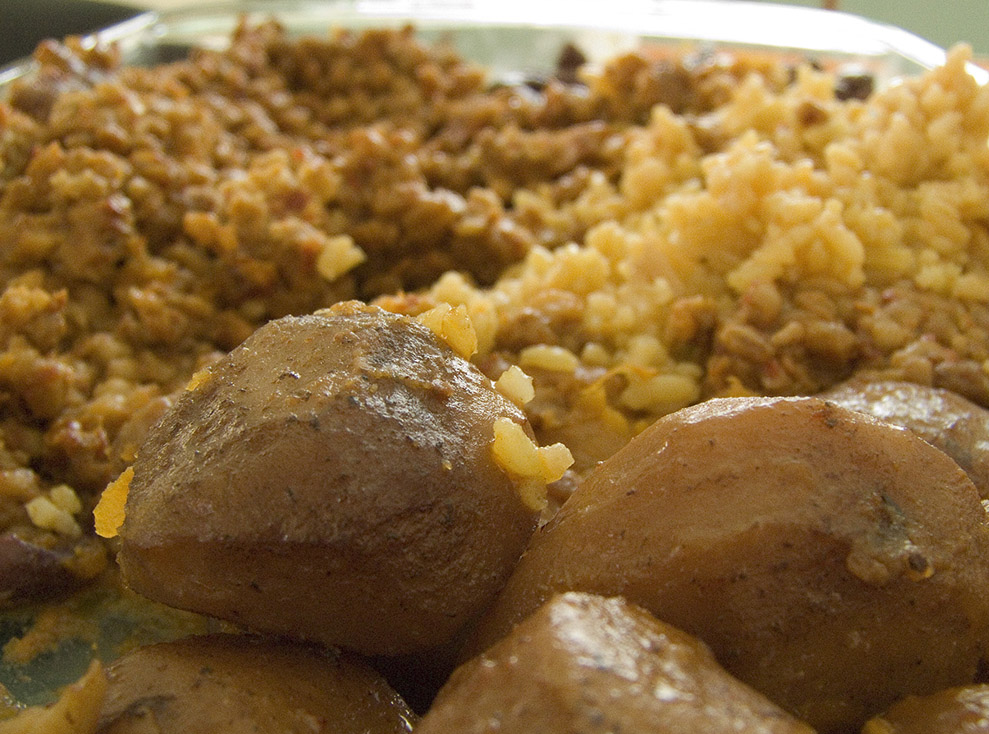
- Alternative names: Adafina, dafina, sakhina
- Type: Sabbath stew
- Place of origin: Spain
- Created by: Sephardic Jews
- Main ingredients: Whole grains, meat, beans, potatoes

Hamin or dafina is a Sabbath stew made from whole grains, cubes of meat, chickpeas or beans, onion and cumin that emerged in Iberia among Sephardic Jews. The dish was developed as Jewish chefs, perhaps first in Iberia, began adding chickpeas or fava beans and more water to harisa, a Middle Eastern porridge of cracked durum wheat berries and meat, to create a more liquidy bean stew. The similar Sabbath stew cholent was developed based on hamin by Ashkenazi Jews in Europe, first in France and later Germany.

== Etymology ==
The name hamin (חמין) is derived from the Hebrew word חם ('hot'), from which the Mishnaic word for warm things was derived, and eventually became a shorthand for the name of the Sephardic food hamin di trigo (lit. heat of grain). It was sometimes also called "trasnochado" ("overnighted" in Spanish). After the Reconquista in Spain, Iberian Jews hid their hamin pots under the fire embers to avoid persecution and exposure of Jewish practices, renaming the dish dafina (Arabic: دفينة), meaning buried, echoing the Mishnaic phrase "bury the hot food".

== Background ==
Sabbath stews were developed over the centuries to conform with Jewish laws that prohibit cooking on the Sabbath. The pot is brought to a boil on Friday before the Sabbath begins, and sometimes kept on a blech or hotplate, or left in a slow oven or electric slow cooker, until the following day. Over the centuries various Jewish diaspora communities created their own variations of Sabbath stew based on local food resources and neighborhood influence.

There are many variations of the dish, which is today a staple of both Sephardi and Ashkenazi kitchens and among other communities. The basic ingredients of hamin are generally whole grains, meat, beans and potatoes, while some stews also feature other vegetables. Slow overnight cooking allows the flavors of the various ingredients to permeate and produces the characteristic taste of each local stew.

== History ==
Hamin emerged as a dish when Sephardic chefs began to experiment with adding chickpeas or beans and more water to harisa, a traditional Middle Eastearn porridge of cracked durum wheat berries, to create a more liquidy bean stew. The basic ingredients of Sephardic Sabbath stews were whole grains, meat, beans, potatoes, but the exact recipe varied from place to place and season to season.

After the Reconquista and expulsion, Jewish conversos in Spain hid their hamin pots under the fire embers to avoid persecution and exposure of Jewish practices, leading to the name dafina, meaning buried, for the dish. Amid the Spanish Inquisition, hamin was the most incriminating dish for Iberian Jews to be caught cooking. Some conversos replaced the mutton with pork in order to consume hamin without risking arrest. This gave rise to two of Spain's classic dishes, cocido madrileño and olla podrida.

In the 13th century, olla podrida became a staple in mainstream Spanish cuisine as a porridge with vegetables, spices and meat, usually cattle. By the 14th century famine in Northern Europe caused a rise in cattle prices in Western Europe and North Africa, leading chicken rearing to overtake livestock production. The rise in chicken production and surplus of eggs gave rise to huevos haminados, eggs long-roasted overnight in hamin pots. Eggs later took on spiritual significance within Jewish culture.

Following the 1492 expulsion of the Jews from Spain, hamin adapted to other local ingredients and seasonings, incorporating spices such as cinnamon, paprika, saffron and turmeric. The influx of new ingredients from South America in the 16th century meanwhile resulted in white beans often substituting fava beans, and white potatoes, sweet potatoes, pumpkin and red chillies being added in some recipes.

== Variations ==
As Sephardic Jews dispersed, both the form and name of hamin changed. Sephardic Jews that went to Syria and India retained the name hamin, while those in the Balkans and Turkey adopted new names. Italian Jews made hamin with fava beans and alternatively lamb, beef steaks, beef brisket, chicken or beef meatballs and beet greens or chard. They also might add sage.

Romaniote Jews used large cuts of beef, onions and pligouri, a type of cracked bulgur wheat, while in Jerusalem, Jewish cooks added both potatoes and rice to the dish. Indian Jews added garam masala and ginger.

When Sephardic Jews arrived in North Africa, hamin was merged with native tagines, creating variations incorporating calves' hooves or kouclas, a type of dumpling, served with couscous. Cinnamon, nutmeg and ginger all became common spices in Moroccan variants, along with the addition of dates, honey or quince jam. These stews also contained whole eggs, or huevos haminados, simmered in their shells. The Moroccans dish sakhina/S'hina/skhena (سخينة), meaning "hot", is also a variation of hamin.

On Shabbat Beraisheet, the Sabbath after Sukkot, some communities prepare a seven-layer hamin with rice between each layer, and other special ingredients, including prunes, raisins, pumpkins, spinach and grape leaves.

== See also ==
- Cassoulet
- Cocido madrileño
- Jewish cuisine
  - Ashkenazi Jewish cuisine
  - Israeli cuisine
  - Sephardic Jewish cuisine
- Macaroni Hamin
- Ropa vieja
- Sabbath stew
  - Cholent
- Sabich
- Tza'ar ba'alei chayim
