= Tami Shem-Tov =

Israeli author (born 1969)

Tami Shem-Tov (Hebrew: תמי שם-טוב; born October 18, 1969) is an Israeli journalist and writer best known for her books for children.

== Books ==
Her books were translated into several languages.

- 2020: Hebrew: אני לא עוזב, I'm Not Leaving, a sequel to I'm Not a Thief
- 2017: (with Rachella Sandbank) Hebrew: הביתה, romanized: HaBaytah, Coming Home! (ages 4–8)
- 2017: Saba Sabich (Grandpa Sabich), a children's picture book published in 2017 by Kinneret Zmora-Bitan in Hebrew, which according to Yahil Zaban of Tel Aviv University details how the sandwich became "a symbol of the new Israeli culture".
- 2015: (with Rachella Sandbank) Queen of Jerusalem (a story of Bezalel Academy of Arts and Design, Jerusalem)
- 2012: I'm Not a Thief (Ani Lo Ganav), young adult novel
- 2011: Cat, Come Home: A Childrenʹs Guide to Raising Cats
- 2010: The Story of Ben Yehuda
- 2009: The God in the Machine
- 2007: Letters from Nowhere (translated into Spanish, German, Catalan, Dutch, Italian, Japanese)
- 2002: Only Galia Can See Them
- 2000: Matti’s Orange Revolution (was adapted to a play)
- 1998: Just for Milli

== Awards ==
- 1999: Ze'ev Prize for her first book, Just for Milli
- Letters from Nowhere received several awards:
  - 2007: Yad Vashem Prize
  - 2008: Ze'ev Prize
  - 2010: German Children's Literature Award
- Letters from Nowhere received several awards:
  - 2002: DafDaf Prize for children's literature
  - 2013: Lea Goldberg Prize
  - 2014: Andersen Honor Citation, Public Libraries Award, Bialik Prize
