= Sabich =

Israeli Street Food sandwich

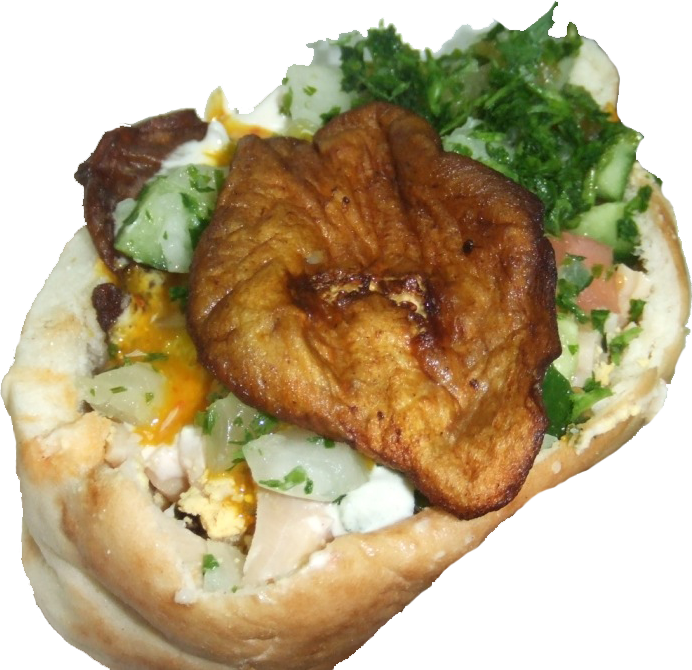
- Course: Sandwich, street food
- Associated cuisine: Israeli cuisine
- Main ingredients: Traditionally laffa, although pita is often used, eggplant, hard boiled eggs, salad, amba, parsley, tahini sauce, and hummus
- Ingredients generally used: Potato, onion, and zhug

Sabich or sabih (Hebrew: סביח [saˈbiχ]; Judeo-Iraqi Arabic: صبيح [sˤaˈbiːħ]) is a sandwich of pita or laffa bread stuffed with fried eggplant, hard-boiled eggs, chopped salad, parsley, amba and tahini sauce. It is a staple of Israeli cuisine and is based on a traditional Iraqi Jewish breakfast. It was created in Israel by Sabich Tzvi Halabi, an Iraqi Jewish immigrant, in the early 1960s, who put the ingredients, which were traditionally served separately, into a single pita.

== Etymology ==
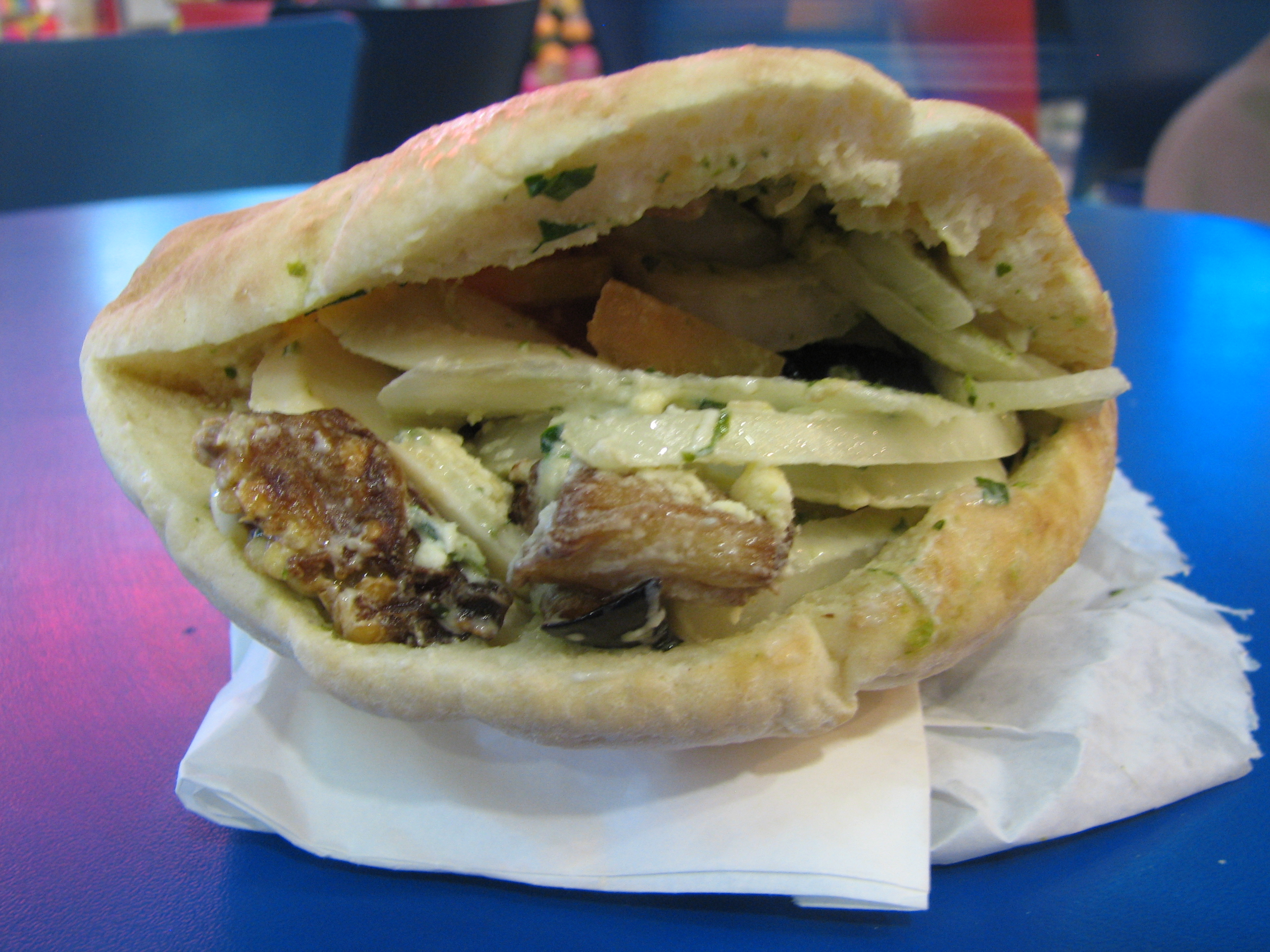
Sabich as served in a pita

The sandwich's name is commonly attributed to its creator, Sabich Tzvi Halabi, who was born in Baghdad in 1938 and immigrated to Israel in the early 1950s. However, there are alternate theories on the origin of the name. The word sabah means "morning" in Arabic, which may be a reference to the fact the ingredients are those of a typical Shabbat breakfast among Iraqi Jews.

Popular folk legend attributes the name סביח to an acronym of the Hebrew words "Salat, Beitsa, yoter Ḥatsil" סלט ביצה יותר חציל, meaning "salad, egg, more eggplant". This is a humorous interpretation and hence a backronym.

According to a relative of Halabi interviewed by Ynet, the sandwich's name indeed does come from its creator. However, Halabi had never intended to brand the dish with his name. Instead, it happened due to circumstance, explaining: "People would stand in line and ask, ‘Make me a dish, Sabich.’ People on the side thought the dish itself was called sabich, and it became ‘a sabich dish.’" In the interview, the relative further explained that Halabi could have used the fact that his name was used for a dish to earn a fortune but failed to do so, claiming: "both Sabich and his partner Yaakov were old-school people and didn’t know how to leverage it. At some point their children got involved, but it was too late, and sabich had already become the name of a food. In the 1980s, the family registered the name of the dish, ‘sabich,’ as a trademark and paid fees to the Justice Ministry for years, but everyone was already calling it that and no one sued."

== History ==
A common Shabbat breakfast in Iraq consists of eggplant fried the day before, eggs slowly cooked overnight in t'bit, boiled potatoes, hummus, amba, and/or an accompanying salad. Traditionally the meal is served as separate components on a plate and was referred to as "lafa with egg and eggplant".

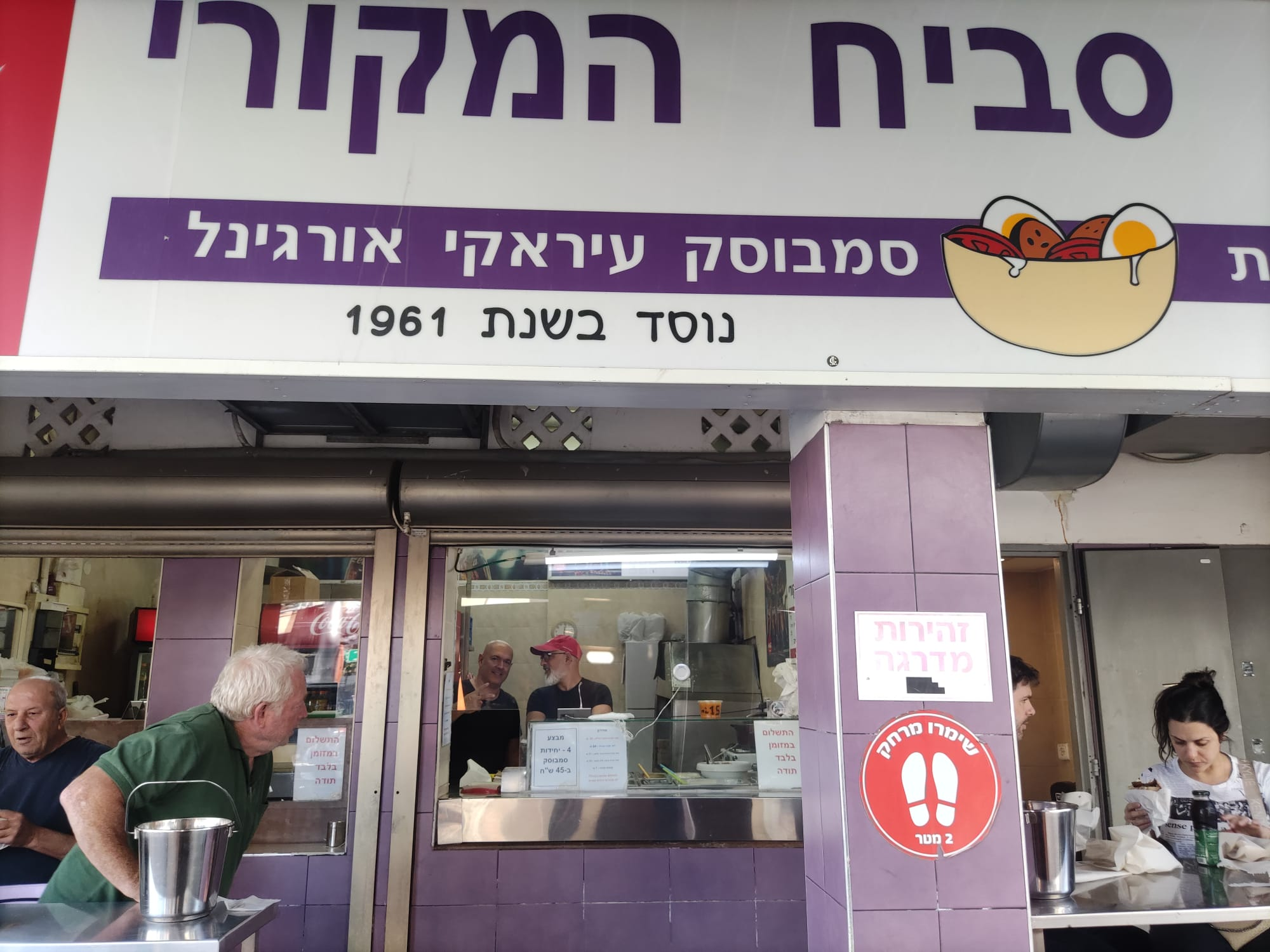
The original Sabich Buffet in its current location

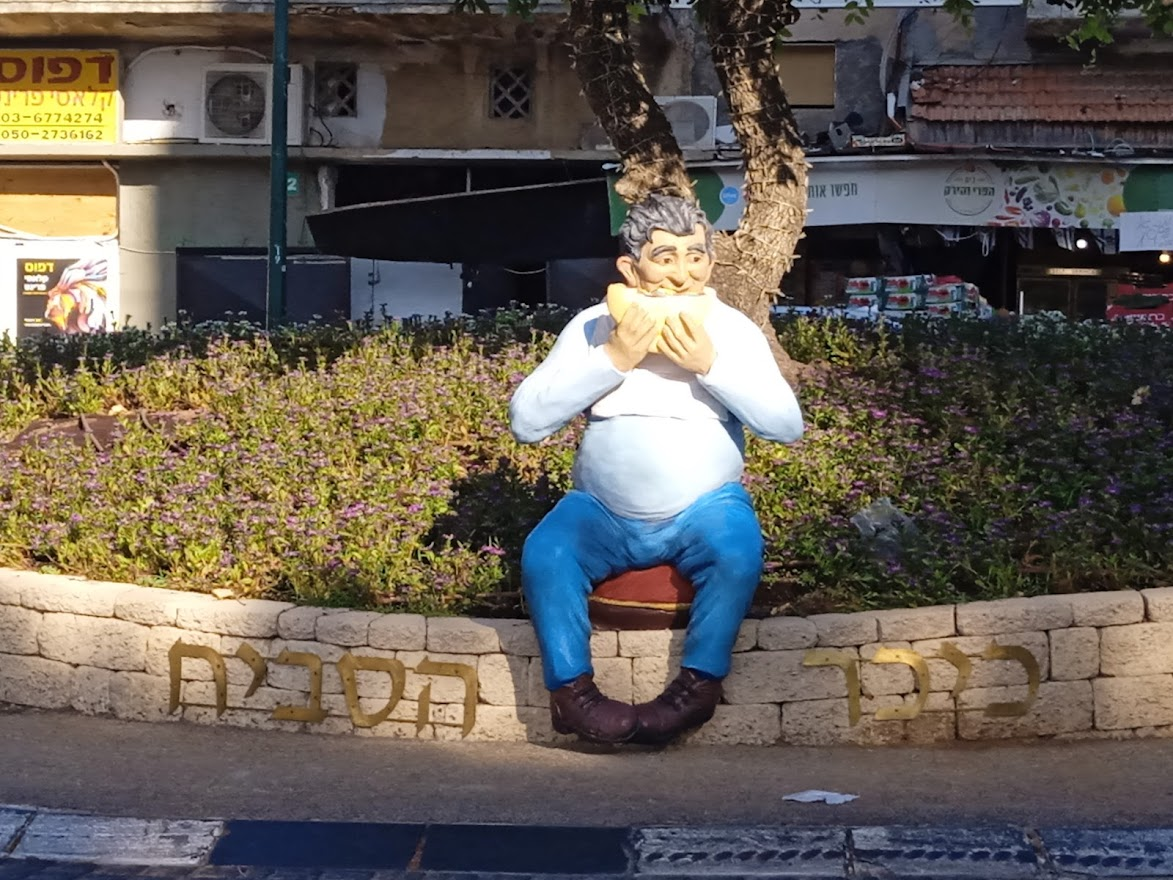
Sabich Square in Ramat Gan

In 1961, Sabich Halabi and his wife Rina opened a kiosk on Uziel Street in Ramat Gan, and initially sold soft drinks, snacks, candy, and cigarettes to passerby. Many of their customers were bus drivers of line 63, as its last stop was next to their kiosk. The drivers, tired and hungry after finishing their shifts, were dissatisfied with the paltry selection and asked the couple for a filling meal. Sabich Halabi then created a sandwich based on the traditional Iraqi Jewish Shabbat meals of his childhood. Eggplant is a year-round crop in Israel, and eggs were available during the period of austerity in Israel, so both ingredients had long been in common use in the early 1960s. Halabi put the ingredients into a pita and began selling the new sandwich to the bus drivers as a simple, filling, easy-to-eat meal. Word about the bus drivers' new meal spread, and the stand soon became popular with the general public.

In Israel, the sandwich became a popular street food. In the 1960s, after Rina had to stop working at the stand due to personal crises, Sabich Halabi recruited his friend Yaakov Sasson to run the stand with him and the two became business partners. In 1982, Halabi and Sasson moved the operation to HaRoeh Street, at the corner of Negba Street, where it is currently still in business. A wave of new sabich stands opened in Israel in the early 1990s. Sabich Halabi died of ALS in 2012. During his battle with the disease he had insisted on continuing to come to work at the stand until his final days. Yaakov Sasson died six years later. The Halabi and Sasson families continue to jointly operate the stand. One of Sasson's children opened a separate sabich stand elsewhere.

In 2020 the mayor of Ramat Gan announced the Negba-Uziel Street intersection would be named Sabich Square.

== Ingredients and description ==
Sabich typically includes fried eggplant slices, a cucumber-and-tomato salad, amba, and haminados eggs, which are slow-cooked in hamin until they turn brown. Some versions include potatoes, pickles, a tahini sauce, hummus, or other condiments. It is commonly served in pita bread or wrapped in laffa, an Iraqi flatbread.

Daniel Gritzer, writing for Serious Eats, describes the sandwich as "it's drippy, it's messy, it's shamelessly moist and flavorful. There are creamy swaths, and squishy bits, and crunchy chunks, and tart bursts".

A version without the bread or pita is called Sabich salad ("סלט סביח" – "Salat Sabich" in Hebrew).

== Importance in Israeli cuisine ==
The dish is served throughout Israel. Though not well known outside Israel, it is also available in various restaurants around the world. According to Ronit Vered, writing in Haaretz, the sandwich became "an integral part of the limited canon of Israeli cuisine". Tami Shem-Tov wrote Saba Sabich (Grandpa Sabich), a children's picture book published in 2017 by Kinneret Zmora-Bitan in Hebrew, which according to Yahil Zaban of Tel Aviv University details how the sandwich became "a symbol of the new Israeli culture".

According to Janna Gur, the sandwich is "the first street snack that sprang from a Jewish culinary tradition" in Israeli cuisine and was more popular in Israel than falafel.

== Gallery ==
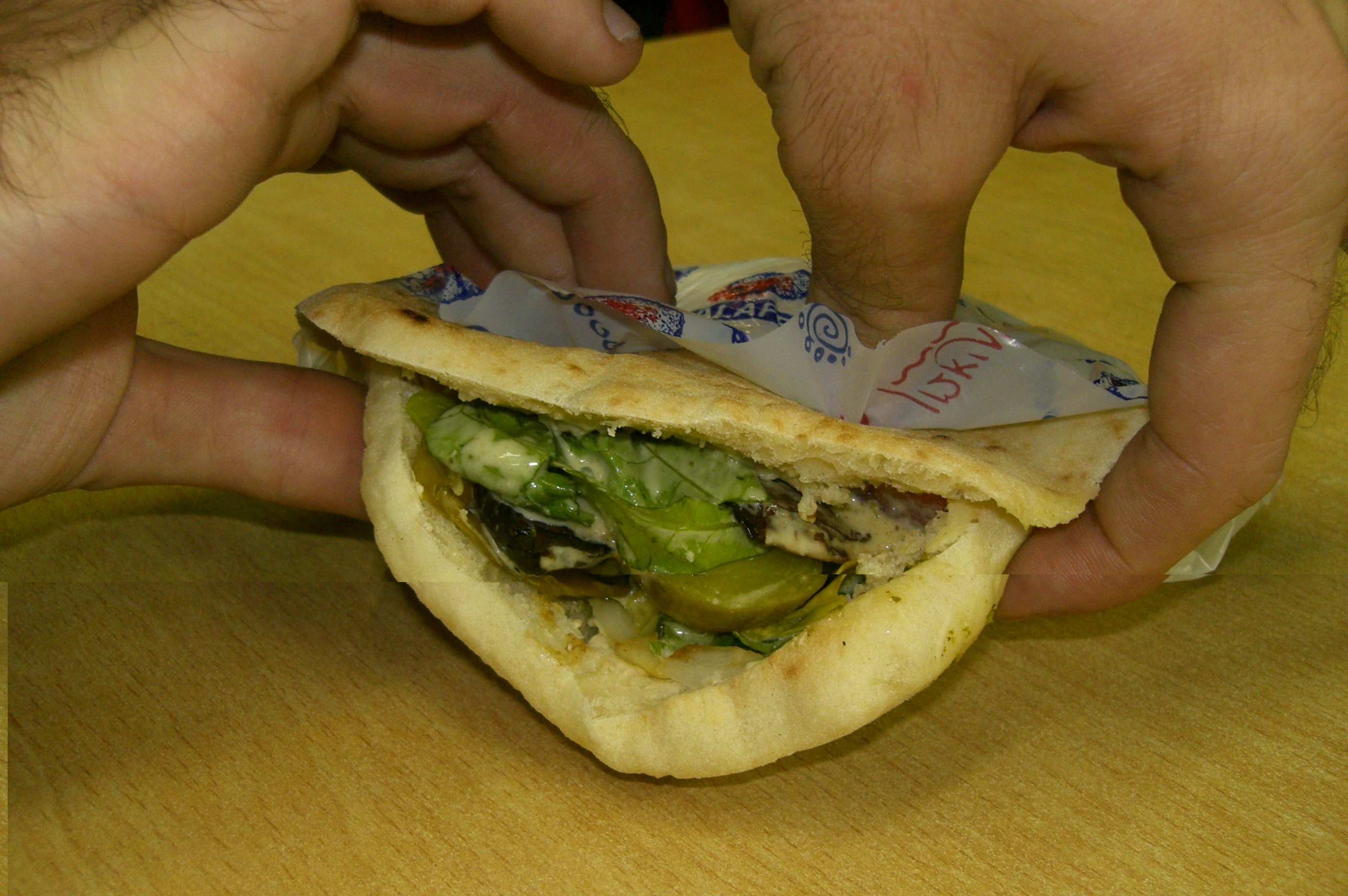

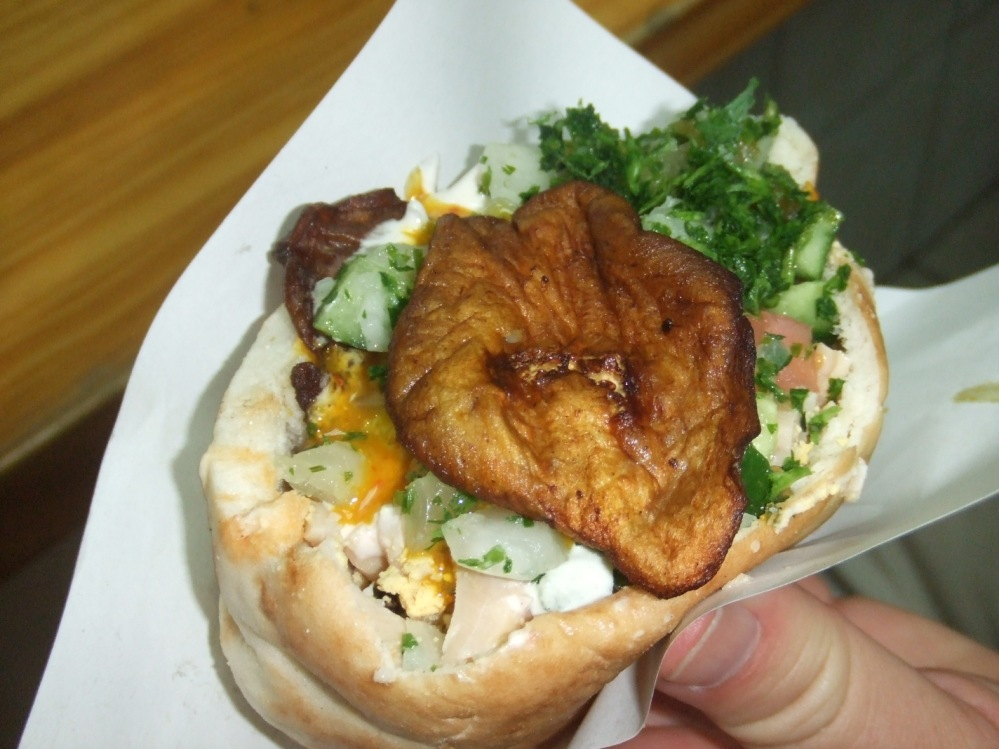

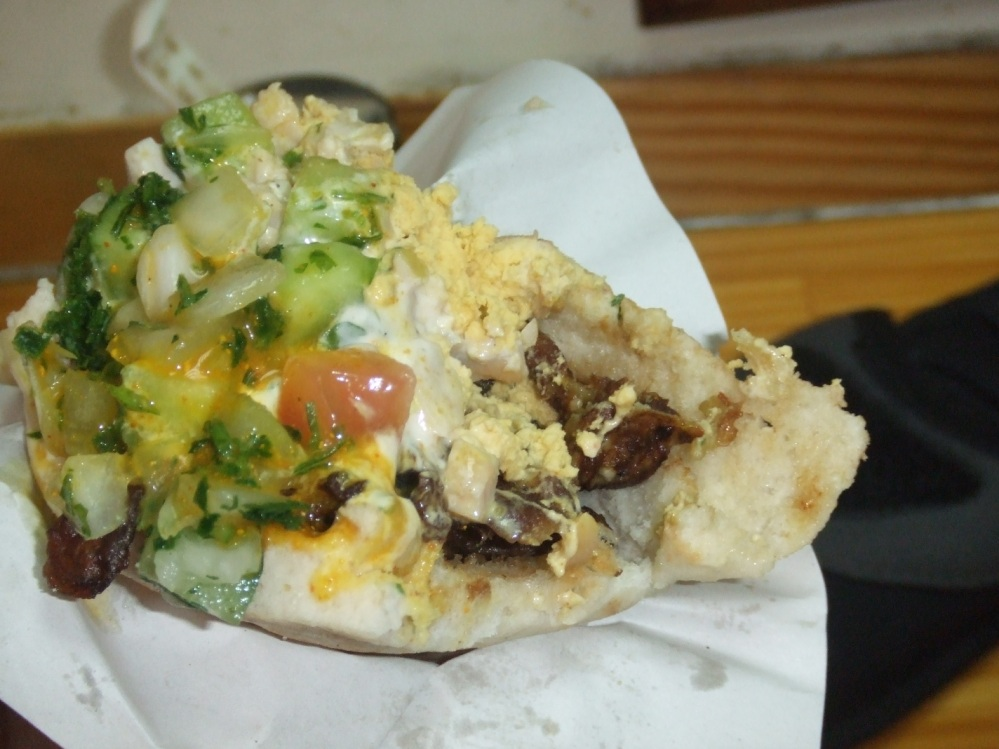

== See also ==
- Culture of Israel
- Cuisine of the Mizrahi Jews
- Jewish cuisine
- Middle Eastern cuisine
