= Cholent =

Ashkenazi Jewish Sabbath stew

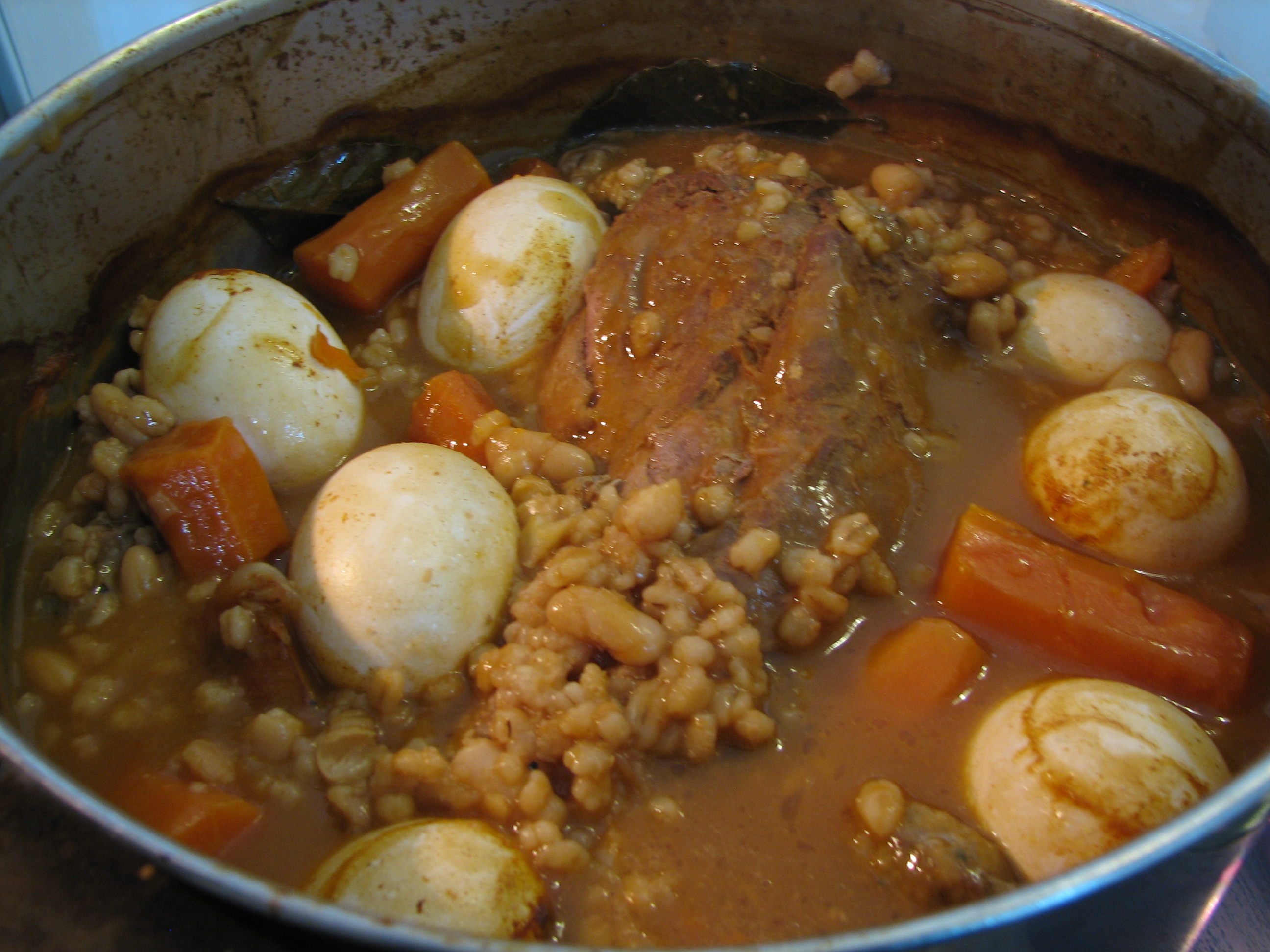
- Alternative names: Schalet, Hamin
- Type: Sabbath stew
- Place of origin: France
- Created by: Ashkenazi Jews
- Main ingredients: Whole grains, meat, beans, potatoes
- Variations: Hamin

Cholent or Schalet (Yiddish: טשאָלנט, romanized: tsholnt) is a traditional slow-simmering Sabbath stew in Jewish cuisine that was developed by Ashkenazi Jews first in France and later Germany. It was first mentioned in the 12th century. It is similar to the French cassoulet. Cholen is believed to have been derived from hamin, a similar Sabbath stew that emerged in Spain among Sephardic Jews and made its way to France by way of Provence.

== Etymology ==
Max Weinreich traces the etymology of cholent to the Latin present participle calentem (an accusative form of calēns), meaning "that which is hot" (as in calorie), via Old French chalant (present participle of chalt, from the verb chaloir, "to warm"). One widely quoted folk etymology derives the word from French chaud ("hot") and lent ("slow"). Another folk etymology derives cholent (or sholen) from שלן, which means "that rested [overnight]", referring to the tradition of Jewish families placing their individual pots of cholent into the town baker's ovens, which always stayed hot, where they slow-cooked the food overnight.

== Background ==
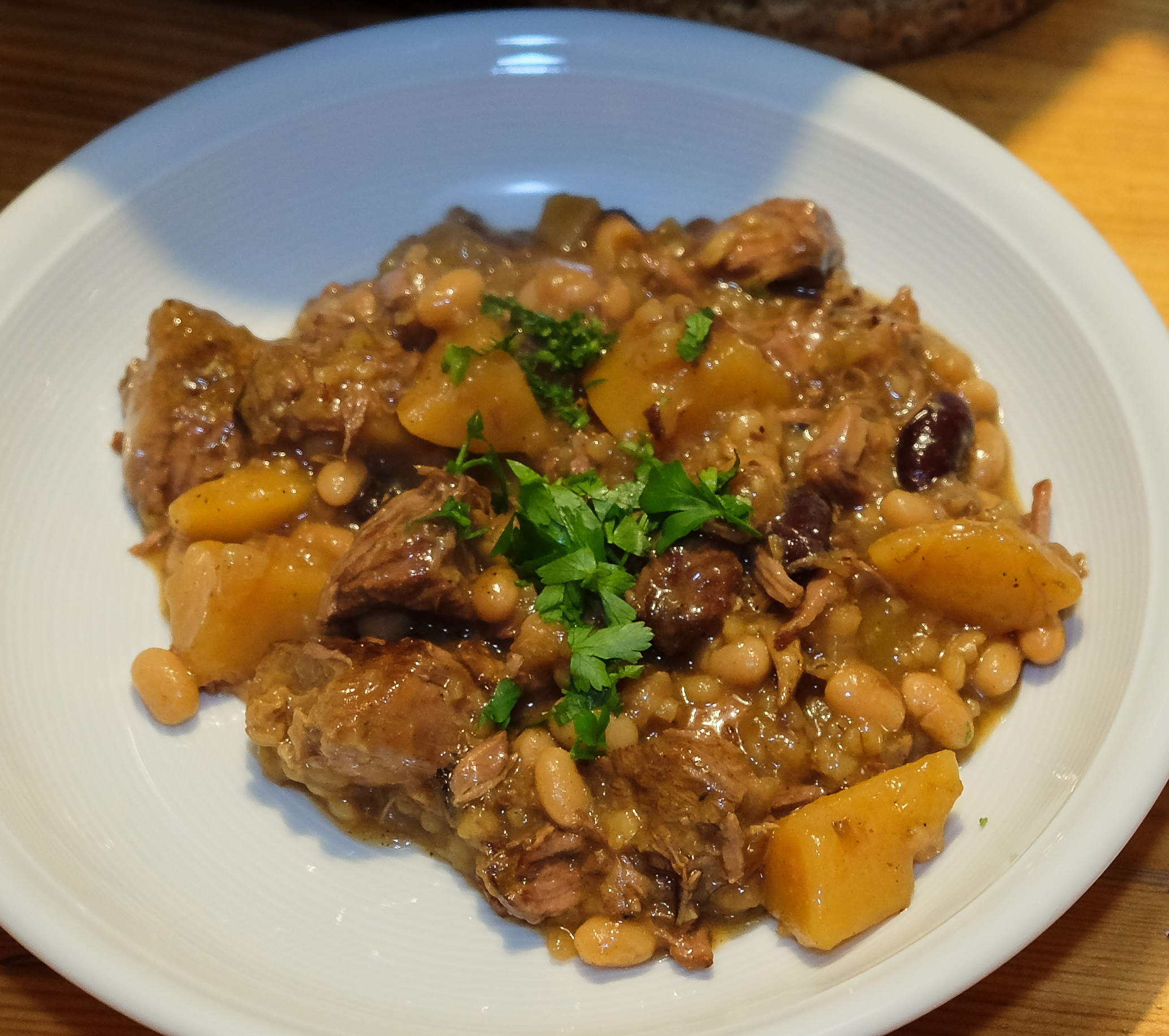
Cholent

Shabbat stews were developed over the centuries to conform with Jewish laws that prohibit cooking on the Sabbath. The pot is brought to a boil on Friday before the Sabbath begins, and sometimes kept on a blech or hotplate, or left in a slow oven or electric slow cooker, until the following day. Cholent originated as a barley porridge in ancient Judea as a type of "harisa". Over the centuries various Jewish diaspora communities created their own variations of the dish based on local food resources and neighborhood influence.

There are many variations of the dish, which is standard in both the Ashkenazi and Sephardi kitchens and among other communities. The basic ingredients of cholent are meat, potatoes, beans, and barley though all shabbat stews contain some type of grain and meat or featured vegetable. Slow overnight cooking allows the flavors of the various ingredients to permeate and produces the characteristic taste of each local stew.

In traditional Ashkenazi, Sephardi, and Mizrahi families, stew is the hot main course of the midday Shabbat meal served on Saturdays typically after the morning synagogue services for practicing Jews. Secular Jewish families also serve stews like cholent or eat them in Israeli restaurants. For practicing Jews, lighting a fire and cooking food are among the activities prohibited on Shabbat by the written Torah. Therefore, cooked Shabbat food must be prepared before the onset of the Jewish Shabbat at sunset Friday night.

Cholent was first mentioned by name 1180 CE by R. Yitzhak ben Moshe of Vienna who says "I saw in France in the home of my teacher R. Yehuda bar Yitzhak that sometimes their cholent pots were buried. And on Shabbat before the meal, the servants light the fire near the cauldrons so that they warm well, and some remove them and bring them close to the fire".

== History ==
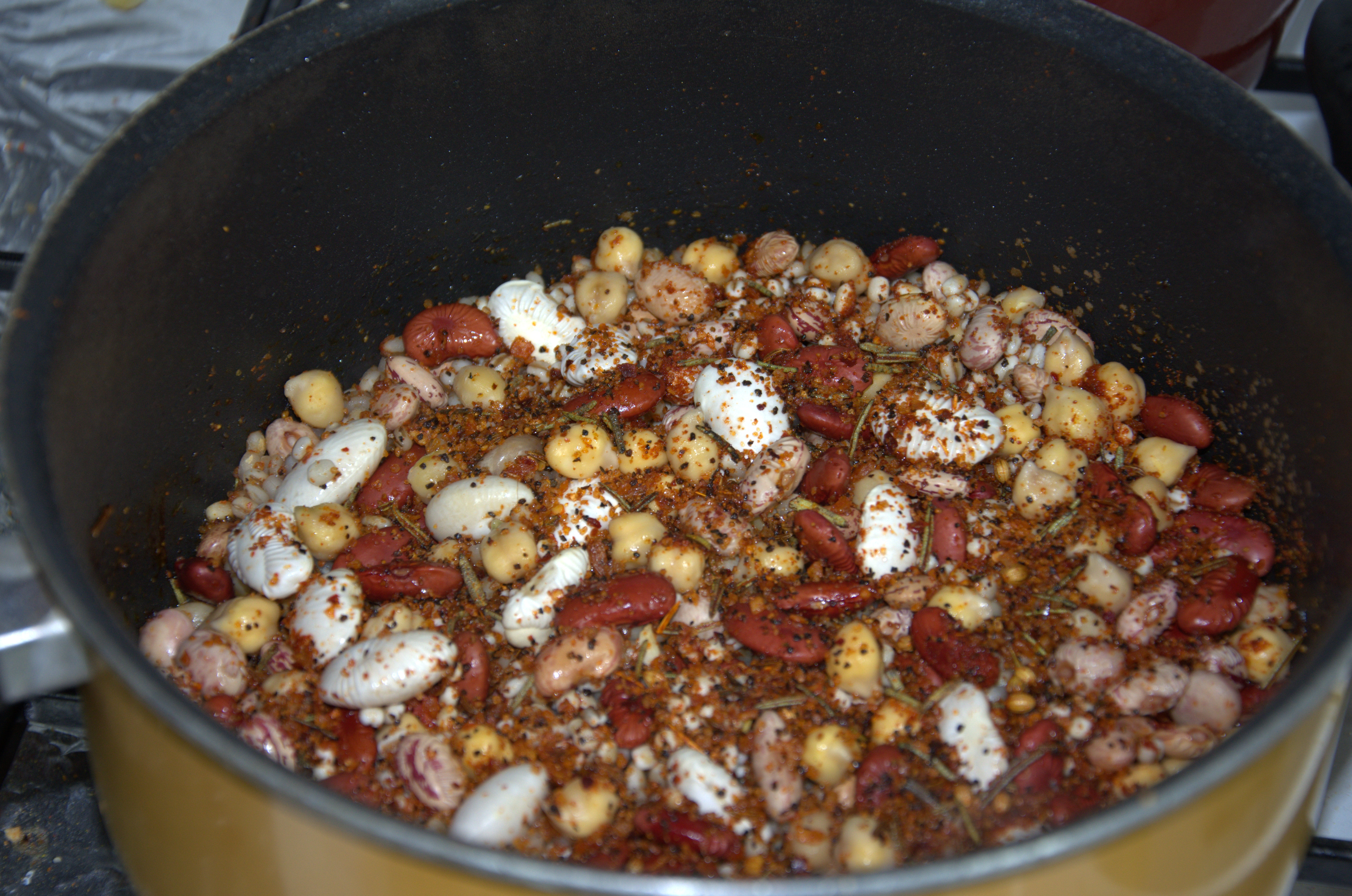
Cholent in the process of cooking

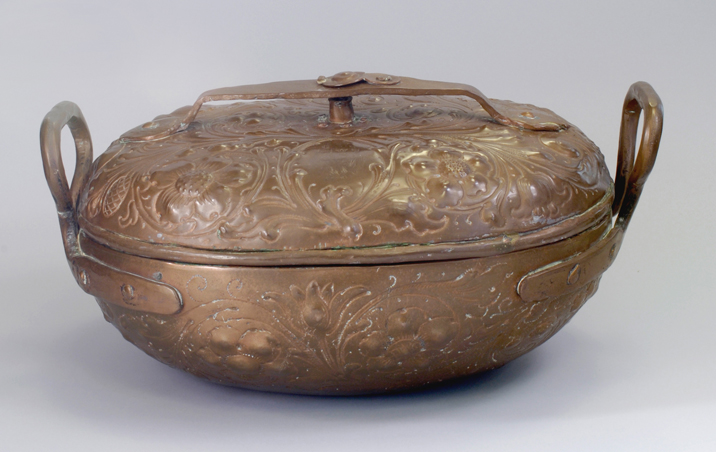
Cholent pot, Eastern Europe, c. 1700

The origins of cholent date back to the 11th century, to the Christian Reconquista of Al-Andalus or Islamic Spain, when culinary techniques from the Moorish period spread northwards into Europe through Provence. In the late 12th or early 13th century, the Sephardic Sabbath stew known as hamin became a part of the traditions of the Jews of France.

Among the French Ashkenazi Jewish population, the traditional stew was renamed tsholnt, cholent or schalet, likely from the old French for warm, chald or chalt (the antecedent of today's chaud), or from chald-de-lit ("warmth of the bed").

By the 13th century, the stew is described as having become widespread in Bohemia and Germany. Originally made with fava beans, the cholent of the French Ashkenazi was substituted with dried haricot beans from the Americas in the sixteenth century. Since then, white beans, red kidney beans, pinto beans, and dried lima beans have all become common ingredients. Some Romanians add chickpeas in "a remnant of the Sephardic influence due to Ottoman control of the area".

Since European agriculture favoured bread wheat instead of durum, substitutions were made. In Germany, spelt became common in cholent, while in Eastern Europe, the grain of choice became barley. The usual choice of meat in cholent is beef, either flank or brisket, or, occasionally in Western and Central Europe, goose or duck.

In the mid-19th century, Polish cholent featured generous amounts of potato, while Hungarian cholent used no potato at all. German variations added root vegetables. Onions might be added fried or raw, alongside garlic. The stew might also be sweetened with honey, sugar, or fruit, and spiced with cloves, paprika, or bay leaves.

=== Diasporic dispersal ===
As the Jewish diaspora grew with Jewish migrations into Europe, North Africa, and elsewhere in the Middle East and Central Asia, Jewish diaspora communities developed their own variations of the dish based on the local climate, available ingredients and local influence. John Cooper argues that shabbat stews like cholent would have spread from Jerusalem east towards Babylon and simultaneously across the Mediterranean by North Africa into Iberia and eventually Italy and France while Marks cites Persian, Yemen, and Italian communities to predate Sephardim in Iberia.

=== Original diets ===
The most accessible foods to Jews living in Israel before the destruction of the Second Temple are likely to have been the Mediterranean triad: grain, oil and wine, which were available at low cost and vast amounts. While both wheat and barley were grown in Israel, barley was more likely to supplement inland diets. Cooper argues wheat would have been twice as expensive as barley which could grow in rougher soils closer to Jerusalem. Barley could also be harvested earlier ensuring multiple crops in the same season.

Meats were considered luxury goods that few could afford, except on special occasions like Shabbat and other holidays. Lamb and goat would have been more common as they grazed in arid climates, and provided supplementary products like wool and milk, while cattle were more expensive to maintain and prized as sacrificial offerings.

=== Moorish Iberia ===
Chicken was likely domesticated in Southeast Asia and popularized in Ur around 2100 BCE, though the Israelites would have been less likely to eat it due to association of Roman sacrifice. Until the 8th century, the upkeep for chickens meant they could only be raised in small numbers, making them a delicacy few could afford outside of Shabbat. Olla podrida rose in popularity in the 13th century featuring a porridge of vegetables, spices, and meat, usually beef. A famine in the 14th century in Northern Europe caused a rise in cattle prices near Western Europe and North Africa, where most Jews were living under Moorish rule. This led to chicken replacing cattle as livestock, and resulted in many recipe alterations to accommodate these changes in Iberia and Northern Africa.

The increase in chicken led to a surplus of eggs as a renewable resource. "Huevos haminados" began to describe the long process of long roasting eggs in hamin pots overnight that produced a signature aroma. The concept of "re'ach nicho'ach" describes the direct line of spiritual connection of scents from the nose to the soul. giving the egg an extra spiritual strength for Jews. In Kabbalah, the eggs are even watched over by an angel.

=== Post Reconquista ===
The rise of the Spanish conquest of Iberia, known as the Reconquista, stretched from as early as the establishment of Christian Kingdom Asturias in the early 8th century until the surrendering of Granada in 1492 by the ruling Moorish Kingdom. Jews were faced with limited options after the Alhambra Decree expelled non-Christian religious practices or face expulsion. Jews who migrated east across the Mediterranean after the Alhambra Decree became known as "Sephardic" Jews (literally Spanish Jews) and often reintegrated themselves to well established Jewish communities in North Africa or even the Ottoman Empire where the Ladino language, an Iberian language heavily influenced by Hebrew, began to explode in popularity.

Jewish "conversos" who had converted to Christianity, either sincerely or as a ruse, began to mainstream Jewish practices into Iberian culture. Sephardim who remained religious learned to hide observation of shabbat by "hiding" or "concealing" their pots in the embers of household fires or underground ovens from their Christian neighbors. Hamin became known as adafina or dafina as local ingredients changed hamin's base to a rice and chicken dish to match local practices. Stews like "Gallina a la Vinagreta" began to rise in popularity nationally around the same making the ingredients almost indistinguishable.

The slow warming of the embers inspired an extra layer of precaution to the prohibition of cooking on shabbat, the blech. The blech covers a fire or modern stovetops to prevent cooking while allowing heat to transfer from one item to another indirectly as a warm source without "kindling". Hamin, scheena and cholent all commonly use a blech pinpointing their distinctions to a similar time period. The unique cooking requirements of hamin were later the inspiration for the invention of the slow cooker.

=== Columbian Exchange ===
Even in ancient Israel, it is likely that vegetables supplemented stews with native vegetables like leek, garlic, and onions, which were more accessible to poorer communities like future Ashkenazi. Historians have little proof other than modern economic trends; these recipes were not well-documented at the time, and the decomposition of vegetables makes it difficult to find conclusive archaeological evidence of their presence in any given period.

After the Columbian Exchange, new vegetables like potatoes, tomatoes, and beans rose in popularity. They offered more substantial nutrients at lower costs than meats but with more flavor than barley, wheat, or rice. In the Maghreb, a South American hot chili pepper called "harissa" thrived in the region's soil. Slow cooking crushed wheat, tomatoes, and harissa created a spicy sauce that added new flavors to classic rice dishes.

Beans from the New World rapidly replaced barley and rice used in North Africa and Europe. In Greece and Turkey, "avicas" substituted the rice in hamin with white beans and even smaller haricot beans left over from Shabbat's Friday night dinner.

== Variations ==
=== Israel ===
In Israel, cholent has become a dish widely available in restaurants. In 2013, cholenterias, casual restaurants specializing in cholent, emerged in Bnei Brak and the Haredi neighborhoods of Jerusalem, and became the premier night hangout areas for Haredi men. Soon afterwards, cholent dishes spread to restaurants in secular areas.

Sephardim in Tel Aviv originated "sofrito" made of beef, potatoes, and various spices eaten at Friday night shabbat dinners and added to the main meal the next day.

The making of cholent in the land of Israel is documented as early as 1650, when traveler Moses Poryat of Prague described it being cooked in ovens located near the Jewish Quarter of Jerusalem.

=== Central and Eastern European ===
In Germany, the Netherlands, and other western European countries the special hot dish for the Shabbat lunch is known as schalet, shalent, or shalet.

The Jewish people of Hungary adapted the Hungarian dish sólet to serve the same purpose as cholent. Sólet was likely modified by the Jewish people living in Pannonia when the Magyars arrived. This pork version of solet became so popular that it is sold across the country as a canned good in grocery stores.

In Italy, pasta is a common substitute for beans or rice in shabbat stews and is called "hamin macaron" when sampled in Iberia. The rise of Chassidism in the late 18th century popularized black beans in Eastern Europe as the Baal Shem Tov's favorite bean while Alsatian Cholent in France featured lima beans.

=== North and South America ===
To honor the tradition of eggs in cholent, some American Jews long roast meatloaves for Friday night and place whole eggs to be peeled and eaten. The Kosher Cajun Cookbook features New Orleans-style Cajun food with kosher substitutes like gumbo and jambalaya. Puerto Rican hamin is considered a stewed "arroz con pollo."

== Communal cooking ==
In the shtetls of Europe and in Jerusalem, before the advent of electricity and cooking gas, a pot with the assembled but uncooked ingredients was brought to the local baker before sunset on Fridays. The baker would put the pot with the cholent mixture in his oven, which was always kept fired, and families would come by to pick up their cooked cholent on Saturday mornings. The same practice was observed in Morocco, where black pots of s'hina were placed overnight in bakers' ovens and then delivered by bakers' assistants to households on Shabbat morning. Jewish stews were characterized by flour paste used to seal pots to prevent cooking and tampering which could cause the meal to become treif (not kosher).

== See also ==
- Cassoulet
- Cocido madrileño
- Jewish cuisine
  - Ashkenazi Jewish cuisine
  - Israeli cuisine
  - Sephardic Jewish cuisine
- Kashrut
  - Kosher foods
  - Kosher wine
- List of stews
- Hamin
  - Macaroni Hamin
- Ropa vieja
- Sabbath stew
- Tza'ar ba'alei chayim

== Bibliography ==
- Ben Zeev, Miriam. Diaspora Judaism in Turmoil, 116/117 CE: Ancient Sources and Modern Insights. Dudley, MA: Peeters, 2005.
- Brumberg-Kraus, Jonathan. Gastronomic Judaism as Culinary Midrash. Lanham, Maryland: Lexington Books, an imprint of The Rowman & Littlefield Publishing Group, Inc., 2019.
- Cohen, Jake. Jew-Ish: Reinvented Recipes from a Modern Mensch. A Cookbook. Boston: Houghton Mifflin Harcourt, 2021.
- Cooper, Alanna. "Bukharan Jews." In Oxford Bibliographies. New York, NY: Oxford University Press, 2017 rev. 2021.
- Cooper, John. Eat and Be Satisfied: A Social History of Jewish Food. Northvale, NJ: Jason Aronson, 1993.
- Covert, Mildred L., and Sylvia P. Gerson. Kosher Cajun Cookbook. Gretna, La: Pelican Pub. Co., 1987.
- Diner, Hasia R., Simone Cinotto, and Carlo Petrini. Global Jewish Foodways: A History. Edited by Hasia R. Diner and Simone Cinotto. Lincoln, NE: University of Nebraska Press, 2018.
- Dubov, Nissan Dovid. The Laws of Cooking on Shabbos. Brooklyn, NY: Sichos In English, 2001.
- Elais and Gary. "Lamb Harissa & Gazelle’s Horns." Santa Fe, NM: Made In Marrow, 2019, "Made In Marrow's Meal 57: Lamb Harissa & Gazelle's Horns".
- Ganzfried, Solomon ben Joseph, Hyman E. Goldin, Joseph ben Ephraim Karo, and Hyman E. Goldin. Code of Jewish Law = Kitzur Shulḥan Aruḥ: A Compilation of Jewish Laws and Customs. Annotated rev. ed. Rockaway Beach, N.Y: Hebrew Pub. Co., 1993.
- Gavin, Paola. "Red Hot Chili Peppers." In Tablet Magazine. New York, NY: Nextbook Inc., 2022.
- Golstein, Rabbi Zalman. Going Kosher in 30 Days!: An Easy Step-By-Step Guide for the Rest of Us. Monsey, NY: Jewish Learning Group, 2013.
- González-Salinero, Raúl. Military Service and the Integration of Jews into the Roman Empire." Leiden and Boston, MA: The Brill Reference Library of Judaism, 2022.
- Gross, Aaron S., Jody Elizabeth Myers, Jordan Rosenblum, Hasia R. Diner, and Jonathan Safran Foer. Feasting and Fasting: The History and Ethics of Jewish Food. Edited by Aaron S. Gross, Jody Elizabeth Myers, and Jordan Rosenblum. New York: New York University Press, 2019.
- Gur, Janna. The Book of New Israeli Food: A Culinary Journey. 1st American ed. New York: Schocken Books, 2007.
- Haber, Joel. "Chulent and Hamin: The Ultimate Jewish Comfort Food: Celebrating the Most Jewish Food With 12 International Recipes." In The Taste of Jewish Culture. San Francisco, CA: Word Press, 2022.
- Haber, Joel. "Ferik-Egyptian Hamin." In The Taste of Jewish Culture. Jerusalem, Israel: Aish.com, 2022.
- Hackett, Conrad; Grim, Brian J. et al. "The Global Religious Landscape: A Report on the Size Distribution of the World’s Major Religious Groups as of 2010." In The Pew Forum on Religion and Public Life. Washington D.C.: The Pew Research Center's Forum on Religion and Public Life, 2012.
- Heschel, Abraham Joshua. The Sabbath: Its Meaning for Modern Man. New York, NY: Farrar, Straus and Giroux, 2005.
- Ibn al-Karīm, Muḥammad ibn al-Ḥasan, and Charles Perry. A Baghdad Cookery Book: The Book of Dishes (Kitāb Al-Ṭabīkh). Totnes: Prospect, 2005.
- Johnson, George. "Scholars Debate Roots of Yiddish, Migration of Jews." In The New York Times. New York, NY: The New York Times, October 29, 1996.
- Judah, Yehudah ibn Tibon and Abraham Zifroni. Sefer ha-Kuzari. Tel Aviv, Israel: Schoken Publishing House, 1970.
- Kimiagarov, Amnun. Classic Central Asian (Bukharian) Jewish Cuisine and Customs. New York, NY: Alpha Translation & Publishing, 2010.
- Karo, Joseph ben Ephraim, Moses ben Israel Isserles, and Yitsḥak ben Aharon. Shulḥan ʻarukh ... Krakow: Sons of Isaac Prustits, 1618.
- "Language and Culture Archive of Ashkenazic Jewry Digital Archive User Guide: Introduction." In Columbia University Libraries. New York, NY: Columbia University, 2022.
- Lebewohl, Sharon, and Rena Bulkin. The 2nd Ave Deli Cookbook: Recipes and Memories from Abe Lebewohl’s Legendary New York Kitchen. New York: Villard, 1999.
- Maimonides. The 613 Mitzvot or Sefer Hamitzvos. Translated by Berel Bell. Brooklyn, NY: Sichos in English, 2006.
- Marks, Gil. Encyclopedia of Jewish Foods. Hoboken, NJ: John Wiley & Sons, 2010.
- Nathan, Joan. Jewish Cooking in America. Expanded edition. New York: Alfred A. Knopf Inc., 1998.
- Newhouse, Alana, Stephanie Butnick, Noah Fecks, Joana Avillez, and Gabriella Gershenson. The 100 Most Jewish Foods: A Highly Debatable List. Edited by Alana Newhouse, Stephanie Butnick, and Gabriella Gershenson. New York: Artisan, 2019.
- Ottolenghi, Yotam, and Sami Tamimi. Jerusalem: A Cookbook. 1st U.S. ed. Berkeley: Ten Speed Press, 2012.
- Pintel-Ginsberg, Idit. The Angel and the Cholent: Food Representation from the Israel Folktale Archives. Detroit, MI: Wayne State University Press, 2021.
- Pressman, Hannah. "What is the History of Ladino and its Alphabet". In Stroum Center for Jewish Studies Newsletter. Seattle, WA: Henry M. Jackson School of International Studies at the University of Washington, 2020, "What is the history of Ladino and its alphabet?"
- Richardson, Peter and Amy Marie Fisher. Herod: King of the Jews and Friend of the Romans. Second edition. Abingdon, Oxon: Routledge, 2018.
- Shor, Leanne. "This Bukharian Jewish Meaty Rice Dish is the Crockpot Meal You Need." In JMore Baltimore Living. Baltimore, MD: Maryland Jewish Media, 2018, "This Bukharian Jewish Meaty Rice Dish is the Crockpot Meal You Need".
- Stavans, Ilan. Jewish Literature: A Very Short Introduction. New York, NY: Oxford University Press, 2021.
- Stein, Lori and Ronald H. Isaacs. Let’s Eat: Jewish Food and Faith. Lanham, Maryland: Rowman & Littlefield, 2018.
- Tauber, Yanki. Beyond the Letter of Law: A Chassidic Companion to the Talmud’s Ethics of the Fathers. 1st edition. Brooklyn NY: Vaad Hanochos Hatmimim, 1994.
- Yitzahk ben Moishe or "Zaruah" in his Mishnah Torah. Or Zaruah, part 2, Hilhot Erev Shabbat, 3b.
