= Sólet =

Hungarian-Jewish stew

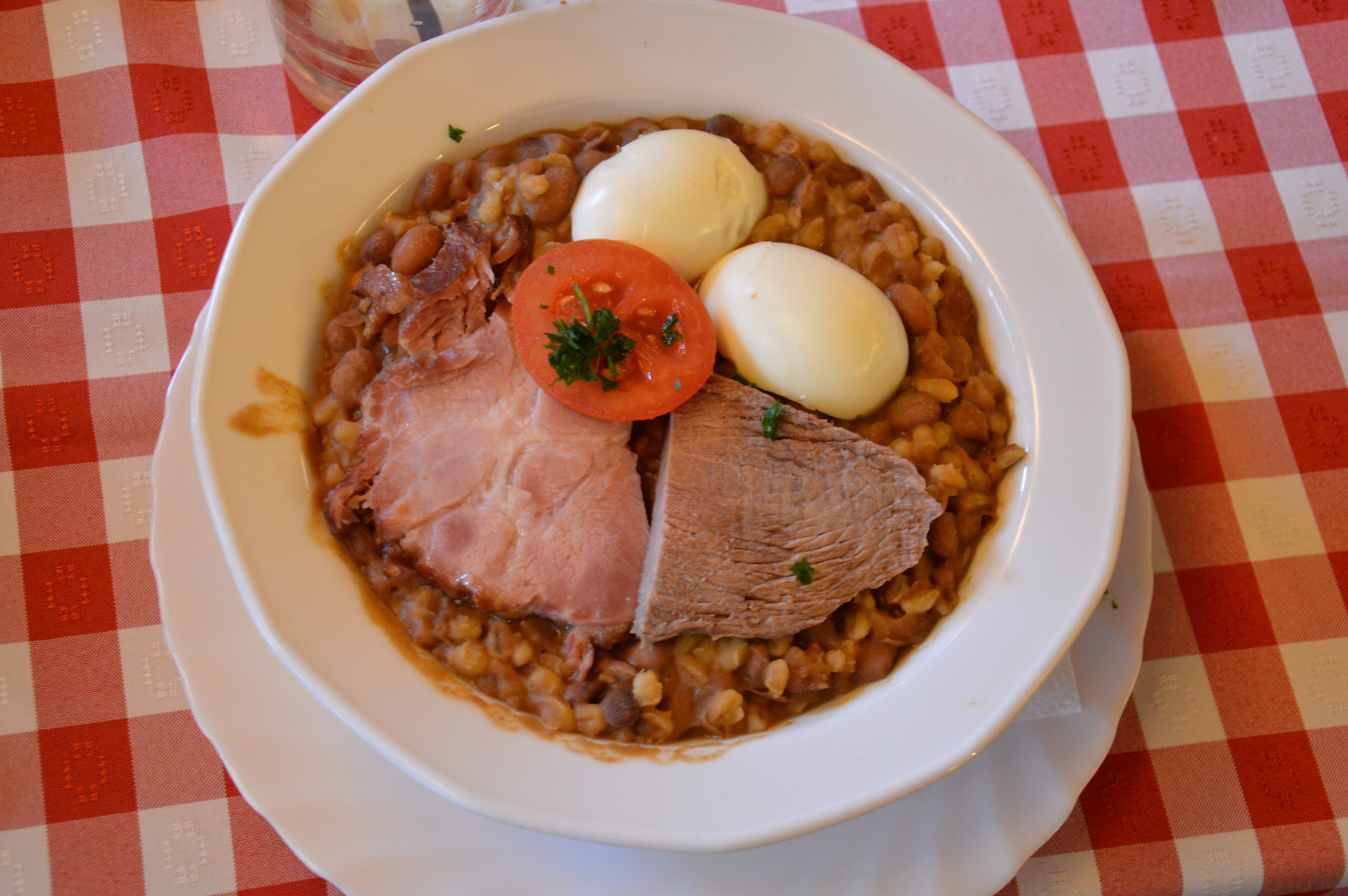
A bowl of sólet garnished with a slice of ham, a slice of roast beef, a slice of tomato, and a halved egg

Sólet (Hungarian: [ˈʃoːlɛt]) is a traditional Hungarian-Jewish stew made with kidney beans, barley, onions, paprika, and usually meat. While traditionally a Jewish food, prepared on Fridays before Shabbat and eaten the following day for lunch, it is also commonly eaten by non-Jewish Hungarians, who may even add pork.

Sólet is a variant of Cholent, the traditional Jewish Shabbat dish. It was likely modified by the Hungarians living in the Carpathian Basin when the Jews arrived and introduced it to them.

== See also ==
- List of stews
