= Macaroni Hamin =

Sephardic macaroni dish

Macaroni hamin
- Course: Meal
- Place of origin: Israel
- Region or state: Jerusalem
- Serving temperature: Hot
- Main ingredients: Macaroni, chicken, tomato paste, potatoes, hard-boiled eggs

Macaroni hamin (hamin macaroni in Hebrew) is a traditional Sephardic Jerusalemite dish originally from the Jewish Quarter of the Old City of Jerusalem. It consists of macaroni, chicken, potatoes and spices. Traditionally macaroni hamin is slow-cooked overnight before Shabbat. Similar to other dishes prepared in communities of Jewish Sephardic and Iraqi origin haminados eggs can be added. Macaroni hamin is still eaten by Sephardic Jews who have origins inside the Old City of Jerusalem.

== Preparation ==
The dish is made with pre-cooked bucatini pasta, cooked chicken pieces, potato slices, and a sauce of onions, tomato paste, and seasonings simmered in chicken fat. It is cooked slowly in water with whole eggs in the shell for at least six hours, usually baked overnight, and traditionally served for Shabbat.

== See also ==
- Hamin
- Cuisine of Jerusalem
- Israeli cuisine
