= Haminados =

Sephardic Jewish braised eggs

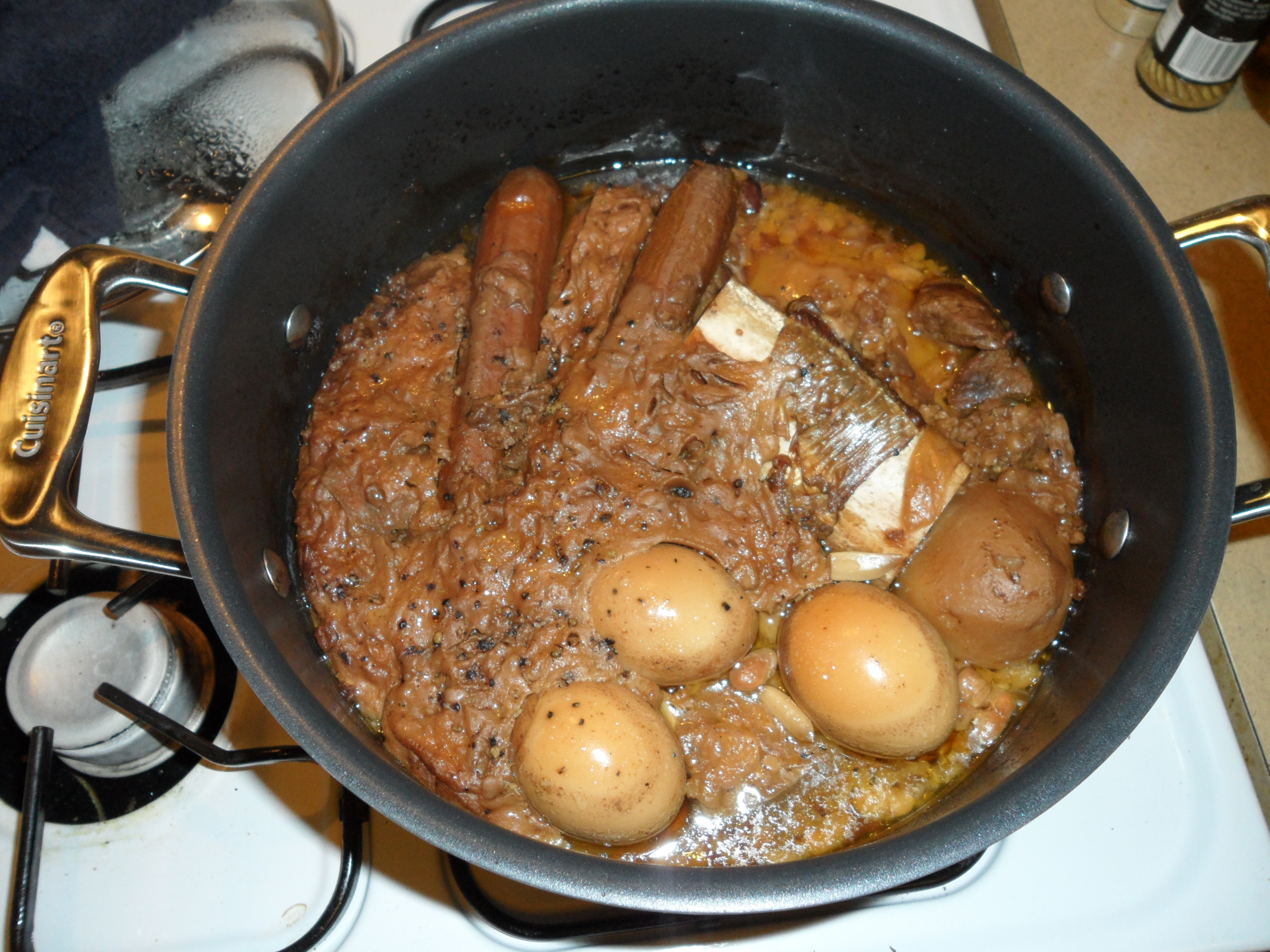
- Haminados eggs (bottom) in hamin stew
- Place of origin: Spain
- Created by: Sephardic Jews
- Main ingredients: Chicken eggs

Haminados is a Sephardic Jewish dish of eggs that are cooked slowly until the whites turn red-brown and the yolks darken. The name is derived from the Hebrew word "ḥam (חם)," meaning "hot," reflecting the dish's preparation method. It is also known as huevos haminados, chaminados, or braised eggs.

Haminados have been a component of Jewish cuisine since at least the 15th century in Medieval Spain. Today, they are an integral part of Israeli cuisine, typically prepared either on their own or as part of the Sephardic and Mizrahi Shabbat stew known as chamin (a counterpart of Ashkenazi Cholent). These braised eggs are often eaten as an ingredient or accompaniment in various dishes.

== Name ==
The dish's name is haminados (guevos haminados in Ladino, meaning “warmed eggs”) Historically, it was also called huebos hammados. The name derives from the Spanish word "huevos," meaning eggs, and the Hebrew word "ham" (חם) meaning "hot," appended with the Spanish ending "-ados" (perfect-passive, masculine plural), thus "made hot, heated."

== History ==
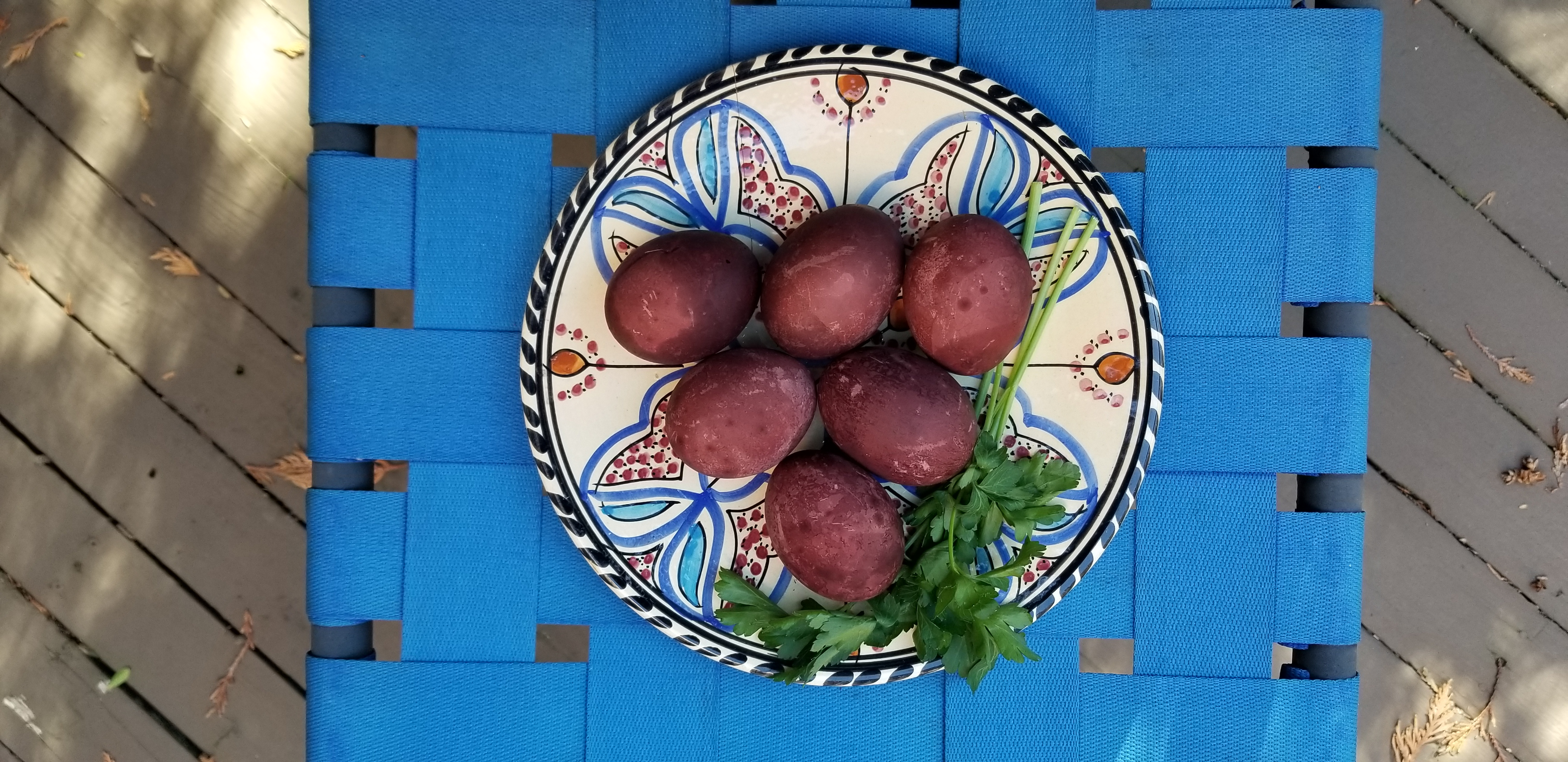
Huebos hammados, made from the recipe in the "Sephardi" cookbook by Hélène Jawhara Piñer

The origins of haminados, or braised eggs, are rooted in the Jewish culinary traditions of Medieval Spain. During this period, eggs were a staple in daily diets and held significant symbolic meaning within Jewish culture, representing various aspects of life such as creation, mourning, and celebration.

Hélène Jawhara Piñer notes that during the Spanish Inquisition, traditional Jewish foods such as haminados were used as evidence against New Christians (converted Jews) for secretly adhering to Judaism. For instance, in 1490, Pedro Martínez from Soria was denounced for consuming red eggs during Lent, a period that coincided with the Jewish holiday of Passover. Later, in 1505, Alvaro de Luna was tried in Almazán after witnesses reported that he ate red eggs on Fridays and during Lent.

== Description ==
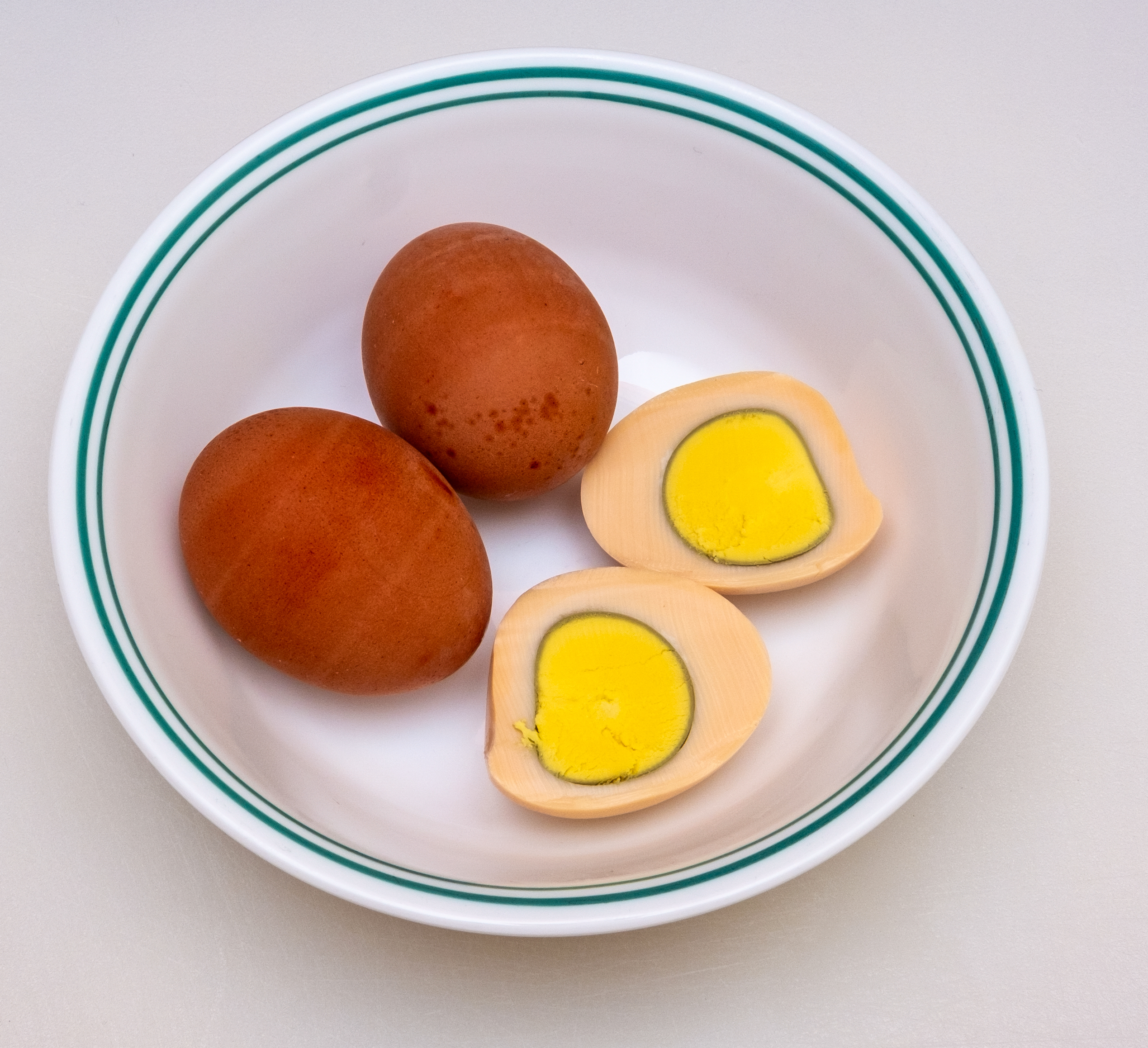
Haminados, braised separately with coffee, onion skins. Shelled (L) and unshelled (R).

Haminados typically consists of whole eggs in the shell, which are placed on top of a hamin (a Shabbat stew) in the stewing pot. The eggs are braised over many hours, often overnight and turn brown in the course of all-night cooking. The brown eggs are shelled before serving and placed on top of the other cooked ingredients. In the Tunisian version, the brown eggs are cooked separately in a metal pot on the all-night stove with water and tea leaves (similar to tea eggs). Some versions use only salt and water, but the eggs still brown, likely due to Maillard reactions. Haminados can be cooked in this way even if no hamin is prepared. The addition of tea leaves, coffee grinds, or onion skins to the water dyes the shell purple and enhances browning of the egg white. In Israel, brown eggs are a popular accompaniment to ful medames (a dish of mashed broad beans) and they may also be served with hummus (a dip of mashed chickpeas mixed with tahini) and in a sabich sandwich.

== See also ==
- Hardboiled egg
- Hamin
- Poached egg
- Sabich
