= Wheat berry =

Whole wheat kernel without the husk

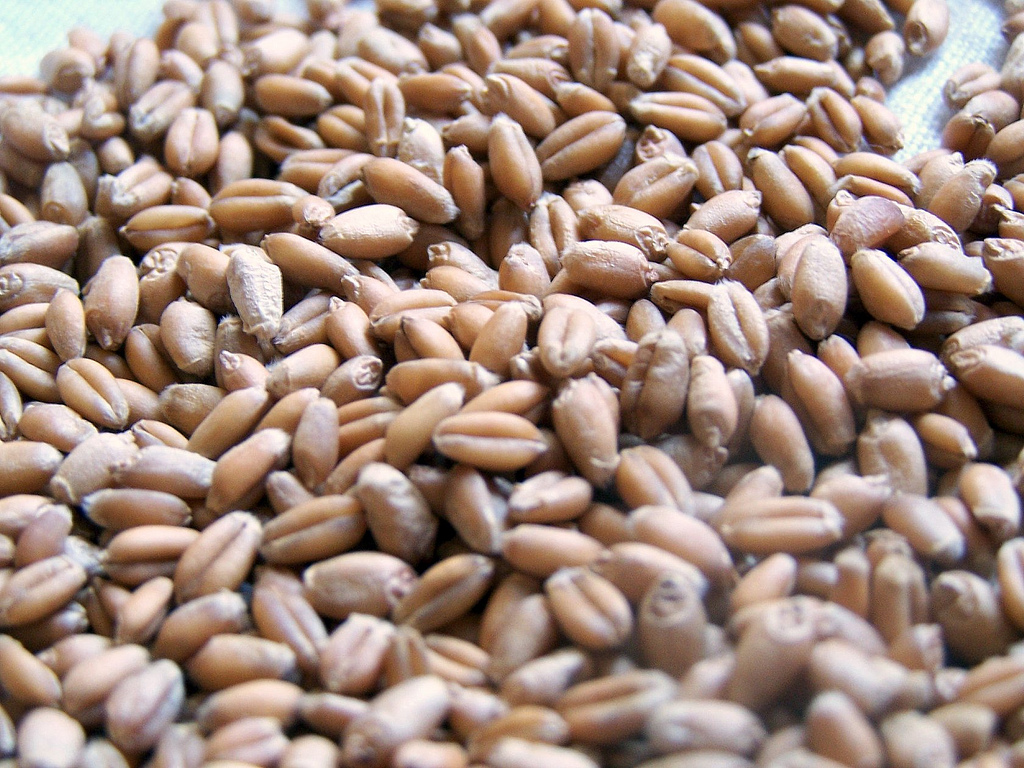
Uncooked wheat berries

A wheat berry, or wheatberry, is a whole wheat kernel, composed of the bran, germ, and endosperm, without the husk. Botanically, it is a type of fruit called a caryopsis. Wheat berries are eaten as a grain, have a tan to reddish-brown color, and can vary in gluten and protein content from 6–9% ("soft") to 10–14% ("hard"). They are often added to salads or baked into bread to add a chewy texture. If wheat berries are milled, whole-wheat flour is produced. Wheat berries are similar to barley, rye, and kamut.

Wheat berries are the primary ingredient in an Eastern European Christmas porridge called kutia. In France, cooked durum wheat berries are commonly eaten as a side dish instead of rice or corn. This side dish is often called ebly, from the name of the first brand of prepared wheat berries. In Romania and other Eastern European countries, the wheat berries (arpacas) are used in a special sweet dish called koliva for Christian Orthodox ritual.

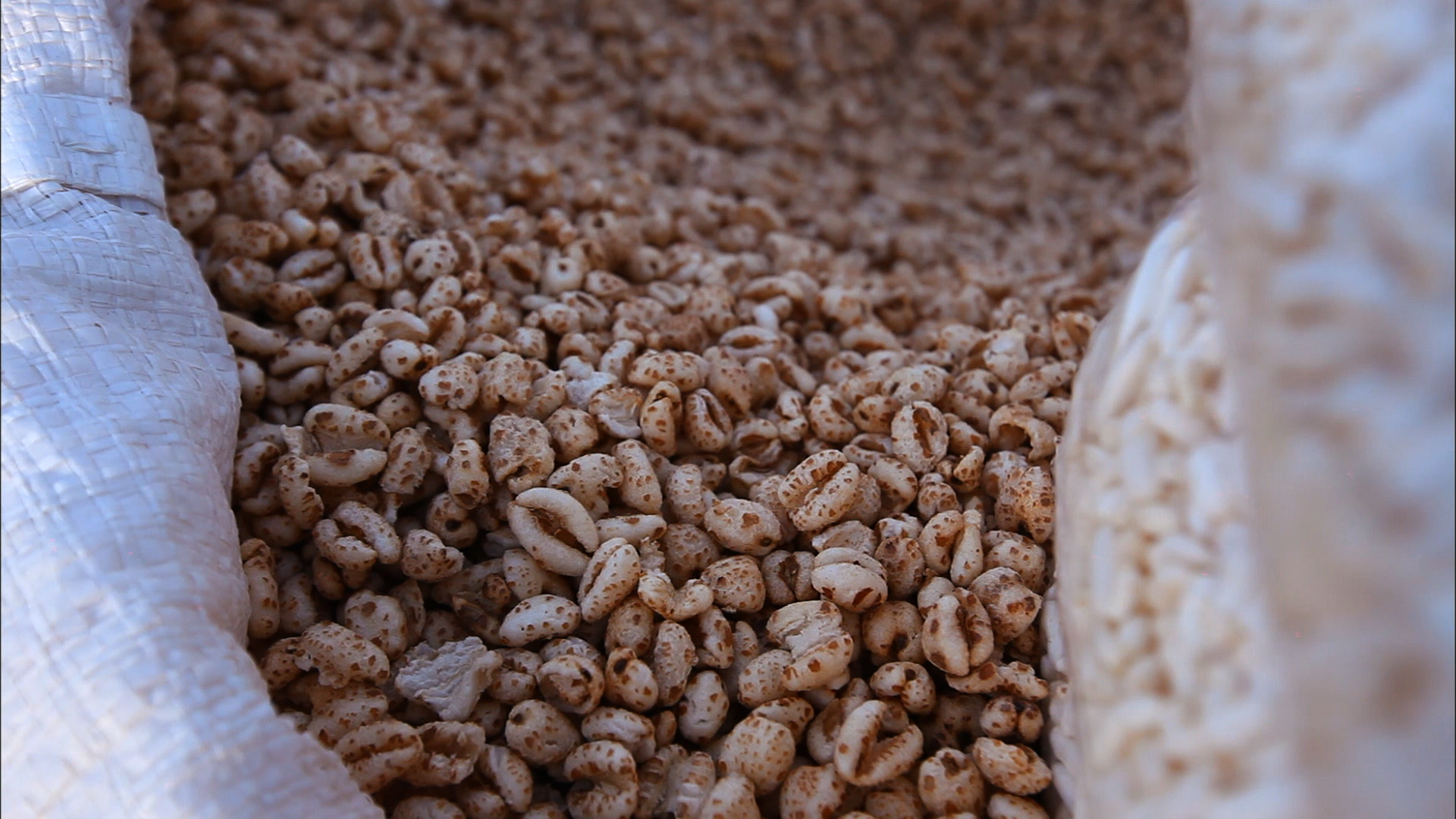
Puffed wheat berries

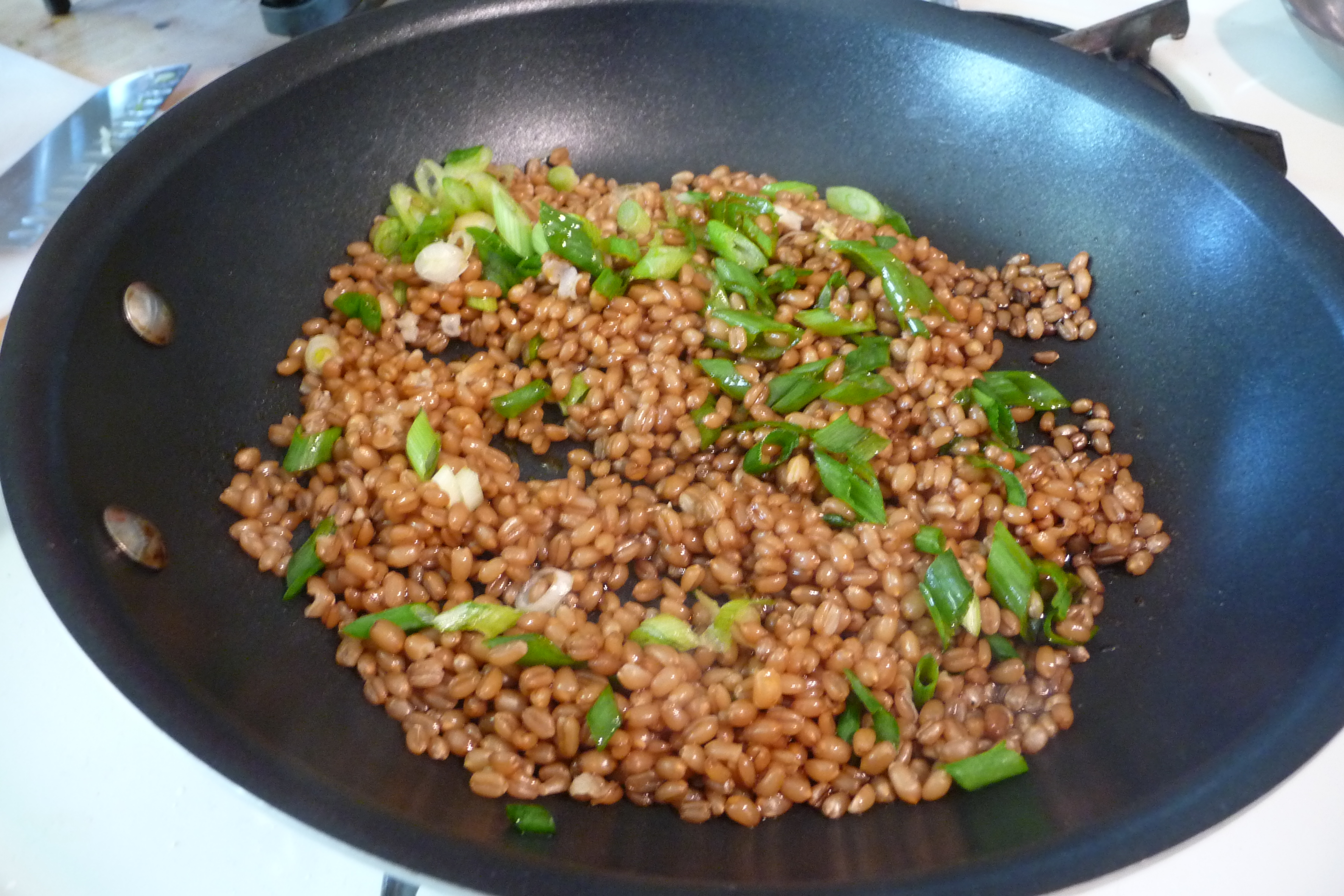
Wheat berries cooking - soaked then sauteed with spring onion

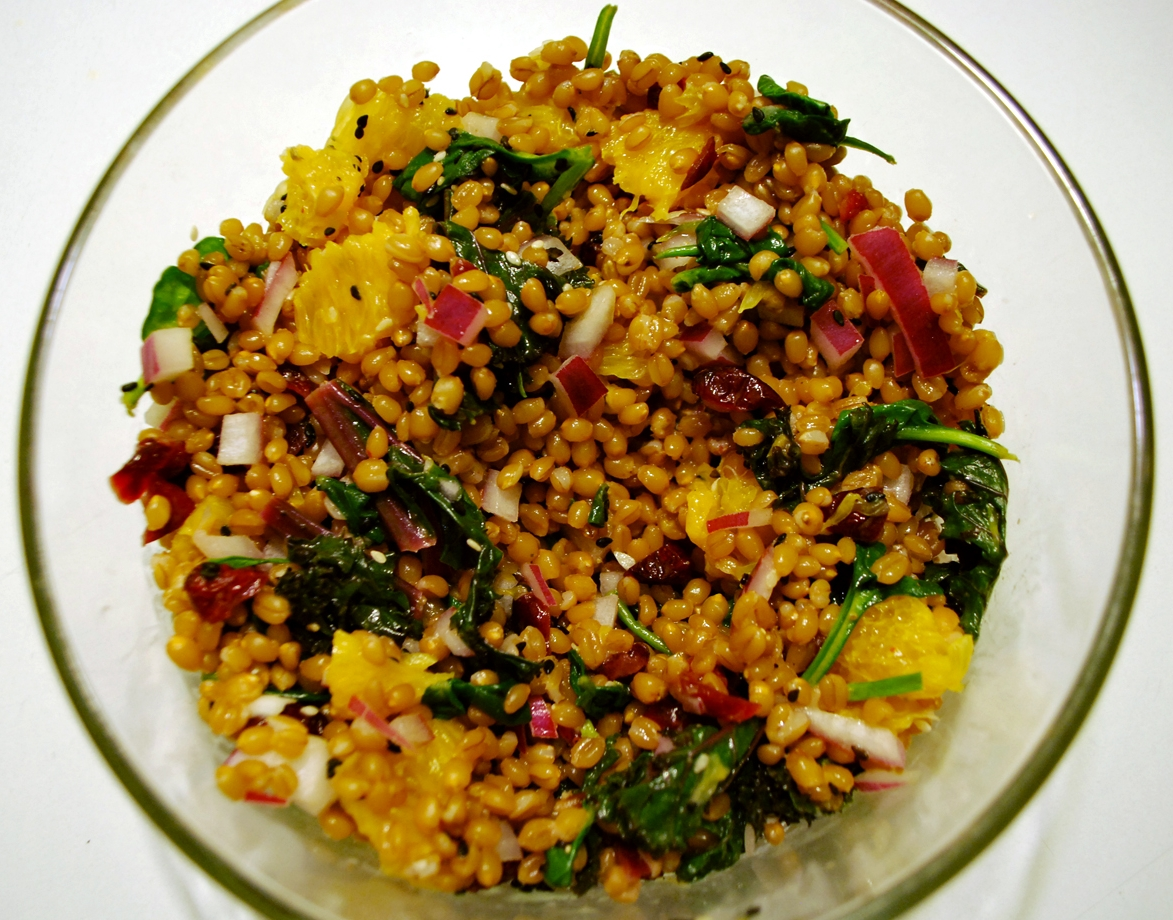
A salad prepared with wheat berries

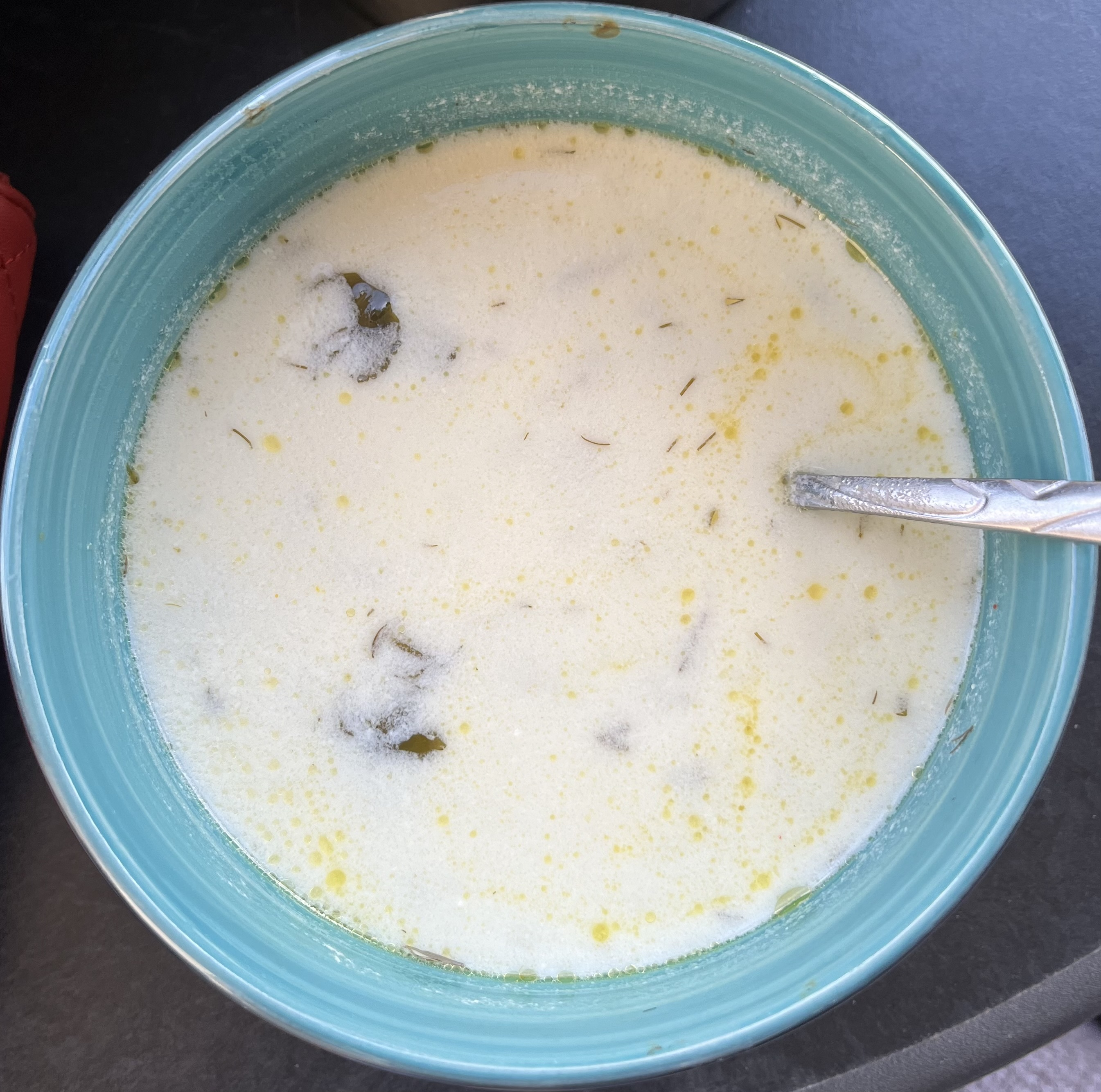
An Armenian soup with wheat berries and yogurt

== See also ==
- Cuccìa, a Sicilian wheat berry dish
- Bulgur, another whole wheat preparation
- Frumenty, a dish made with boiled wheat berries
- Graham flour
- Borș, a fermented drink made from sprouted grain
- Farro
