= Navy bean =

Variety of the common bean

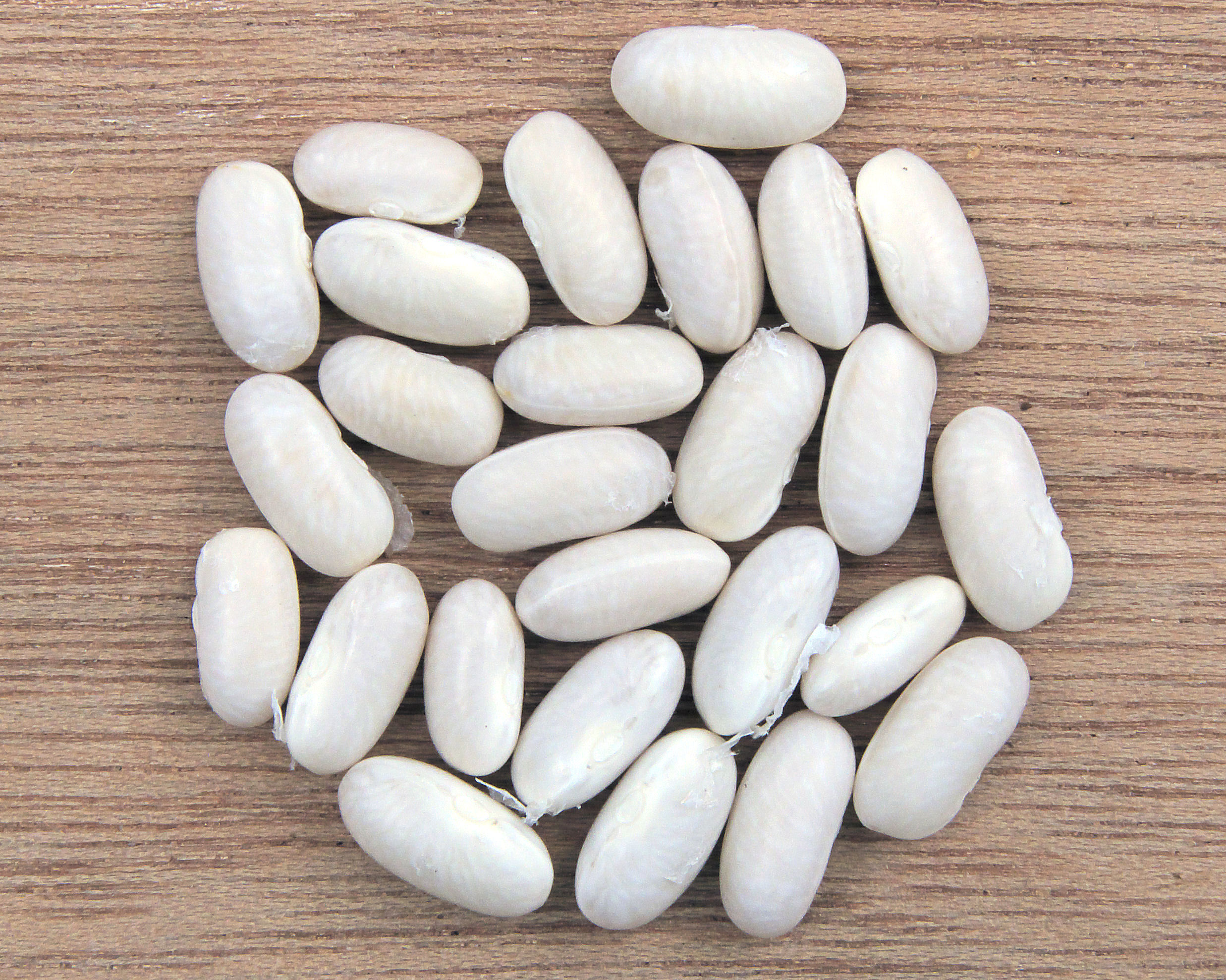
- Species: Phaseolus vulgaris

The navy bean, haricot bean, Jigna bean, pearl haricot bean, Boston bean, white pea bean, or pea bean is a variety of the common bean (Phaseolus vulgaris) native to the Americas, where it was first domesticated. It is a dry white bean that is smaller than many other types of white beans, and has an oval, slightly flattened shape. It features in such dishes as baked beans, various soups such as Senate bean soup, and bean pies.

The plants that produce navy beans may be either of the bush type or vining type, depending on the cultivar.

== History ==
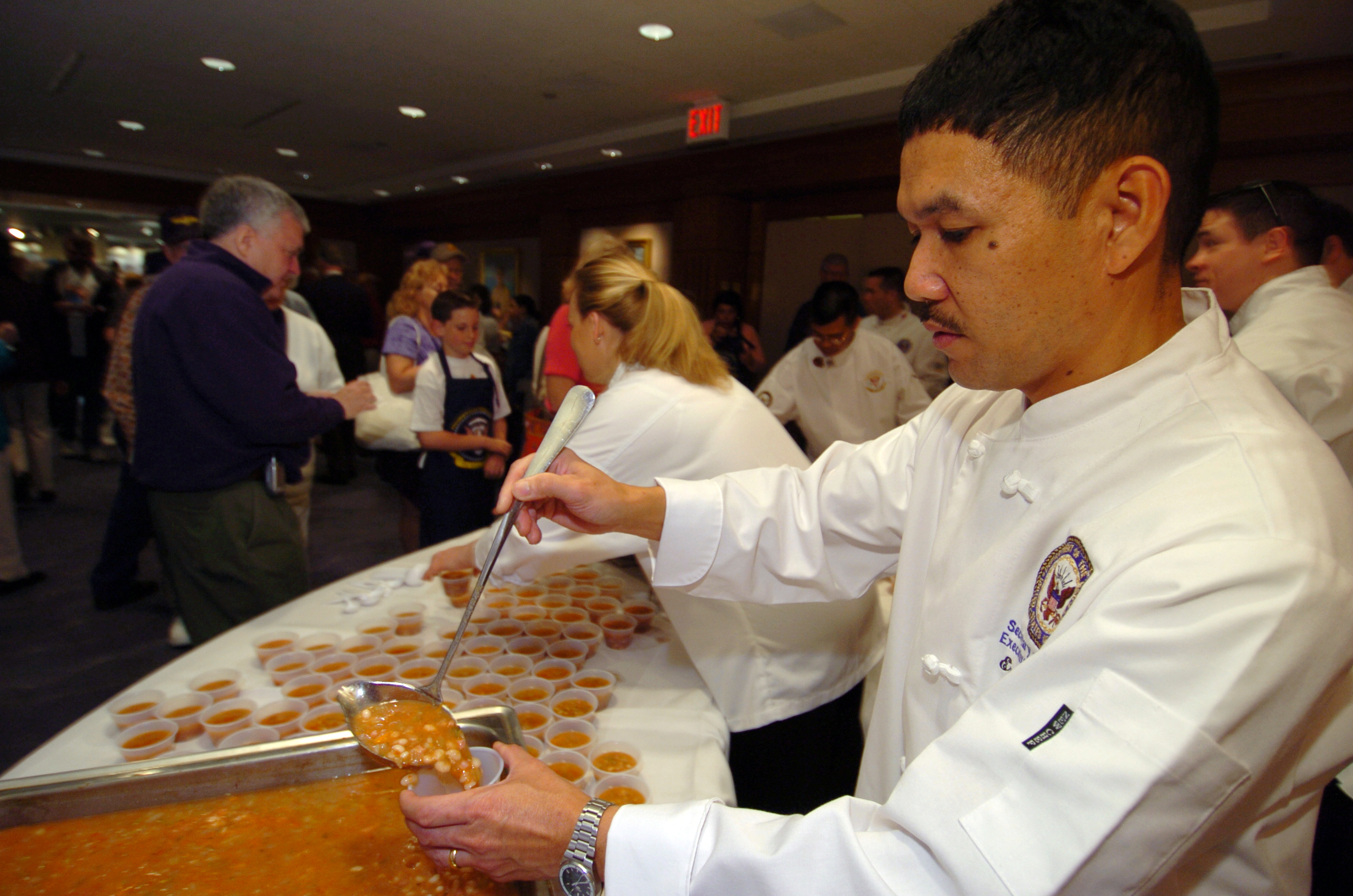
Navy beans being served at the Navy Memorial (2007)

The name "Navy bean" is an American term coined because the US Navy has served the beans as a staple to its sailors since the mid-1800s.

In Australia, navy bean production began during World War II when it became necessary to find an economical way of supplying a nutritious food to the many troops—especially American troops—based in Queensland. The United States military maintained a large base in Kingaroy and had many bases and camps throughout south-east Queensland. It actively encouraged the widespread planting of the beans. Kingaroy is known as the Baked Bean Capital of Australia. Another popular name for the bean during this time was "the Yankee bean".

== Cultivars ==
Navy bean cultivars include:

- Rainy River
- Robust, resistant to the bean common mosaic virus, which is transmitted through seeds
- Michelite, descended from Robust, but with higher yields and better seed quality
- Sanilac, the first bush navy bean cultivar

== Nutrition ==
Navy beans, boiled, unsalted
Nutritional value per 100 g (3.5 oz)
- Energy: 140 kcal (590 kJ)
- Carbohydrates: 26 g
- Dietary fiber: 10.5 g
- Fat: 0.62 g
- Protein: 8.23 g
Vitamins and minerals
Vitamins	Quantity %DV^{†}
Thiamine (B1)	20% 0.237 mg
Riboflavin (B2)	5% 0.066 mg
Niacin (B3)	4% 0.649 mg
Pantothenic acid (B5)	5% 0.266 mg
Vitamin B6	8% 0.138 mg
Folate (B9)	35% 140 μg
Vitamin K	1% 0.6 μg
Minerals	Quantity %DV^{†}
Calcium	5% 69 mg
Copper	23% 0.21 mg
Iron	13% 2.36 mg
Magnesium	13% 53 mg
Manganese	23% 0.527 mg
Phosphorus	12% 144 mg
Potassium	13% 389 mg
Zinc	9% 1.03 mg
- Other constituents: Quantity
- Water: 63.8 g
- Link to Nutrient Report at USDA FoodData Central
- ^{†}Percentages estimated using US recommendations for adults, except for potassium, which is estimated based on expert recommendation from the National Academies

Cooked (boiled) navy beans are 64% water, 26% carbohydrates, 8% protein, and less than 1% fat (table). In a reference amount of 100 g (3.5 oz), cooked navy beans supply 140 calories of food energy, 10 g (0.35 oz) of dietary fiber, and are a rich source (20% or more of the Daily Value, DV) of folate, thiamine, copper, and manganese (20-35% DV). They are a moderate source (10-19% DV) of several dietary minerals (table).

== Phytochemicals ==
White bean phytochemicals include phosphatidylserine, apigenin, saponins, ferulic acid, and p-coumaric acid.

== Storage and safety ==
Dried and canned beans stay fresh longer by storing them in a pantry or other cool, dark place under 75 °F (24 °C). With normal seed storage, seeds should last from one to four years for replanting. Seeds stored under good conditions can be stored almost indefinitely before cooking. Beans that are discolored from the pure white color should be avoided, as they may have been poorly handled while they dried.

== See also ==
- Aquafaba
