= Blech =

Metal sheet used to cover stove top burners on Shabbat

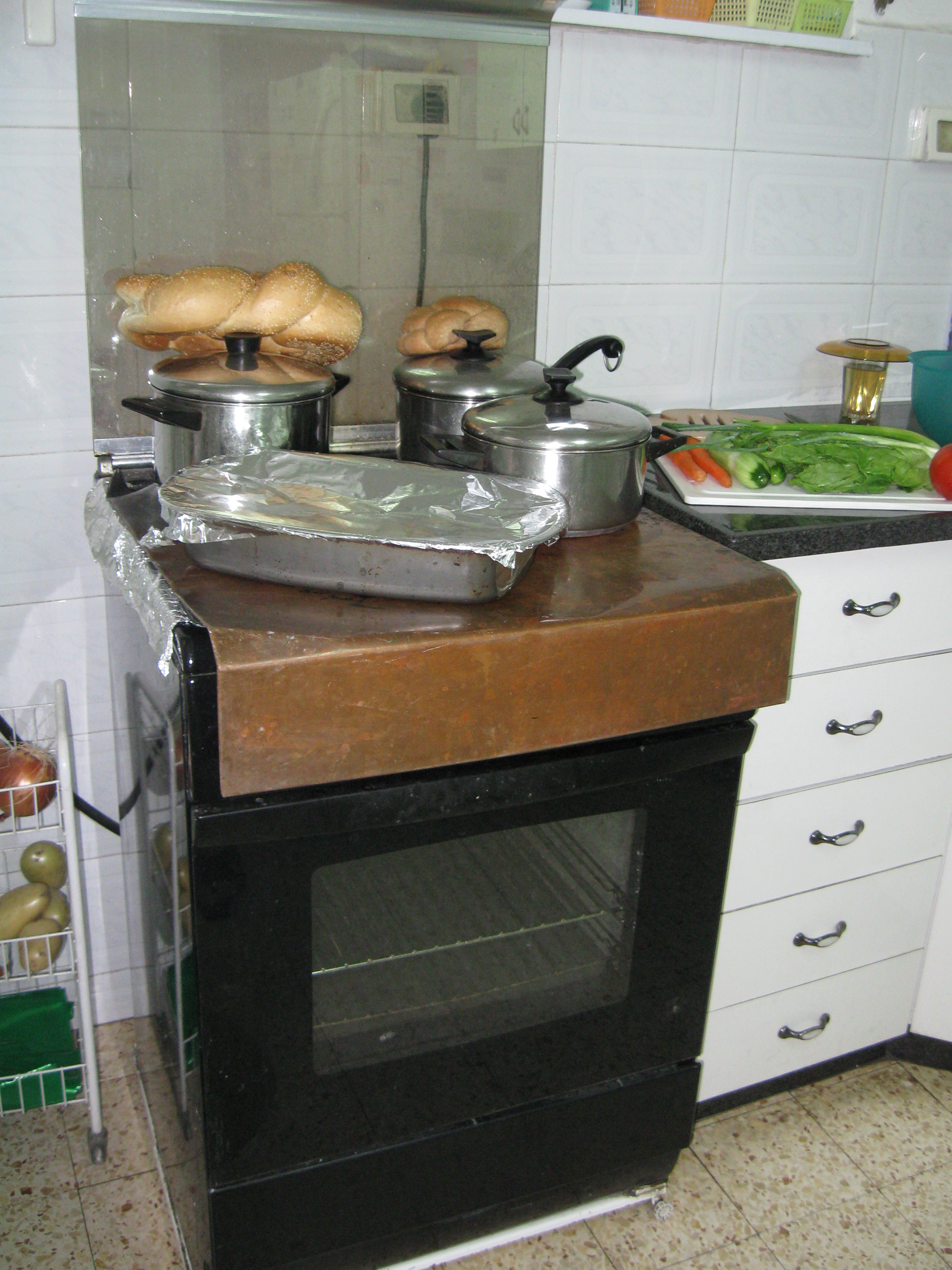
A copper blech covers the lit burners on a stovetop, keeping food warm for the Shabbos meal.

A blech (from the Yiddish word בלעך (blekh) meaning "tin" or "sheet metal", alternatively from Middle High German or Standard German "Blech", meaning tin or sheet metal) is a metal sheet used by many observant Jews to cover stovetop burners (and for some, the cooker's knobs and dials) on Shabbat, as part of the precautions taken to avoid violating the halachic prohibition against cooking on the Sabbath.

== Common use ==
Rabbi Fishel Jacobs' The Blech Book—The Complete & Illustrated Guide To Shabbos Hotplates gives the following guidelines:

- The food (including water) intended for Shabbos use should be completely cooked.
- The stove's gas flames or electric coils are turned on. The blech is placed over these. Alternatively, the Shabbos hot plate, which needs no blech (when it is the type which has no knobs to adjust the heat level) is plugged in.
- The pot is placed on the blech. It is permissible to place another pot on this one.
- The pot on the blech, or another pot which has been placed on it, may be covered with a blanket, clothing, towel, cloth, etc., to keep the heat from dissipating. One side of the pot should be left partially uncovered.

During Shabbos, the pots are removed according to need. After removal, it is permissible to return the pot onto the blech, following these guidelines:

- The pot should be removed from the blech with the intention to replace it afterwards and held at all times, not leaned onto any surface. (A heavy or unwieldy pot may be partially leaned on a surface, while being held, if there is no alternative.)
- The food must be in the same pot, completely cooked, and has retained at least some of its original heat.

The permissibility of blech (and unblech, below) and the acceptable manner of their use is questioned by several modern kashrut organizations; however, the use of a blech to reheat food on the Sabbath remains very popular among observant Jews.

== Unblech ==
An unblech, or K'Deira Blech (lit. "pot blech", commonly referred to as "water blech"), is also used to heat up pre-cooked food on the Sabbath, but utilizes different halakhic mechanisms from a standard blech. An unblech consists of a shallow metal pan filled with hot water and covered by another metal pan, and thus is akin to a double boiler for halakhic purposes. As such, it may be more flexible than a standard blech for halachic purposes. However, the temperature of an unblech is limited by the boiling point of water and is not as hot as a typical blech.

== Fire safety ==
In 2015, a house fire caused by a faulty Sabbath hot plate killed seven children in Brooklyn. The 2015 fire was preceded by at least four other Sabbath fires in Brooklyn in the past 15 years caused by appliances for heating food being left on or candles burning during the Jewish Sabbath in order to comply with Orthodox interpretation of Jewish Law. In 2005, three children died in a fire in Williamsburg, Brooklyn, caused when stove burners were left on during Passover. After the 2015 fire, the New York City Fire Department distributed a pamphlet titled "Fire Safety for Jewish Observances" to nearby homes. In response to the fire, many Jewish Brooklyn residents purchased smoke detectors before the following Sabbath.

== See also ==
- Cholent
- Cooking on Shabbat
