= Mohn bar =

Ashkenazi Jewish baked good

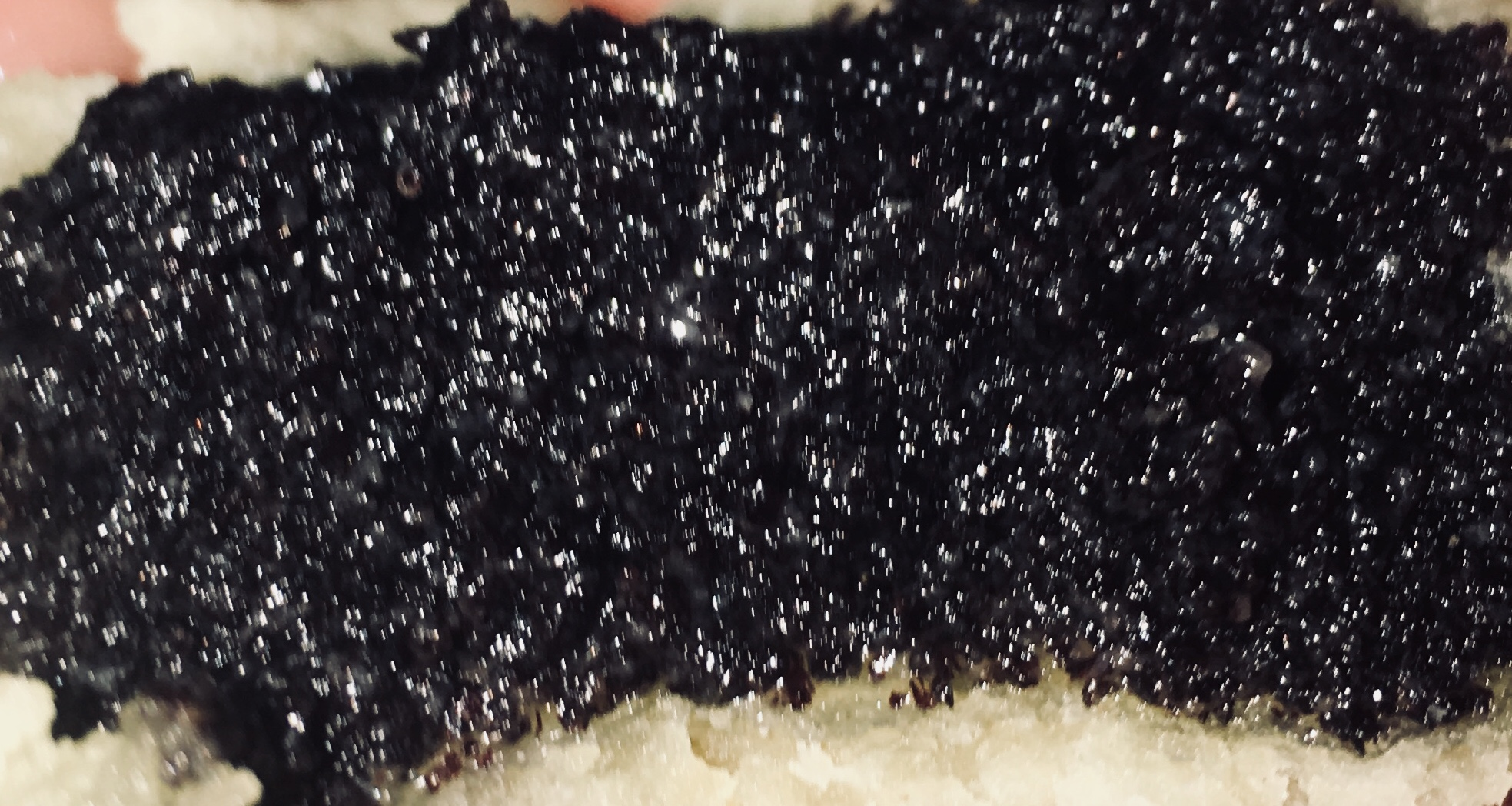
- Mohn bar
- Alternative names: Muhn bar, mon bar, mun bar, poppy seed bar, poppy seed blondie
- Type: Baked good, bar or pastry
- Course: Dessert or breakfast
- Place of origin: Ashkenazi Jewish communities
- Main ingredients: Flour, poppy seeds, sugar, egg, oil or butter, streusel or crumb topping

Mohn bar, also known as mon bar, or poppy seed bar, is an Ashkenazi Jewish baked good consisting of a shortcrust pastry base with a sweet mohn (poppy seed) filling, and a streusel/crumb topping. It may be commonly found at kosher bakeries and Jewish delis across the United States.

== History ==
Mohn bars originate from the shtetl, or the villages inhabited by Ashkenazi Jews in Eastern Europe from the Middle Ages until the decimation of European Jewry in the Holocaust. Jewish refugees fleeing antisemitic persecution in Europe brought with them their traditional foods, including the mohn bar. Mohn bars were a very popular baked good in the Jewish community of the United States until the late 20th century, as their popularity declined due to the advent of newer baked goods containing fillings such as chocolate and jam. They are still made in many Jewish bakeries in the United States and across the Jewish diaspora, as well as in Israel.

== Overview ==
Mohn bars consist of a pastry or cookie dough that has been filled or topped with mohn, a Jewish poppy seed filling commonly used in baked goods such as hamantash and babka, and topped with a sweet crumb topping which is then baked, allowed to cool and sliced into bars similar to a lemon bar and served cool at room temperature for breakfast or dessert.

== Preparation ==
A mohn bar generally uses a shortcrust pastry dough similar to that used for shortbread or hamantash that is most often pareve (non-dairy), though sometimes it is made with a dairy dough containing butter. The dough is rolled out to approximately 1/4-1/2 an inch in thickness and placed in a baking dish. A filling of sweetened, cooked ground poppy seeds called mohn is spread on top of the dough, and then a crumb or streusel topping is distributed on top. Sometimes the mohn filling may be covered with an additional layer of dough, similar to a fig newton. The mohn bar is then baked and once it is finished baking it is allowed to cool and is dusted with powdered sugar and then sliced into individual "bars".

== Availability ==
Mohn bars are sold at Jewish bakeries, delis, and restaurants across the United States, but particularly in the Northeast, Southern California, and South Florida regions. Packaged versions may be found in grocery stores in these regions, as well as at kosher markets across the country, and are sold by brands such as "Green's" and "Beigel Bakery", among others.

== See also ==
- Mohn kichel
- Hamantash
- Rugelach
- Babka
