= Jewish cuisine =

Jewish culinary traditions

Jewish cuisine refers to the worldwide cooking traditions of the Jewish people. During its evolution over the course of many centuries, it has been shaped by Jewish dietary laws (kashrut), Jewish festivals and holidays, and traditions centred around Shabbat. Jewish cuisine is influenced by the economics, agriculture, and culinary traditions of the many countries in which Jewish communities were displaced and varies widely throughout the entire world.

The history of Jewish cuisine begins with the cuisine of the ancient Israelites. As the Jewish diaspora grew, different styles of Jewish cooking developed. The distinctive styles in Jewish cuisine vary according to each community across the Ashkenazi, Sephardi, and Mizrahi diaspora groupings.

Since the establishment of the State of Israel in 1948, and particularly since the late 1970s, a nascent Israeli "fusion cuisine" has developed. Israeli cuisine has adapted a multitude of elements, overlapping techniques and ingredients from the many culinary traditions of the Jewish diaspora.

== Influences on Jewish cuisine ==
=== Kashrut—Jewish dietary laws ===
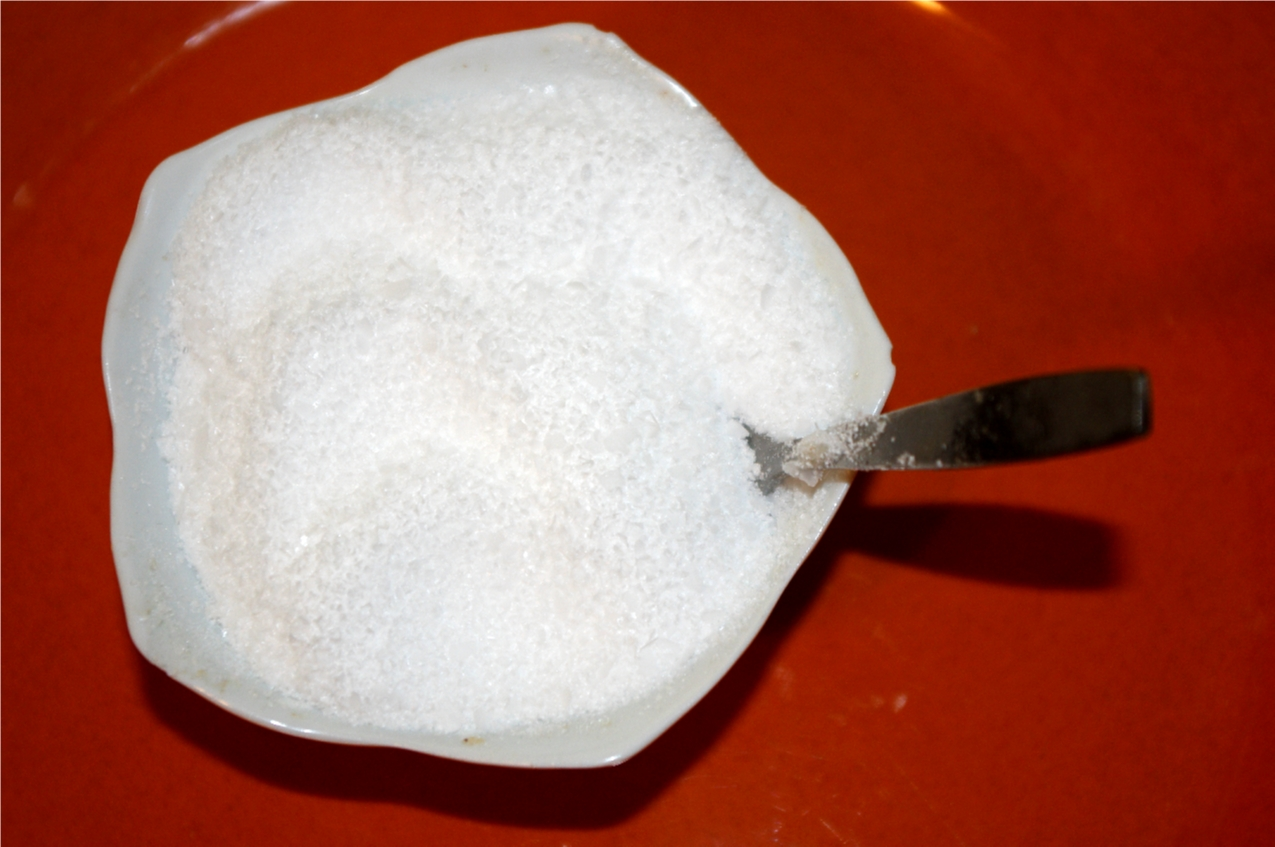
Coarse salt for koshering meat

The laws of keeping kosher (kashrut) have influenced Jewish cooking by prescribing what foods are permitted and how food must be prepared.

Certain foods, notably pork, shellfish, and almost all insects are forbidden; meat and dairy cannot be eaten together in one dish and a certain period of time must elapse before dairy food can be eaten following a meat dish. The length of time depends on a specific minhag (tradition). It is most common to wait six hours but some groups wait three or one. Meat must be ritually slaughtered and salted to remove all traces of blood.

Observant Jews will eat only meat or poultry that is certified kosher. The meat has to have been slaughtered by a shochet (ritual slaughterer) in accordance with Jewish law and must be entirely drained of blood. Before it is cooked, it is soaked in water for half an hour, then placed on a perforated board, sprinkled with coarse salt (which draws out the blood) and left to sit for one hour. At the end of this time, the salt is washed off and the meat is ready for cooking.

Today, kosher meats purchased from a butcher or supermarket have already undergone the koshering process as described in the previous paragraph and no additional soaking or salting is required.

According to kashrut, meat and poultry must not be eaten with dairy products, nor may they be eaten from plates or with utensils that have been used with dairy products. Therefore, Jews who strictly observe kashrut divide their kitchens into different sections for meat and for dairy, with separate ovens, plates and utensils (or as much as is reasonable, given financial and space constraints; there are procedures to kasher utensils that have touched dairy to allow their use for meat). As a result, butter, milk, and cream are not used in preparing dishes made with meat or intended to be served together with meat. Oil, pareve margarine, rendered chicken fat (often called schmaltz in the Ashkenazi tradition), or non-dairy cream substitutes are used instead.

Despite religious prohibitions, some foods not generally considered kosher have made their way into traditional Jewish cuisine; sturgeon, which was consumed by European Jews at least as far back as the 19th century, is one example.

=== Geographical dispersion ===
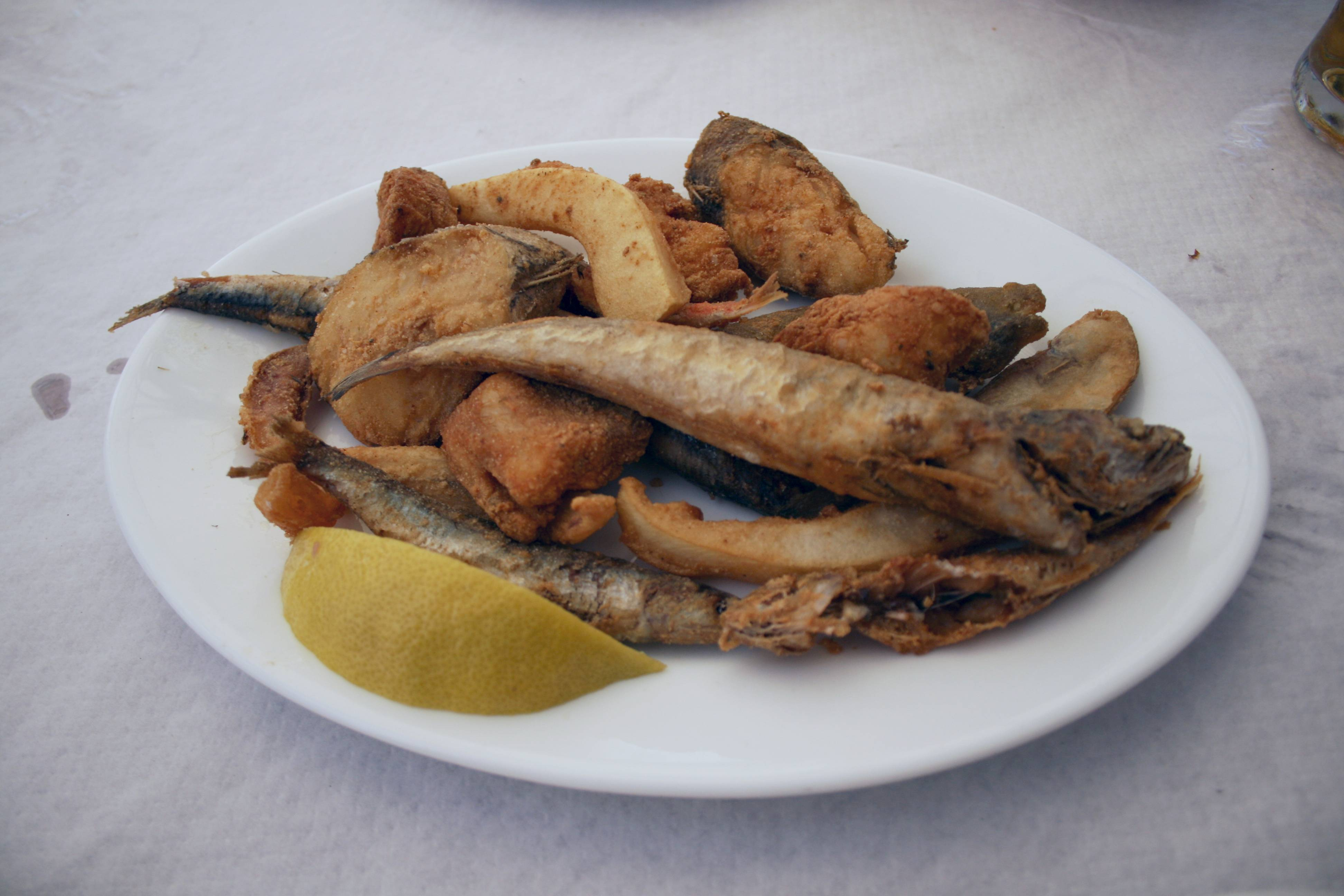
Pescaíto frito, originating from the 16th-century Andalusian Jews of Spain and Portugal

The hearty cuisine of Ashkenazi Jews was based on centuries of living in the cold climate of Central and Eastern Europe, whereas the lighter, "sunnier" cuisine of Sephardi Jews was influenced by life in the Mediterranean region.

Each Jewish community has its traditional dishes, often revolving around specialties from their home country. In Spain and Portugal, olives are a common ingredient and many foods are fried in oil. The idea of frying fish in the stereotypically British fish and chips, for example, was introduced to Britain by Sephardic Jewish immigrants.

== History of Jewish cuisine ==
=== Biblical era ===
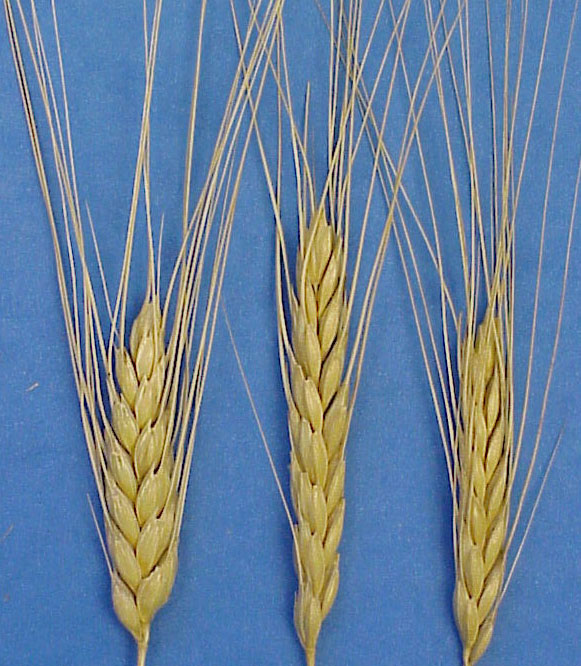
Emmer wheat, cultivated in biblical times

The daily diet of the average ancient Israelite consisted mainly of bread, cooked grains and legumes. Bread was eaten with every meal. The bread eaten until the end of the Israelite monarchy was mostly made from barley flour.

During the Second Temple era, bread made from wheat flour became predominant. A variety of breads was produced. Probably most common were unleavened flat loaves called ugah or kikkar. Another type was a thin wafer, known as a rakik. A thicker loaf, known as hallah, was made with the best-quality flour, usually for ritual purposes. Bread was sometimes enriched by the addition of flour from legumes (Ezekiel 4:9).

The Mishna (Hallah 2:2) mentions bread dough made with fruit juice instead of water to sweeten the bread. The Israelites also sometimes added fennel and cumin to bread dough for flavor and dipped their bread in vinegar (Ruth 2:14), olive oil, or sesame oil for extra flavor.

Vegetables played a smaller, but significant role in the diet. Legumes and vegetables were typically eaten in stews. Stews made of lentils or beans were common and they were cooked with onion, garlic, and leeks for flavor. Fresh legumes were also roasted, or dried and stored for extended periods, then cooked in a soup or a stew. Vegetables were also eaten uncooked with bread. Lentils were the most important of the legumes and were used to make pottages and soups, as well as fried lentil cakes called ashishim.

The Israelites drank goat and sheep's milk when it was available in the spring and summer and ate butter and cheese. They also ate honey, both from bees and date honey.

Figs and grapes were the fruits most commonly eaten, while dates, pomegranates, almonds, and other fruits and nuts were eaten more occasionally.

Wine was the most popular beverage and sometimes other fermented beverages were produced.

Meat, usually goat and mutton, was eaten rarely by most Israelites and reserved for special occasions, such as celebrations, festival meals, or sacrificial feasts. The wealthy ate meat more frequently and had beef, venison, and veal available to them.

Olives were used primarily for their oil, which was used raw and to cook meat and stews. Game (usually deer and gazelle), birds, eggs, and fish were also eaten, depending on availability. Meat was typically prepared in broths or stews, and sometimes roasted. For long-term storage, meat was smoked, dried, or salted.

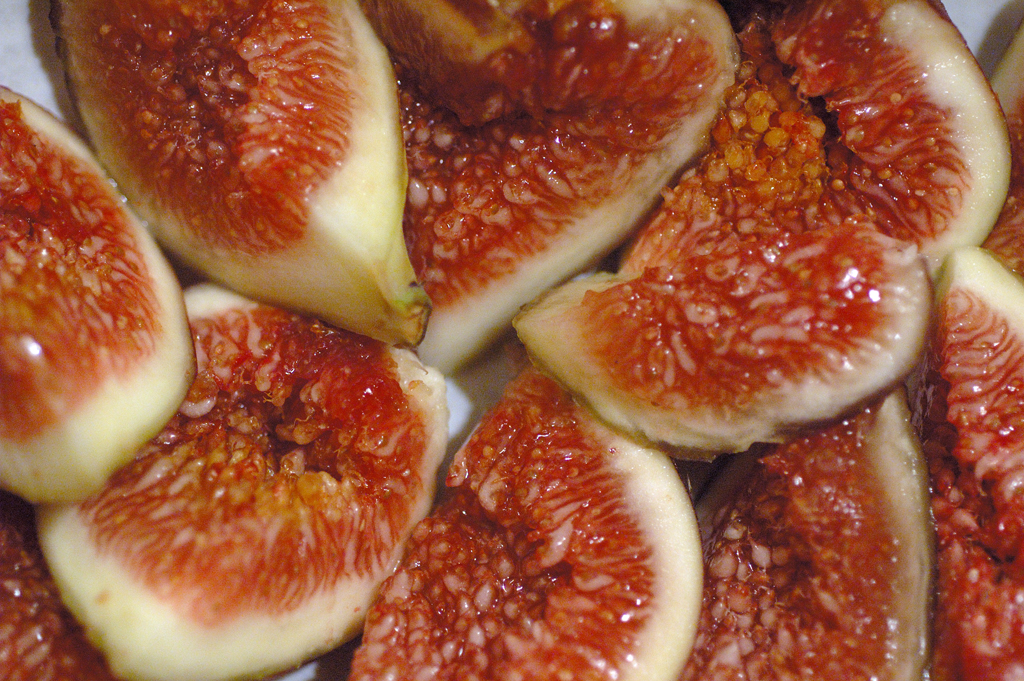
Figs, one of the most frequently mentioned fruits in the Bible

Porridge and gruel were made from ground grain, water, salt, and butter. This mixture also formed the basis for cakes, to which oil, called shemen, and fruits were sometimes added before baking.

Most food was eaten fresh and in season. Fruits and vegetables had to be eaten as they ripened and before they spoiled.

People had to contend with periodic episodes of hunger and famine. Producing enough food required hard and well-timed labor and the climatic conditions resulted in unpredictable harvests and the need to store as much food as possible. Thus, grapes were made into raisins and wine, olives were made into oil, figs, beans and lentils were dried and grains were stored for use throughout the year.

As fresh milk tended to spoil quickly, the Israelites stored milk in skin containers that caused it to curdle quickly and drank it as thick sour milk which they called laban.

The Israelites ate a variety of fresh and saltwater fish, according to both archaeological and textual evidence. Remains of freshwater fish from the Yarkon and Jordan rivers and the Sea of Galilee have been found in excavations, and include St. Peter’s fish and mouthbreeders. Saltwater fish discovered in excavations include sea bream, grouper, meager, and gray mullet. Most of these come from the Mediterranean Sea, but in the later Iron Age period, some are from the Red Sea. Although the Torah prohibits the consumption of fish without fins or scales, archeological evidence indicates that many Israelites flouted or were unaware of these restrictions and ate non-kosher seafood, mostly catfish but also shark, eel, and ray, and that religious restrictions on seafood began to be observed more strictly starting in the first century CE.

Descriptions of typical Israelite meals appear in the Bible. The Book of Samuel described the rations Abigail brought to David's group: bread loaves, wine, butchered sheep, parched grain, raisins, and fig cakes. The Book of Ruth described a typical light breakfast: bread dipped in vinegar and parched or roasted grain.

The cuisine maintained many consistent traits based on the main products available from the early Israelite period until the Roman period, even though new foods became available during this extended time. For example, rice was introduced during the Persian era.

During the Hellenistic period, as trade with the Nabateans increased, more spices became available, at least for those who could afford them and more Mediterranean fish were imported into the cities. During the Roman period, sugar cane was introduced.

The symbolic food of the ancient Israelites continued to be important among Jews after the destruction of the Second Temple in 70 CE and the beginning of the Jewish diaspora.

Bread, wine and olive oil were seen as direct links to the three main crops of ancient Israel—wheat, grapes and olives. In the Bible, this trio is described as representing the divine response to human needs (Hosea 2:23–24) and, particularly, the need for the seasonal rains vital for the successful cultivation of these three crops. (Deuteronomy 11:13–14).

The significance of wine, bread and oil is indicated by their incorporation into Jewish religious ritual, with the blessings over wine and bread for Shabbat and holiday meals and at religious ceremonies such as weddings and the lighting of Shabbat and festival lights with olive oil.

Modern Jewish cooking originated in the various communities of the Jewish diaspora, and modern Jewish cuisine bears little resemblance to what the ancient Israelites ate. However, a few dishes that originated in ancient Israel survive to the present day. Notably among them are Sabbath stews, stews traditionally eaten on Shabbat that are simmered for 12 hours in a way that conforms with Shabbat restrictions. Such stews date to at least the Second Temple period. Various diaspora communities created their own variations of the dish based on their local climate and available ingredients, which are eaten today. Modern examples of such stews are cholent and hamin.

Other foods dating to the ancient Israelites include pastels, or Shabbat meat pies, and charoset, a sweet fruit and nut paste eaten at the Passover Seder.

=== Talmudic era ===
Bread was a staple food and as in the Hebrew Bible, the meal is designated by the simple term "to eat bread", so the rabbinical law ordains that the blessing pronounced upon bread covers everything else except wine and dessert. Bread was made not only from wheat, but also from barley, rice, millet, lentils, etc.

Many kinds of fruit were eaten. There was a custom to eat apples during Shavuot, while specific fruit and herbs were eaten on holidays and special occasions such as Rosh Hashana. Children received nuts and roasted ears of grain especially on the evening of Passover. Olives were so common that they were used as a measure (zayit).

Meat was eaten only on special occasions, on Shabbat and at feasts. The pious kept fine cattle for Shabbat (Beẓah 16a), but various other kinds of dishes, relishes and spices were also on the table. Deer, also, furnished meat, as did pheasant, chickens and pigeons.

Fermented fish sauce was an important article of commerce, being called "garum" among the Jews, as among the Greeks and Romans. Pliny says expressly of a "garum castimoniale" (i.e., kosher garum) that it was prepared according to Jewish law. A specific type of locust was eaten. Eggs were so commonly eaten that the quantity of an egg was used as a measure.

While pork was prohibited by Jewish laws as described under kashrut, the refusal to eat pork only became central to Jewish identity while under Roman rule. Pork consumption during the Roman period increased and became closely affiliated with Romans not only as a common cuisine but also as a frequently sacrificed animal. Jordan Rosenblum has argued that by not consuming pork, Jews maintained their sense of particularity and even held a silent revolt against the Roman Empire.

==== Structure of meal ====
The first dish was a pickled starter to stimulate the appetite, followed by the main meal, which ended with a dessert, called in Greek θάργημα. Afiḳomen is used in the same sense. Tidbits (parperet) were eaten before and after the meal (Ber. vi. 6).

Wine was flavored with myrrh or with honey and pepper, the mixture being called conditum. There was vinegar wine, wine from Amanus and Cilicia, red wine from Saron, Ethiopian wine, and black wine. Certain wines were considered good for the stomach, others not. There was beer from Egypt called zythos (Pes. iii. 1) and beer made from a thorn Spina regia.

Emphasis was placed on drinking with the meal as eating without drinking (any liquid) causes stomach trouble.

=== Middle Ages ===
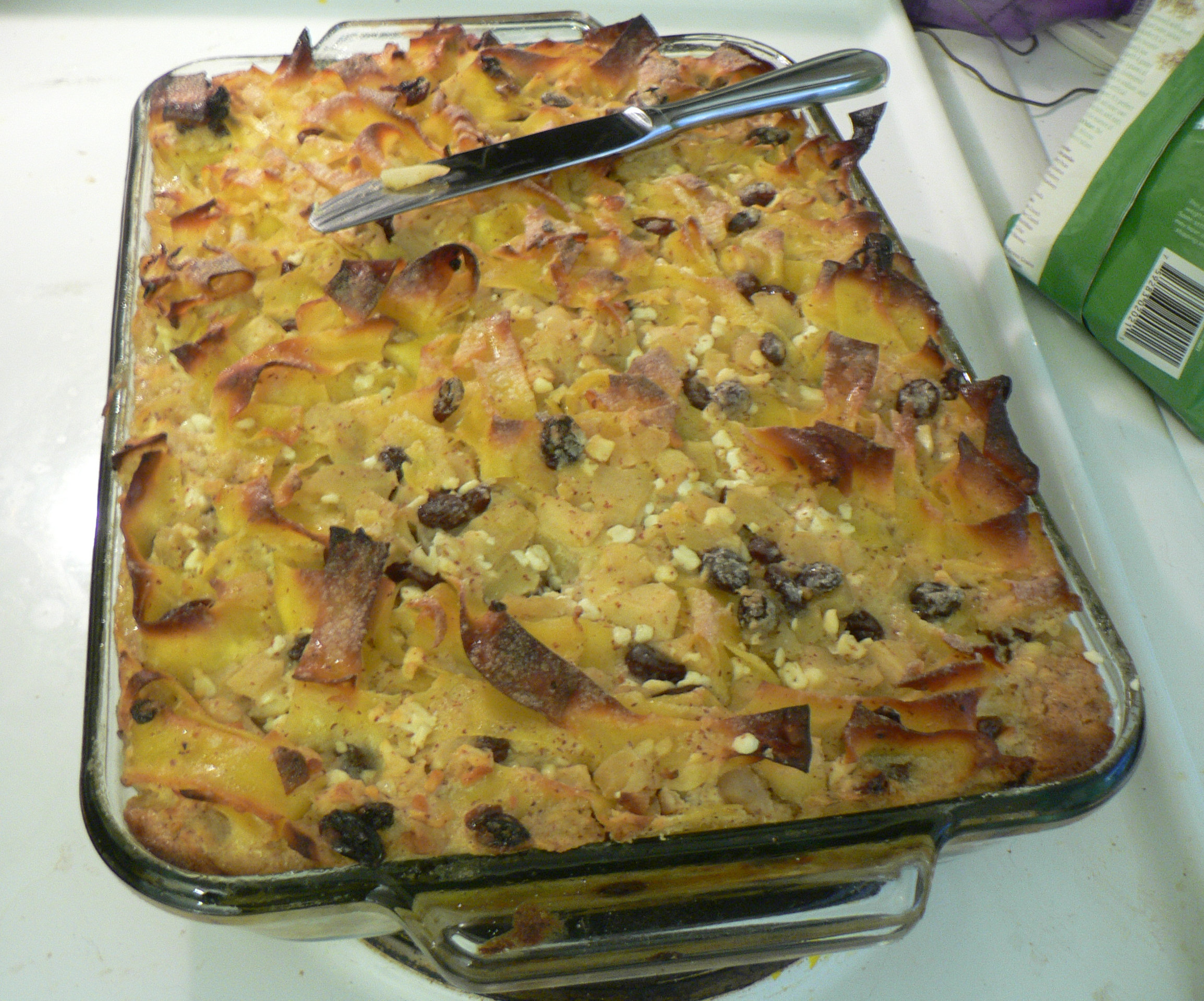
Lokshen kugel

The Jews were so widely scattered in the Middle Ages that it is difficult to give a connected account of their mode of living as to food. In Arabic countries the author of the Halakhot Gedolot knew some dishes that appear to have been specific Jewish foods, e.g., paspag, which was, perhaps, biscuit.

According to the Siddur Amram, the well-known "ḥaroset" is made in those countries from a mixture of herbs, flour and honey (Arabic,"ḥalikah").

Maimonides, in his "Sefer Refu'ot", mentions dishes that are good for health. He recommends bread baked from wheat that is not too new, nor too old, nor too fine, further, the meat of the kid, sheep and chicken and the yolks of eggs. Goats' and cows' milk is good, nor are cheese and butter harmful. Honey is good for old people; fish with solid white flesh meat is wholesome; so also are wine and dried fruits. Fresh fruits, however, are unwholesome, and he does not recommend garlic or onions.

There is detailed information about Italian Jewish cookery in the book Massechet Purim. It discusses pies, chestnuts, turtledoves, pancakes, small tarts, gingerbread, ragouts, venison, roast goose, chicken, stuffed pigeons, ducks, pheasants, partridges, quails, macaroons and salad. These were considered luxuries.

The oppressed medieval Jews enjoyed large meals only on Shabbat, festivals, circumcisions and weddings. For example, the Jews of Rhodes, according to a letter of Ovadiah Bartinura, 1488, lived on herbs and vegetables only, never tasting meat or wine. In Egypt, however, meat, fish and cheese were obtainable, in Gaza, grapes, fruit and wine. Cold dishes are still relished in the East. Generally, only one dish was eaten, with fresh bread daily.

Some Jewish dishes frequently mentioned in Yiddish literature from the 12th century onward are brätzel, lokshen, pasteten, fladen, beleg.

Barscht or borscht is a Ukrainian beet soup, best known are the berkes or barches (challah) eaten on Shabbat, and shalet (cholent), which Heine commemorates, and which the Spanish Jews called ani (hamin). Shabbat pudding, kigl or kugel in Yiddish, is also well known.

=== Modern era ===
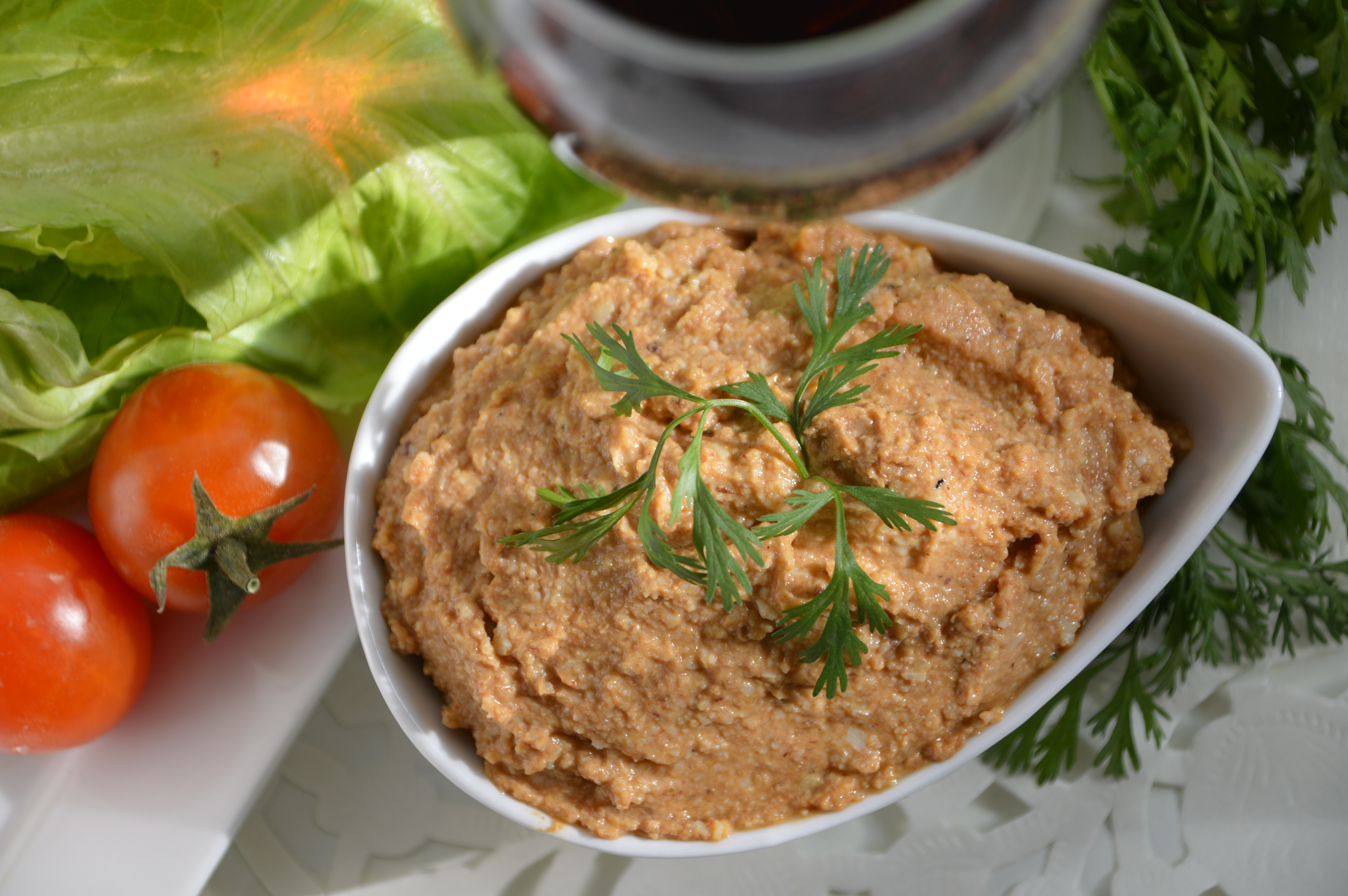
Chopped liver

In the United States, in particular, Jewish cooking (and the cookbooks that recorded and guided it) evolved in ways that illuminate changes in the role of Jewish women and the Jewish home.

Jewish cuisine has also played a big part in shaping the restaurant scene in the West, in particular in the UK and US. Israeli cuisine in particular has become a niche food trend in the UK, with Israeli restaurants now opening up sister restaurants in London and beyond.

In the 1930s there were four Jewish bakeries in Minneapolis within a few blocks of each other baking bagels and other fresh breads. Jewish families purchased challah loaves for their Sabbath meal at one North Side bakery. There were two kosher meat markets and four Jewish delicatessens, one of which began distribution for what would become Sara Lee frozen cheesecakes. The delis sold sandwiches like corned beef and salami.

== Jewish cuisine variations ==
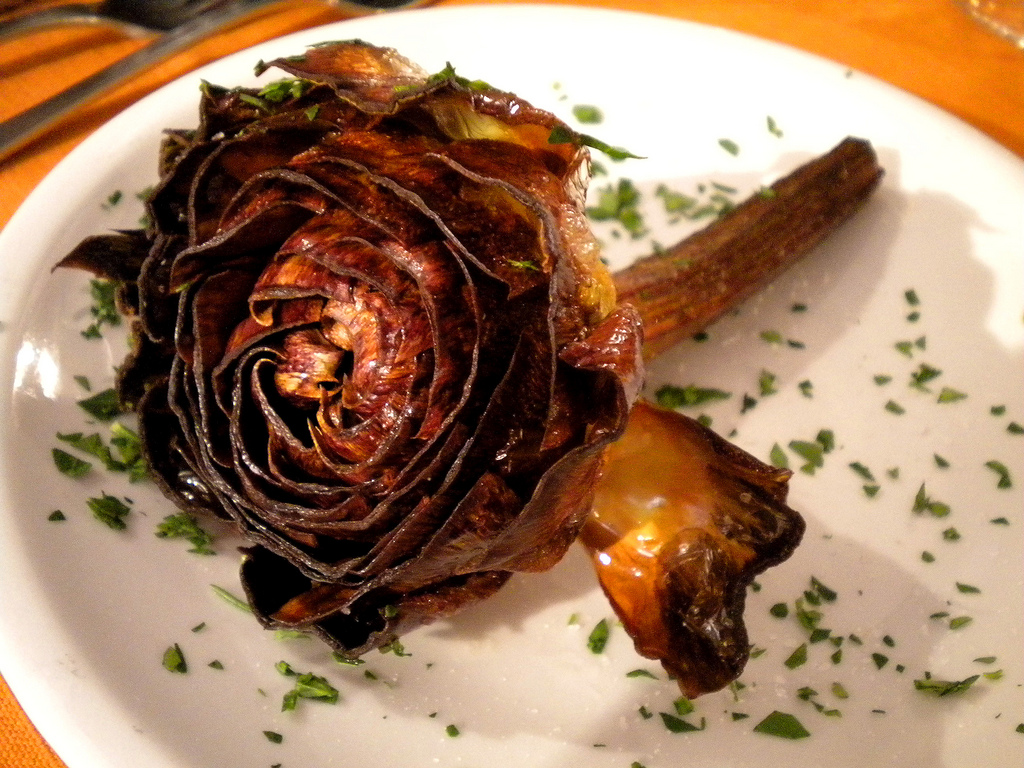
Fried Jewish artichokes

Jewish cuisines vary widely depending on their regions of origin, but they tend to be broadly categorized into Sephardic (Iberian, Anatolian, and North African), Mizrahi (Middle Eastern, Caucasian, and Central Asian) and Ashkenazi (Eastern, Western, and Central European) families.

Still, there is significant overlap between the different cuisines, as Jews have often migrated great distances and as different regions where Jews have settled (e.g. Southeastern Europe) have been influenced by different cultures over time. For example, Balkan Jewish cuisine contains both Ashkenazi/European and Sephardic-Turkish influences, as this part of Europe (up to the borders of present-day Austria, Czech Republic, and Poland) was for a time part of the Ottoman Empire.

Since the rise of Ashkenazi Jewish migration to 19th-century Palestine and the establishment of the State of Israel, increased contact between Ashkenazi, Sephardi and Mizrahi Jews has led to a rising importance of Middle-Eastern and Mediterranean cuisine amongst Jews of all backgrounds.

=== Ashkenazi ===
==== Fish ====
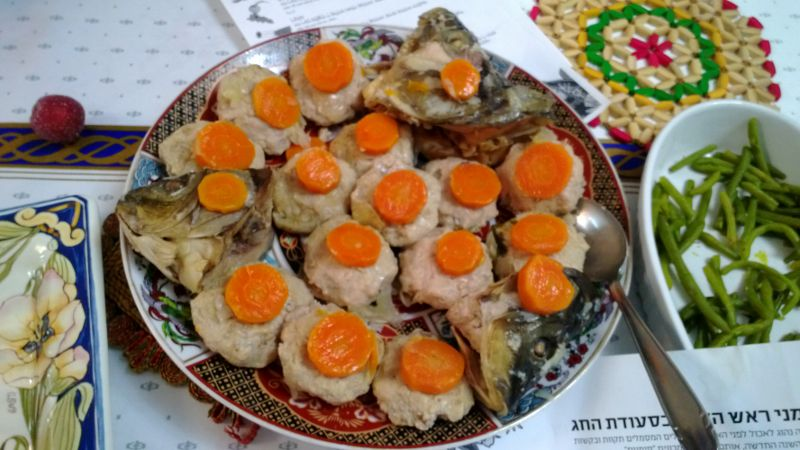
Gefilte fish with carrot and chrain (horseradish)

With kosher meat not always available, fish became an important staple of the Jewish diet. In Eastern Europe it was sometimes especially reserved for Shabbat. As fish is not considered meat by the culinary definition nor in the Judaic context, it is consumed by many observant Jews who consider to be permissible to eat fish with milk and other dairy products. However, within various Jewish communities there are different rules regarding fish and dairy. For instance, many Sephardim do not mix fish with milk or any other kind of dairy product. Similarly, the Chabad-Hasidic custom is not to consume fish together with specifically milk; however, it is permissible to eat fish and other dairy products (ex; butter, cheese, cream) at the same time.

Though the combination of dairy and fish is generally acceptable, fish is the only parve food that the Talmud places restrictions on when it is being baked/eaten alongside meat. Talmudic reasoning for not eating meat and fish together originates from health and sanitary concerns rather than holy obligations. Unlike with milk and meat, it is kosher to eat fish and meat at the same meal as long as they're baked separately, they're served on separate plates as separate courses, the same utensils aren't shared, and between courses the mouth is thoroughly cleansed with a beverage and the palate is neutralized with a different food.

Gefilte fish (from Yiddish געפֿילטע פֿיש gefilte fish, "stuffed fish") was traditionally made by skinning the fish steaks, usually German or French carp, de-boning the flesh, mincing it and sometimes mixing with finely chopped browned onions (3:1), eggs, salt or pepper and vegetable oil. The fish skin and head were then stuffed with the mixture and poached.

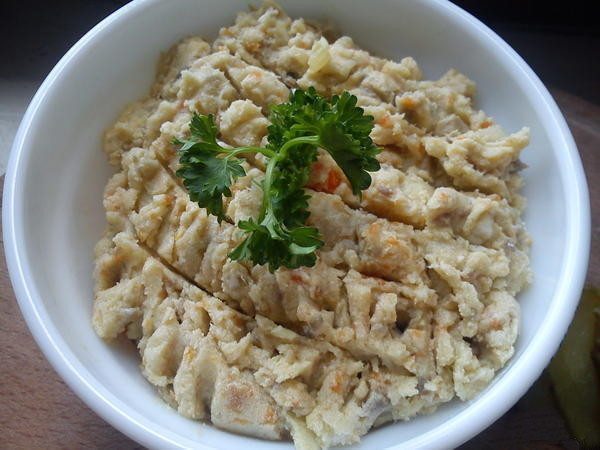
Vorschmack herring spread

A more common commercially packaged product found today is the "Polish" gefilte fish patties or balls, similar to quenelles, where sugar is added to the broth, resulting in a slightly sweet taste. Strictly speaking they are the fish filling, rather than the complete filled fish. This method of serving evolved from the tradition of removing the stuffing from the skin.

==== Bread and cake ====
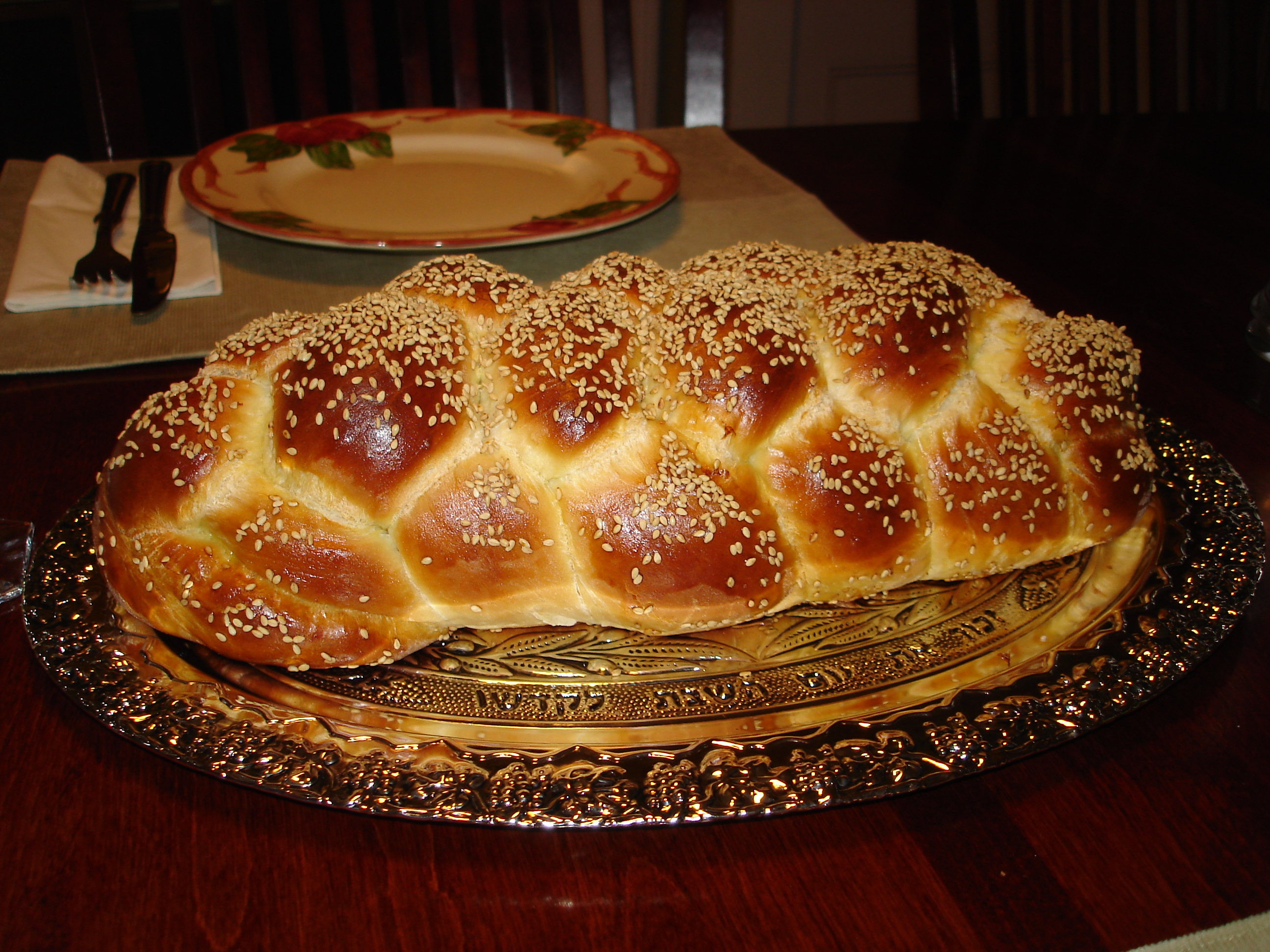
Challah bread

The dough of challah (called barkhes in Western Yiddish) is often shaped into forms having symbolical meanings; thus on Rosh Hashanah rings and coins are imitated, indicating "May the new year be as round and complete as these"; for Hosha'na Rabbah, bread is baked in the form of a key, meaning "May the door of heaven open to admit our prayers." Challah bread is most commonly braided or made in round roll shapes.

The hamentash, a triangular cookie or turnover filled with fruit preserves (lekvar) or honey and black poppy seed paste, is eaten on the Feast of Purim. It is said to be shaped like the ears of Haman the tyrant. The mohn kihel is a circular or rectangular wafer sprinkled with poppy seed. Pirushkes, or turnovers, are little cakes fried in honey or dipped in molasses after they are baked. Strudel is served for dessert. Kugels are prepared from rice, noodles or mashed potatoes.

In Eastern Europe, the Jews baked black (proster, or "ordinary") bread, white bread and challah. The most common form is the twist (koilitch or kidke from the Romanian word încolăci which means "to twist"). The koilitch is oval in form and about one and a half feet in length. On special occasions, such as weddings, the koilitch is increased to a length of about two and a half feet.

The bagel, which originated in Poland, is a popular Ashkenazi food and became widespread in the United States.

==== Meat and fats ====
Gebratenes (roasted meat), chopped meat and essig-fleisch (vinegar meat) are favorite meat recipes. The essig or, as it is sometimes called, honig or sauerbraten, is made by adding to meat which has been partially roasted with some sugar, bay leaves, pepper, raisins, salt and a little vinegar. Knish is a snack food consisting of a meat or potato filling covered with dough that is either baked or grilled.

A popular dish among Ashkenazim, as amongst most Eastern-Europeans, is pierogi (which are related to but distinct from kreplach), often filled with minced beef. Kishka is a popular Ashkenazi dish traditionally made of stuffing of flour or matza meal, schmaltz and spices.

The rendered fat of chickens, known as schmaltz, is sometimes kept in readiness for cooking use when needed. Gribenes or "scraps", also called griven, the cracklings left from the rendering process were one of the favorite foods in Eastern Europe. Schmaltz is eaten spread on bread.

A spread of chopped liver, prepared with onions and often including gribenes, is a popular appetizer, side dish, or snack, especially among Jews on the eastern coast of North America. It is usually served with rye bread or crackers. Brisket is also a popular Ashkenazi dish of braised beef brisket.

Holishkes, stuffed cabbage, also known as the cabbage roll, is also a European Jewish dish that emerged from more impoverished times for Jews. Because having a live cow was more valuable than to eat meat in the Middle Ages, Jews used fillers such as breadcrumbs and vegetables to mix with ground beef. This gave the effect of more meat being stuffed into the cabbage leaves.

==== Sweets and confections ====
Because it was easy to prepare, made from inexpensive ingredients and contained no dairy products, compote became a staple dessert in Jewish households throughout Europe and was considered part of Jewish cuisine.

==== Side dishes ====
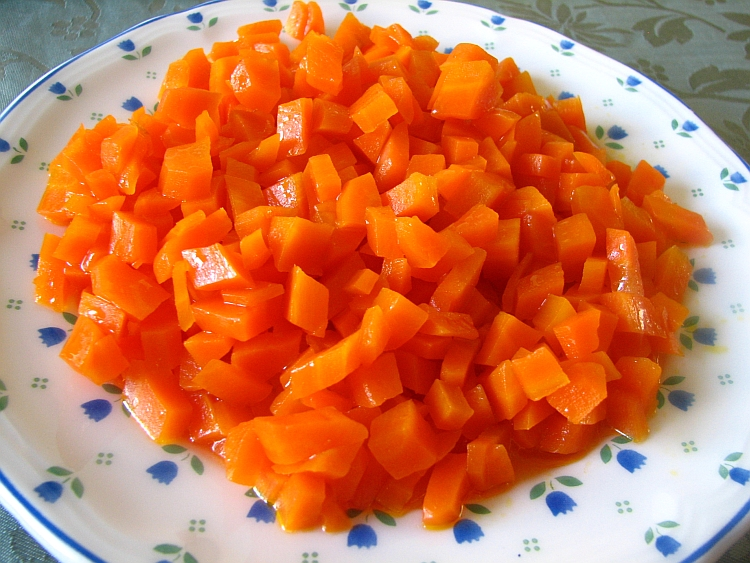
Carrot tzimmes

Tzimmes consists generally of cooked vegetables or fruits, sometimes with meat added. The most popular vegetable is the carrot (mehren tzimmes), which is sliced. Turnips were also used for tzimmes, particularly in Lithuania. In southern Russia, Galicia and Romania tzimmes was made of pears, apples, figs, prunes or plums (floymn tzimmes).

Kreplach, similar to Russian pelmeni, are ravioli-like dumplings made from flour and eggs mixed into a dough, rolled into sheets, cut into squares and then filled with finely chopped, seasoned meat or cheese. They are most often served in soup, but may be fried. Kreplech are eaten on various holidays, among them Purim and Hosha'na Rabbah.

=== Sephardic, and Mizrahi Jewish cuisine ===
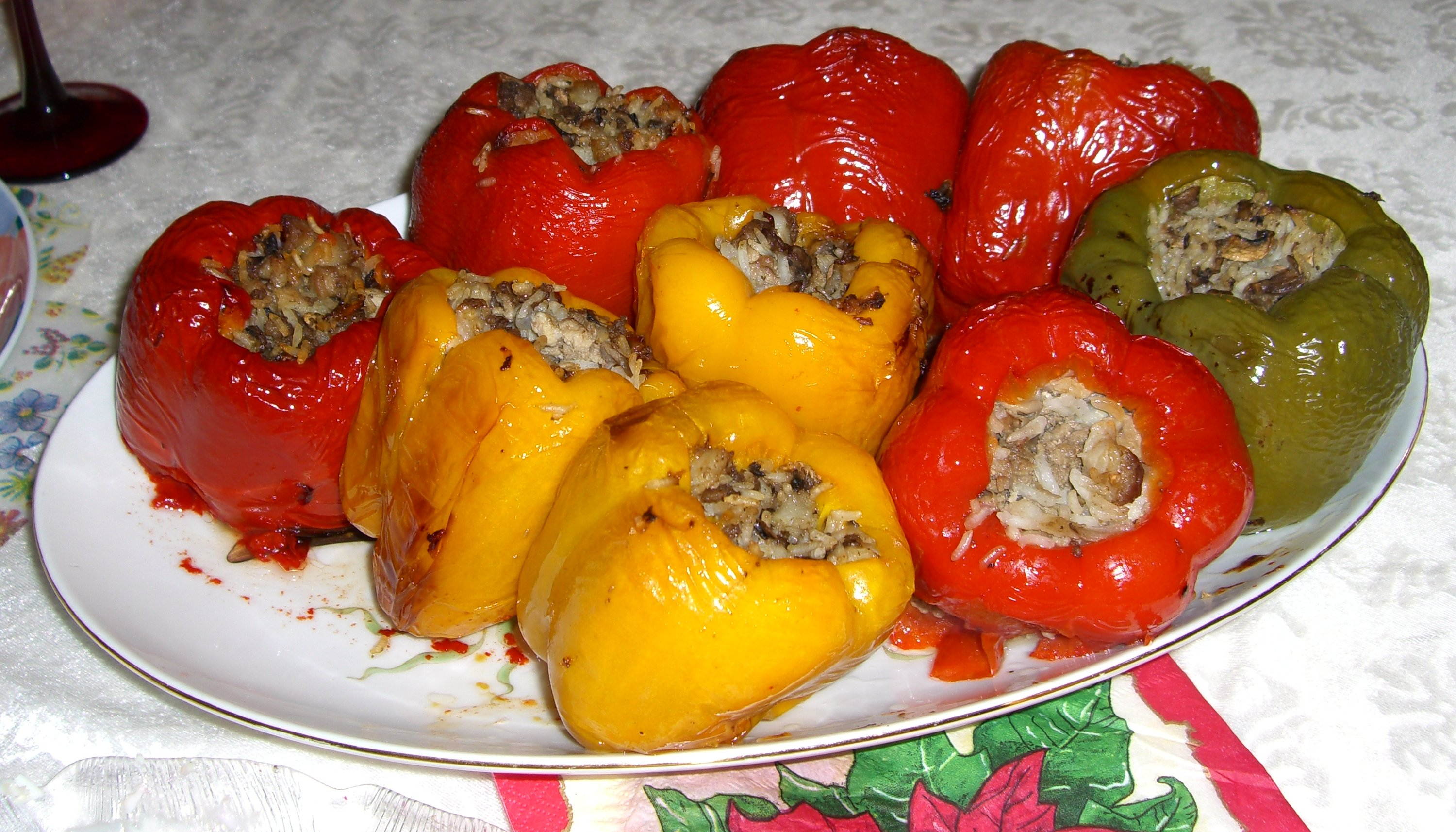
Stuffed peppers

The exact distinction between traditional Sephardic and Mizrahi cuisines can be difficult to make, due to the intermingling of the Sephardi diaspora and the Mizrahi Jews with whom they came in contact. As a general rule, however, both types reflect the food of the local non-Jewish population that each group lived amongst. The need to preserve kashrut does lead to a few significant changes (most notably, the use of olive oil instead of animal fat is often considered to be a legacy of Jewish residency in an area, due to the fact that olive oil may be eaten with milk, unlike animal fat). Despite this, Sephardic and Ashkenazic concepts of kosher differ; perhaps the most notable difference being that rice, a major staple of the Sephardic diet, is considered kosher for Passover among Sephardim but it is forbidden as kitniyot by most Ashkenazim. Sephardi cuisine emphasizes salads, stuffed vegetables and vine leaves, olive oil, lentils, fresh and dried fruits, herbs and nuts, and chickpeas. Meat dishes often make use of lamb or ground beef. Fresh lemon juice is added to many soups and sauces. Many meat and rice dishes incorporate dried fruits such as apricots, prunes and raisins. Pine nuts are used as a garnish. Mizrahi cuisine is based largely on fresh ingredients, as marketing was done in the local souq. Meat is ritually slaughtered in the shechita process, and is soaked and salted. Meat dishes are a prominent feature of Shabbat, festival, and celebratory meals. Cooked, stuffed and baked vegetables are central to the cuisine, as are various kinds of beans, chickpeas, lentils and burghul (cracked wheat). Rice takes the place of potatoes. Coming from the Mediterranean and "sunny" climes, Mizrahi cuisine is often light, with an emphasis on salads, stuffed vegetables and vine leaves, olive oil, lentils, fresh and dried fruits, herbs and nuts, and chickpeas. Meat dishes often make use of lamb or ground beef. Fresh lemon juice is added to many soups and sauces.

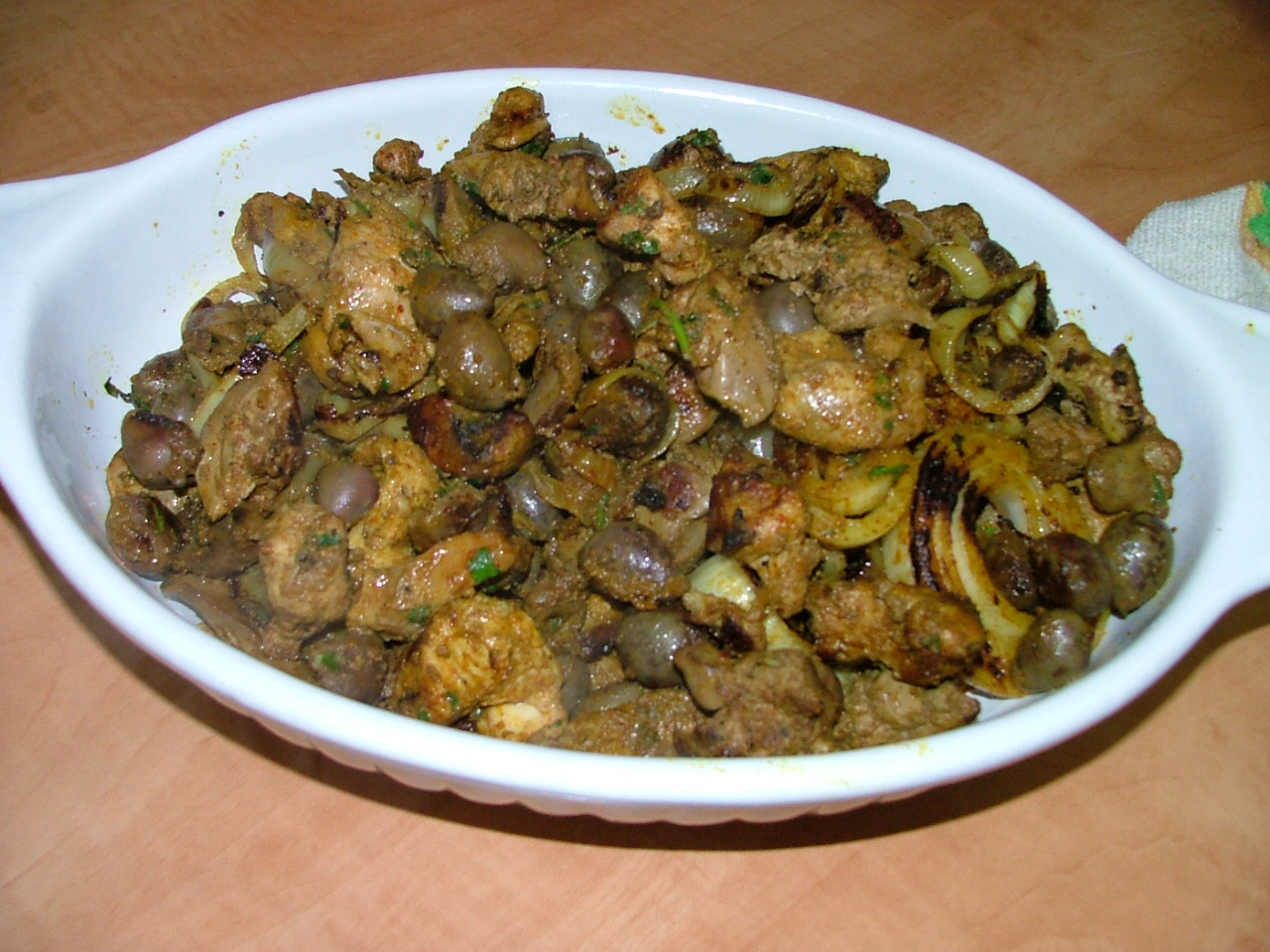
Jerusalem mixed grill

Many meat and rice dishes incorporate dried fruits such as apricots, prunes and raisins. Pine nuts are used as a garnish. Pomegranate juice is a staple of Persian Jewish cooking. Kubbeh, a meat-stuffed bulgur dumpling, features in the cooking of many Mizrahi communities. It is served in the cooking broth, as a kind of soup.

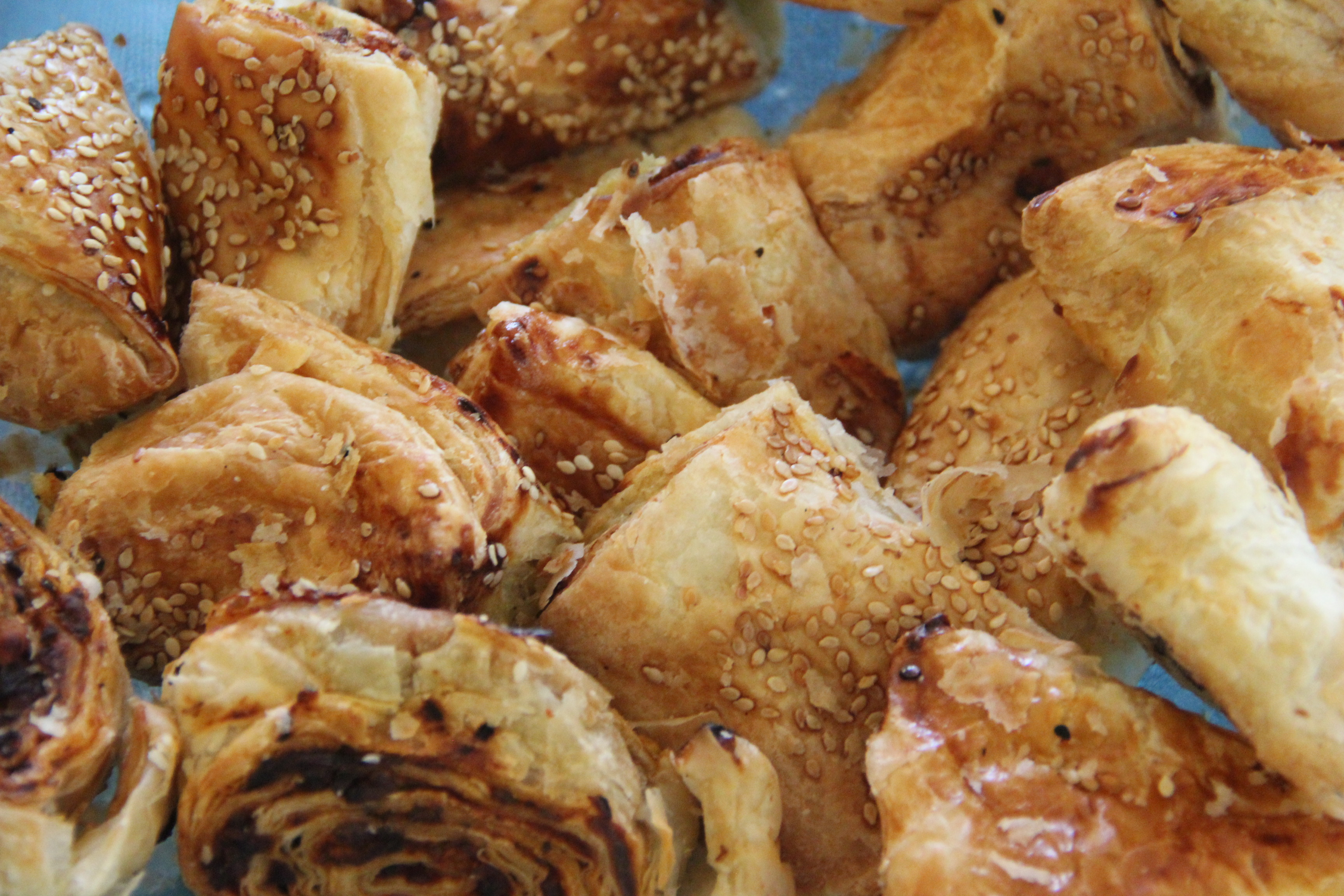
bourekas

Sephardic cuisine in particular is known for its considerable use of vegetables unavailable to the Ashkenazim of Europe, including spinach, artichokes, pine nuts and (in more modern times) squash.

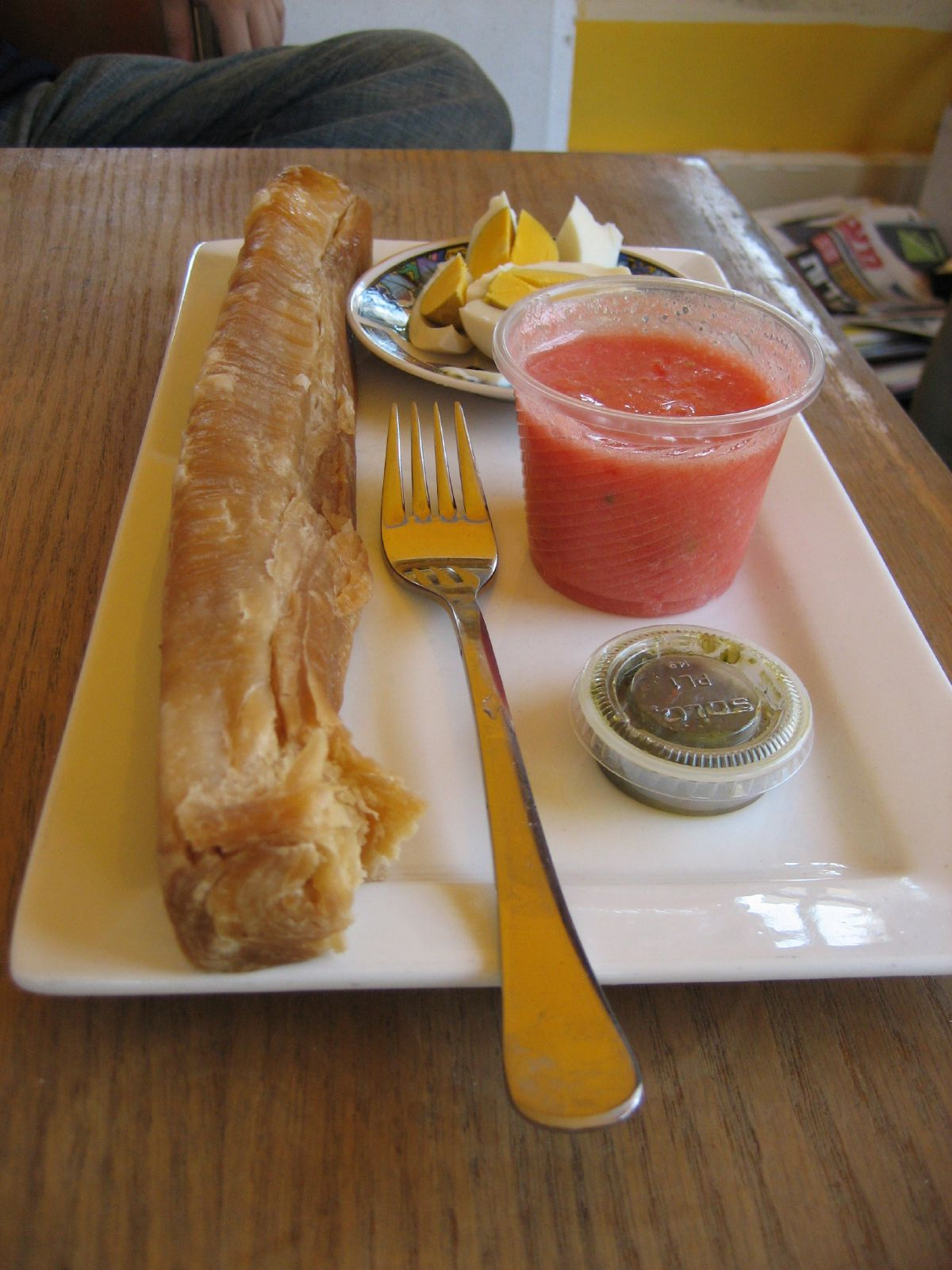
Jachnun

The cooking style is largely Middle Eastern, with significant admixtures of Spanish, Italian and North African flavors. The most popular Sephardic and Mizrahi dishes include malawach, jachnun, sabich, mofletta, meorav yerushalmi, and kubaneh. Popular condiments include skhug and amba. Mizrahi Jewish cuisine has many unique dishes that were eaten by Jews in Iraq, Eastern Turkey, Iran and Yemen.

== Shabbat and holiday dishes ==
=== Shabbat ===
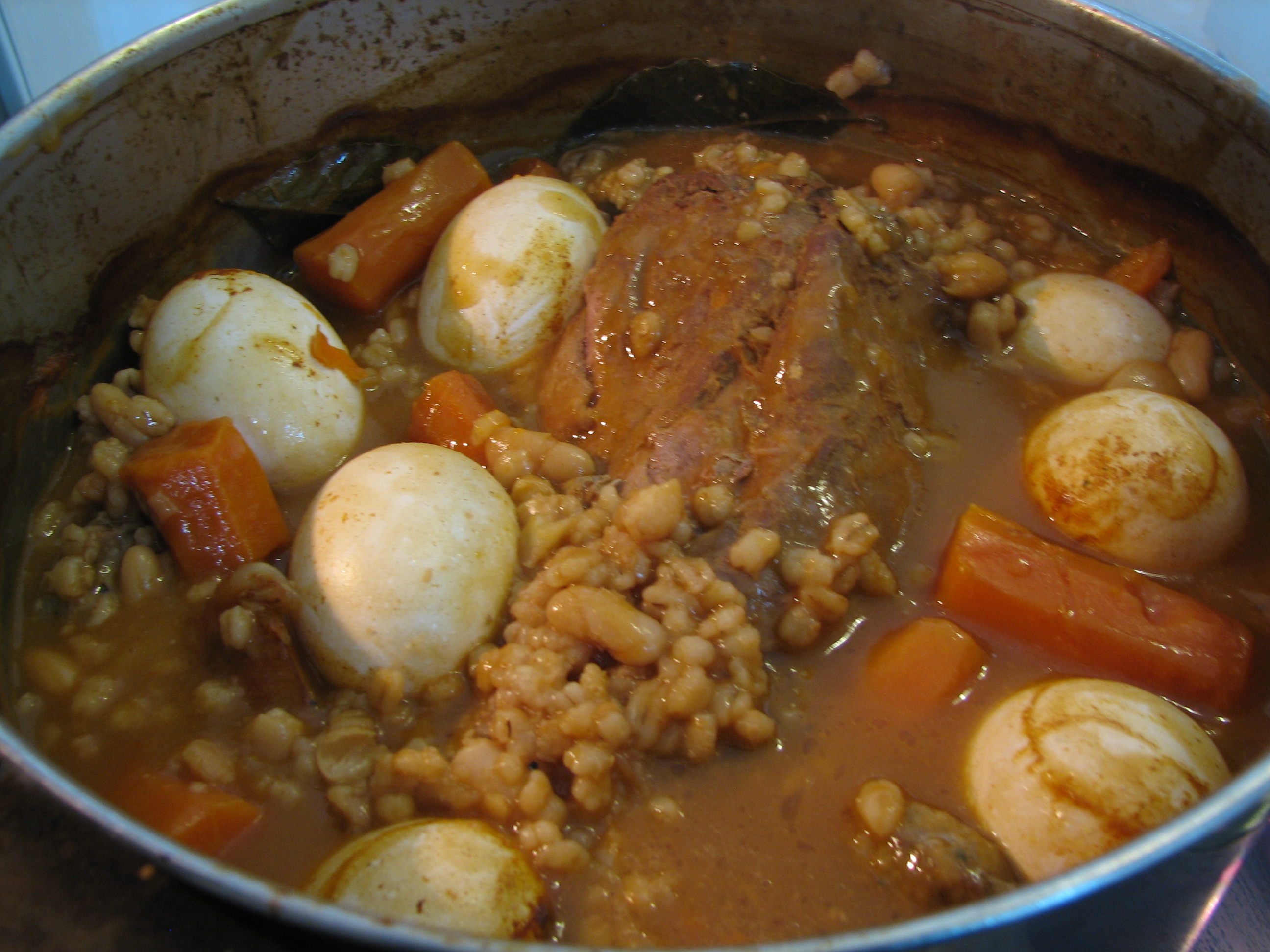
Chamin

Good food is an important part of the mitzvah of oneg Shabbat ("enjoying Shabbat"), hence much of Jewish cuisine revolves around Shabbat.

Traditionally observant Jews do not cook on Shabbat, so a hot meal can be provided by cholent or chamin, a slow-cooked meat stew with many variations. The ingredients are placed in a pot and put up to boil before lighting the candles on Friday evening. Then the pot is placed on a hotplate, traditional blech (thin tin sheet used to cover the flames and on which the pot is placed), or in a slow oven and left to simmer until the following day.

=== Rosh Hashanah ===
On Rosh Hashanah, the Jewish New Year, several symbolic foods called simanim are prepared and eaten for a variety of different reasons, each unique to the dish. All of the ingredients within the dishes are kosher, which means they follow the laws of kashrut, the Hebrew word for correct.

The majority of the dishes are sweetened to represent a prayer for a sweet (pleasant) new year. Such sweet dishes include apples that are either baked or covered in honey, lekach (honey cake) and makroudh (a pastry that is filled with dates and covered with honey).

Dates, symbolizing the end, can also be eaten by themselves to encourage the enemies to meet their end. The value of the date can be traced back to biblical times, when the palm date is mentioned multiple times within the Bible itself, but also with how valuable dates were as an export.

Pomegranate seeds are eaten for a year of many blessings, because there are many seeds inside of a single pomegranate. Specifically, there are thought to be 613 seeds inside of a pomegranate, each one representing one of the Torah's 613 commandments.

The traditional value placed on pomegranates and their consumption is derived from their mention in the Bible when its discovery by one of Moses's spies concluded that there was fertility in the land of the unknown.

Challah bread is baked into a round, circular shape that is meant to represent the cyclical nature of life and the crown. It is also sweetened with either honey or a combination of cinnamon and sugar instead of being dipped into the usual kosher salt.

Tzimmes, a side dish composed traditionally of sweetened carrots or yams, are served to symbolize prosperity, because of the double meaning of Yiddish word meren, which represents "to multiply" and "carrot".

Additional symbolic foods include:

- Teiglach, knotted pastries boiled in a honeyed syrup (for Ashkenazi Jews).
- Head of a fish or a ram, for a successful year in which we are the "head", not the "tail" (because Rosh Hashanah begins the year, it is referred to as the head).
- Fried leek cutlets, called karteh (for Sephardic Jews).
- Fried chard cutlets, called salkeh (for Sephardic Jews).
- Local type of zucchini called qara'a, made into sweet confiture (for Sephardic Jews).
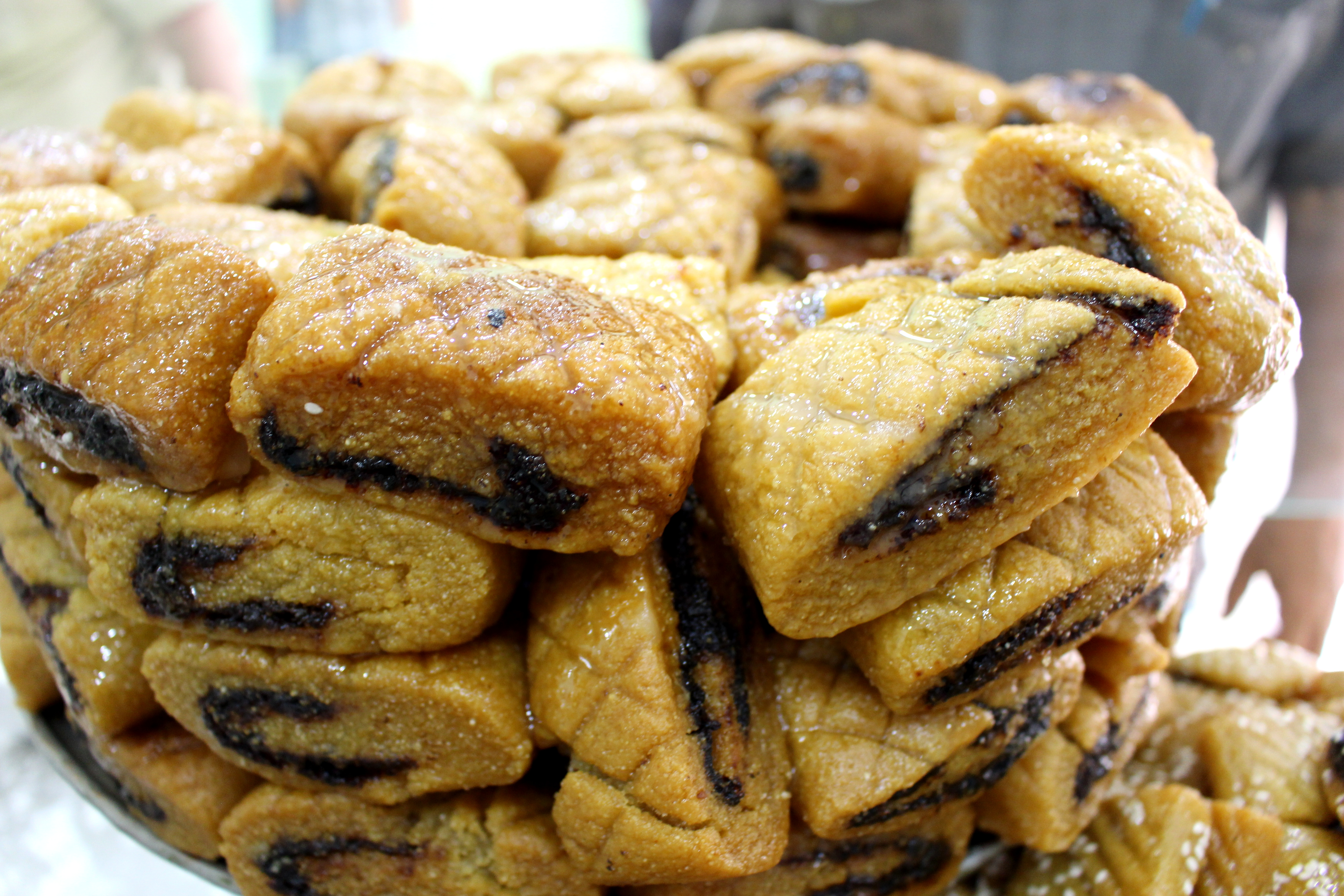
  Makroudh
- Algerian Jews serve a honey-dipped date pastry called makroudh.

=== Yom Kippur ===
Yom Kippur is a fast day.

=== Sukkot ===
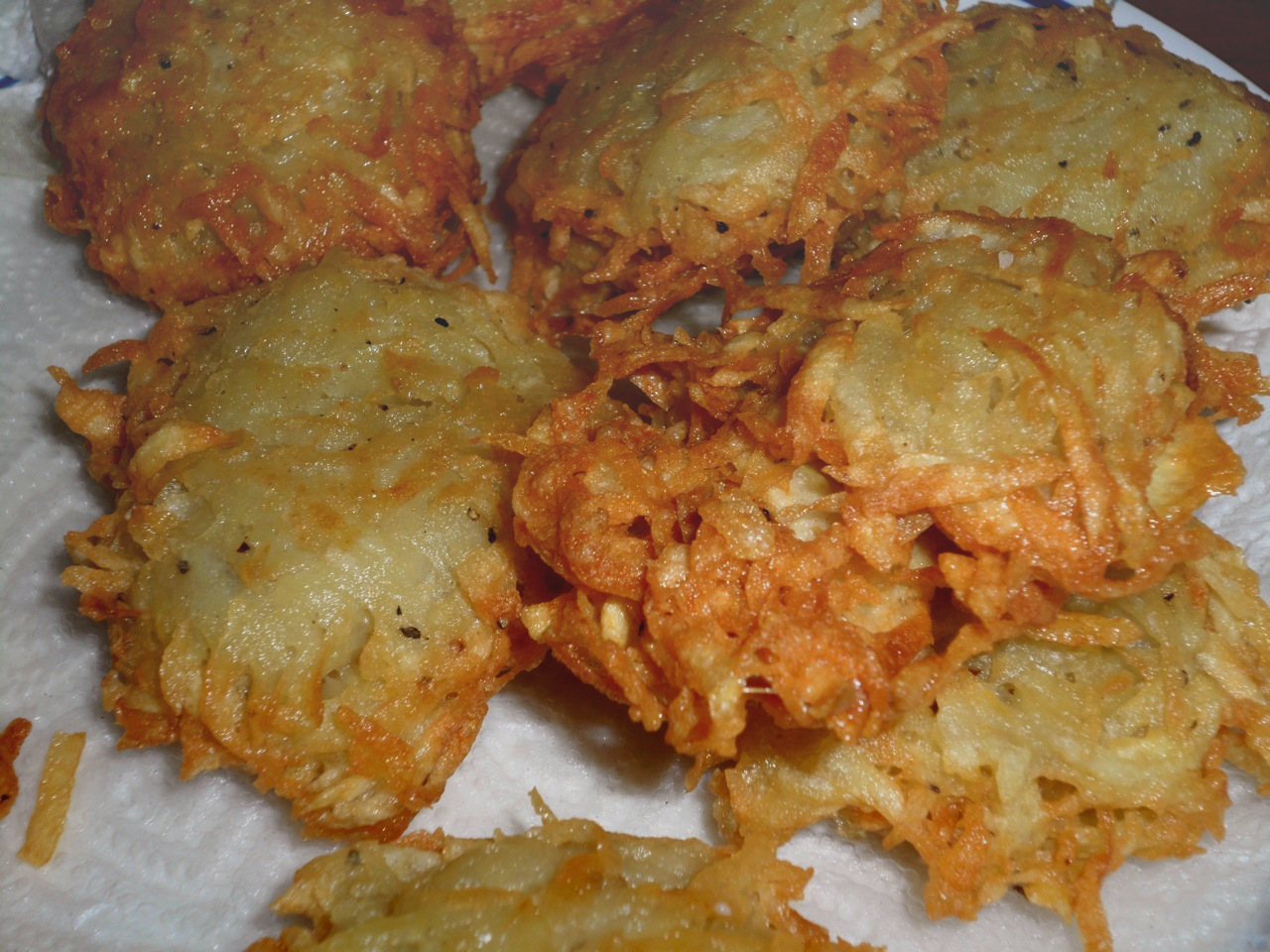
Latkes with smetana

On Sukkot meals are eaten outside in the sukkah, a thatched hut built specially for the holiday. Often fresh fruits are eaten also, which are woven into the roof of the thatched hut.

=== Hanukkah ===
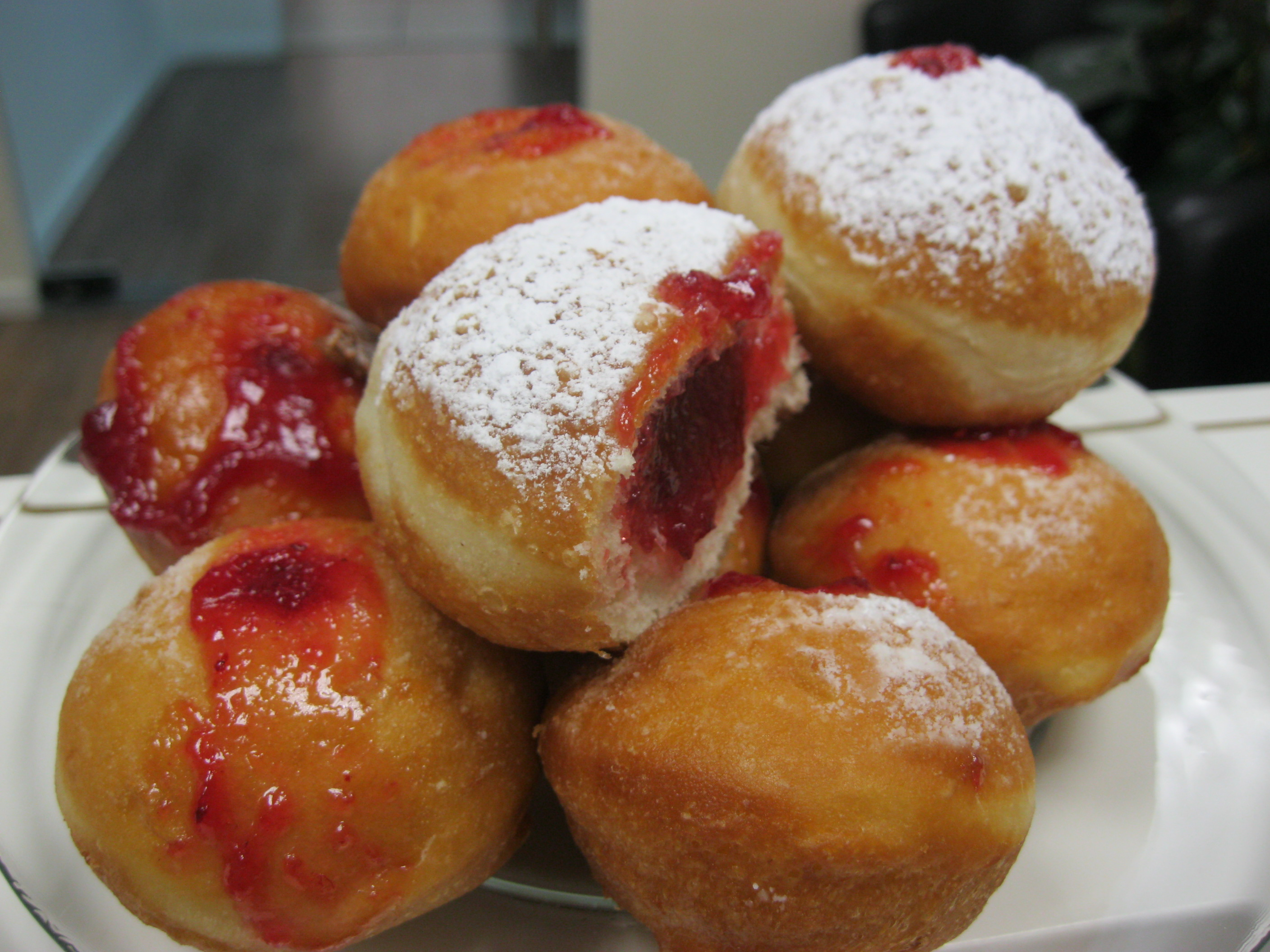
Sufganiyot

It is customary to eat foods fried in oil to celebrate Hanukkah. Eating dairy products was a custom in medieval times.

- Latkes—potato pancakes, may be topped with sour cream or applesauce (Ashkenazi food)
- Sufganiyot—jam doughnuts (Ashkenazi, popular in Israel)
- Fried doughnuts with grounded sugar sprinkled on top, called sfinge (mainly by North African Jews) or zalabiyeh.
- Rugelach—filled pastry.

=== Purim ===
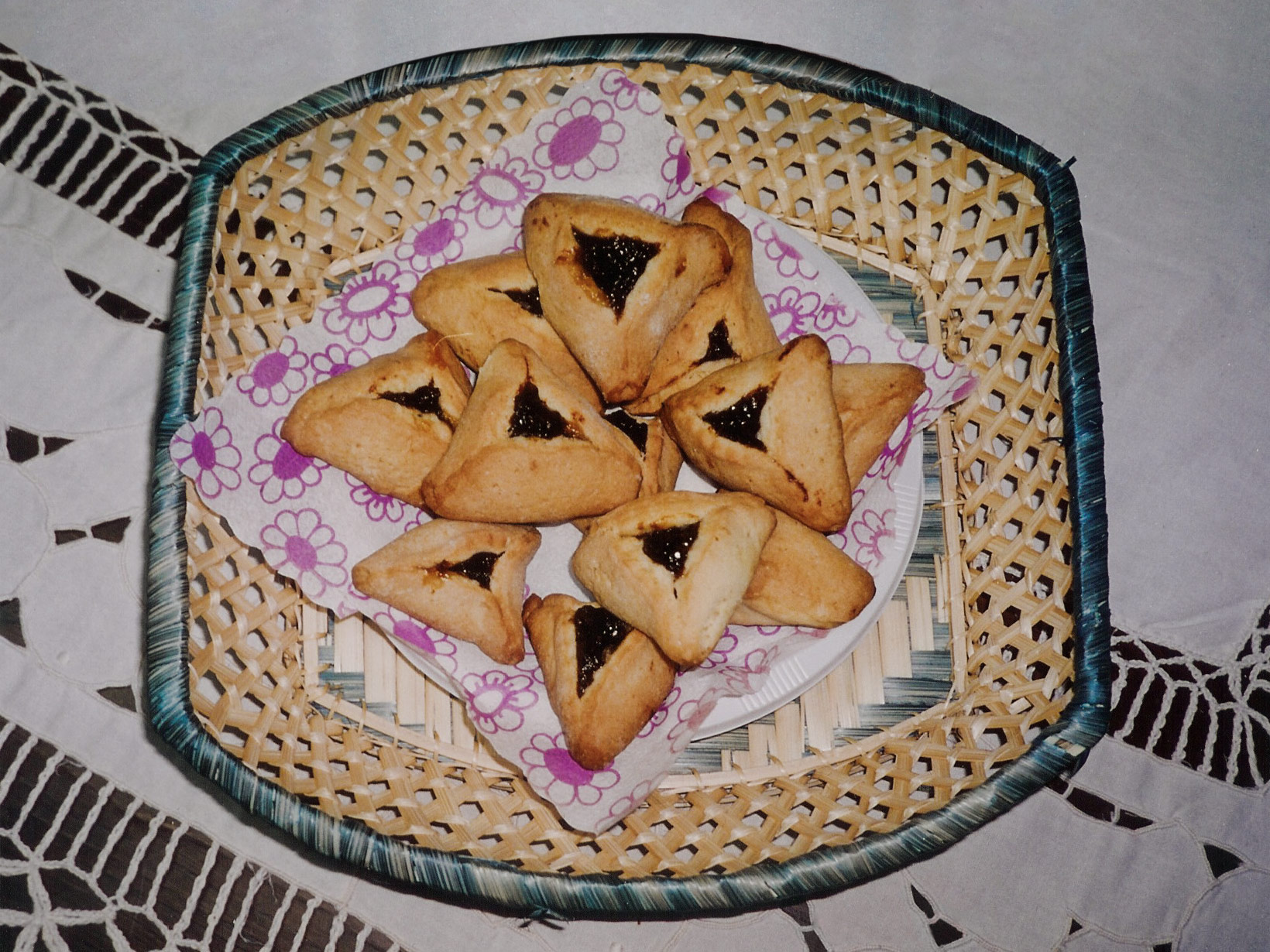
hamantaschen

- Hamantaschen—triangular pastries traditionally filled with poppy seeds or prunes
- Couscous—a Berber dish of small steamed balls of crushed durum wheat semolina traditionally served with a stew spooned on top • Fazuelos—Sephardic pastries of thin fried dough
- Ma'amoul—shortbread pastries filled with dates or nuts

=== Passover ===
Passover celebrates The Exodus from Egypt where it is said the Jewish people left so quickly, there was no time for their bread to rise. Commemorating this event, Jews eat matza and abstain from bread, cakes and other foods made with yeast and leavening agents. In modern times, rabbinical authorities permit the use of chemical leavening, such as baking powder.

Matza is a staple food during the holiday and used as an ingredient of many Passover dishes. Kneidlach (matza ball) soup is traditional. Fish is coated with matza meal before frying and cakes and puddings are made with potato starch and matza meal.

Jewish cooks use both matza meal and potato starch for pastries during Passover. Whisked whole eggs or egg whites are frequently used to make pastries without leavening agents, such as angel and sponge cakes (potato starch replacing cake flour) and coconut and almond macaroons.

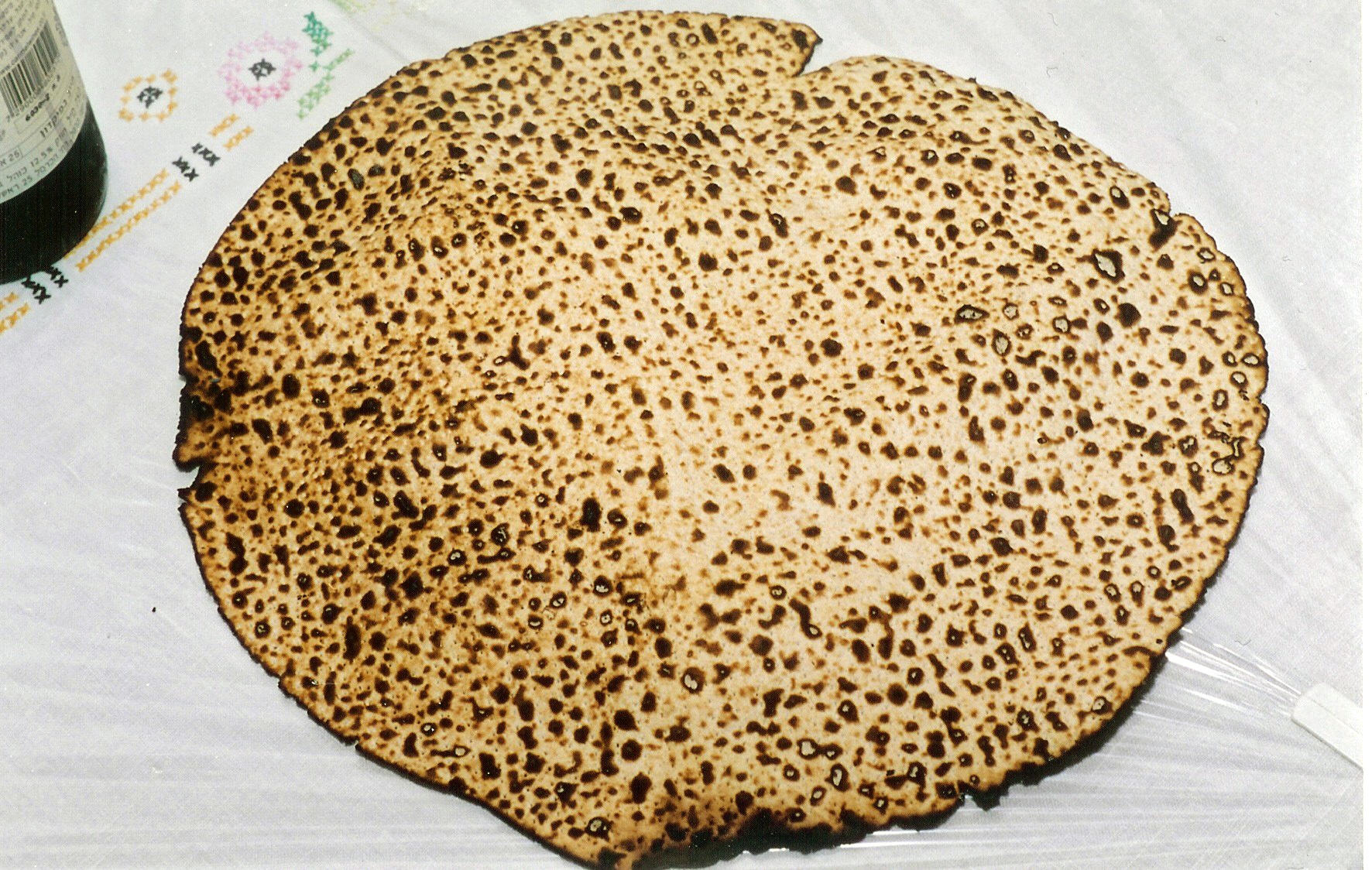
Handmade matsa shmura

Passover foods vary distinctly between Sephardic and Ashkenazic communities. Ashkenazim exclude rice, while it is served by Sephardim. Matza is traditionally prepared from water and flour only, but there are other varieties, such as egg matza, which may also contain fruit juice.

At the seder, it is customary in some communities, particularly among strictly Orthodox Jews, to use handmade shmura matza, which has undergone particularly strict kashrut supervision.

The exclusion of leaven from the home has forced Jewish cooks to be creative, producing a wide variety of Passover dishes that use matza meal and potato as thickeners. Potato flour is largely used in cakes along with finely ground matza meal and nuts.

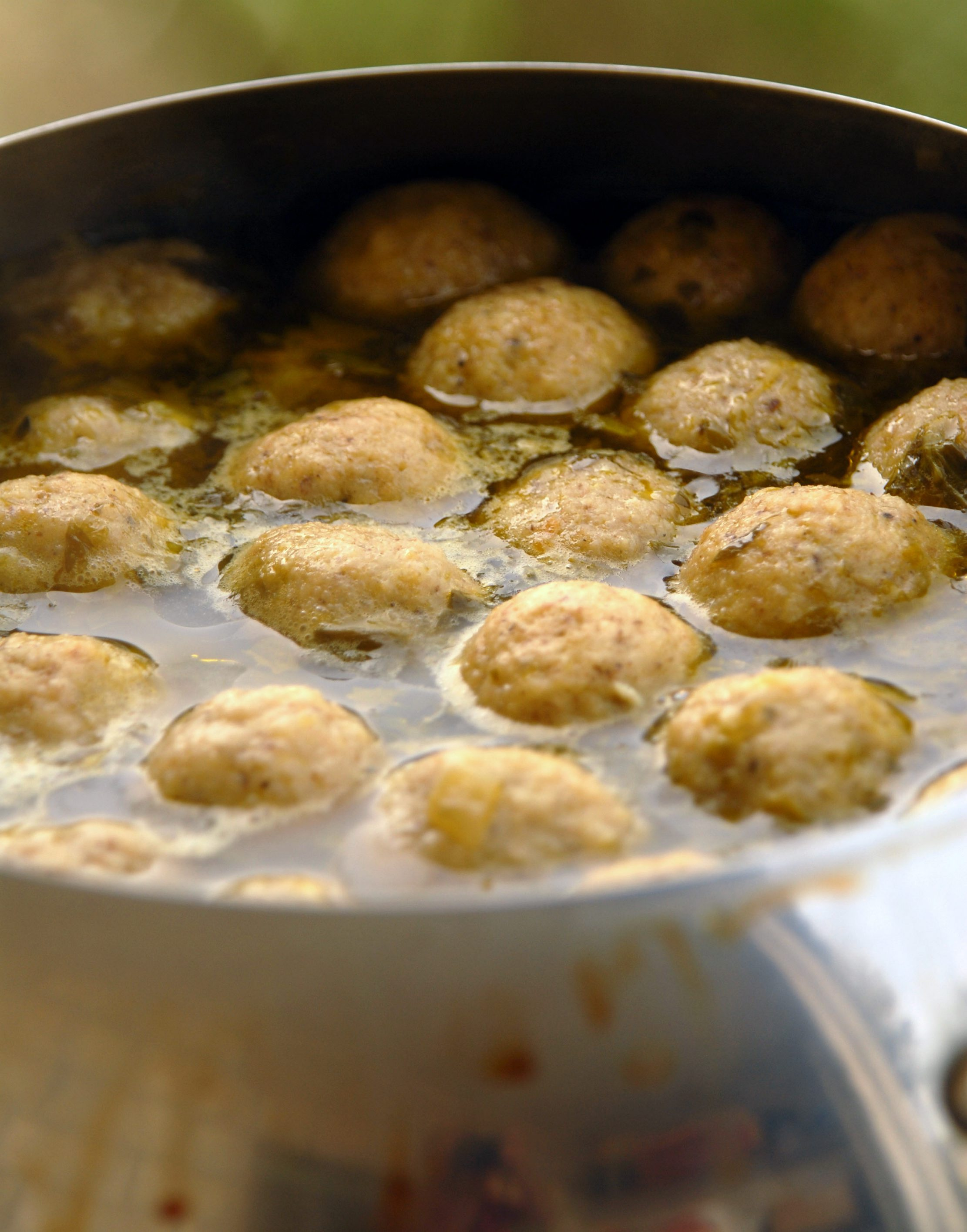
Soup with matza balls

Popular Ashkenazi dishes are matza brei (crumbled matza with grated onion, fried with scrambled egg), matza latkes (pancakes) and chremslach (also called crimsel or gresjelies, matza meal fritters). Wined matza kugels (pudding) have been introduced into modern Jewish cooking.

For thickening soups and sauces at Passover fine matza meal or potato flour is used instead of flour, for frying fish or cutlets a coating of matza meal and egg, and for stuffing potatoes instead of soaked bread.

"Noodles" may be made by making pancakes with beaten eggs and matza meal which, when cooked, are rolled up and cut into strips. They may be dropped into soup before serving. Matza kleys (dumplings) are small balls made from suet mixed with chopped fried onions, chopped parsley, beaten egg and seasonings, dropped into soup and cooked.

Wine is also an important part of Passover meals. Traditionally, a Passover seder is served with four cups of wine or grape juice, to be consumed along with various parts of the seder. Kosher wine is typically consumed for Passover.

=== Shavuot ===
Dairy foods are traditionally eaten on Shavuot.

- Blintzes
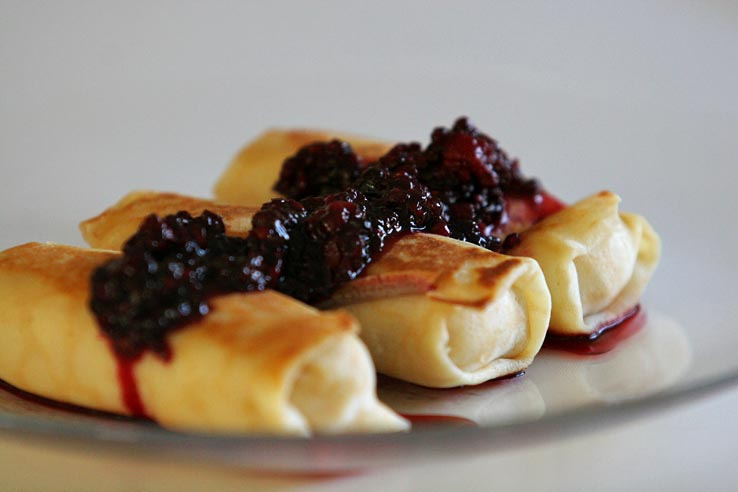
  Blintz
- Cheesecake

=== Tisha B'Av ===
Tisha B'av is a fast day, preceded by nine days when Jews traditionally do not eat meat, except on Shabbat.

The meal before the fast (the seudat mafseket) also consists of dairy foods and usually contains dishes made from lentils and eggs, both ancient Jewish symbols of mourning.

== See also ==
- American Jewish cuisine
- Appetizing store
- Cuisine of Israel
- Cuisine of the Ashkenazi Jews
- Cuisine of the Sephardic Jews
- Cuisine of the Mizrahi Jews
- Jewish deli
- Hechsher
- Jewish vegetarianism
- Kosher restaurant
- Kosher wine
- List of Jewish cuisine dishes
- List of kosher restaurants

== Bibliography ==
- Bellin, Mildred Grosberg, The Original Jewish Cook Book, New York, Bloch Publishing, 1983, ISBN 0-8197-0058-4
- Cooper, John, Eat and Be Satisfied: A Social History of Jewish Food, New Jersey, Jason Aronson Inc., 1993, ISBN 0-87668-316-2
- Goldstein, Joyce and Da Costa, Beatriz, Sephardic Flavors: Jewish Cooking of the Mediterranean, Chronicle Books, 2000, ISBN 0-8118-2662-7
- Feinberg Vamosh, Miriam (2007). Food at the Time of the Bible: From Adam's Apple to the Last Supper. Israel: Palphot. ISBN 978-965-280-115-9.
- Hareuveni, Nogah (1980). Nature in Our Biblical Heritage. Israel: Neot Kedumim. ISBN 965-233-002-7.
- Gur, Jana (2008). The Book of New Israeli Food: A Culinary Journey. New York: Schocken. ISBN 978-0-8052-1224-2.
- Kraemer, David (2007). Jewish eating and identity throughout the ages. New York: Routledge advances in sociology vol.29. ISBN 978-0-415-95797-7.
- Marks, Gil (2010). Encyclopedia of Jewish Food. New Jersey: John Wiley & Sons, Inc. ISBN 978-0-470-39130-3.
- Marks, Gil, The World of Jewish Cooking: More than 500 Traditional Recipes from Alsace to Yemen, New York, Simon & Schuster, 1996, ISBN 0-684-83559-2
- Macdonald, Nathan (2008). What Did the Ancient Israelites Eat? Diet in Biblical Times. W. B. Eerdmans Publishing Company. ISBN 978-0-8028-6298-3.
- Roden, Claudia, The Book of Jewish Food: An Odyssey from Samarkand to New York, New York, Knopf, 1997, ISBN 0-394-53258-9
- Schwartz, Oded, In Search of Plenty: A History of Jewish Food, London, Kyle Cathie Ltd., 1992, ISBN 1-85626-025-9
- Sternberg, Robert, The Sephardic Kitchen: The Healthful Food and Rich Culture of the Mediterranean Jews, HarperCollins, 1996, ISBN 0-06-017691-1

=== Historical ===
- Atrutel, J., Book of Jewish Cookery, London, 1874
- Greenbaum, Florence Kreisler, The International Jewish Cookbook, New York, Bloch Publishing, 1919
- Kander, Mrs. Simon (Lizzie Black Kander), The Settlement Cookbook, Milwaukee, The Settlement, 1901
- Kramer, Bertha M. ("Aunt Babette"), Aunt Babette's Cook Book Cincinnati, Bloch Publishing, 1889
- Montefiore, Lady Judith (attr), The Jewish Manual, London, 1846
- Aunt Sarah's Cookery Book for a Jewish Kitchen, Liverpool, 1872; 2d ed., 1889
