= Poppy seed paste =

Sweet ingredient in European cuisine

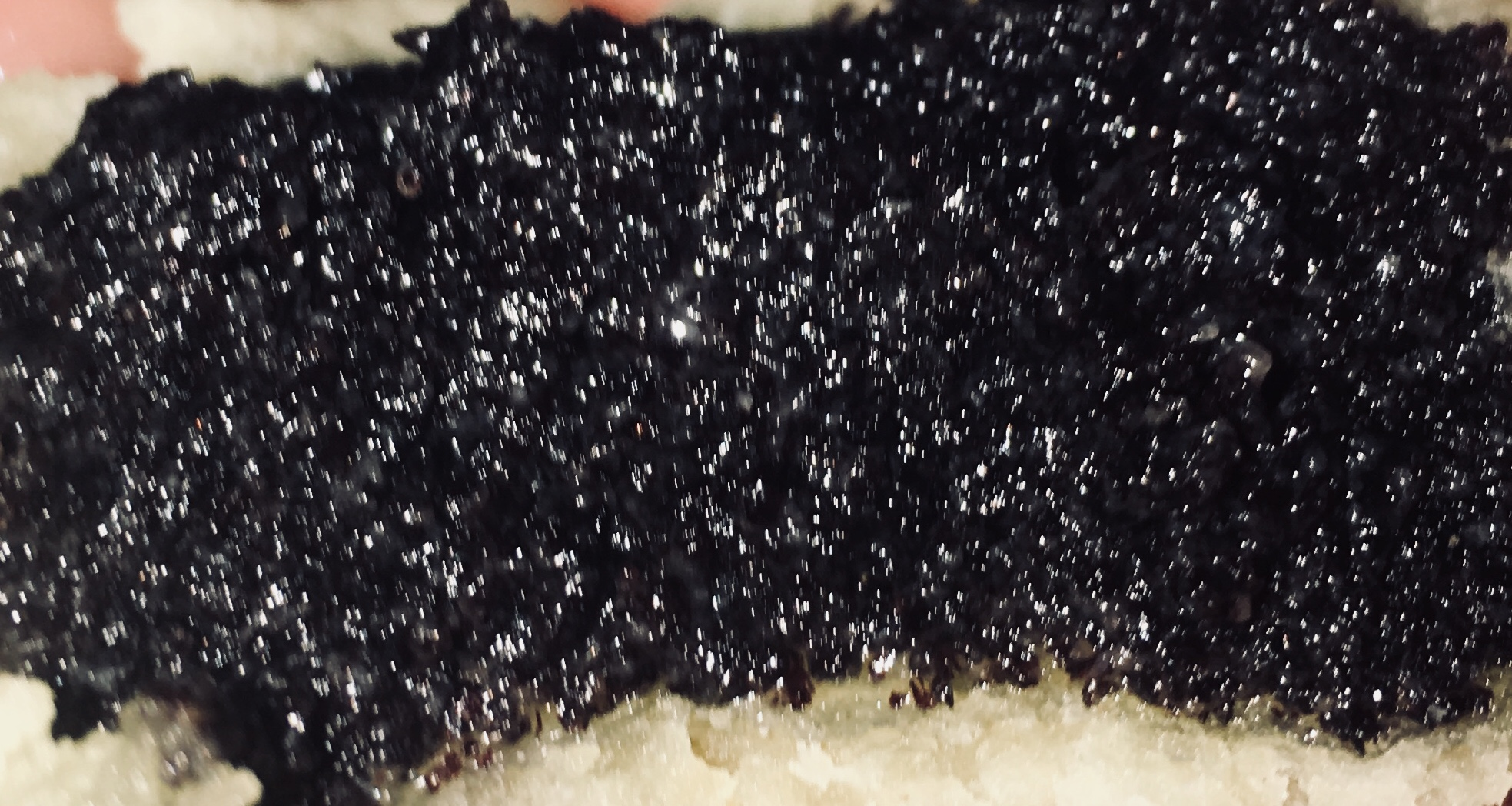
- Poppy seed paste used as a filling for hamantaschen
- Alternative names: Mohn, mak (Polish), mákos (Hungarian)
- Type: Spread, pastry filling
- Main ingredients: Poppyseeds (additional ingredients include sugar or honey and milk or water)

Poppy seed paste, also known as mák (Hungarian and West Slavic languages) or mohn (German and Yiddish), is a common ingredient in Central and Eastern European cuisine It is made from ground poppy seeds and additional sweeteners.

Examples of pastries featuring the filling include mohn kichel, mohn bars, babka, and hamantashen. Poppy seed-filled pastries are particularly associated with the Jewish holiday of Purim and Christian holiday of Christmas.

== Description ==
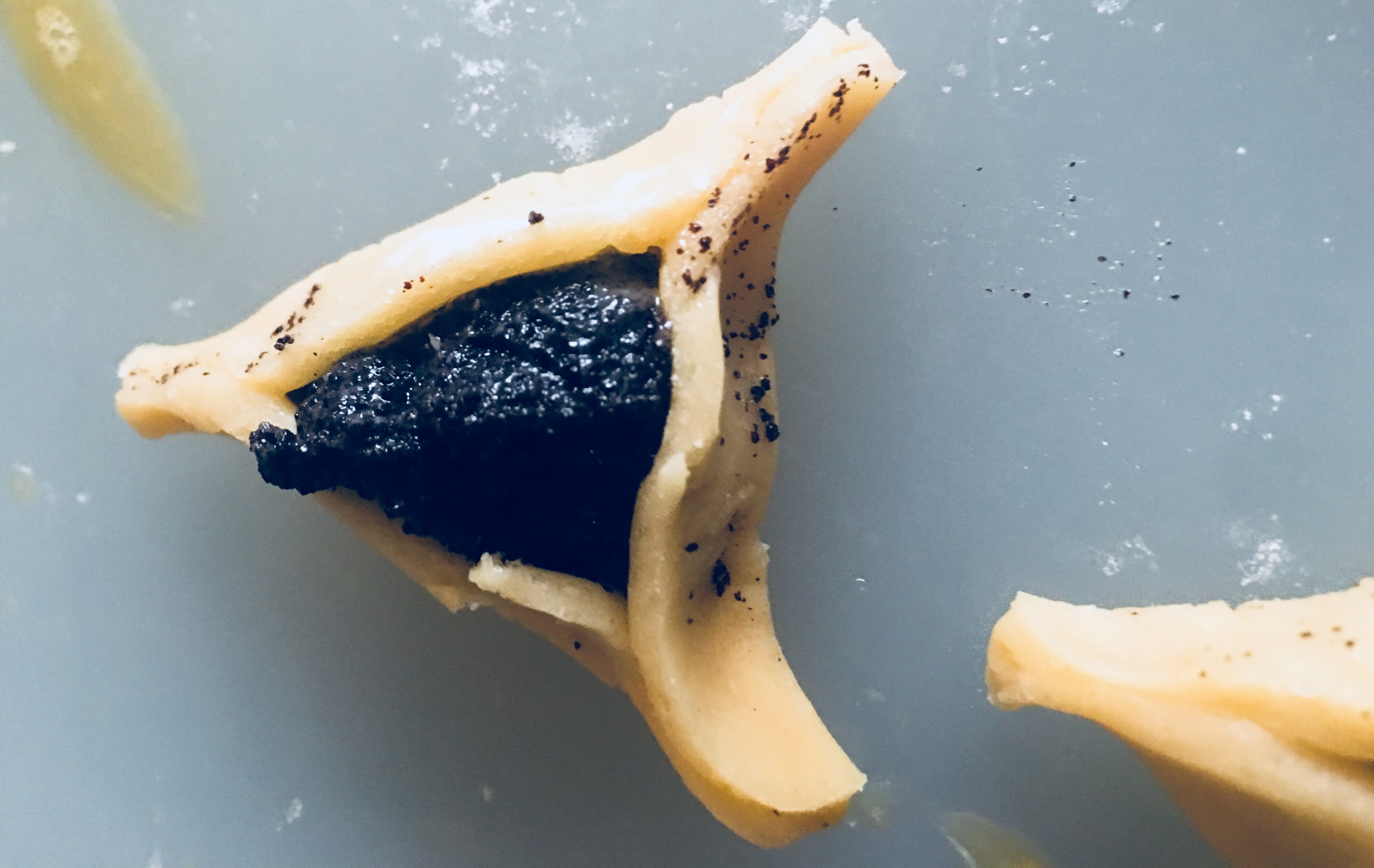
Mohn hamantashen

Poppy seed paste generally has a very thick, paste-like consistency similar to peanut butter or a thick custard, which can grow hard during cooking. It is typically sweet but has been said to have a subtle bitterness and citrus notes due to the poppy seeds. Sometimes lemon or orange zest is added to further accentuate these notes. As the poppy seeds have been ground to a powdery consistency, they have less of a tendency to get stuck in people's teeth than whole poppy seeds.

Poppy seed paste is widely used throughout Central and Eastern Europe. It is also eaten a savory filling in pierogi, or mixed with pasta and eaten for dinner. It is common to find in many pastries and bakeries all over Central Europe and the Balkans.

In Ashkenazi Jewish cuisine, there are two main kinds of poppy seed filling used to accommodate kosher dietary laws. Dairy mohn, which may contain milk, heavy cream, and/or butter; and which is used in baked goods such as hamantaschen which are made with a dough containing dairy and which will be served with a dairy meal. And pareve (non-dairy) poppy seed filling, which typically replaces the milk with water and the butter with margarine or oil, and is used in pastries that are meant to be served with meat meals such as mohn rolls, pareve hamantaschen, etc. Pareve poppy seed filling is suitable for vegan recipes.

== History ==
Poppy seeds were one of the most popular spices in medieval Central Europe.

Traditionally, poppy seed filling was almost exclusively prepared at home. Immigrants brought poppy seeds to the United States, with the first recipes for poppy seed cookies attested as early as 1889 in cookbooks published by German-Jewish immigrants. Beginning in the 20th century, various commercially-made canned varieties by brands such as "Solo" became available and are still sold online and in grocery stores in areas of the United States with significant Jewish populations such as the Northeast, Southern California, and South Florida. Homemade and premade renditions have significant differences in ingredients, and premade filling is generally dairy-free. Some assert that homemade filling is of superior quality as packaged poppy seed filling often contains ingredients such as high fructose corn syrup, and preservatives.

== Association with religious festivals ==
Pastries featuring poppy seed filling are associated with holidays in several cultures. In Ashkenazi Jewish culture, poppy seed-filled hamantashen (translated as "Haman's ears" or "Haman's pockets") are a traditional pastry eaten during Purim, and are one of the most well-known uses of poppy seed filling. Poppy seed pastries also feature widely in Polish, Czech, Slovak, and Hungarian Christmas traditions.

== Preparation ==
Poppy seed paste is prepared by grinding poppy seeds in a coffee grinder, blender, or food processor for several minutes until they reach a powdery consistency but before they turn into a paste. Grinding the poppy seeds helps release their natural oils, which enhances the flavor of the final product, as well as their starches, which help thicken the filling, and it also helps the poppy seeds not get stuck in the eater's teeth.

Depending on the recipe, milk (or water) and sugar (or sometimes honey or silan) are simmered in a saucepan until the sugar dissolves and the liquid is thoroughly heated. The ground poppy seeds, along with a flavoring such as lemon zest or vanilla extract, are added, and sometimes other ingredients such as chopped walnuts are added. The mixture is stirred continuously until it thickens and reaches a jam-like consistency. At this point, it is typically removed from the heat, and sometimes apricot jam may be added for flavor, and cake crumbs or matzo meal may be added as a binder and to help ensure the paste does not leak out when used as a filling in baked goods. It is then allowed to cool and refrigerated before being used as a filling or spread. It has a shelf life of approximately 3 days.

== See also ==
- Lekvar
- Rugelach
