= Mohn kichel =

Ashkenazi Jewish cookie

- Alternative names: Mohn kichelach, mon kichel, mun kichel, poppy seed kichel, poppy seed cookies
- Type: Cookie or pastry
- Place of origin: Ashkenazi Jewish communities
- Main ingredients: Flour, poppy seeds, sugar, egg, oil or butter

Mohn kichel, also known as mon kichel, or poppy seed kichel, is an Ashkenazi Jewish cookie made with poppy seeds. Mohn kichel were popular among the inhabitants of the shtetl, as they were more economical to make than other Jewish cookies such as rugelach. Despite its similar name, mohn kichel bears little resemblance to the light, airy and crisp kichel to whom it is similarly baked, as mohn kichel is generally thin, crisp, and rectangular-shaped.

== Overview ==
Mohn kichel are a cookie flavored with poppy seeds, and generally made from a pareve (non-dairy) Dough, although dairy versions exist. Mohn kichel have been called a "peasant cookie" by some, and originate from the shtetls or impoverished Jewish villages of Eastern Europe. Their popularity has declined over the years in favor of other cookies containing chocolate, etc., and many nostalgically recollect their bubbes (Jewish grandmother) baking them. However, they are still available, and generally consist of a rectangular or square-shaped cookie that is crisp and not very thick. They contain poppy seeds (mohn), from which they derived their name, and the poppy seeds are generally left whole, unlike in hamantash; which lends the mohn kichel their signature crunchy texture, which some have disparagingly described as gritty. Another variant exists, which is more similar to a butter cookie or shortbread as it is thicker and has a richer, more buttery texture.

== Vegan variation ==
A vegan, gluten-free variation of mohn kichel exists, containing no eggs, which uses brown rice and tapioca flour, substituting the wheat flour, and coconut oil is used instead of cooking oil or butter.

== See also ==
- Kichel
- Hamantash
- Rugelach
