= Hamantash =

Ashkenazi Jewish pastry associated with Purim

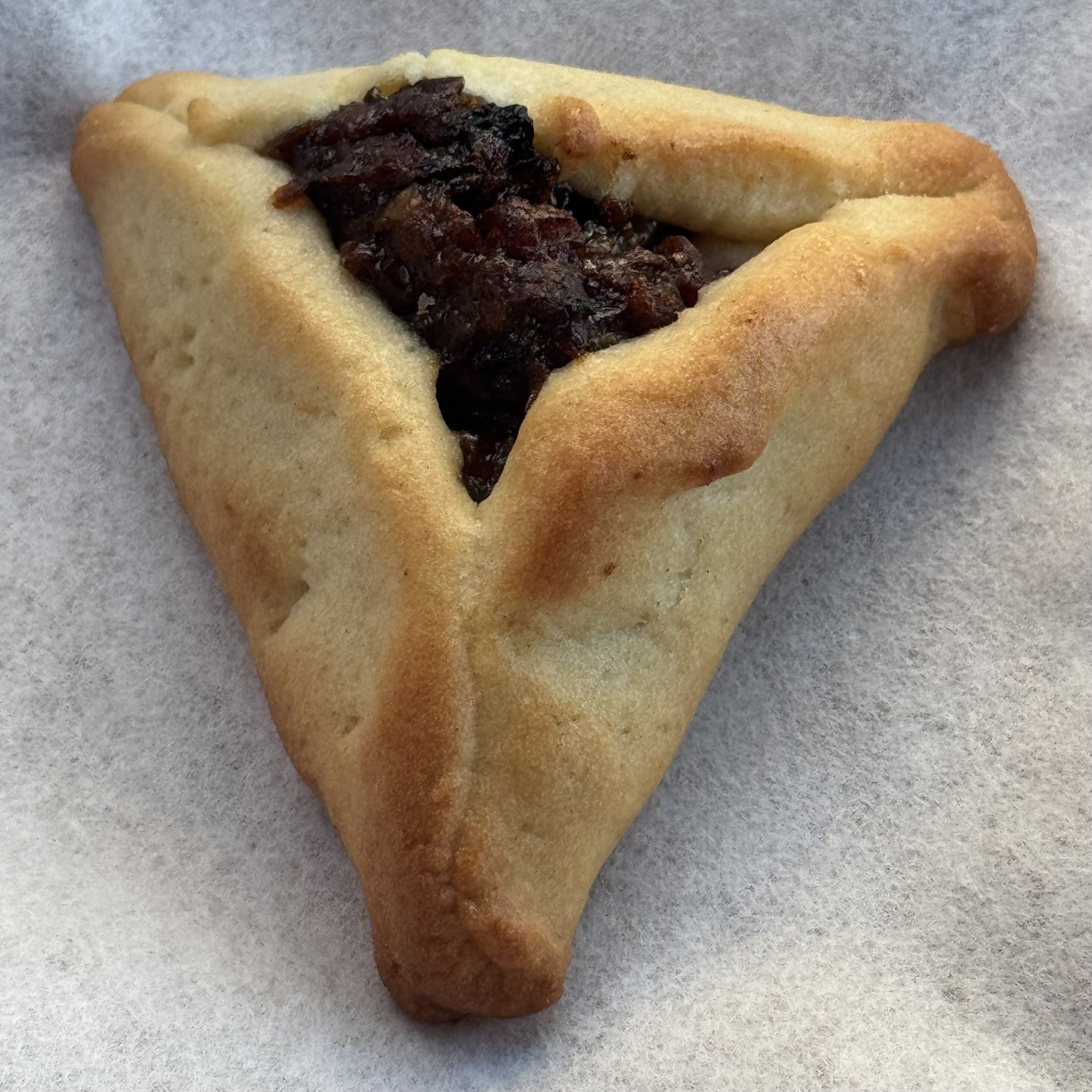
- Date-filled hamantash
- Alternative names: Oznei Haman
- Type: Cookie
- Place of origin: Ashkenazi Jewish communities
- Variations: Filling: traditionally poppy seed or prune

A hamantash (pl.: hamantashen; also spelled hamantasch, hamantaschen; Yiddish: המן־טאַש homentash, pl.: המן־טאַשן homentashn, 'Haman pockets') is an Ashkenazi Jewish triangular filled-pocket biscuit associated with the Jewish holiday of Purim. The name refers to Haman, the villain in the Purim story. In Hebrew, hamantashen are also known as אוזני המן (oznei Haman), meaning "Haman's ears". "Haman's ears" also refers to a Sephardic Purim biscuit, "Orejas de Haman", thought to originate in Spain and Italy, that is made by frying twisted or rolled strips of dough.

Traditionally, the dough for hamantashen was made with yeast. With the invention of baking powder during the 1840s and its wide adoption during the first half of the twentieth century, baking powder supplanted yeast, and hamantashen dough became a cookie rather than bread dough. To shape a hamantash, a filling is placed in the center of a circle of dough, which is then either folded in half and shaped into a triangle or the sides are brought to the center to form a triangle. The oldest and most traditional filling is mohn (poppy seed paste), with powidl or lekvar (prune jam) a close second. The cookie dough variety has spawned many different fillings, traditionally sweet. Most popular are various jams, especially apricot and raspberry, but also date, raisins, apple, vanilla pastry cream with chocolate chips, cherry, fig, chocolate, dulce de leche, halva, caramel, or cheese. The dough varies from hard like shortbread to a soft yeast dough.

== Etymology and symbolism ==
In Yiddish, the word homentash is singular, while homentashn is the plural form. However, hamantashen is the more common word form among English speakers, even when referring to a single pastry (for example, "I ate a poppy seed hamantashen").

Hamantash is also spelled hamentasch, homentash, homentasch, homentaschan, or even (h)umentash. The name hamantash is commonly viewed as a reference to Haman, the villain of Purim, as described in the Book of Esther. The pastries are supposed to symbolize the defeated enemy of the Jewish people. The word tash means "pouch" or "pocket" in Yiddish, and thus may refer to Haman's pockets, symbolizing the money that Haman offered to Ahasuerus in exchange for permission to destroy the Jews, but this is just a folk etymology and has no basis in history.

Another possible source of the name is a folk etymology: the Yiddish word מאָן־טאַשן (montashn) for a traditional delicacy, literally meaning "poppyseed pouch", was transformed to hamantashen, likely by association with Haman or inclusion of the Hebrew article ha- (ה). In Israel, hamantashen are called oznei Haman (Hebrew: אוזני המן), Hebrew for "Haman's ears" in reference to their defeated enemy's ears, although "Haman's ears" also refers to a Sephardic Purim pastry that is twisted or rolled and fried.

The reason for the three-sided shape is uncertain. There is a 20th-century legend that Haman wore a three-cornered hat. Alternatively, the Midrash says that when Haman recognized the merit of the Three Patriarchs, his strength immediately weakened.

A simpler explanation is that the shape derives from traditional Jewish baking techniques in Central Europe for folding dough so as to form a pouch around a filling, also common for making dumplings.

== Sweet fillings ==
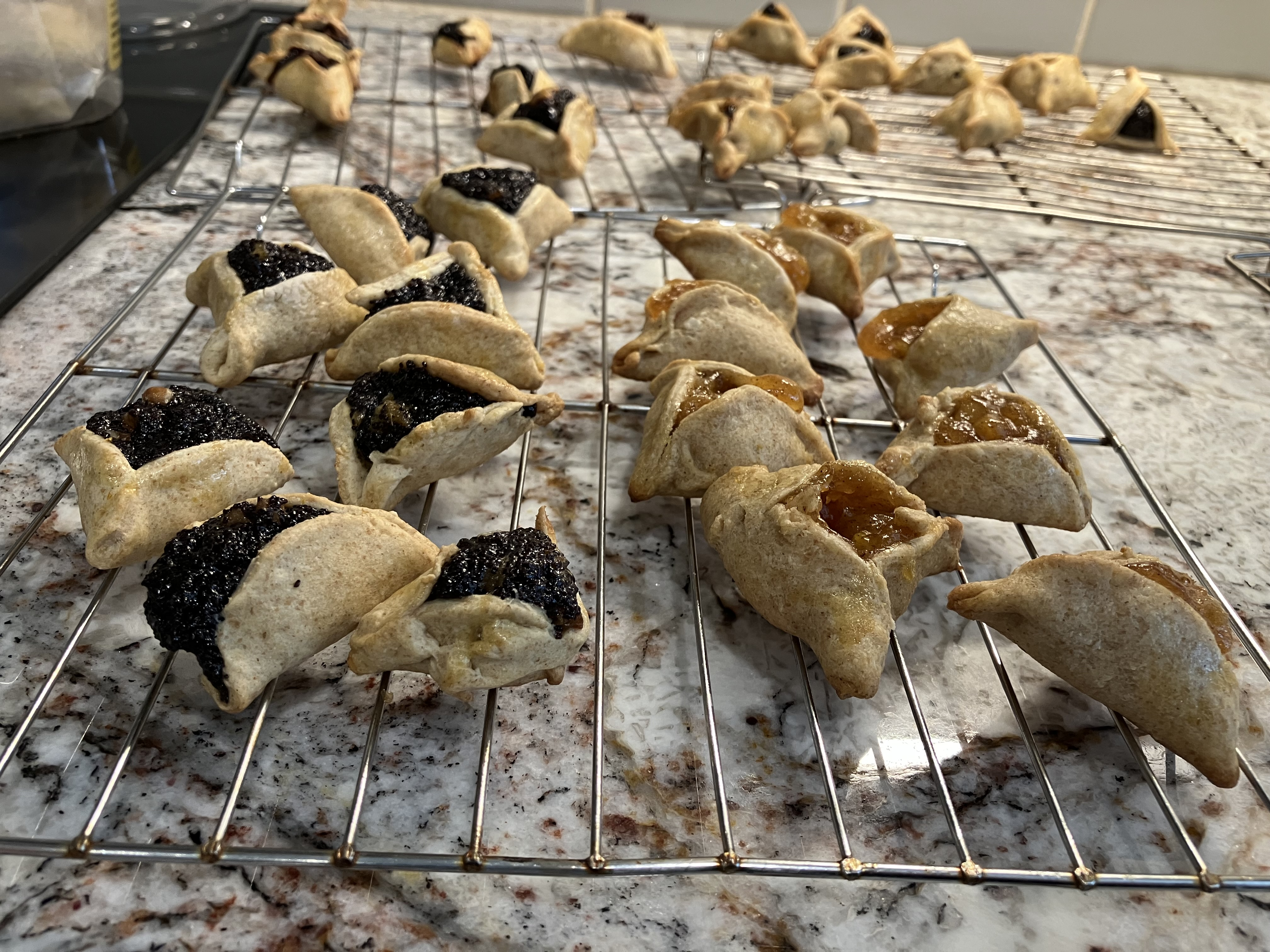
Poppy seed and apricot jam hamantashen

Sweet hamantashen fillings range from traditional options such as mohn (poppy seed), powidl or lekvar (prune), apricot jam, and date (especially popular in Israel) to raisin, apple, cherry, fig, chocolate, dulce de leche, halva, caramel, and cheese.

=== Prune ===
The prune hamantash was invented in 1731 by David Brandeis of Jung-Bunzlau, Bohemia. The daughter of a Christian bookbinder purchased from Brandeis powidl (plum jam) which she claimed had made her family ill, as her father coincidentally died a few days after eating it. The burgomaster of the city ordered the closure of Brandeis's store and imprisoned him, his wife, and son for selling poisonous food to Christians. Investigations by municipal authorities and the court of appeal in Prague revealed that the bookbinder had died of consumption and the charges were dismissed.

Brandeis wrote a scroll which he called Shir HaMa'alot l'David ("A Song of Ascents to David"), to be read on 10 Adar, accompanied by a festive meal. He was freed from prison four days before Purim after the charges against him were proven to be false, and in celebration of his release, Jews from his city celebrated with povidl or plum hamantashen.

== Preparation ==
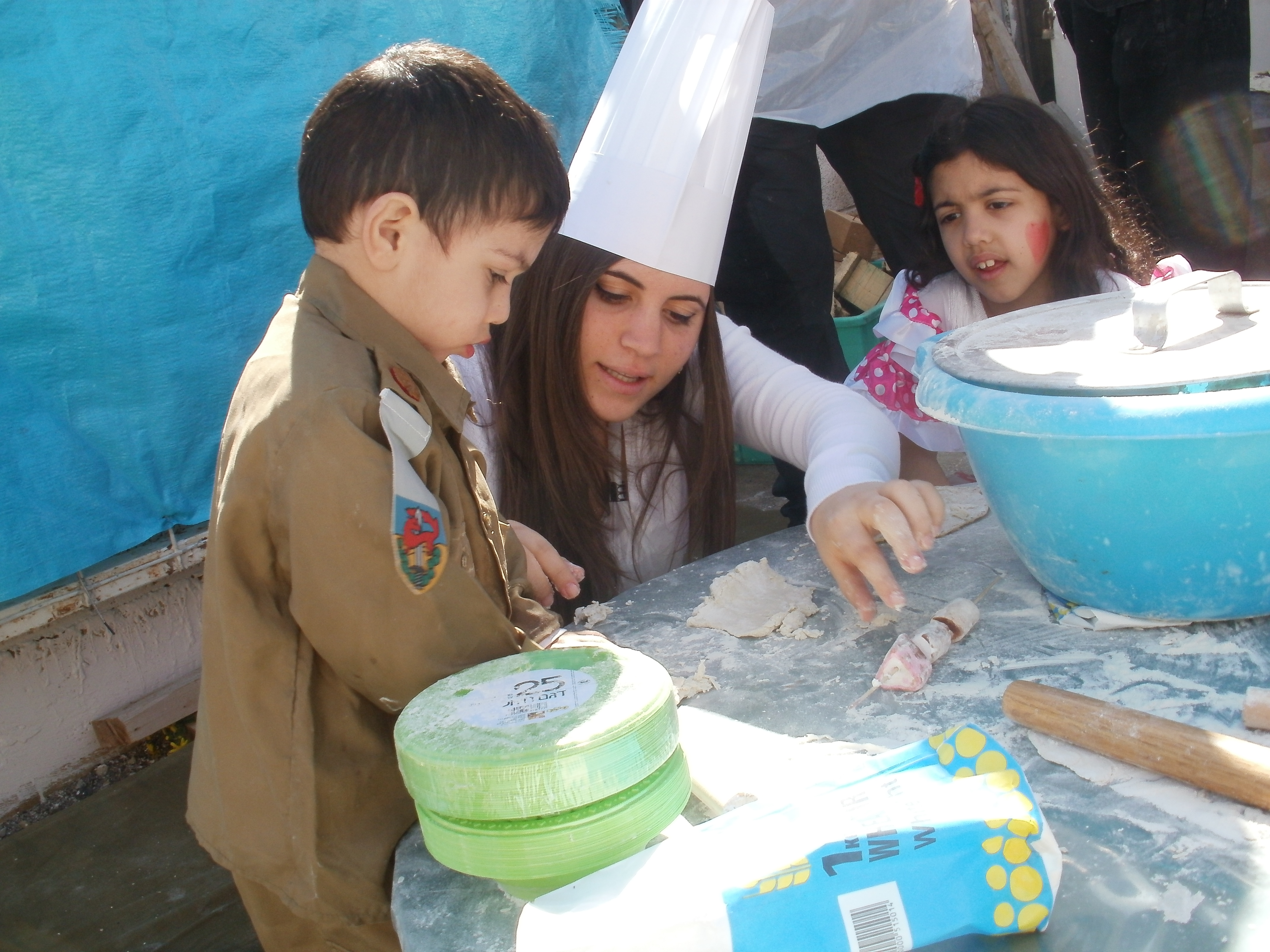
Volunteers in Israel preparing hamantashen for Purim with the children of fallen soldiers

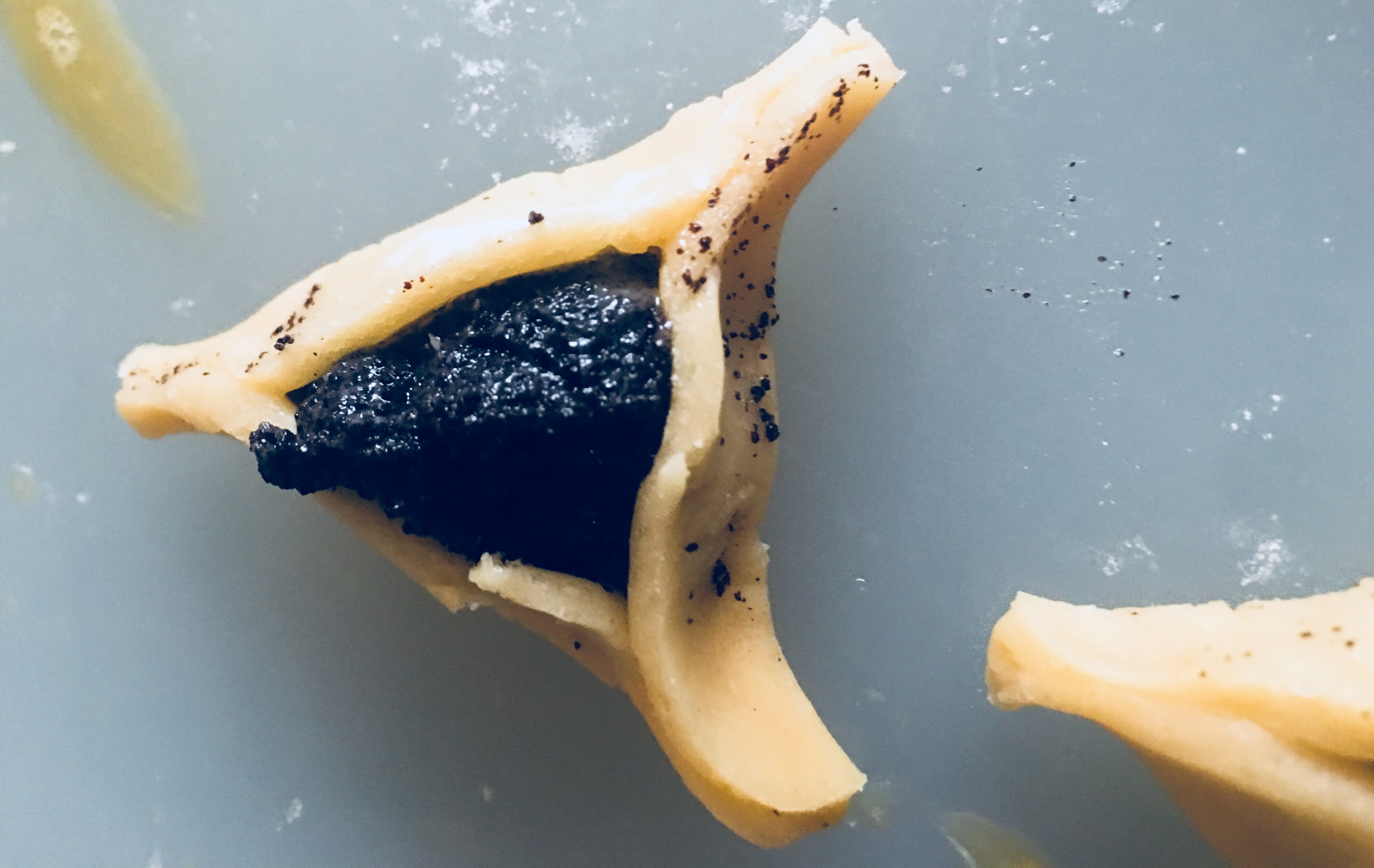
Poppy seed hamantashen prior to baking

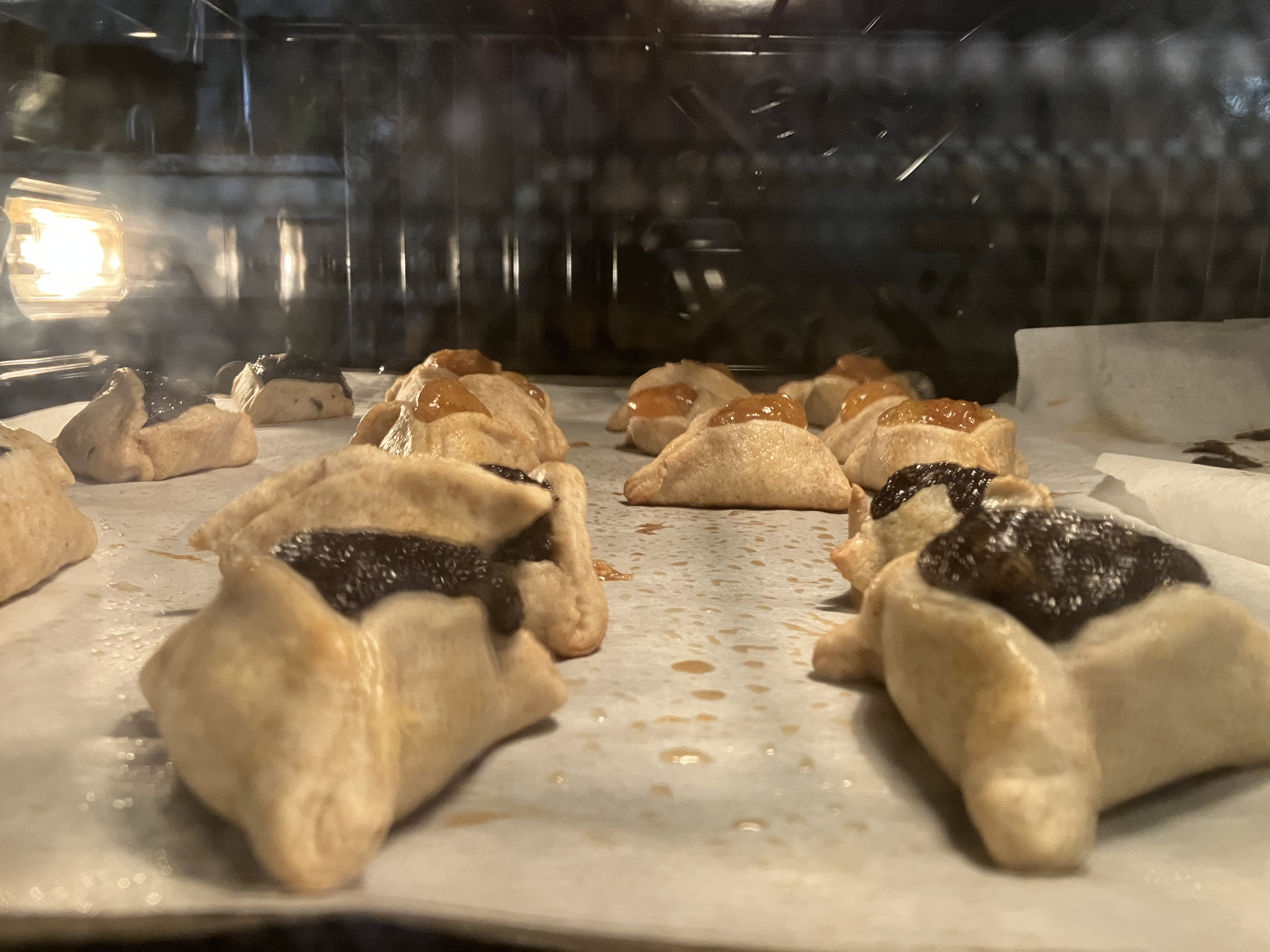
Baking hamantashen in an oven

Sweet hamantashen are typically made with a dough containing butter or less commonly a pareve dough containing oil. Depending on the ingredients used in the dough, the consistency of the finished baking powder hamantash can range from dry and crumbly like shortbread, to soft and cakey like a black and white cookie, to firm and crisp like a butter cookie. The dough is generally prepared with flour, eggs, sugar, butter (or margarine or cooking oil), and a flavoring such as vanilla (or sometimes cocoa, grated lemon rind, rose water, or orange blossom water); sometimes milk is used in the dough; and usually a leavener such as baking powder or baking soda is added as well. The dough is then mixed gently so as to incorporate all the ingredients together without making the dough tough.

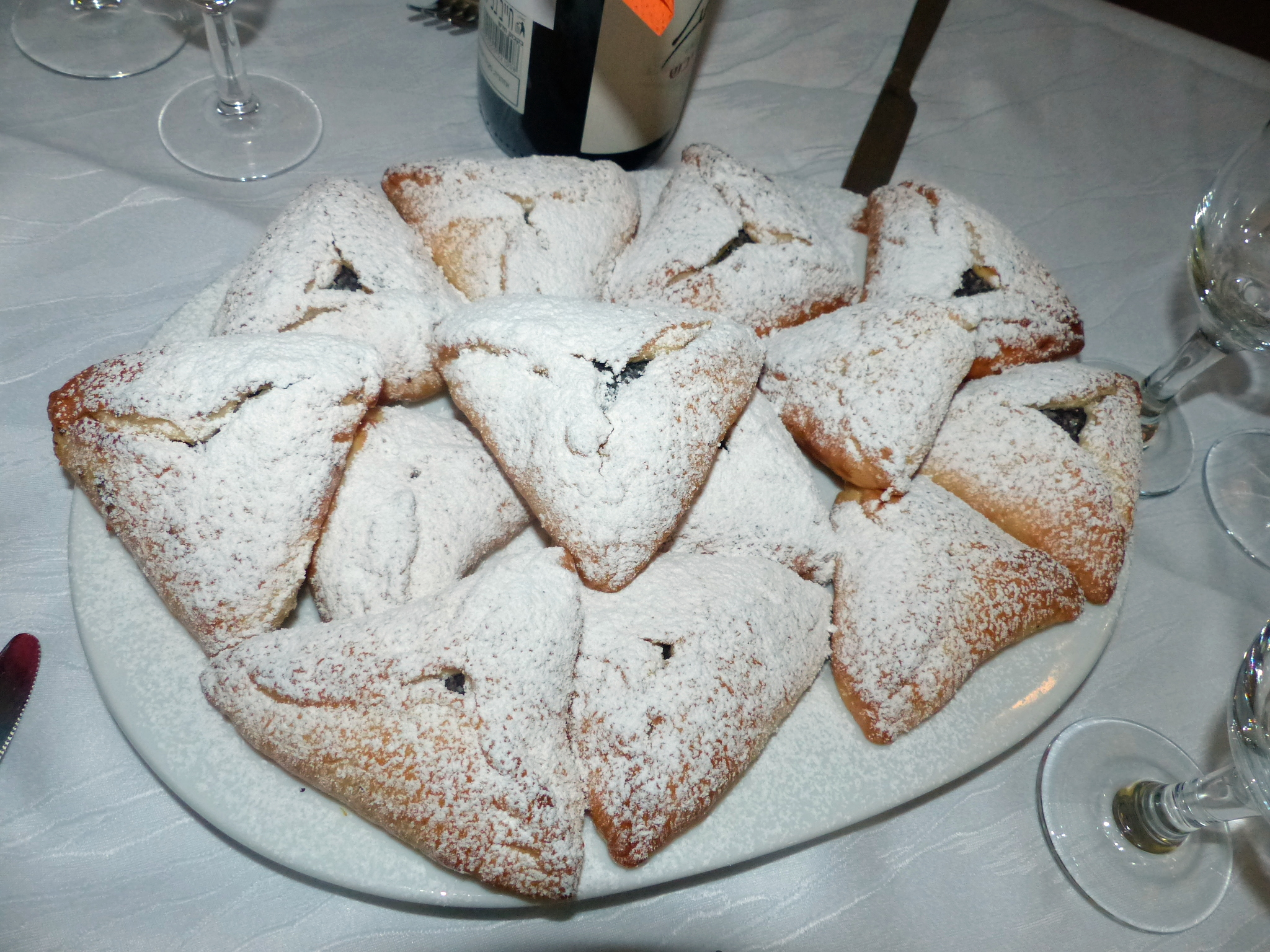
Hamantashen served dusted with powdered sugar

The dough is allowed to rest in the refrigerator and then is removed and rolled out to a thickness of between 3–6 mm (1/8–1/4 in). Rounds of dough are stamped out and often brushed with an egg wash to encourage sealing prior to the addition of the filling (or the finished hamentash is brushed with egg wash before baking to produce a shiny golden surface). The most popular filling is poppyseed, but apricot, prune, strawberry, raspberry, chocolate, peanut butter and jelly, and others are also common. The bottom and the top two corners of the dough are folded inward but do not fully enclose the filling, allowing it to remain visible. Sometimes hamantashen may be frozen for a short period of time after shaping in order to prevent leakage of the filling. Then they are baked in an oven at medium heat for a short time. Sometimes after baking hamantashen may be dusted with powdered sugar, dipped in melted chocolate, or topped with sprinkles.

== Hamantashen in Israel ==
"In recent years, Israeli bakeries have increasingly offered gourmet versions of the three-cornered cookie—marzipan, say, or gluten-free varieties—alongside the classics, like poppyseed. The change reflects the growing sophistication of Israel’s culinary scene, which is focused on updating traditional dishes and fusing them with cuisines from around the world."

— Andrew Tobin, The Times of Israel

Hamantashen are known as oznei Haman in Israel, a term that also refers to the Sephardic pastry "Orejas de Haman", twisted or rolled strips of dough that are fried, and are the most popular cookie sold at bakeries across Israel in the weeks leading up to Purim each year, with both large chains and small independent bakeries offering many different varieties. As in the diaspora, poppyseed remains the most-popular filling, with chocolate in second, and date filling coming in third in popularity. Jam is not nearly as common a filling as in America.

== See also ==
- Ashkenazi Jewish cuisine
- Jam tart
- Latke–Hamantash Debate
- Ma'amoul – a similar Mizrahi Jewish filled cookie traditionally served for Purim
