= List of Israeli dishes =

The following is a list of Israeli dishes. For the cuisine, see Israeli cuisine (Hebrew: המטבח הישראלי).

== Main dishes ==
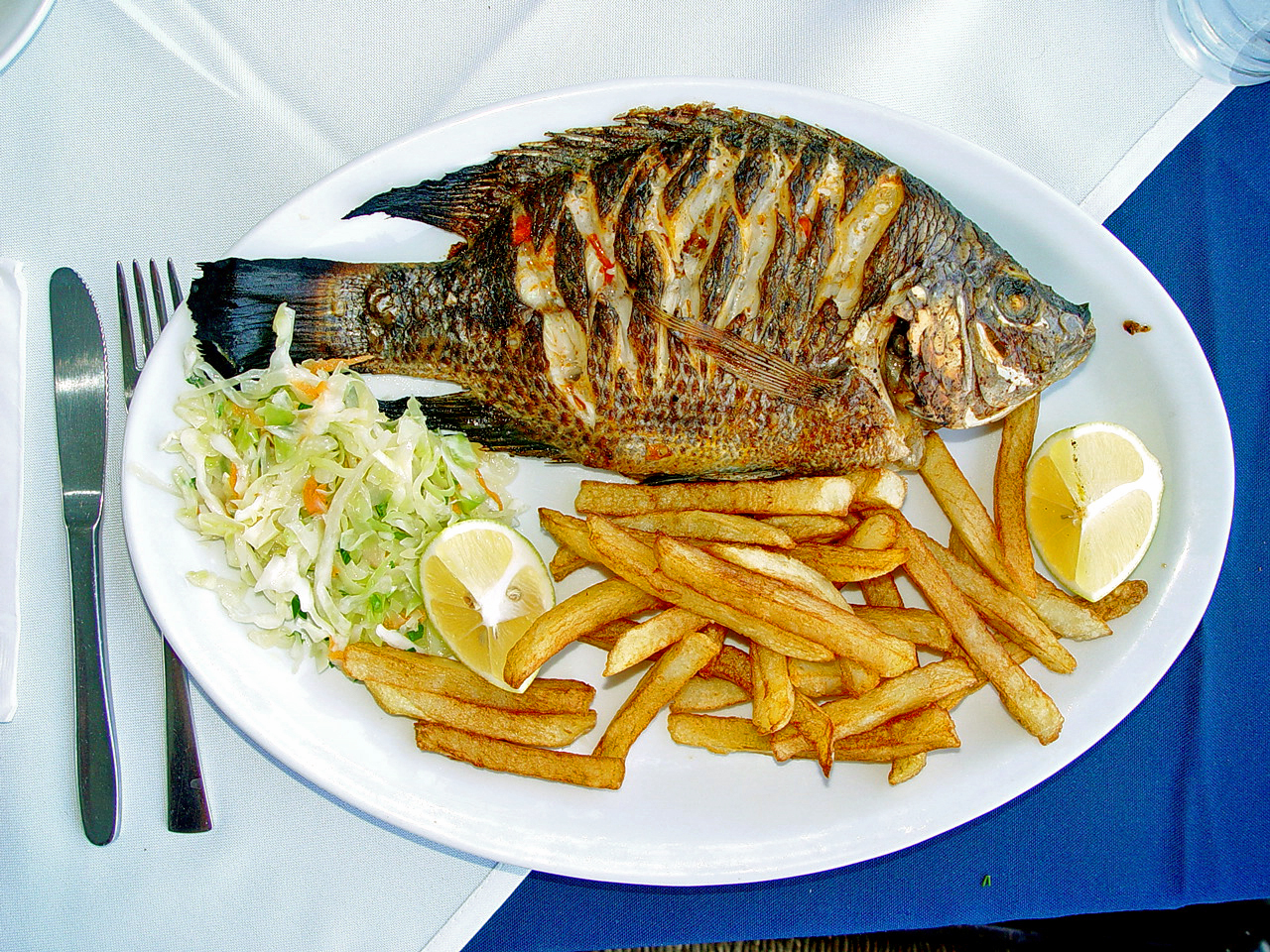
St. Peter's fish (tilapia) in a restaurant in Tiberias, Israel

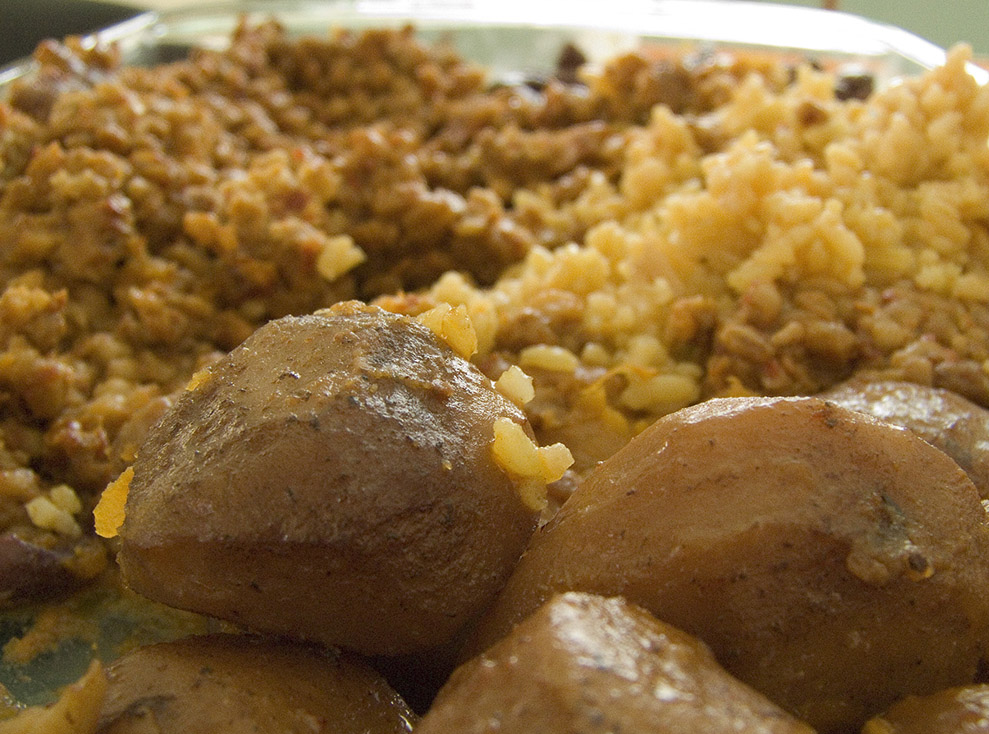
Hamin

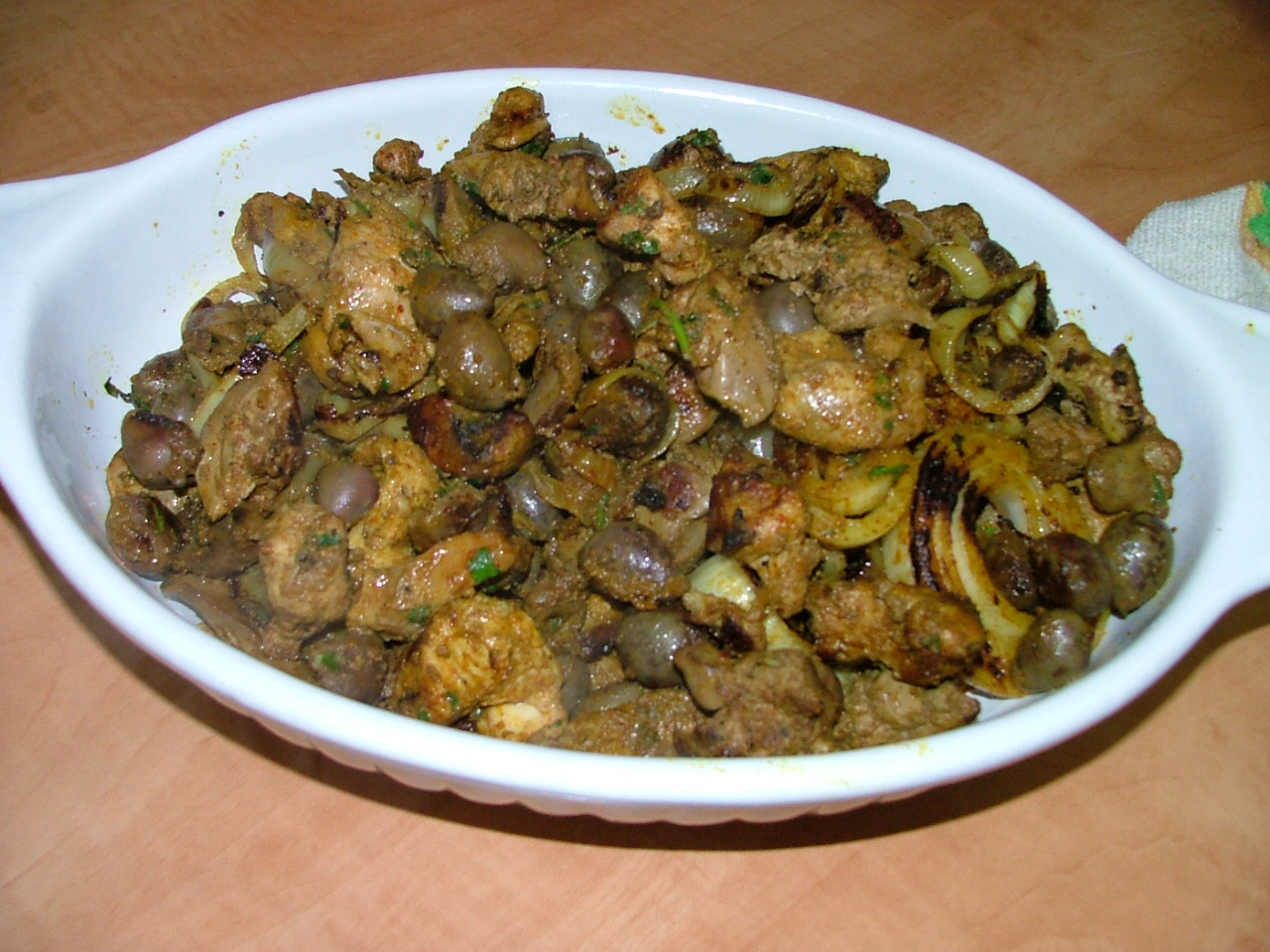
Jerusalem mixed grill

=== Meat ===
- Me'orav Yerushalmi (Jerusalem mixed grill)—originating in Jerusalem, a mixed grill of chicken hearts, spleens and liver mixed with bits of lamb cooked on a flat grill, seasoned with a spice blend and served with rice, mujaddara or bamia
- Kubba seleq—stew or soup made of beet
- Merguez—a spicy sausage originating in North Africa, mainly eaten grilled in Israel
- Moussaka—oven-baked layered ground-meat and eggplant casserole
- Schnitzel—fried chicken breast with breadcrumb or spice-flavored flour coating
- Shashlik—skewered and grilled cubes of meat
- Kabanos — is a long, thin, dry sausage usually made of pork which originated in Poland, and is also very popular in Israel

=== Fish ===
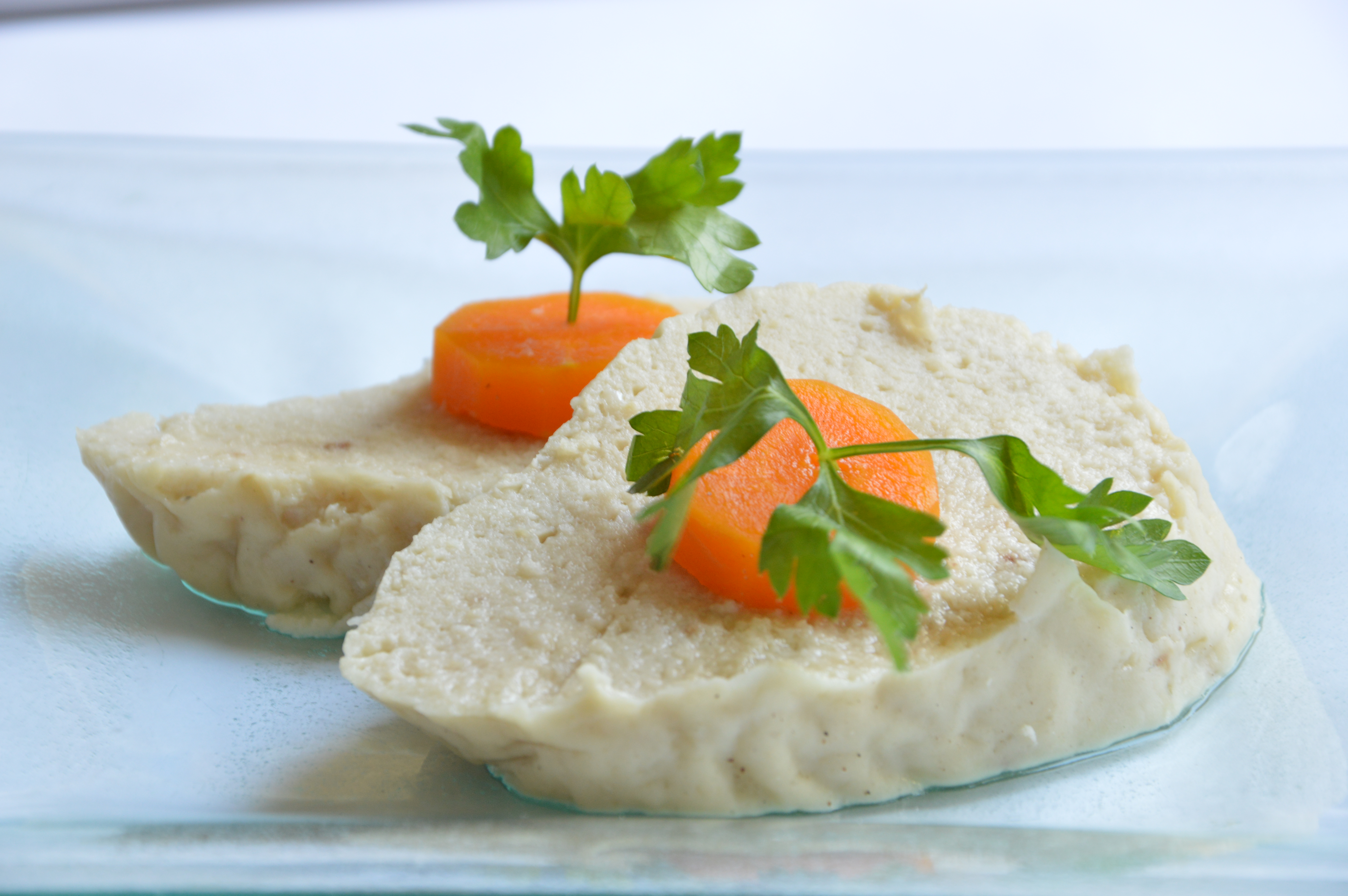
Gefilte fish topped with slices of carrot

- Denesse—in the coastal region, baked with yogurt, tomatoes, garlic, dried mint and cucumbers; also prepared fried
- Gefilte fish—traditional Ashkenazi Jewish quenelles made of carp, whitefish, or pike, typically eaten as an appetizer

=== Vegetarian ===
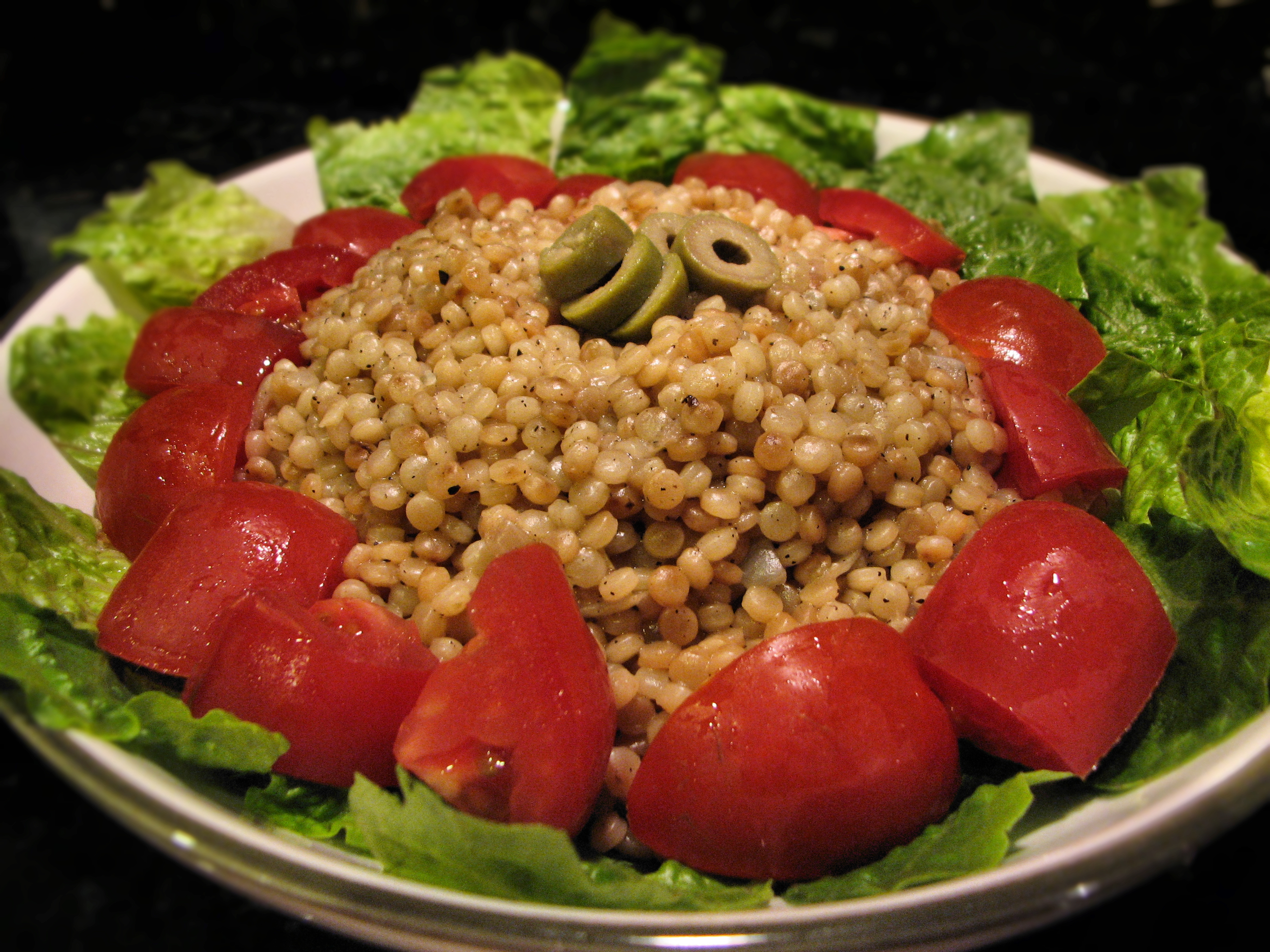
Ptitim

- Brik—thin pastry around a filling, commonly deep fried
- Burgul—wheat, cooked in many ways
- Hamin—long-cooked Shabbat stews made with a variety of meats, grains and root vegetables
- Jakhnun—pastry served on Shabbat morning with fresh grated tomato and skhug, eaten for breakfast especially on Shabbat
- Khachapuri—bread filled with eggs and cheese
- Ktzitzot khubeza—a patty made of mallow, bulgur/bread crumbs, eggs, onion, olive oil
- Kubba bamia—dumplings made of semolina or rice and okra cooked in a tomato stew or soup
- Macaroni Hamin—a traditional Sephardic Jerusalemite dish, originally from the Jewish Quarter of the Old City of Jerusalem
- Malawach—bread eaten with fresh grated tomato and skhug
- Orez Shu'it—white beans cooked in a tomato stew and served on rice
- Ptitim—toasted pasta shaped like rice grains
- Ziva—puff pastry topped with sesame seeds and filled with cheese and olives

== Soups ==
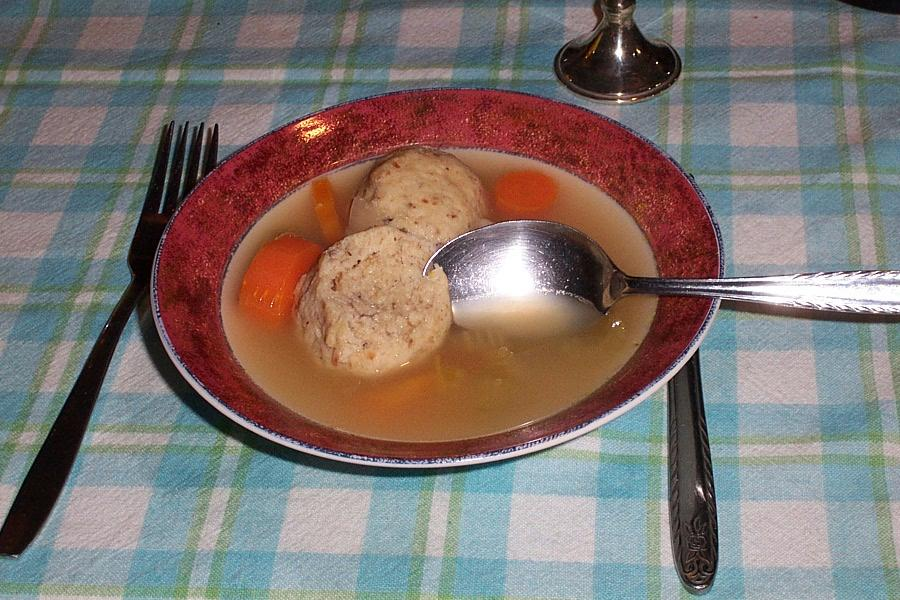
Soup with matzah balls

- Maraq 'Adashim—lentil soup cooked with tomato sauce
- Maraq Shuit—white-bean soup cooked with tomato sauce
- Matzah ball—dropped into a pot of salted boiling water or chicken soup, a staple food on Passover.
- Shkedei marak—small yellow squares made from flour and palm oil.

== Meze ==
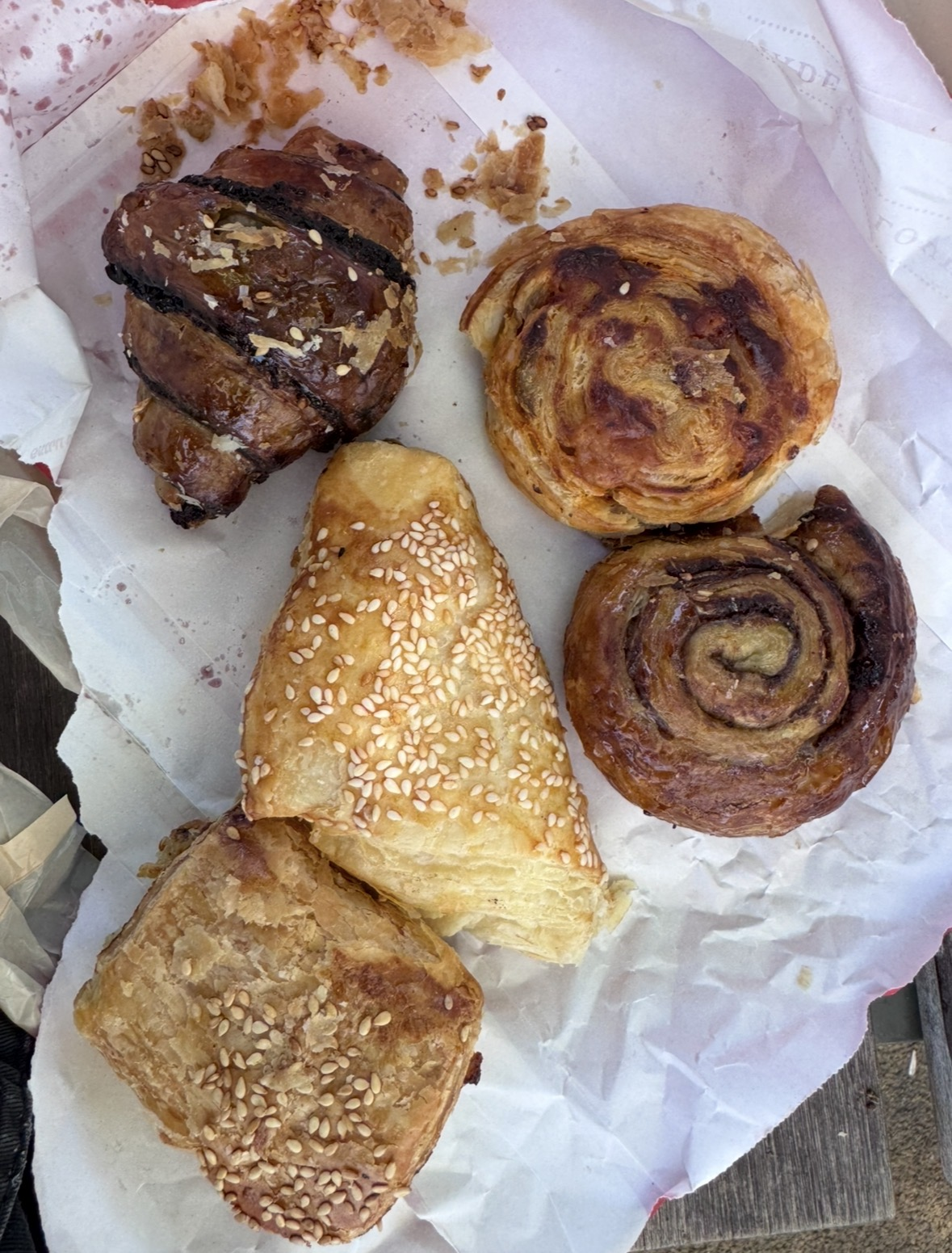
Bourekas and Rugelach

- Bourekas—phyllo or puff pastry filled with vegetables, cheese, meat, spices, herbs, nuts, pickles, etc. (comes from börek)
- Kreplach—small dumplings filled with ground meat, mashed potatoes or another filling, usually boiled and served in chicken soup, though they may also be served fried.

=== Salads and dips ===
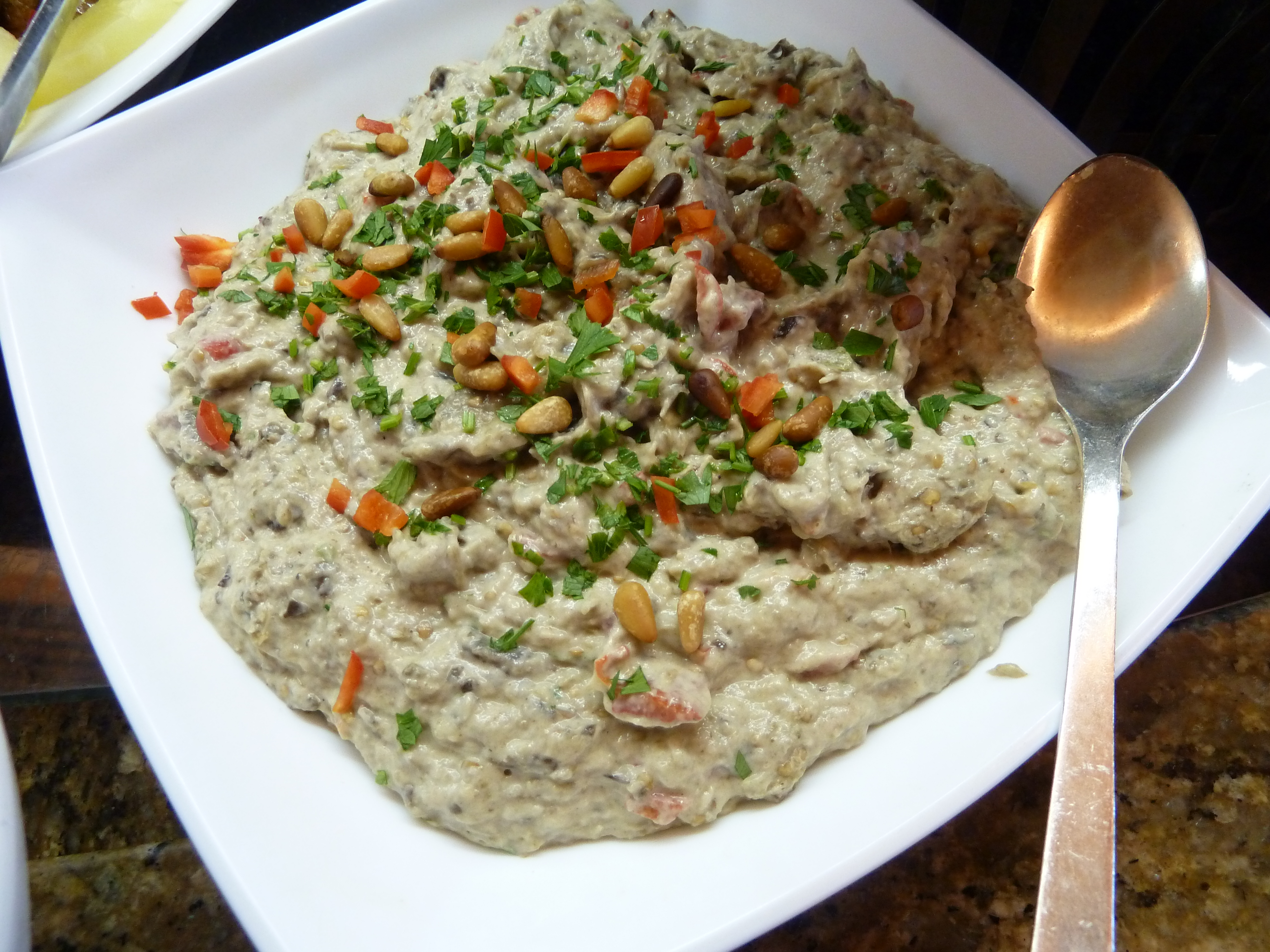
Salat ḥatzilim b'mayonnaise

- Cabbage salad
- Carrot salad
- Coleslaw
- Greek salad
- Ḥamutzim—vegetables pickled in a pot, such as cucumber and cabbage, eggplant, carrot, turnip, radish, onion, caper, lemon, olives, cauliflower, tomatoes, chili, bell pepper, garlic and beans
- Israeli salad—made with tomatoes, cucumbers, onions, parsley
- Matbucha—cooked dish of tomatoes and roasted bell peppers seasoned with garlic and chili pepper
- Salat avocado—rural salad made of avocados, with oil olive, salt, lemon juice and chopped scallions
- Salat ḥatzilim b'mayonnaise—contains fried eggplant, mayonnaise, garlic
- Sabich salad—rural salad dish, the ingredients are almost the same as in sabich itself without the hummus and pita bread

=== Cheeses and yogurts ===
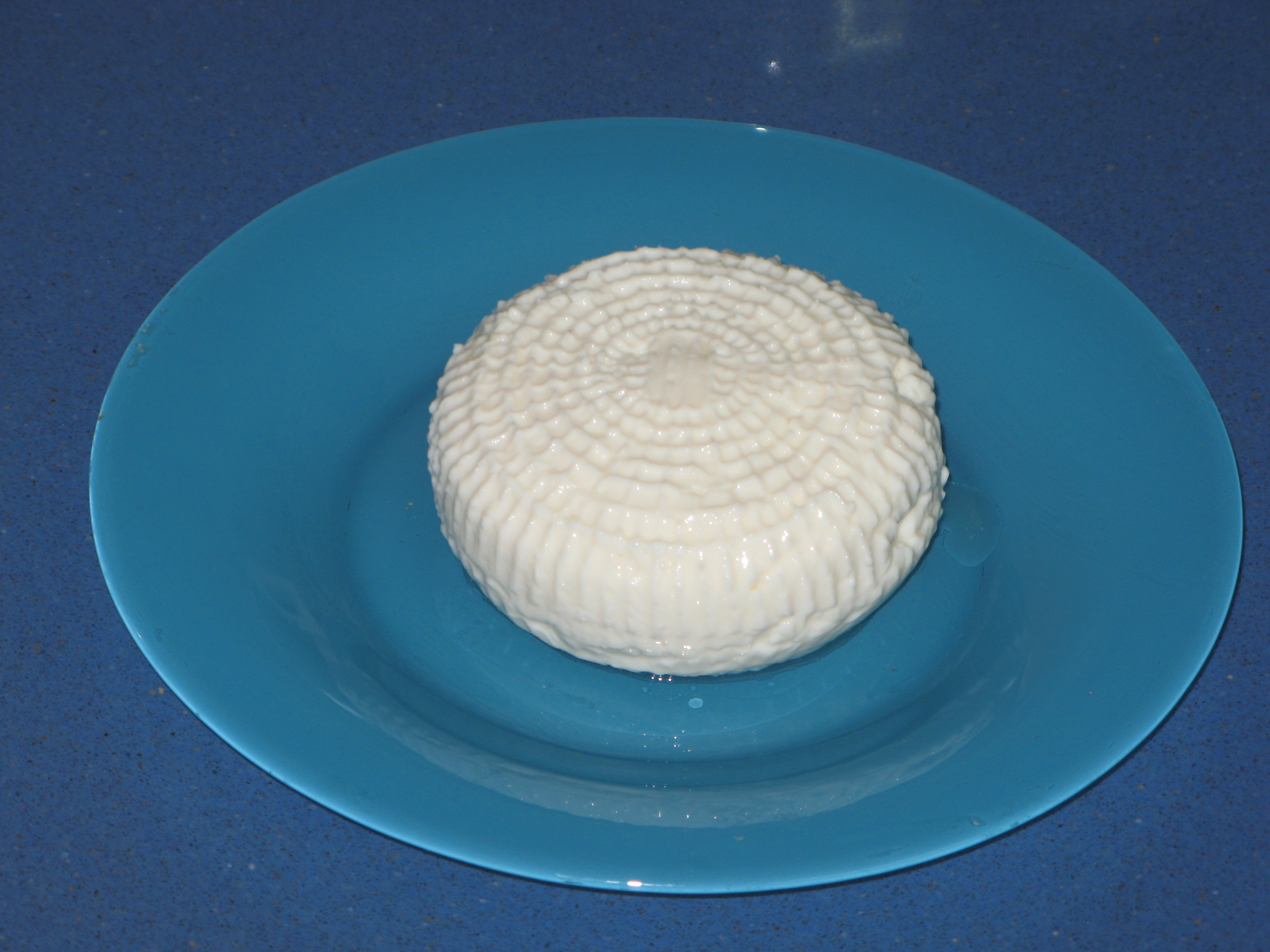
Safed cheese (Tzfat)

- Cottage cheese
- Feta cheese
- Gvina levana—Israeli quark cheese, sold in different fat content variations (1-2%, 3%, 5% and 9%)
- Milky—yogurt with chocolate pudding, vanilla whipped-cream and other variations
- Sirene—a type of brined cheese made in the Balkans
- Tzfat cheese—semi-hard salty sheep milk cheese

== Spices and condiments ==
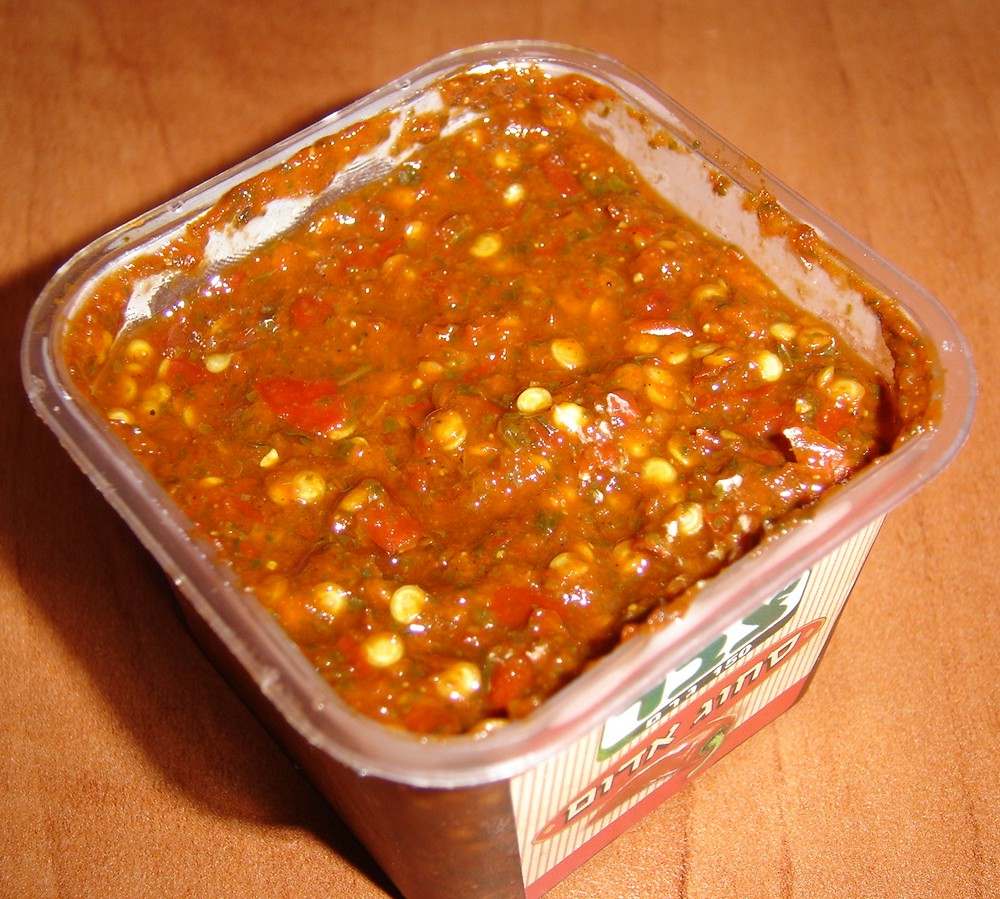
Skhug

- Ras el hanout—used in many savory dishes, sometimes rubbed on meat or fish, or stirred into couscous, pasta or rice
- Sumac—dried fruits are ground to produce a tangy, crimson spice
- Hawaij—a variety of Yemeni ground spice mixtures
- Filfel chuma—a chili-garlic paste similar to a hot sauce originating from Libyan Jews
- Skhug—the hot sauce of choice in the Middle East, made from chili peppers, cilantro, and various spices, red or green, depending on the color of the chilis
- Amba—tangy mango pickle condiment of Iraqi-Jewish and Kurdish-Jewish origin

== Breads ==
=== Breads ===
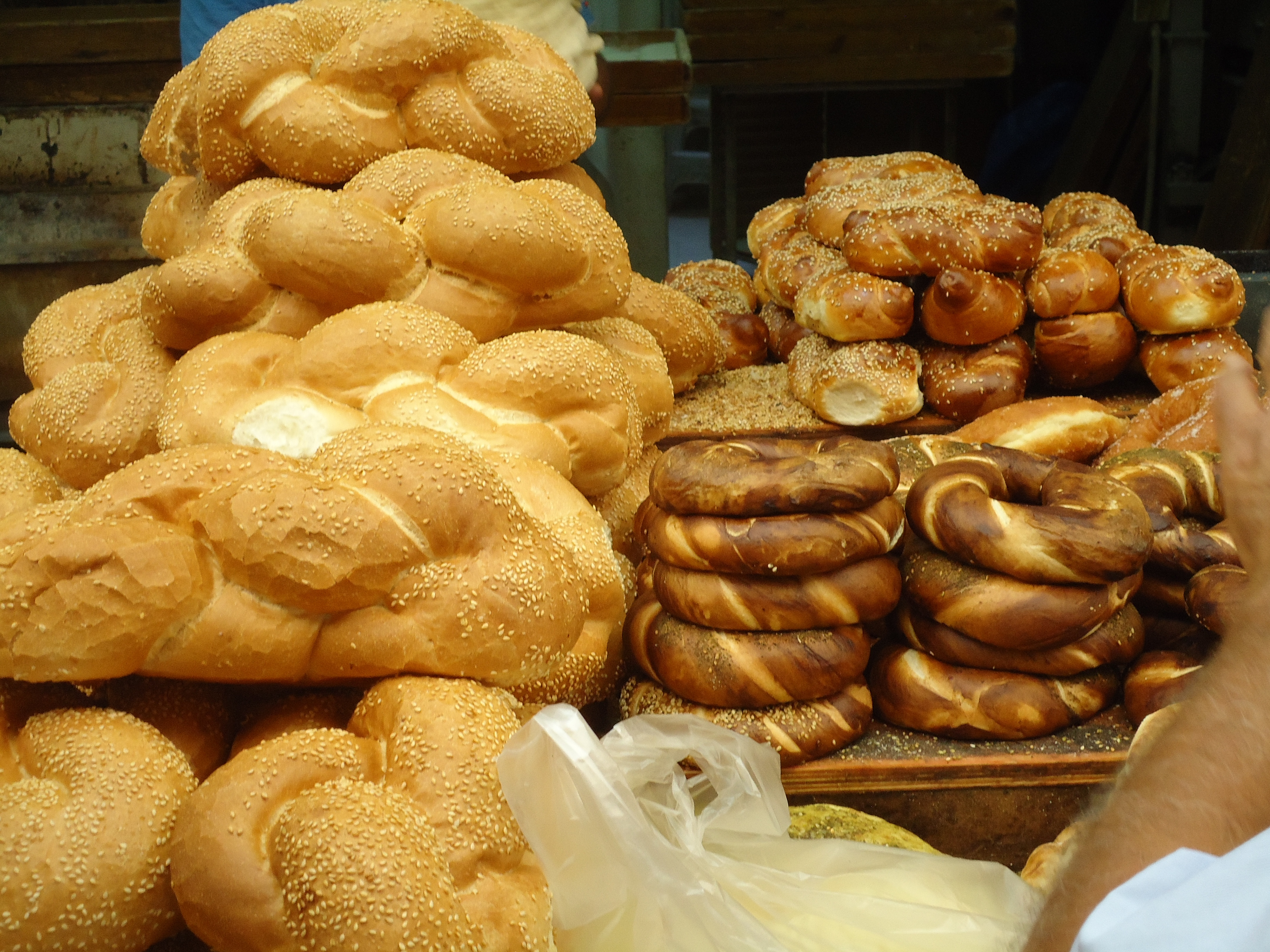
Challah and bagels in Mahane Yehuda Market

- Bagel—a ring of yeasted wheat dough, roughly hand-sized, first boiled for a short time in water and then baked
  - Jerusalem bagel-a yeasted, crusty bread which is shaped into an oblong ring and covered in sesame seeds
- Challah—a special bread of Eastern-European origin in Ashkenazi Jewish cuisine, usually braided
- Kubaneh—traditional Yemenite Jewish bread similar to monkey bread
- Malawach—thin layers of puff pastry brushed with oil or fat and cooked flat in a frying pan
- Matzah—an unleavened flatbread
- Mofletta—a thin crêpe made from water, flour and oil
- Sliced bread—less common today

=== Bread dishes ===
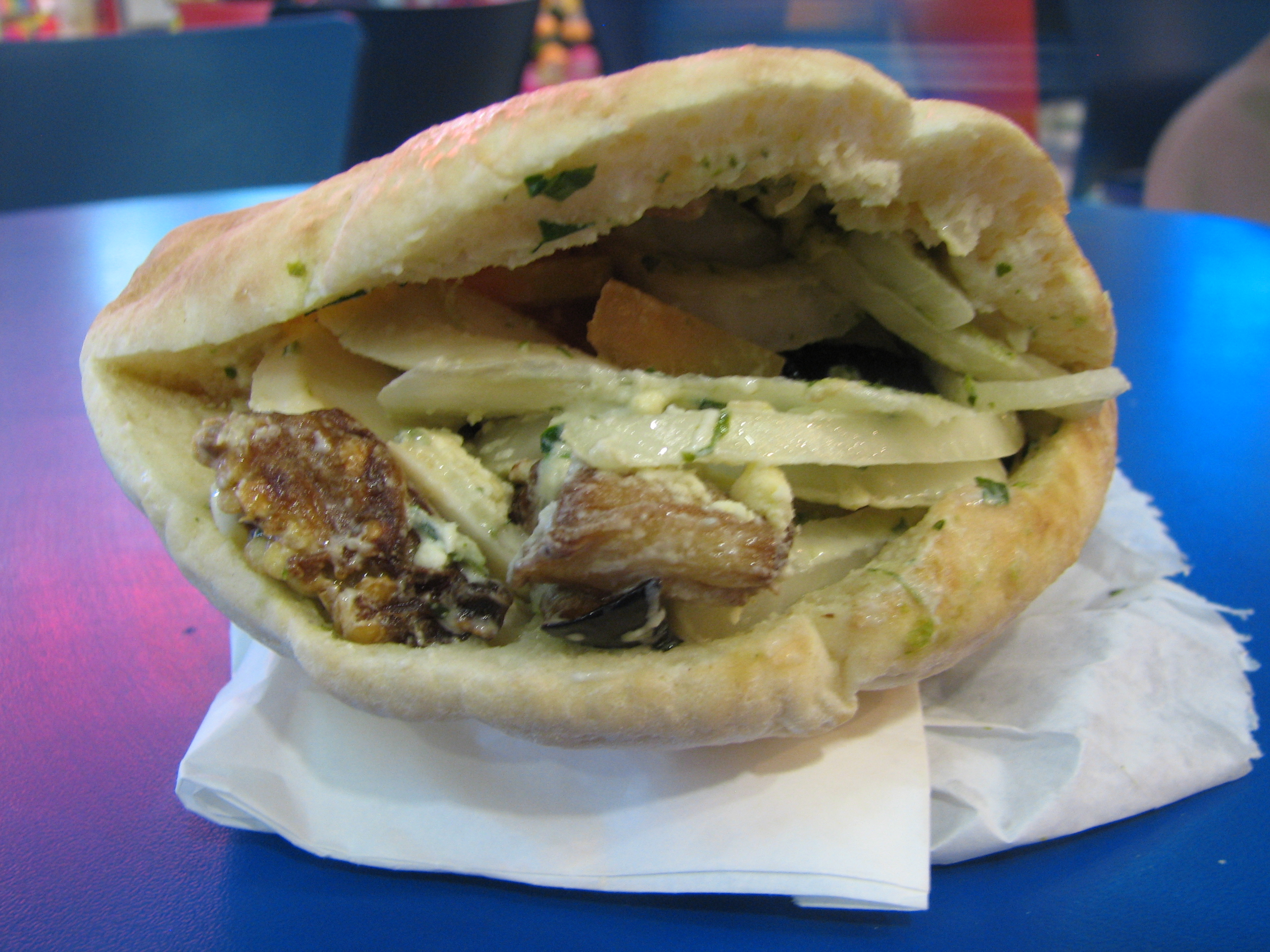
Sabich

- Bagel toast
- Falafel in pita–Israeli pita stuffed with falafel balls and Israeli salad
- Havita b'laffa—omelette in taboon bread, served with hummus or labneh
- Jerusalem mixed grill—can be served in pita or laffa
- Lahmacun—round, thin piece of dough topped with minced meat (most commonly beef and lamb) and minced vegetables and herbs including onions, tomatoes and parsley, then baked
- Sabich—served in pita, traditionally containing fried eggplant, hard-boiled eggs, hummus, tahini, Israeli salad, potato, parsley and amba. Traditionally it is made with haminados eggs. Sometimes it is doused with hot sauce and sprinkled with minced onion

== Snacks ==
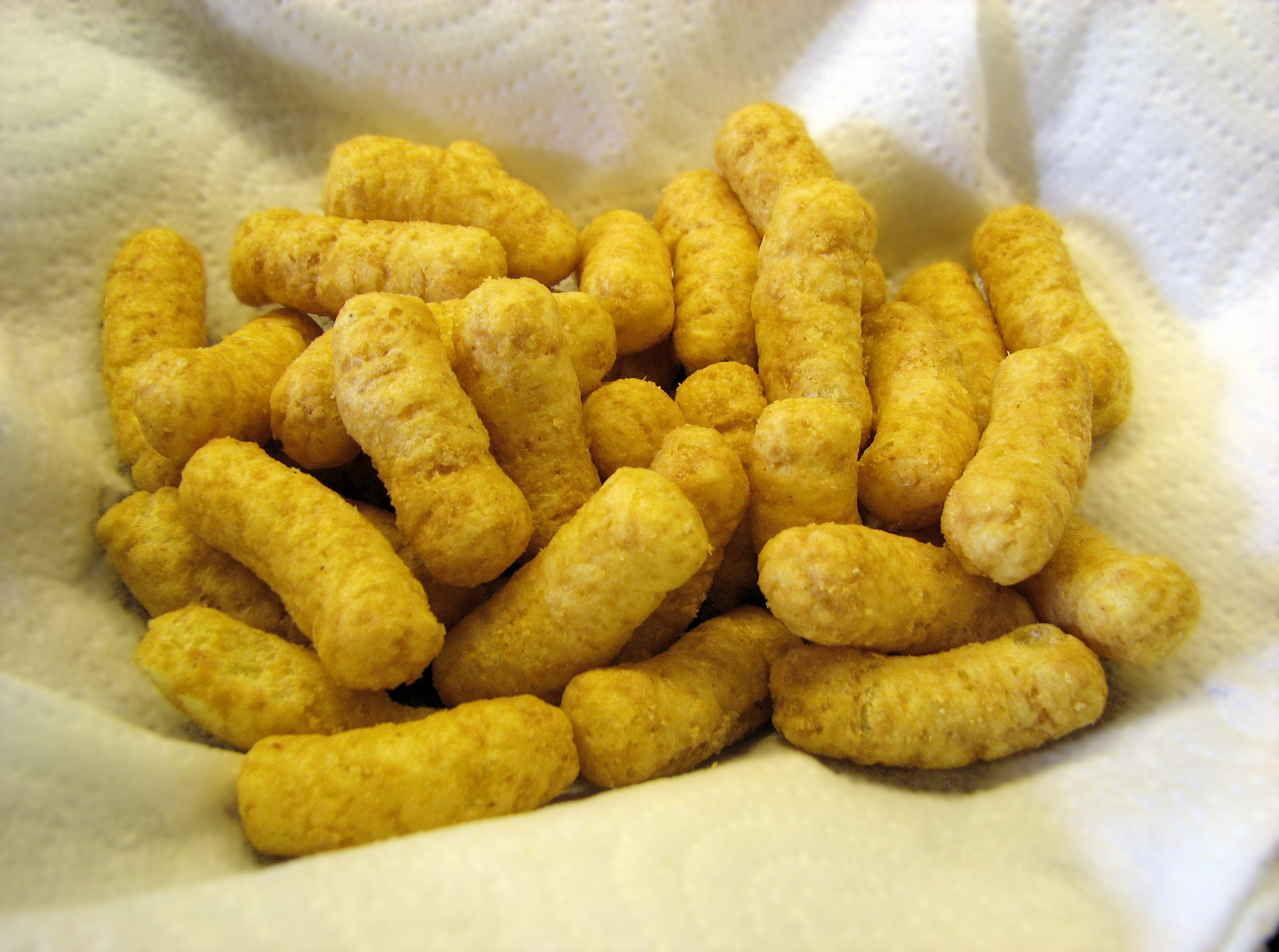
Bamba

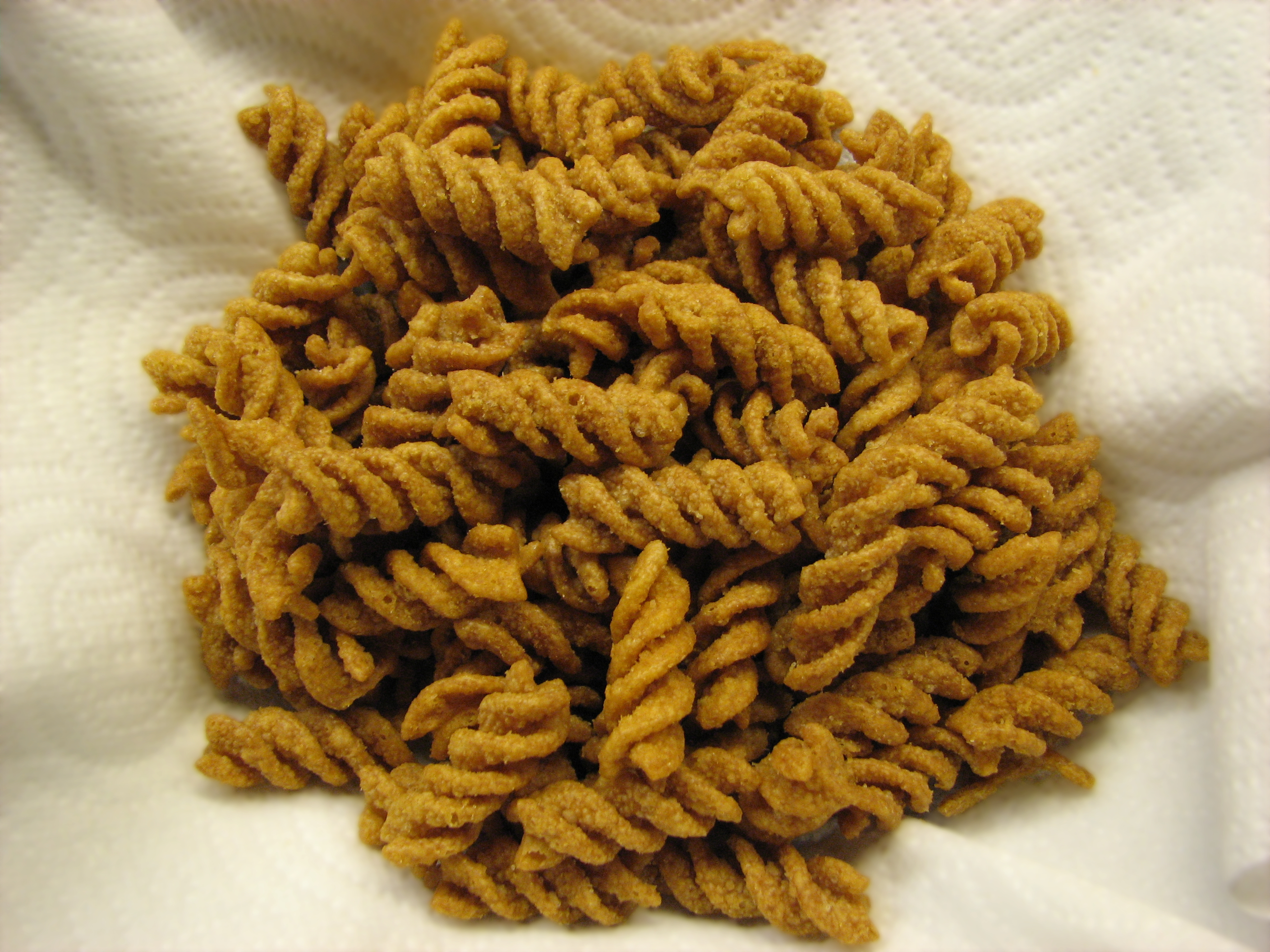
Grill-flavored Bissli

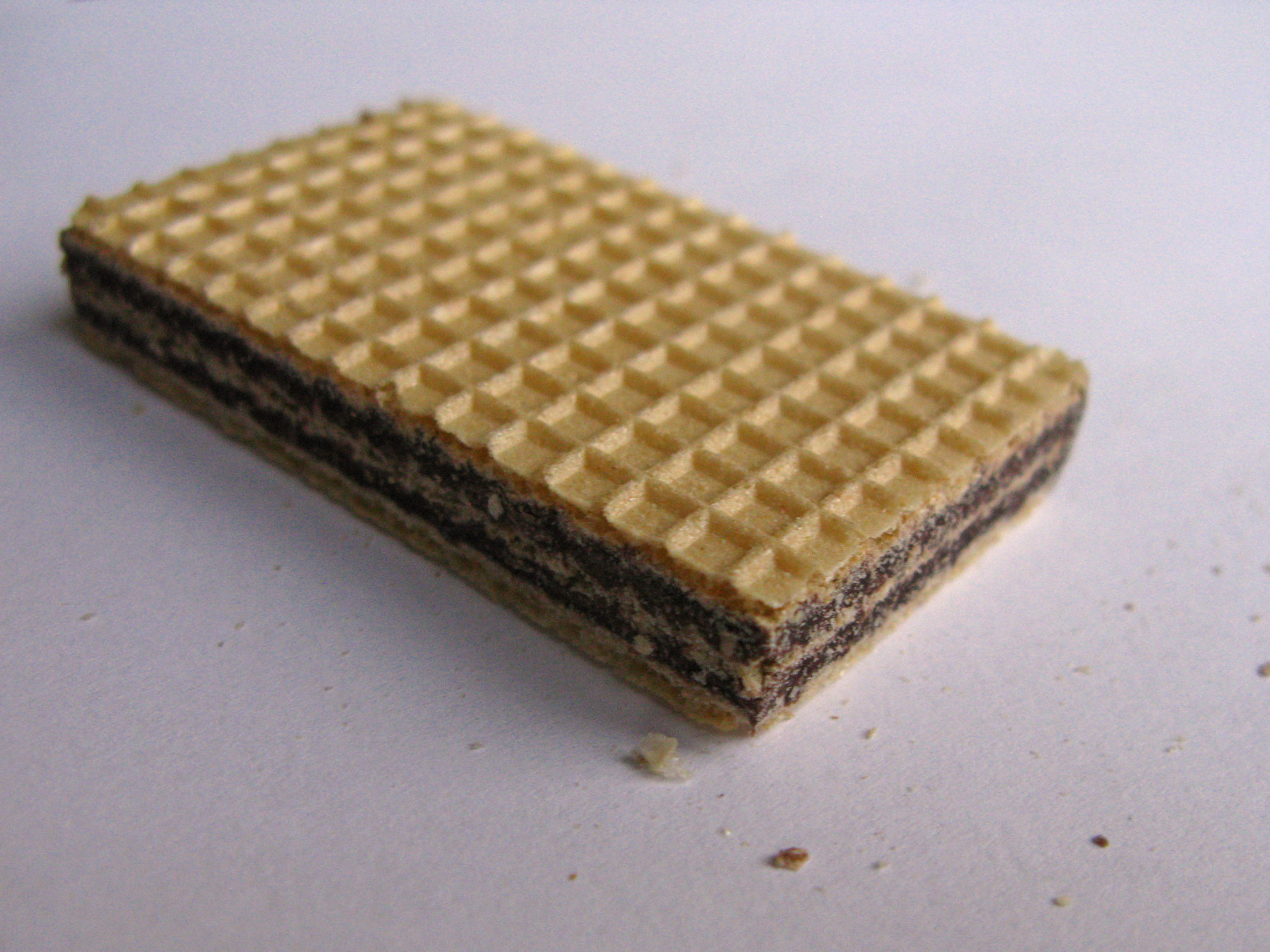
An Israeli wafer

- Bamba—a peanut-butter-flavored snack
- Bissli—popular flavors are "Grill" and "Barbecue", others include onion, smoky, pizza, falafel, Mexican, and hamburger
- Bourekas—a popular baked pastry
- Cow Chocolate—a brand of chocolate products
- Wafer
- Frikandel—a sort of minced-meat hot dog
- Klik—various chocolate, candy, and chocolate-covered products, including chocolate-covered corn flakes and malted milk balls
- Krembo—a chocolate-coated marshmallow treat
- Mekupelet—a bar of thinly folded milk chocolate
- Pannekoek special—pancake or crêpe filled with Nutella chocolate spread and banana
- Pesek Zman—brand of chocolate bar
- Sufganiyah—a round jelly doughnut
- Sfenj—a light, spongy ring of dough fried in oil, eaten plain, sprinkled with sugar, or soaked in honey
- Tortit—a wafer coated with chocolate containing rum-like almond cream

== Sweets and desserts ==
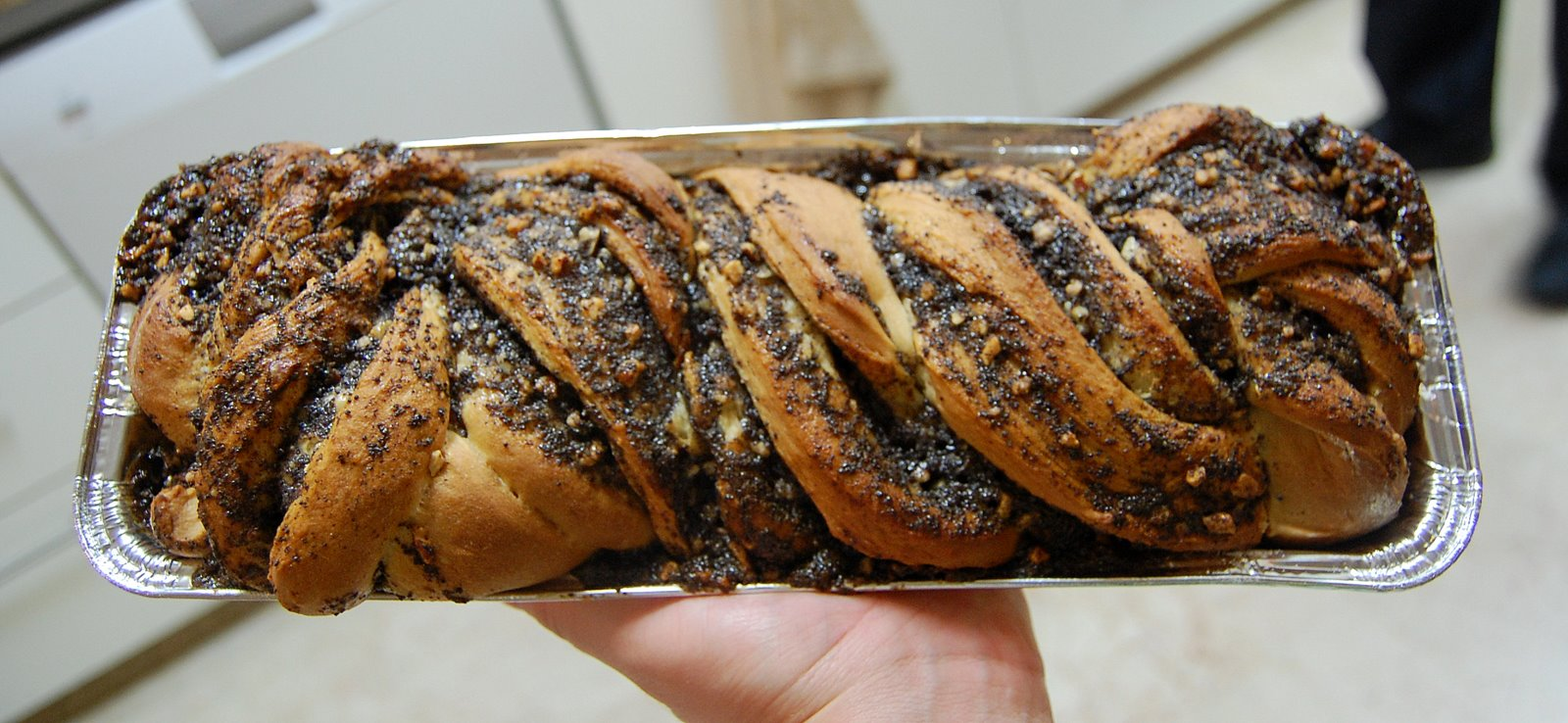
Krantz cake

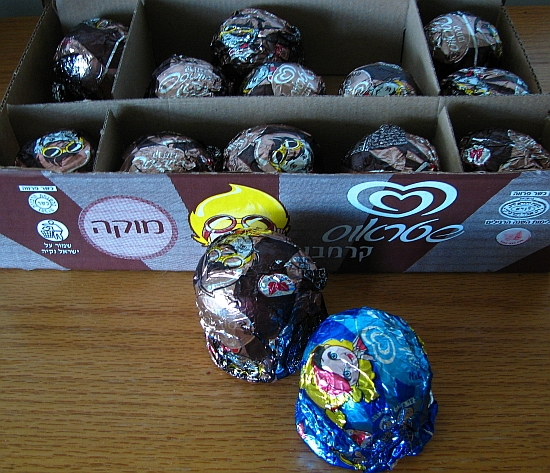
Foiled-wrapped Krembo, mocha and vanilla flavors

- Fazuelos—Sephardic pastries of thin fried dough
- Hamantash—an Ashkenazi triangular filled-pocket cookie
- Ice cream—ice creams, ice pops, and sorbets come in many flavors including halva, hummus, Bamba, arak, watermelon, sirene, labane, and za'atar
- Cheesecake—are very popular in Israel, especially during Shavuot when it is customary to eat dairy foods.
- Crumb cake—is a cake made of yeast dough covered with a sweet crumb.
- Krantz cake—variations include one filled with chocolate and raspberry jam, another soaked in honey syrup
- Kugel—a baked pudding or casserole, most commonly made from egg noodles
- Lahoh—a spongy, pancake-like bread originating from Somalia and the Horn of Africa
- Lekach—a honey-sweetened cake
- Levivot—Hanukah latkes (potato pancakes)
- Rugelach—a triangle of dough around a filling
- Duvshaniot— is a popular Israeli cookie made with honey and spices that is traditionally made to celebrate Rosh Hashanah and the High Holidays.
- Silan—date honey
- Watermelon with sirene or safed cheese, and sometimes mint leaves

== Beverages ==
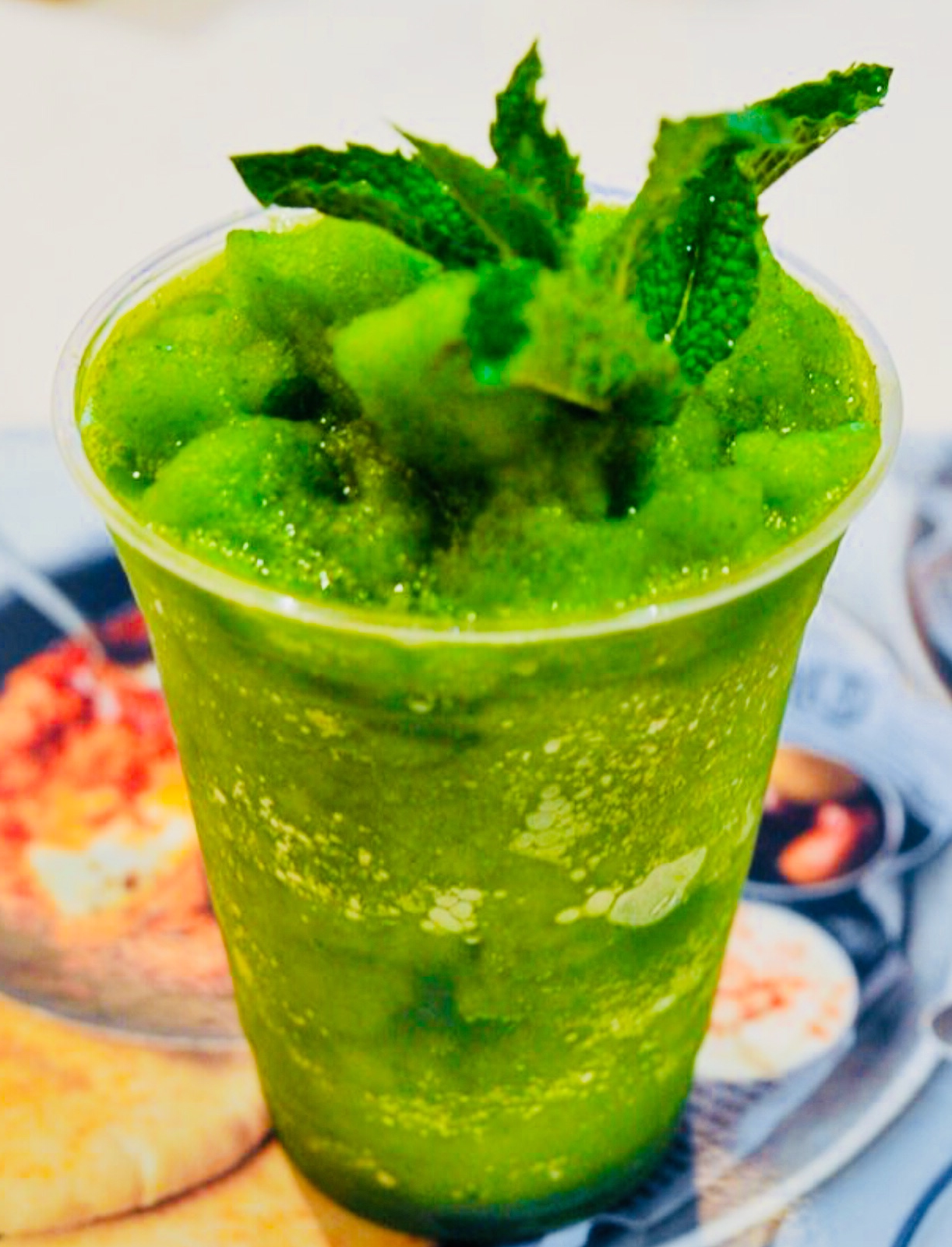
Limonana

- Apricot juice
- Arak—Anise-flavored alcoholic beverage, sometimes flavored with grapefruit or khat juices instead of water
- Beer
- Gat—A juice made of khat, in Jerusalem it is mixed with citron and named Etrogat
- Limonana—type of lemonade made from freshly-squeezed lemon juice and mint leaves
- Orange juice
- Pomegranate juice
- Pomegranate wine
- Shoko Bsakit—chocolate milk in a bag
- Sugarcane juice
- Tea—sometimes flavored with rosewater, mint, lemon juice, honey or date honey
- Turkish coffee
- Vodka—distilled beverage composed primarily of water and ethanol, sometimes with traces of impurities and flavorings
- Wine

== See also ==
- Israeli cuisine
- Kosher restaurant
- Middle Eastern cuisine
- Strauss-Elite
- Osem (company)
