= Unilever Israel =

Israeli branch of Unilever

- Native name: יוניליוור ישראל
- Type: Subsidiary
- Industry: Food; body care
- Founded: 1948; 78 years ago
- Headquarters: Lod, Israel
- Key people: Arnon Shapira (CEO)
- Products: Cereals, sauces and condiments, chocolate products, ice creams, salty and sweet snacks, body care products, and beverages.
- Number of employees: 2,000 (2024)
- Parent: Unilever
- Website: unilever.co.il

Unilever Israel (Hebrew: יוניליוור ישראל) is an Israeli subsidiary of the British multinational company Unilever. As of 2022, it is the sixth-largest consumer goods company in Israel. The company markets a wide variety of products, approximately 85% of which are locally produced. The product range includes both international and local brands, spanning the fields of food, body care, and home care.

The company employs around 2,000 people across four production sites, distribution centers, and marketing and sales systems spread throughout Israel. Its headquarters are located in Airport City. As of 2024, Arnon Shapira is the CEO of Unilever Israel.

The company production sites are in the cities of:

- Safed: The factory in the city produces chocolate, bagels, and sweet snacks (including Klik, Vered Hagalil, and Bagel Bagel).
- Acre: The factory in the city produces ice cream and Krembo (Strauss Ice Cream).
- Arad: The factory in the city produces cereals (including Telma, Kifli, and Fitness cereals).
- Haifa: The factory in the city produces soups and seasoning powders, spreads, sauces (including Knorr, Telma, Hellmann's, and 778), as well as care and cleaning products (including Pinuk, Badin, and Cif).

== History ==
=== Initial companies (TAMI, Vitco) ===
Unilever began operating in the Land of Israel for the first time in 1938 in the field of food. The company established the Blue Band margarine factory in Haifa, in collaboration with Dr. Arnold Hildesheimer. In 1939, the company changed its name from Blue Band to "TAMI - Eretz Israel Food Products." (Today "Telma")

Due to the Arab League boycott of Israel, TAMI avoided mentioning the name of the parent company. But due to further Arab pressure, the company transferred ownership of the factory to the Rothschild & Co in London (RAS).

In 1992, CPC International purchased 51% of TAMI shares, and later completed the purchase of the remaining shares, renaming TAMI to "TAMI Bestfoods". Unilever's first venture into Israel's personal care market occurred in 1996, when it acquired the Israeli company "Vitco" (ויטקו) and renamed it "Lever" (ליוור).

=== Merge into "Unilever Israel" ===
The merger of the two sectors (food and personal care) was completed in 2002 when Unilever acquired control of the American food companies Hellmann's and Best Foods. Following this acquisition, Unilever consolidated the operations of TAMI Bestfoods and Lever in Israel, renaming the entity "Unilever Israel".

In 1996, Unilever entered into a partnership with Strauss Group in the ice cream business. In 2010, Unilever made two significant acquisitions: it gained full ownership of "Bagel Bagel" and increased its stake in "Strauss Ice Cream" to 90%. In early 2014, Unilever purchased the remaining shares of Strauss Ice Cream, acquiring 100% ownership of the company.

=== The salmonella crisis (2016) ===
In July 2016, there was a shortage of the company's breakfast cereals at points of sale. Initially, the company denied any quality issues, officially announcing that "all the company's products, including Thelma's breakfast cereals, are normal and safe to use." However, after two days, the company admitted that salmonella contamination had been detected. It was later revealed that the company had been unaware of the problem for a month and had failed to report it to the Israeli Ministry of Health. The company's lack of transparency led to contaminated products reaching consumers' homes. Consequently, the Authority for Consumer Protection and Fair Trade fined Unilever Israel 594,000 NIS for violating the Israeli Consumer Protection Law.

=== The salmonella crisis (2022) ===
As part of the salmonella case in dairies in Israel, the company announced the recall of some Strauss ice cream products, although, according to the company, no contamination was found in them during its tests.

== Brands ==
=== Food brands ===
- Telma (Hebrew: תלמה) - food brand, since 1947
- Strauss Ice cream (Hebrew: גלידת שטראוס) - ice cream brand, since 1996
- Bagel Bagel (Hebrew: בייגל בייגל) - bagel brand, since 1880
- Vered Hagalil (Hebrew: ורד הגליל) - chocolate brand, since 1986
- Klik (Hebrew: קליק) - candy brand, since 1986
- Knorr (Hebrew: קנור) - food brand, since 1838
- Lipton (Hebrew: ליפטון) - tea brand, since the 19th century, Scotland
- Patit (Hebrew: פתית) - cracker brand, was under the control of TMI
- Hellmann's and Best Foods (Hebrew: הלמנ'ס) - food brand
- 778 - jam brand, since the 50's
- Afical (Hebrew: אפיכל) - brand of baking tools

=== Body care brands ===
- Pinuk (Hebrew: פינוק, lit. 'pamper')
- Dove (Hebrew: דאב)
- Badin (Hebrew: בדין)
- AXE (Hebrew: אקס)
- Vaseline (Hebrew: וזלין)
- Cif (Hebrew: סיף)
