= Rugula =

Rugula may refer to:

- Arugula, an edible plant Eruca sativa
- Rugelach, a Jewish pastry
