= Tortit =

Chocolate bar from Israel

- An Elite brand Tortit candy bar.
- Alternative names: Hebrew: טורטית
- Course: Snack
- Place of origin: Israel
- Created by: Elite
- Main ingredients: Chocolate, wafer

Tortit (Hebrew: טורטית) is a popular Israeli chocolate bar produced by the Elite Confectionery Company in the confectionery division located in Nazareth Illit, Israel. The snack is made of a wafer coated with chocolate and contains rum-like almond cream. The bar is sold in a 40 gram green package. The snack is kosher and parve (made on a dairy production line that has been prepared for parve). Its popularity in Israel is explained by the fact that, being parve, it can also be eaten as a dessert after a meat meal, and since it has no milk or eggs it is vegan. Tortit bears similarity in taste and packing to the Polish Grześki.

As of 2017 the Tortit brand held a 6.7% of the Israeli candy bar market, second to Taami with 9.4%.

== History ==
The product was launched by Elite in 1975. At that time, milk chocolate was marketed with a rum flavored cream under the brand name "Jamaica". In the same cream, the coated waffle is also used. The name of the snack is called Tortit because it resembles a torte cake in its structure.

In 2017, Marwan Barghouti a Palestinian leader serving five life sentences for murder and other terrorism offenses in an Israeli jail was filmed surreptitiously eating a Tortit bar while on a declared hunger strike. The Israeli Pizza Hut subsidiary ran an ad posing the question "Barghouti: If you’re going to break the strike, isn’t pizza better?", however Strauss (the owner of the Elite brand) decided not to use for the incident for advertising. While several media outlets claimed the incidents led to an increase in Tortit Sales, a Strauss spokesperson denied this was the case.

== See also ==
- Klik (candy)
- Pesek Zman
- Mekupelet
