= Laffa =

Iraqi flatbread

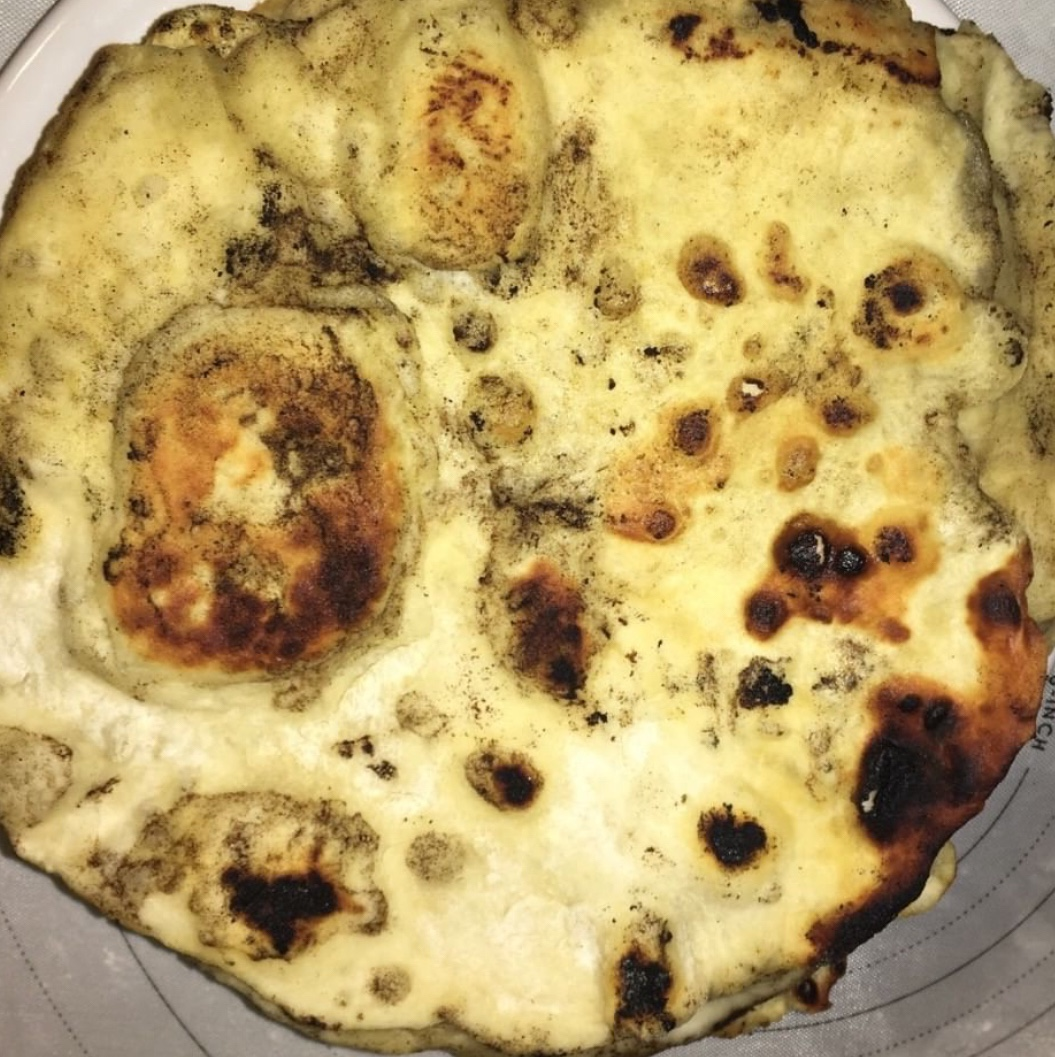
- Laffa grilled over coals
- Alternative names: Lafa, lapha, Iraqi pita
- Type: Flatbread
- Place of origin: Iraq
- Main ingredients: Flour, water, yeast, olive oil, kosher salt

Laffa, also known as lafa or Iraqi pita, is the Modern Hebrew term for a large, thin flatbread with an Iraqi origin. Laffa is a simple bread that is traditionally vegan and cooked in a tannur or tabun, both of which are clay ovens. It is most often used to wrap falafel, kebab, and shawarma to make sandwiches, to dip in hummus, matbucha and other dips, or with shakshouka, and other dishes. It is also the traditional bread used in sabich, an Israeli eggplant sandwich.

Laffa is similar to many tandoor breads found in Asia, including naan and pita. Though they are similar, laffa is unique in that it does not form a pocket and is much thicker and chewier than pita or naan.

== History ==
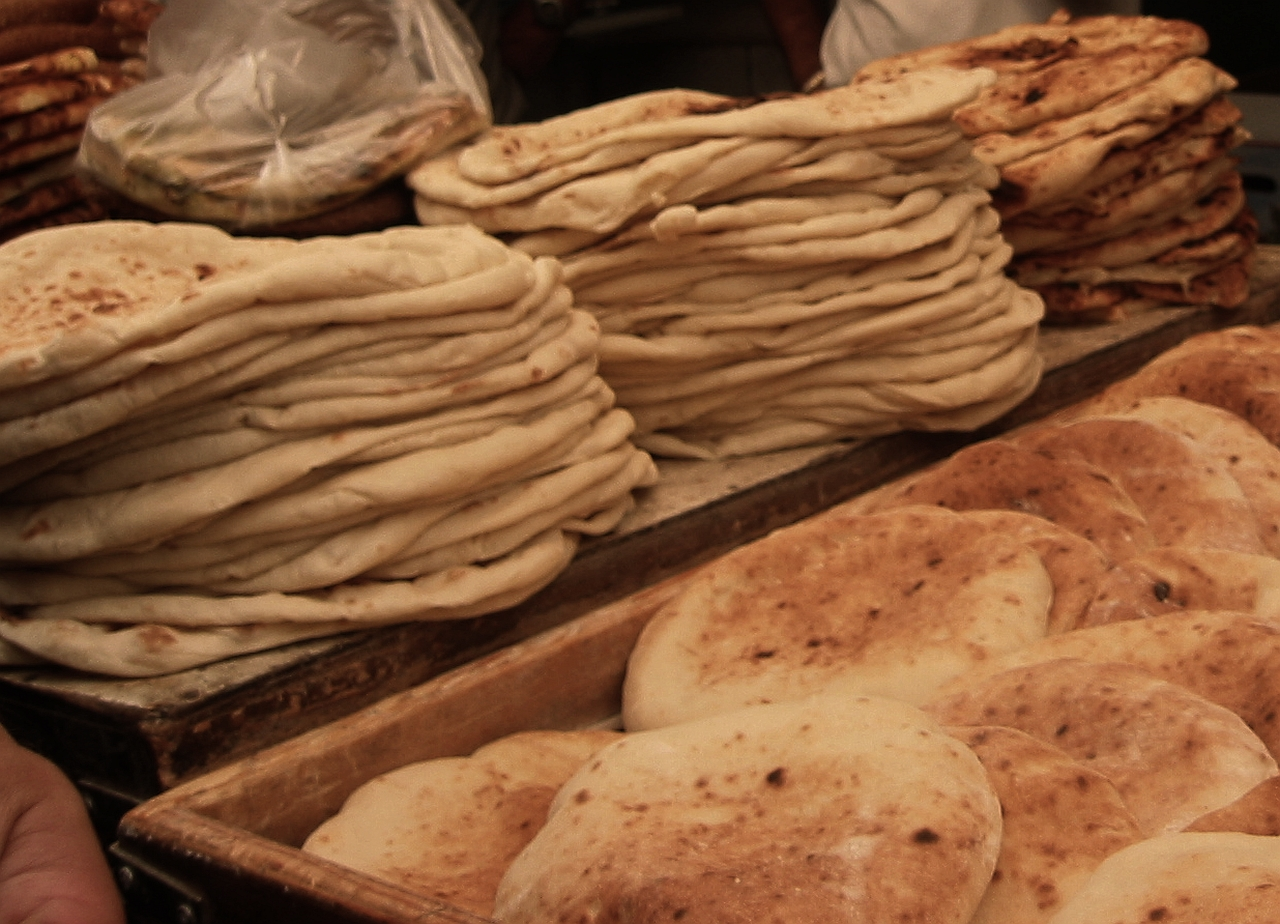
Laffas for sale at the Mahane Yehuda Market in Jerusalem

Laffa is known as Iraqi pita, given its origin in Iraq. Members of the Jewish community of Iraq, almost all of whom came to Israel via Operation Ezra and Nehemiah in the mid-20th century, brought with them the standard Iraqi flatbread known in Baghdad Jewish Arabic as ʿēsh tannūr, ḫobz al-tannūr, or simply khubz "bread". Laffa was traditionally baked in communal outdoor wood or coal-fired ovens and served as an accompaniment to myriad dishes.

== Etymology ==
The word laffa (Mesopotamian Arabic: لفة) is of Arabic origin, meaning "wrap" or "roll".

== Preparation ==
Laffa is prepared by creating a dough typically made up of flour, water, yeast, salt, sugar, and olive oil and combined over a long fermentation process. The dough is kneaded and then often left to rise for several hours or overnight. It is then divided into several balls of dough, which are then left to rise again. Afterwards, the dough is then rolled out into a large, thin piece, much thinner than a pita, and cooked for several minutes until it has risen slightly and cooked through. For the cooking process, laffa was traditionally baked in a wood- or coal-fired oven, similar to a tandoor. In modern times a pizza oven, outdoor grill, stovetop, frying pan, or oven is more often used. After baking, laffa is often finished with olive oil and za'atar.

While laffa and pita are similar in appearance, different leavening processes creates significantly different outcomes. Pita only undergoes moderate leavening, while laffa can be fermented days on end. This leads pita to have a thinner and crispier texture while laffa is much thicker and chewier.

== Culinary use ==
Laffa's simplicity makes it an ideal pairing for various dishes. In particular, its durable texture makes it suitable for dipping, and it is frequently paired with dips such as hummus and other mezes. It is the traditional bread used in sabich and is also commonly used to wrap sandwiches such as falafel, shawarma, ground meat kebabs, and others.

Laffa has distinct regional variations. In Iraq, any sandwich or wrap made with this bread is called a laffa. The name refers to the bread it is wrapped in. In Israel, laffa is often used as a general term. For instance, Israelis may refer to both taboon bread and the thinner saj bread as "laffa".

== See also ==
- Falafel
- Markook shrek
- Saj bread (also known as yufka)
