= Krembo =

Chocolate covered marshmallow snack

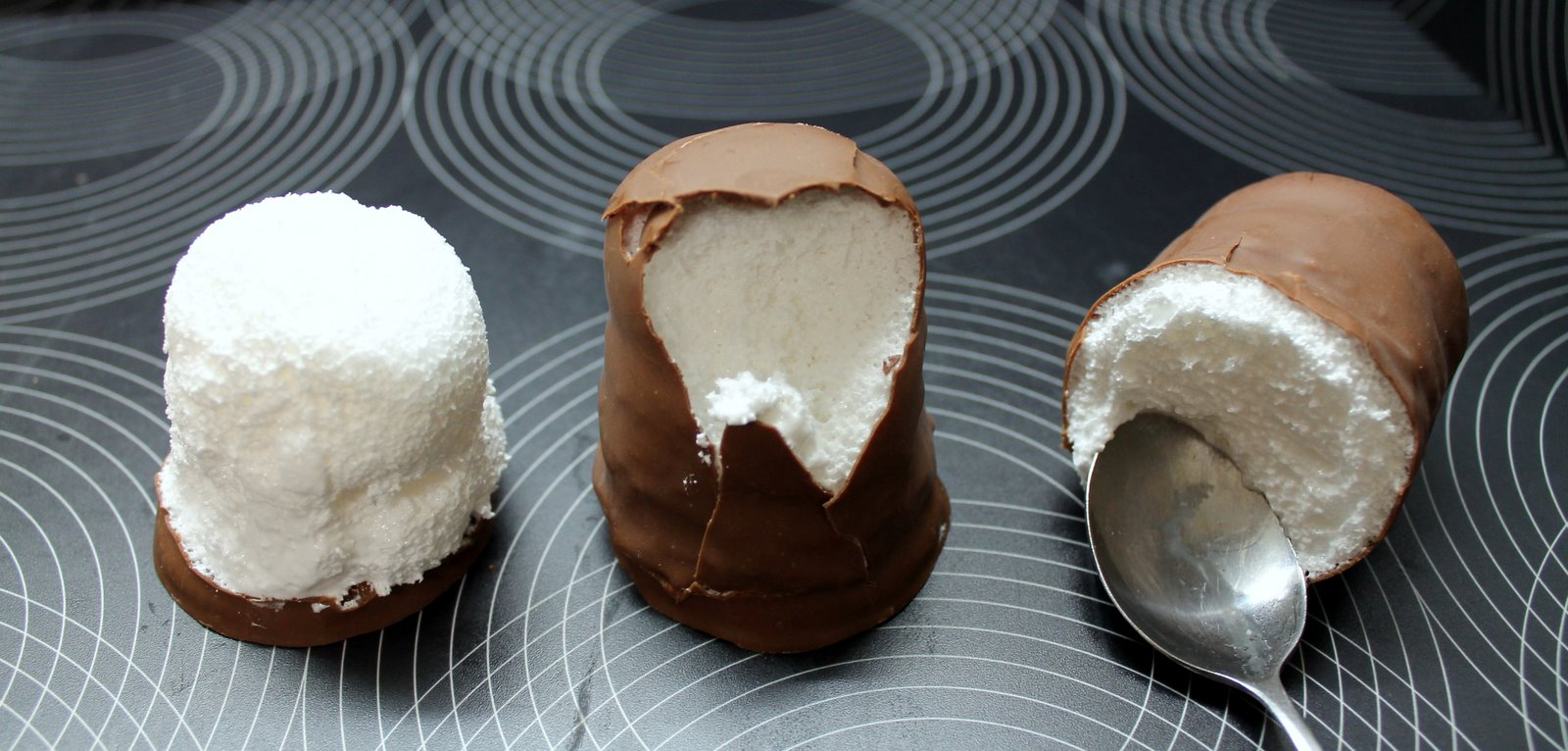
- Marshmallow cream-filled Krembo
- Course: Snack
- Place of origin: Denmark
- Created by: Strauss
- Main ingredients: Chocolate, filling such as marshmallow cream, marzipan or buttercream, biscuit or cookie similar to shortbread
- Variations: white chocolate, dark chocolate, halva, nougat, meringue, marzipan, buttercream
- Food energy (per 25 g serving): 115 kcal (480 kJ)

Krembo, also called crembo or creambo (a contraction meaning literally "Cream-in-it" in Hebrew (קרמבו)), is a chocolate-coated marshmallow treat that is popular in Israel. "Krembo whipped snack" consists of a round biscuit base (17% of total weight), topped with fluffy marshmallow creme-like foam (53%), coated in a thin layer of cemacao (dairy-free, sweet baking chocolate, about 30% of total) and wrapped in colourful, thin aluminum foil.

== History ==
The confection originated in Denmark. Ashkenazi Jews fleeing persecution in Europe during the Second Aliyah to Ottoman Palestine brought with them their traditional foods and confections, including the predecessor to the krembo. Chocolate-coated marshmallow treats were popular as homemade sweets among the Ashkenazi in the early 20th century. The first manufacturer, the Whitman Company, coined the name Krembo. In Hebrew, the word krembo is a combination of krem (cream) and bo (in it). A mocha flavour was introduced in 1967. In 1979 Whitman was acquired by Strauss which has the major part of the krembo market in Israel. During the 1980s and 1990s smaller manufacturers introduced additional flavours such as banana and strawberry but failed to achieve a significant market share.

In 2005, Strauss signed an agreement with Unilever to export ice cream and krembos to the United States and Canada due to a demand for products of this type with strict kosher certification. Under terms of the agreement, they may be sold only in kosher supermarkets and import shops. The distributor in North America is Dairy Delight, a subsidiary of Norman's Dairy. In 2007, Nestlé introduced an ice cream variation of krembo called Lekbo (Hebrew: לקבו, lit. 'lick inside').

== Overview ==
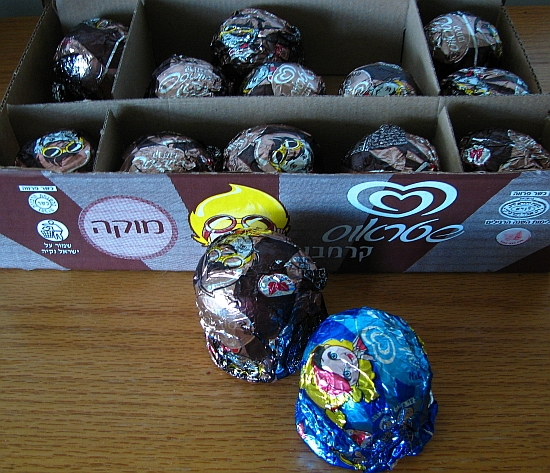
Foiled-wrapped Krembo, mocha and vanilla flavors

Due to Israel's Mediterranean climate, with long, warm summers, krembos are a seasonal treat sold only four months a year, from October to February. They are not sold during the rest of the year due to their fragility and as they are prone to melting when exposed to heat. Krembos are the most popular confection in Israel, with over 50 million krembos sold each year—an average of 9 per person.

== Nutritional information ==
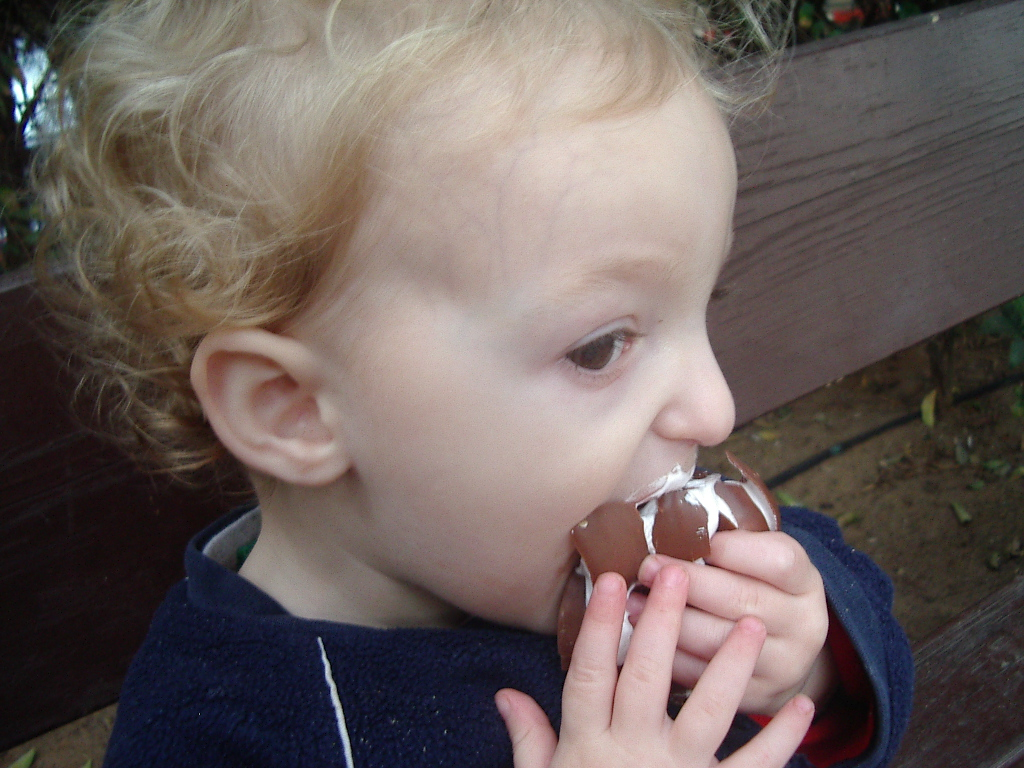
Boy eating Krembo

The average krembo weighs 25 grams (0.882 ounces) and has 115 calories. According to the fine print on packing foil, per 100 gr of krembo there are 419 calories, 3.2 gr protein, 64 gr carbohydrates (of which 54 gr are sugars); 16.7% Fats (of which 13.9% are poly-saturated fatty acids, less than 0.5% are trans fatty acids) and 67 mg Sodium.

== Halachic rules ==
Under kashrut, the dietary rules of Jewish law (Halacha), some Orthodox rabbis find significance to the order in which one eats a Krembo. Both the biscuit and the chocolate have to be blessed and one need pronounce only the blessing over the main components, thus for a chocolate croissant one would say the blessing over the dough, and skip the blessing over the chocolate. But in the case of the Krembo, there is no consensus as to which is the "main" component: the biscuit, or the cream and chocolate. One solution is to bless over each component separately.

== In popular culture ==
In the Hebrew version of Harry Potter and the Philosopher's Stone, translator Gili Bar-Hillel translated Dumbledore's favourite sweet as a Krembo, instead of a sherbet lemon.

Although considered a children's treat, sociologists have found that it is consumed as a comfort food by Israeli expatriates in the United States, evoking nostalgia for their childhood.

== See also ==
- Klik
- Chanukah gelt
- Chocolate-coated marshmallow treats
