= Krantz cake =

Ashkenazi Jewish cake

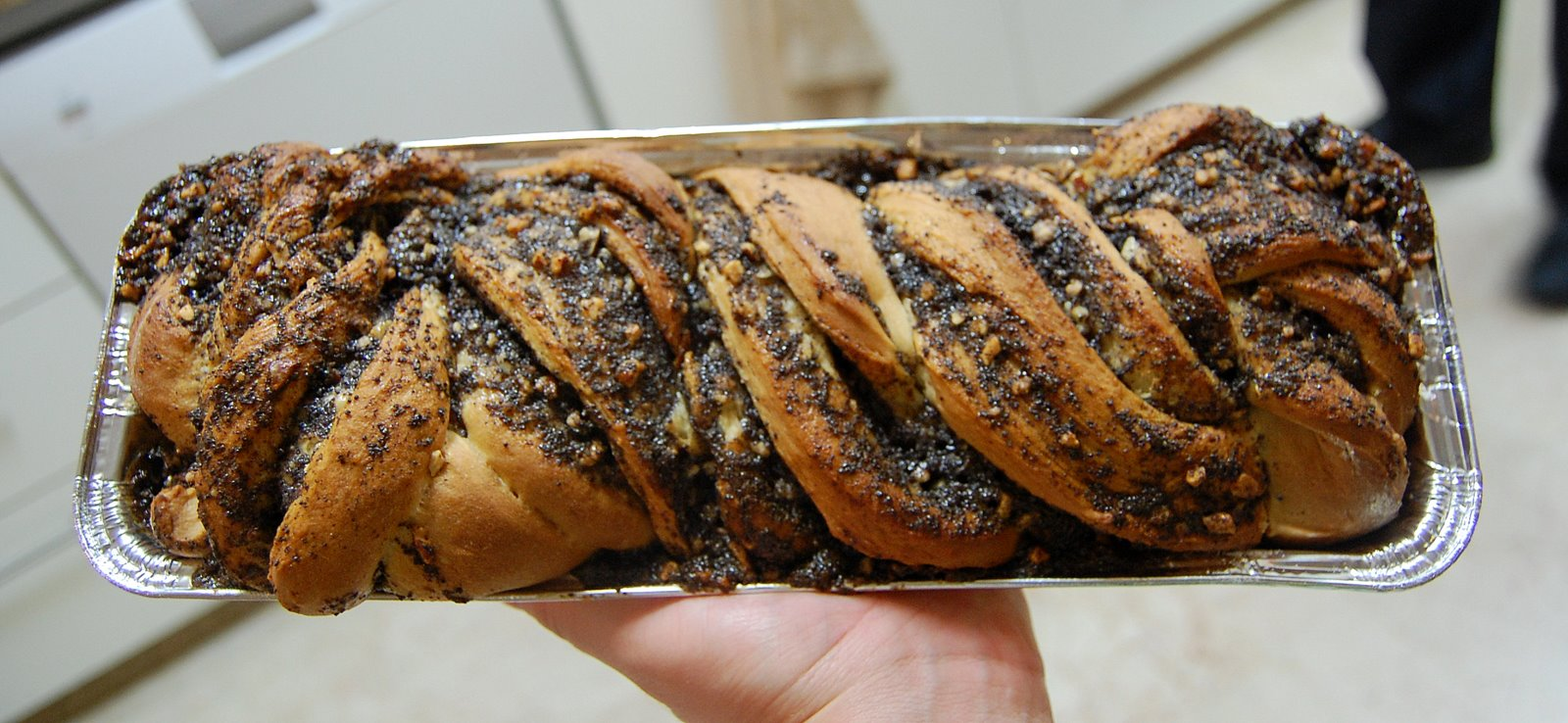
Krantz cake

Krantz cake (Hebrew: עוגת קראנץ) is an Ashkenazi Jewish cake prepared using yeast-risen dough. It has been described as the "most popular cake in the west side of Jerusalem," and as potentially being the most popular cake in all of Israel.

== See also ==
- Babka (cake)
- List of cakes
- List of Israeli dishes
