= Rugelach =

Pastry in Ashkenazi Jewish cuisine

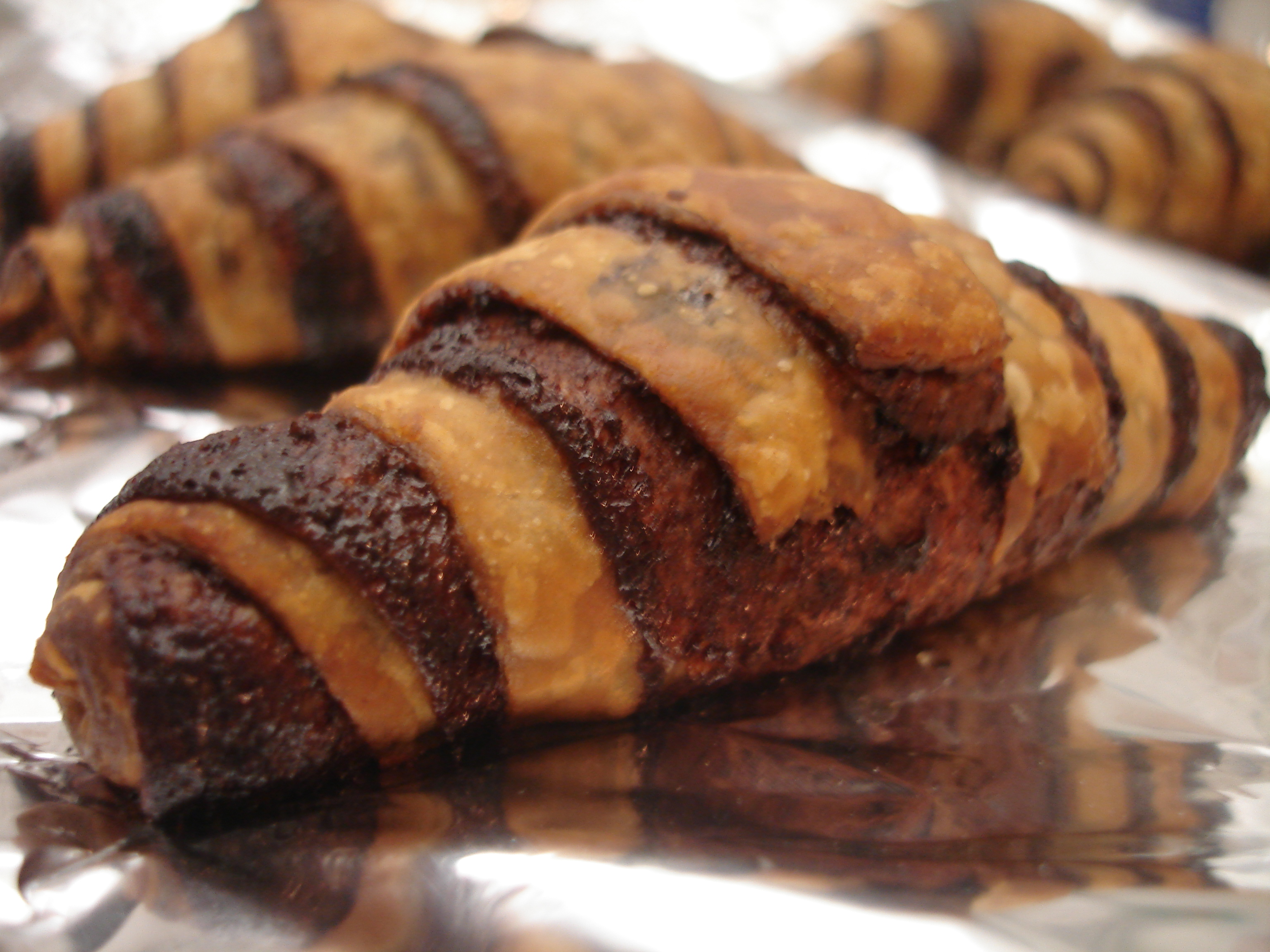
- Chocolate rugelach
- Type: Pastry
- Place of origin: Jewish communities of Poland
- Region or state: Central Europe and Israel
- Associated cuisine: Jewish cuisine
- Created by: Ashkenazi Jews
- Main ingredients: Dough: sour cream or cream cheese Filling: any of raisins, walnuts, cinnamon, chocolate, marzipan, poppy seed, or fruit preserves

Rugelach (/ˈruːɡələx/ ROO-gəl-əkh; Polish: rogaliki, Yiddish: ראָגאַל, romanized: rogal, or Yiddish: ראָגאַלעך, romanized: rogalekh; Hebrew: רוגלך rōgalaḵ) is a pastry-like dough-based baked sweet food which originated in the Jewish communities of Poland some time during the Early Modern era, with the first published recipes in the early 19th century. It has become a popular food among Jewish people all over the world, including Israel.

Traditional rugelach are shaped into a crescent by rolling a triangle of dough around a thin layer of filling. Some sources state that the rugelach and the French croissant share a common Viennese ancestor, crescent-shaped pastries commemorating the lifting of the Turkish siege, possibly a reference to the Battle of Vienna in 1683. This appears to be an urban legend, however, as The rugelach's supposed ancestor, the less-sweet Kipferl, predate the Early Modern era, and The rugelach predates the croissant (which, in its modern form, did not originate earlier than the 19th century (see viennoiserie)). This leads many to believe that the croissant is simply a descendant of one of these two.

An alternative form is constructed much like a strudel or nut roll, but unlike those, the rolled dough and filling are cut into slices before baking.

== Etymology ==
The Yiddish word rugelach comes from the Polish rogaliki. In Polish, róg means "corner" or "horn" – both the kind on an animal and the musical instrument. Croissant-shaped pastries, which look like horns, are called rogale in Polish, see rogal świętomarciński. Rogale is almost identical in pronunciation and meaning to the Yiddish word rugelach. The -ach ending (־ך) indicates the plural in Yiddish.

== Ingredients ==
Rugelach can be made with sour cream or cream cheese doughs, but there are also pareve variants (with no dairy ingredients), so that it can be eaten with or after a meat meal and still be kosher. Cream cheese doughs are the most recent, while yeast leavened and sour cream doughs are much older.

The different fillings can include raisins, walnuts, cinnamon, chocolate, marzipan, poppy seed, or fruit preserves which are rolled up inside. Vanilla-filled rugelach have become popular in New York in recent decades.

In recent years, chefs have introduced savory versions of these pastries, filled with chicken and schmaltz or salmon and boursin cheese.

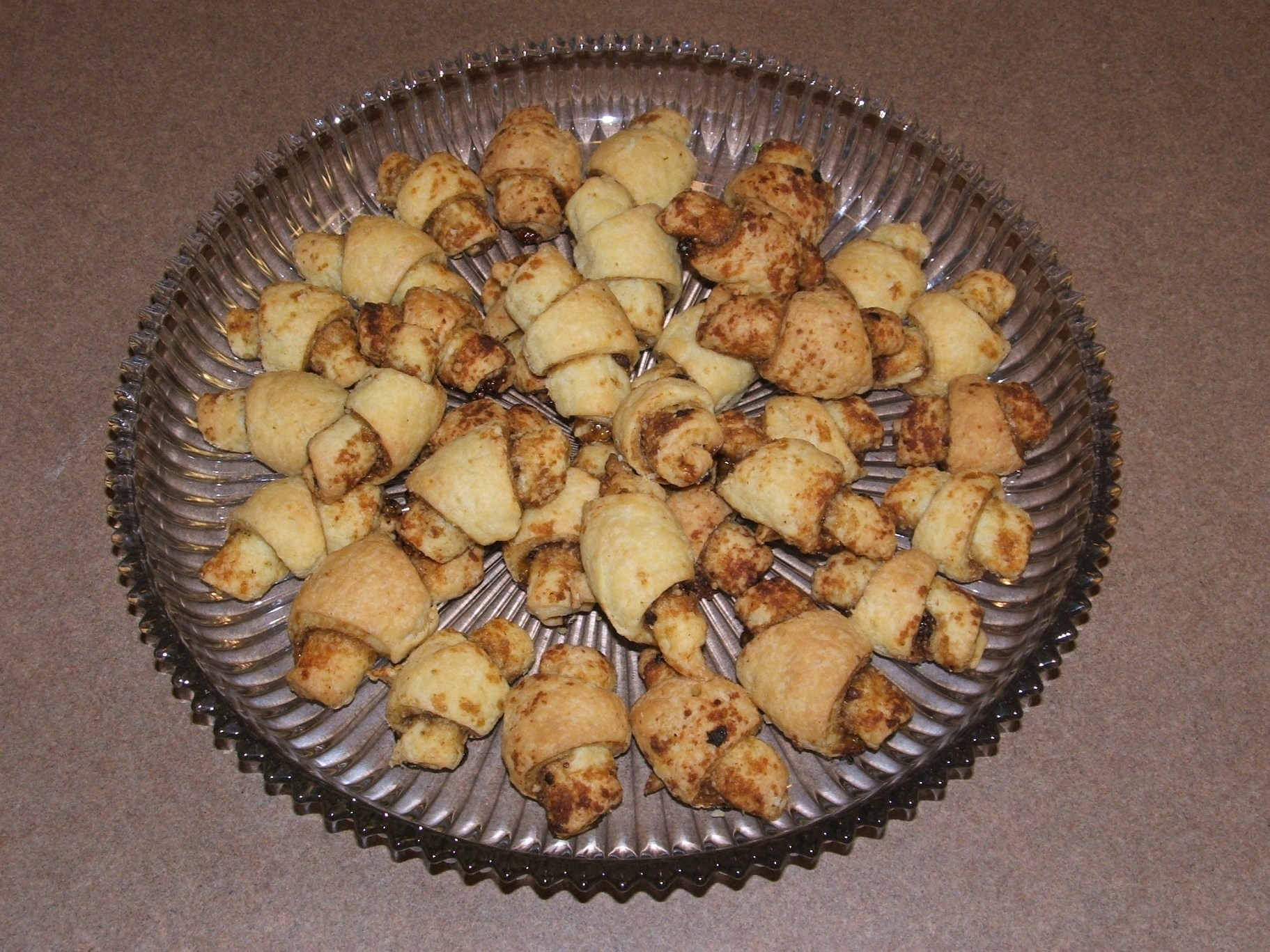
Crescent-shaped rugelach

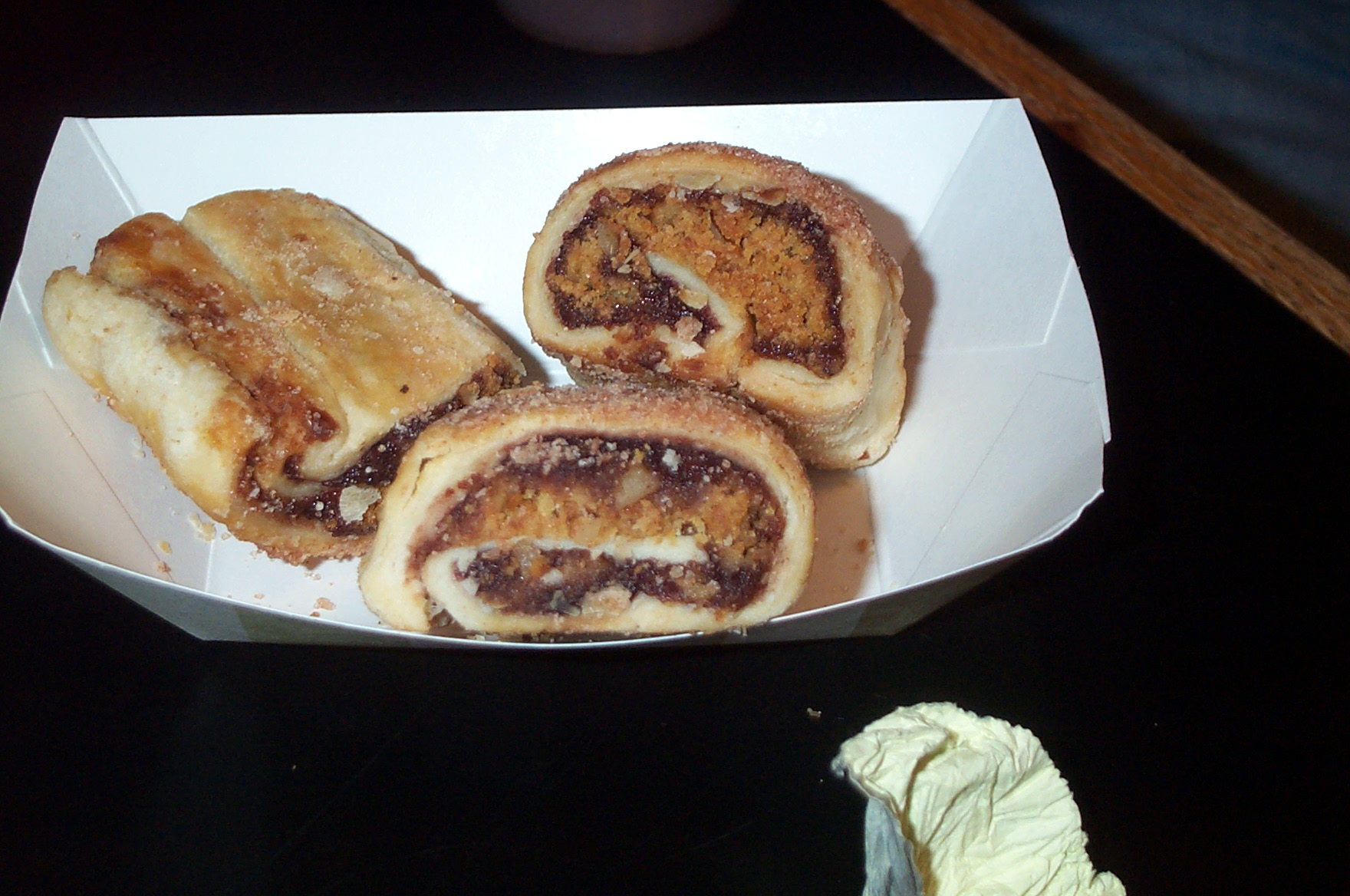
Cut rugelach

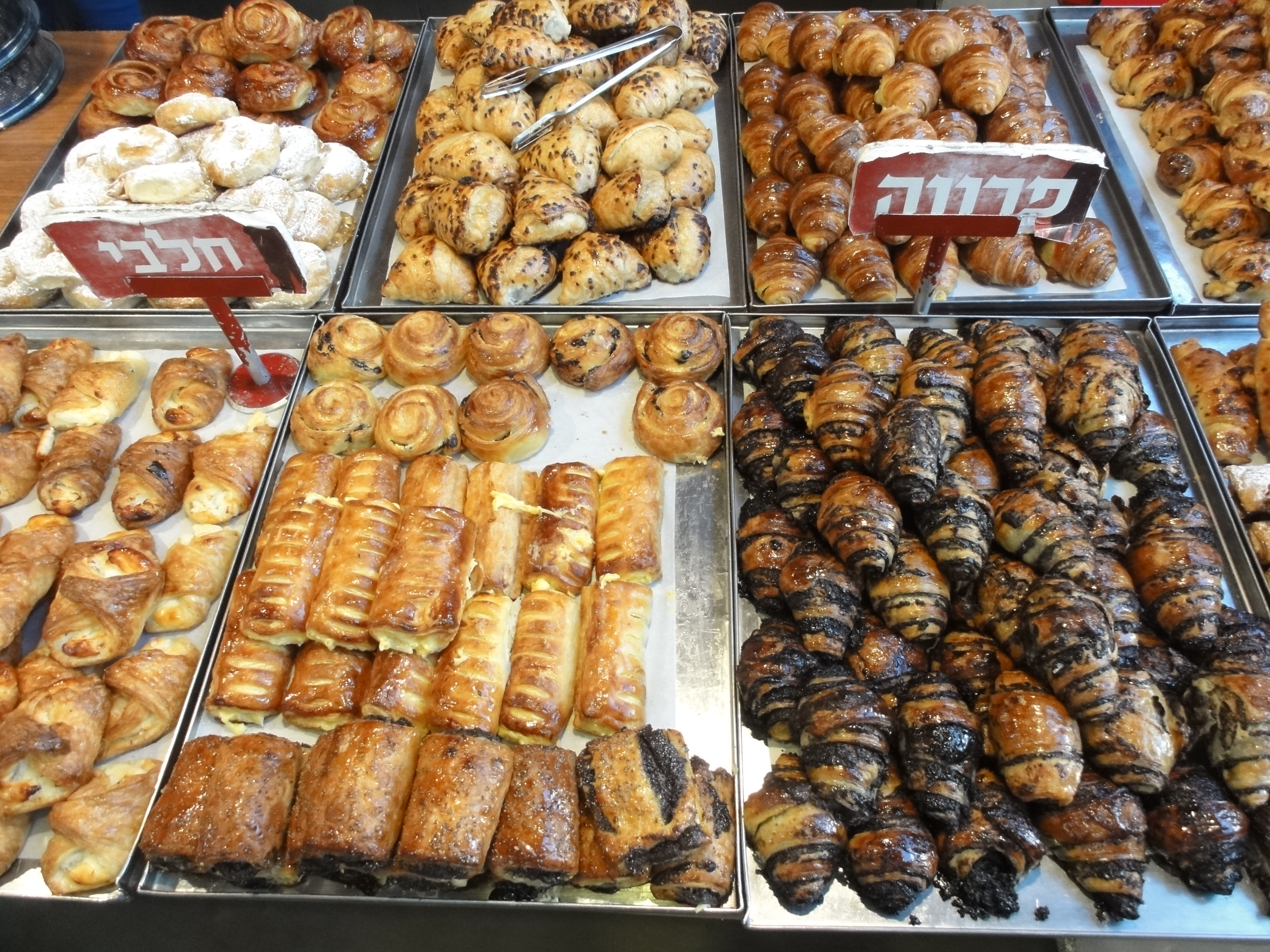
Rugelach and Israeli pastries

== See also ==
- American Jewish cuisine
- Ashkenazi Jewish cuisine
- Israeli cuisine
- Jewish cuisine

=== Other crescent pastries and rolls ===
- Croissant
- Kifli

=== Other fruit-filled pastries ===
- Bourekas
- Hamantash
- Kolach
- Krantz cake
- Ma'amoul
