= Cow Chocolate =

Brand of Israeli chocolate products

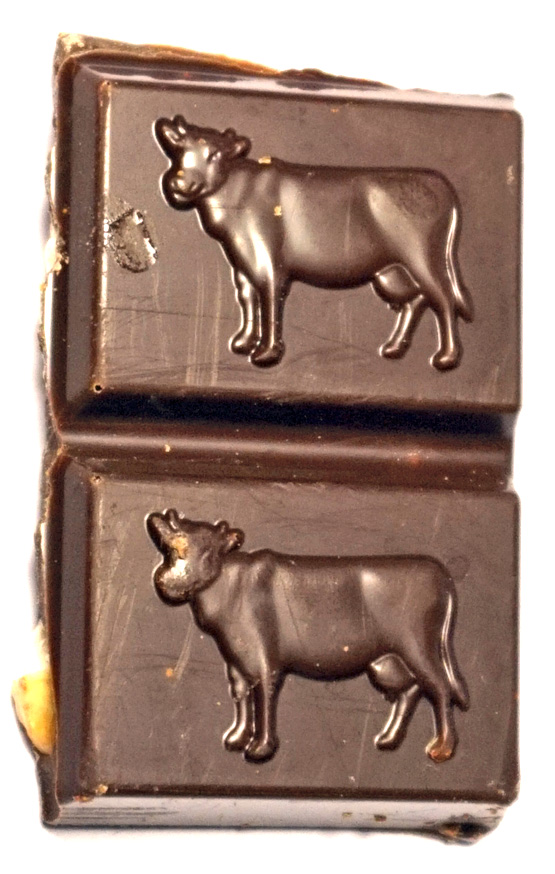
- Shokolad Para chocolate bar
- Alternative names: Hebrew: שוקולד פרה
- Course: Snack
- Place of origin: Israel
- Created by: Elite
- Main ingredients: Chocolate

Cow Chocolate (Hebrew: שוקולד פרה, romanized: Shokolad Para) is a brand of Israeli chocolate products produced by the candy and coffee products manufacturer Strauss-Elite.

Cow brand chocolate was first produced in 1934 under the name "Shamnunit" (Hebrew: שמנונית, lit. 'creamy'). Since the 1950s, the wrapping of the chocolate bar has featured the illustration of a cow, giving the product its name.

Cow chocolate is one of the company's leading products and one of the most widely sold chocolate bar brands in Israel.

Since 2002, the Cow Chocolate brand has expanded to include chocolate spread, snacks and candy. Changes have also been made in the cow logo.

== See also ==
- Israeli cuisine
- Bamba (snack)
