= Pesek Zman =

Israeli brand of chocolate

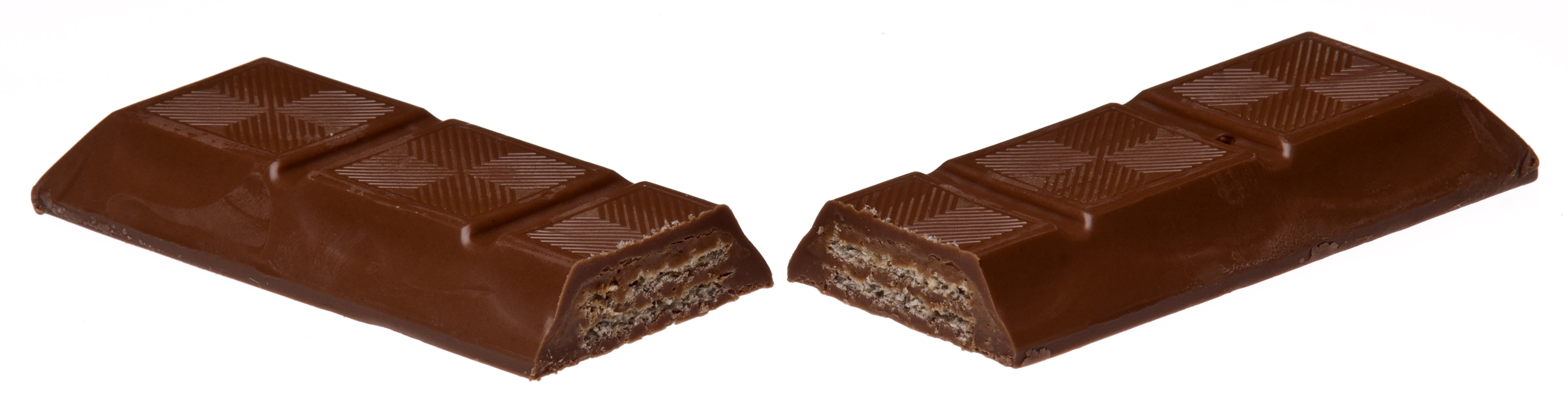
- An Elite brand Pesek Zman candy bar, shown split.
- Alternative names: Hebrew: פסק זמן
- Course: Snack
- Place of origin: Israel
- Created by: Elite
- Invented: 1982
- Main ingredients: Chocolate, wafer
- Variations: BigBite, 4Play, 2Good, Fingers, Red

Pesek Zman (Hebrew: פסק זמן, lit. 'Time Out') is an Israeli brand of chocolate bar, manufactured by Strauss Group's Strauss Israel company under its Elite confectionery brand.

== Description ==
The original bar was flat and measured about 20 cm length, 4 cm width and 1 cm thick. The snack consists of two layers: a wafer and a chocolate coating. The wafer contains chocolate cream. In 2008, the chocolate cream was replaced by hazelnut cream.

The snack was introduced in 1982. Since then, many different versions of the snack were created.

== Varieties ==
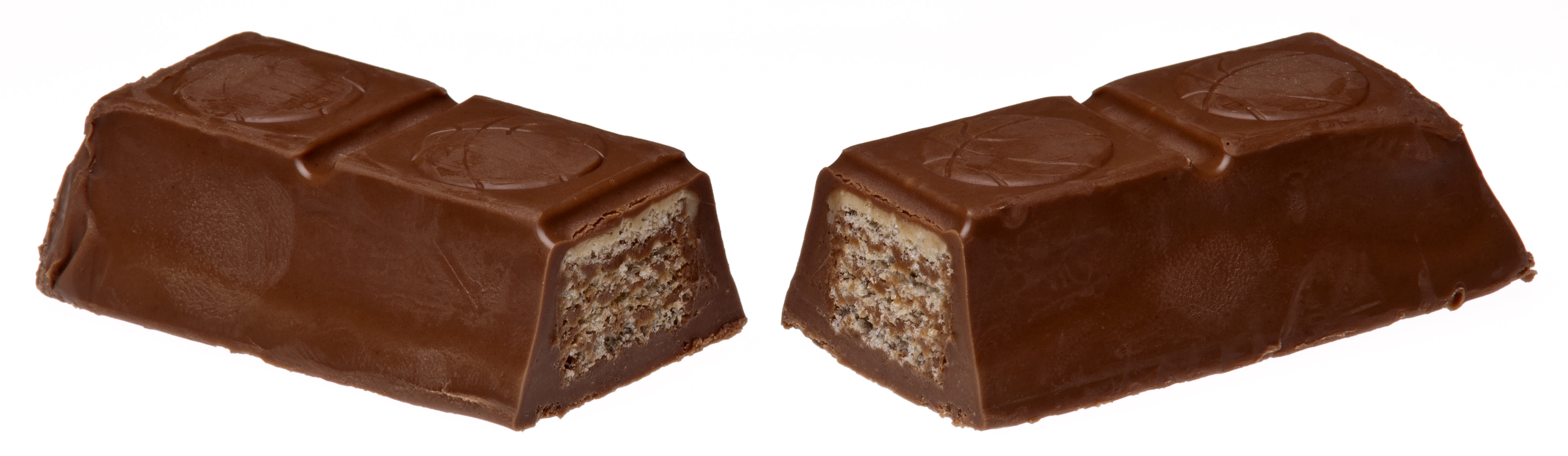
An Elite brand Pesek Zman Big Bite candy bar, split open

Mini Pesek Zman
a small version, consists of only two cubes (instead of 5 cubes in the normal size).
Big Bite
a thicker version of the Pesek Zman snack, which includes a bigger wafer layer and a total of 4 cubes
4Play
a thicker version of Pesek Zman snack in a basketball shape, which includes wafer, nougat, chocolate, milk and hazelnut cream. Consists of four cubes.
Red Pesek Zman
rolled wafer version, including nougat and chocolate, with a red wrapping. In addition to the original rolled wafer version, there are also white chocolate and dark chocolate versions.
Fingers
chocolate tablets divided into seven chocolate fingers with creme filling
2Good
two milk chocolate snacks filled with rolled waffle and hazelnut cream, covered with chocolate chips

== Advertising ==
Pesek Zman is Elite's most famous product. Elite invests substantially in advertising the product. Its leading slogan is: "Take Pesek Zman (time out), a sweet moment in life". The advertisements of Pesek Zman mainly deal with sport themes.

Following the 2011 Israeli social justice protests, in February 2012 the snack made headlines in Israeli newspapers. It was published that in the United States, the snack is significantly cheaper than in Israel, where it is manufactured. This revelation started a protest against the Strauss company on social networking websites.
