= Klik (candy) =

Israeli chocolate brand

- Product type: Confectionery
- Current owner: Unilever
- Country: Israel
- Markets: Israel, North America, United Kingdom, France, Australia, Argentina
- Website: https://www.unilever.co.il/brands/nutrition/klik/

Klik (Hebrew: קליק) is an Israeli candy brand owned by Unilever Food Solutions, a subsidiary of Unilever. It is used for various chocolate, candy, and chocolate-covered products, including chocolate-covered corn flakes and malted milk balls.

== Overview ==
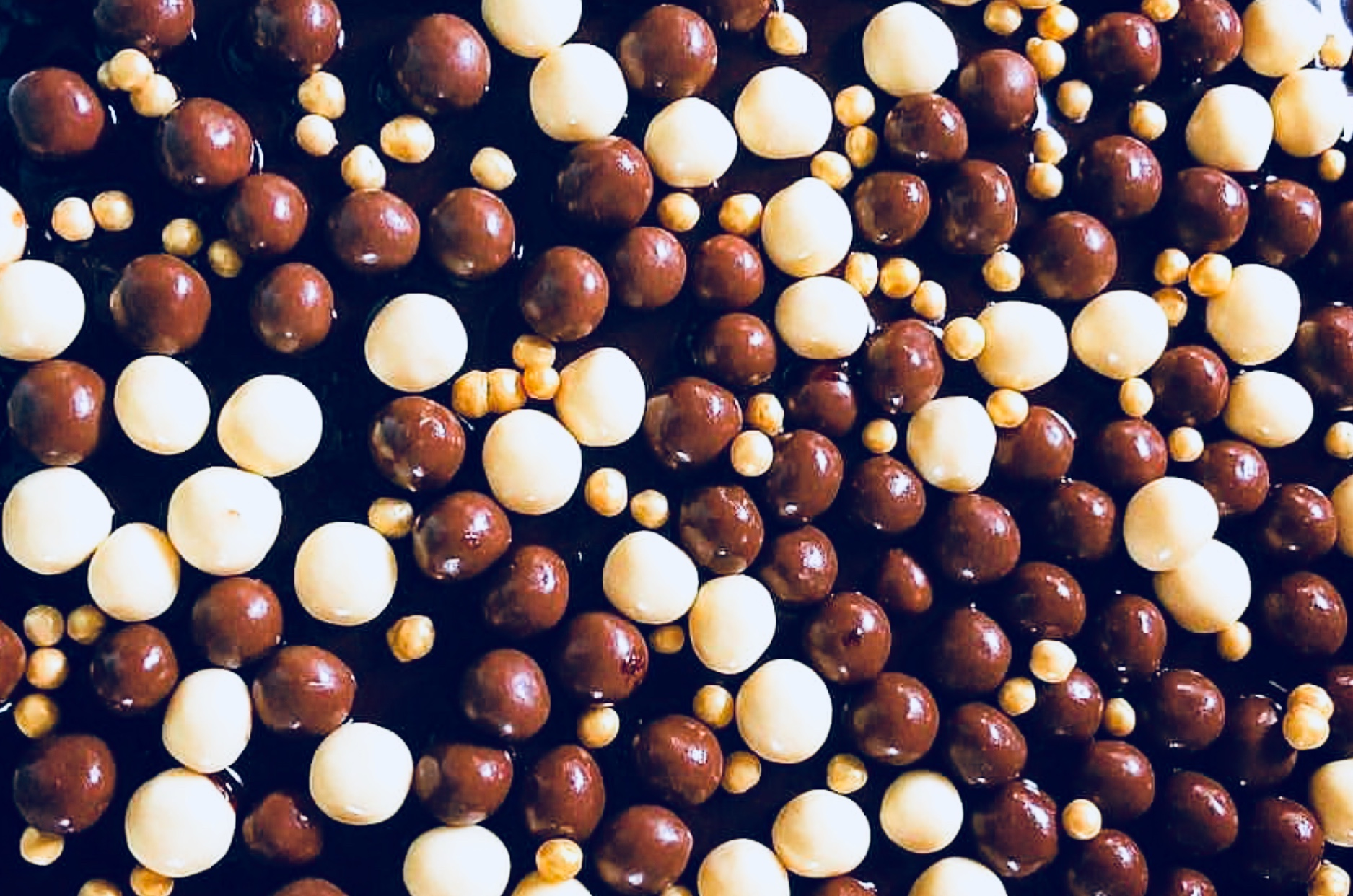
Milk and white chocolate pearls by Klik.

In 2011, the brand was the second leading chocolate brand in Israel with an 11.4% market share, compared to the 28.2% held by market leader Cow Chocolate.

== History ==
Between 1992 and 2003, products using the sub-brand Glik were sold to the Ultra-Orthodox community and were kosher certified by Edah HaChareidis.

In 2015 and 2016, Unilever was criticized for significantly raising the effective price of Klik by reducing package sizes while retaining the previous price.

In 2016 following an attempted coverup of Salmonella contamination in Unilever's cereal production line, sales of Unilever products, including Klik, plummeted.
