= Bourekas =

Filled turnover in Sephardic Jewish cuisine

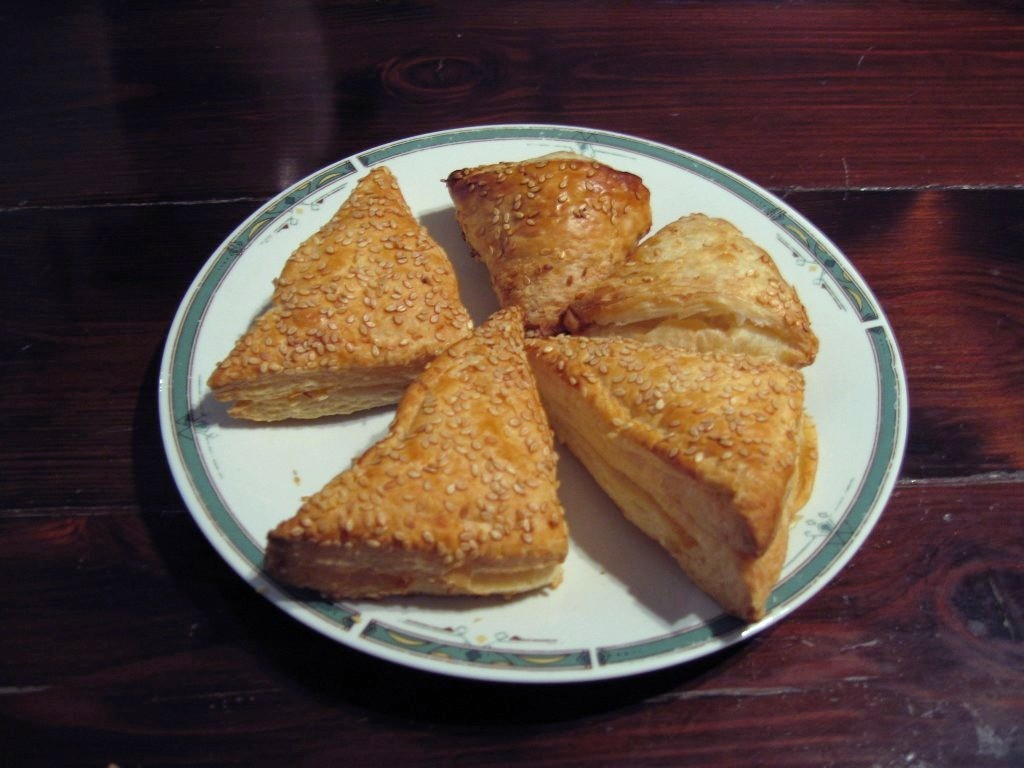
- Typical Israeli bourekas, traditionally topped with sesame, poppy or nigella seeds
- Alternative names: Burekas, bureka, boureka, borekas, burekasim
- Type: Turnover
- Course: Fast food, Shabbat breakfast
- Associated cuisine: Jewish cuisine
- Main ingredients: Puff pastry or phyllo; filling
- Variations: Feta cheese, tzfat cheese, kashkaval cheese, mashed potato, spinach, mallow mushrooms, pizza; less commonly ground beef, lamb, chicken with pine nuts and almonds, vegetables, or a sweet filling such as muhallebi

Bourekas or burekas (Hebrew: בורקס, Ladino: burekas) are a baked turnover in Sephardic Jewish cuisine and Israeli cuisine. A variation of the burek, a common baked good throughout southern Europe, the Middle East and North Africa, Israeli bourekas are made in a wide variety of shapes and a vast selection of fillings, and are typically made with either puff pastry, filo dough, or brik pastry, depending on the origin of the baker.

== Etymology ==
As knowledge of Ladino is lost among the younger generation of Sephardic Jews, Judeo-Spanish has become a "language of food". Food names have been described as "the last Judeo-Spanish remains" of the cultural memory of Ottoman-Sephardic heritage. The word boureka (or borekita) is a Judeo-Spanish loanword from the Turkish börek. Spanish does not have the front rounded Turkish ö sound, so the word becomes boreka.

As one Turkish food writer put it, "Ladino is the borekitas of the granmama".

In Judeo-Spanish boreka originally referred to empanada-style turnover, while the traditional Ottoman börek were called bulema.

== Overview ==
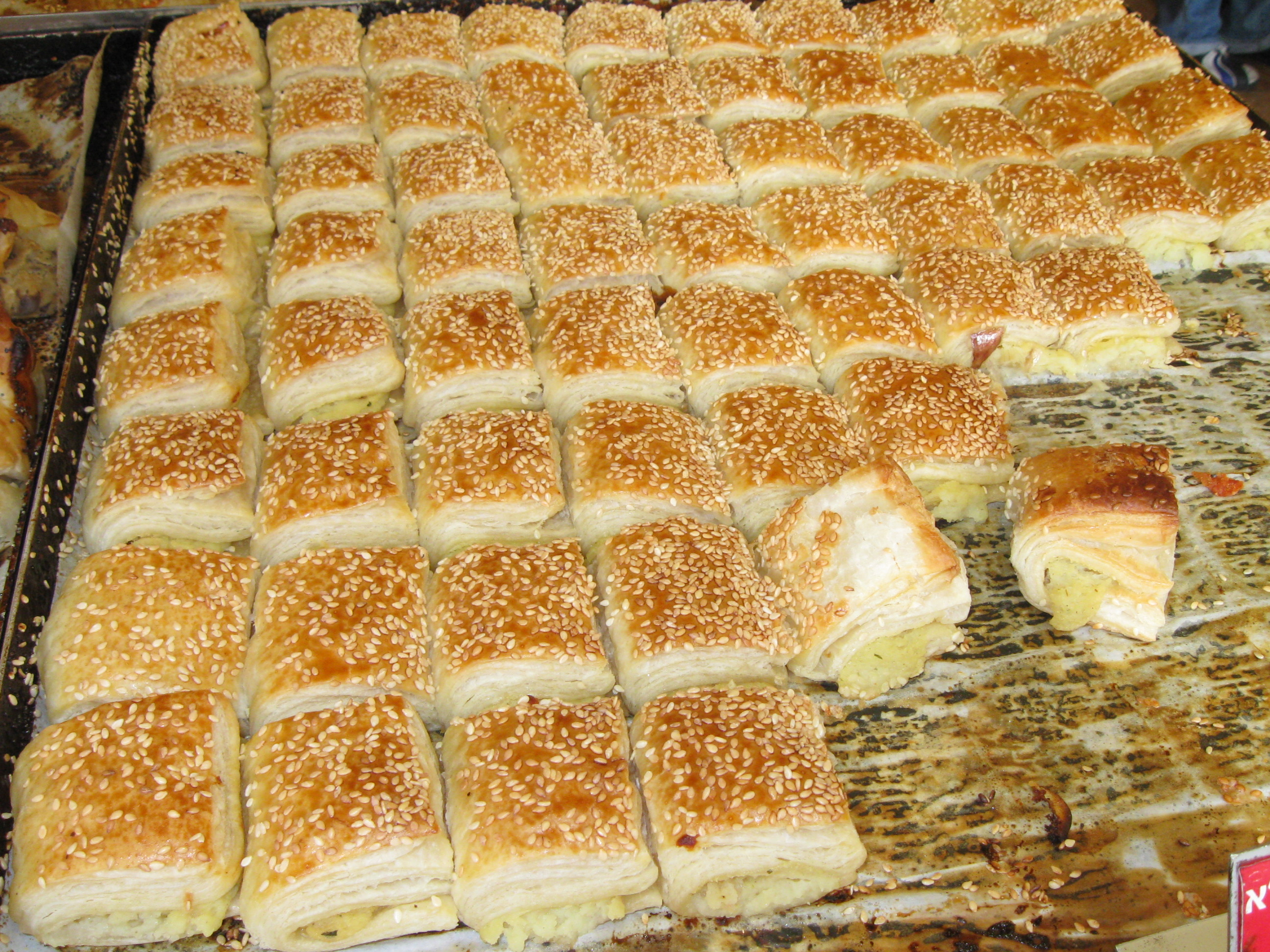
Potato bourekas for sale at the Machane Yehuda market in Jerusalem.

Bourekas have been called "the Israeli equivalent of Jewish-American bagel and cream cheese" and are served for almost any occasion, from a meeting of Israeli soldiers to a Shabbat kiddush. Gil Marks has said:

In Modern Israel, borekas…follows only falafel in popularity as a street snack food and rank among the favorite home treats for the Sabbath or a simple weekday nosh.

Bourekas are a very common street food in Israel, and are served at shuks (outdoor markets) and eateries in the Machane Yehuda market in Jerusalem, Levinsky Market as well as the Carmel Market in Tel Aviv, and Israeli restaurants and cafes. They are also baked in dedicated boureka bakeries specializing in baking bourekas.

Bourekas are often made out of puff pastry filled with various fillings. Among the most common fillings are feta cheese, kashkaval cheese, minced meat, mashed potato, spinach and cheese, eggplant, and mushrooms.

Sephardic Jews also make a special version of borekitas that are deep-fried, soaked in honey, and filled with nuts, served as a traditional Purim sweet. It is known as travadicos among Jews in Turkey and bourekitas de muez among Jews in Greece.

== History ==
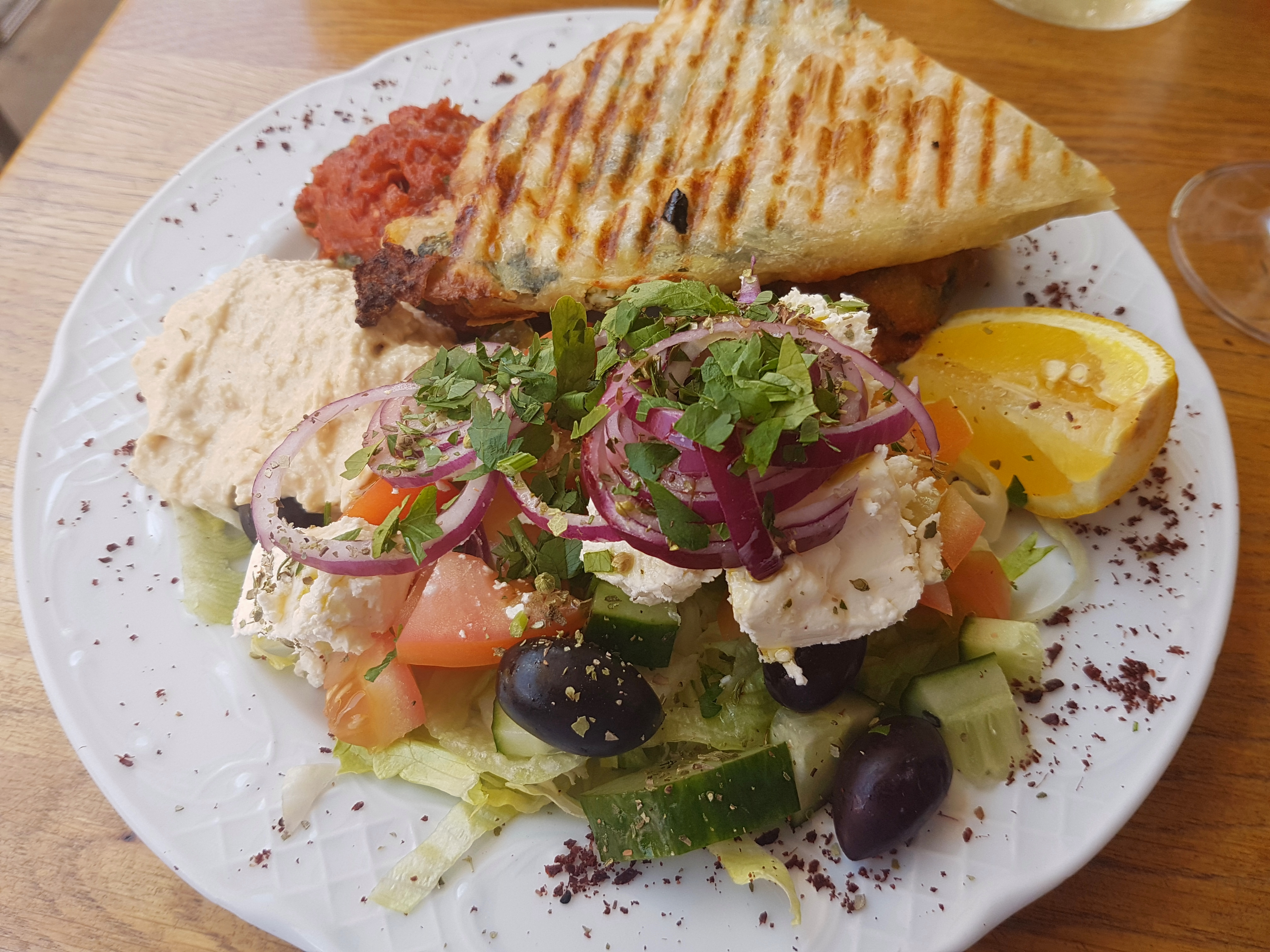
Bourekas served with Israeli salad, olives and feta cheese at an Israeli restaurant abroad.

=== Early history ===
In some towns of Emilia-Romagna, such as the former city-states Ferrara and Modena, the Jewish community used to consume a half-moon-shaped sweet turnover called burriche or burricche.

=== 1478 to 1800s ===
The Sephardi Jews who were expelled from Spain sought refuge in the Ottoman Empire.

Most of these places were under the control of the Ottoman Empire.

The Sephardic Jews created a new dish which adapted börek to their kosher dietary laws, and combined it with their traditional empanadas to create bourekas.

== Shapes ==
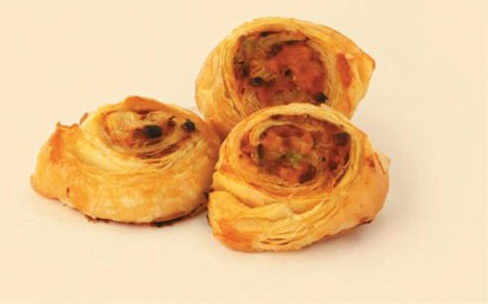
Pizza bourekas made in a round shape

Israeli bourekas come in a variety of shapes, which are indicative of their fillings. The laws of kashrut require avoiding eating dairy turnovers together with ones containing meat, so conventional, distinctive shapes are used to indicate different types of fillings. Cheese bourekas come in right-angled and isosceles triangles, and have two different sizes. Potato bourekas come in a certain box shape. Pizza bourekas resemble a concentric tower. Spinach bourekas resemble a pastry knot. There are also the so-called "Turkish bourekas" which form rounded equilateral triangles, with various fillings whose type can usually be determined by the addition on their outside.

=== Shape regulation ===
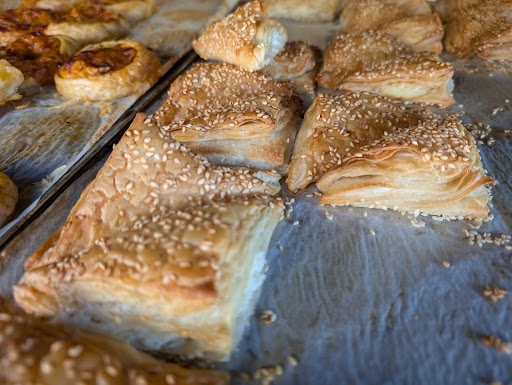
Triangular-shaped cheese bourekas sold in Jerusalem

In June 2013, the Chief Rabbinate of Israel started requiring bourekas (and also rugelach and croissants) to have specific shapes to be sold by kosher-certified bakers in Israel. According to the law, all bourekas made with puff pastry and containing dairy products had to be shaped into triangles, while parve (nondairy) bourekas made with puff pastry had to be made in round or square shapes. The Chief Rabbinate also implemented different regulations regarding the shape of bourekas made with phyllo dough; these bourekas must be made in triangular shapes if parve, and "snake-shaped" if made with dairy.

== Preparation ==
Traditionally, making bourekas was a very time-consuming process, taking many hours until the bourekas were finished. Bourekas are traditionally made with freshly made enriched dough, either similar to puff pastry or phyllo depending on the origin of the baker, although brik pastry, malawach dough, and viennoiserie dough are also sometimes used. To make homemade phyllo for bourekas, a simple flour and water dough is rolled out like thin flatbreads. They are brushed with oil then layered until the dough is very elastic and can be hand pulled until it is translucent. It is a laborious process and store-bought frozen puff pastry or phyllo dough is more commonly used by home chefs today.

The dough is then rolled out, and it is cut into various shapes. Any variety of fillings is placed into the center of each piece of dough, the edges of which are sealed with egg wash or water. Each boureka is then brushed with an egg wash and topped with seeds or seasoning, and is baked.

Bourekas are also very commonly sold frozen in grocery and convenience stores in Israel by brands including Ta'amti and Tnuva in flavors such as cheese, spinach and cheese, potato, and pizza.

=== Toppings ===
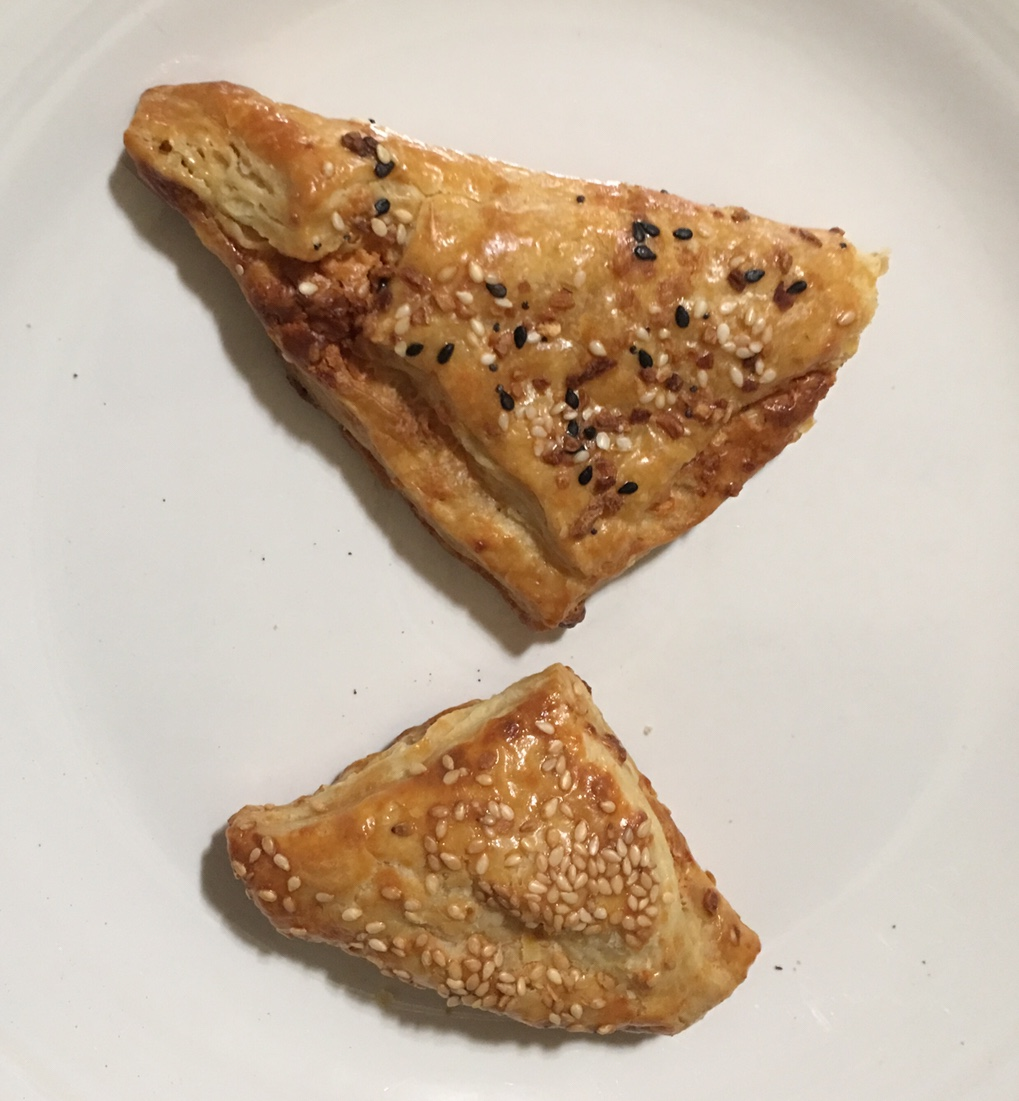
Everything Bourekas, cheese bourekas topped with everything bagel seasoning.

Bourekas are traditionally topped with any multitude of seeds. Sesame seeds are most common; however, depending on the filling, poppy seeds, black sesame seeds, everything bagel seasoning, nigella seeds, or za'atar may be used as a topping.

== Side dishes and condiments ==
Savory bourekas are traditionally paired with hard-boiled eggs or haminados, a hot sauce such as skhug or harif, grated tomato, and sometimes tahini sauce, as well as olives, Israeli pickles, other pickled vegetables, and sometimes a salad as well. The use of skhug and grated tomato as an accompaniment to bourekas originated within the Yemenite Jewish community of Israel, who serve many of their traditional breads such as malawach in a similar manner.

== In popular culture ==
=== Bourekas films ===
"Bourekas films" (Hebrew: סרטי בורקס sirtei burekas) are a type of Israeli movie from the 1970s dealing with certain cultural aspects of Israelis, especially lower-class Mizrahi Israelis and their conflicts with the Ashkenazi establishment. The term is a calque on "spaghetti Western".

== See also ==
- Bulemas – a related type of Sephardic Jewish pastries
- Empanada
- Knish – a similar Ashkenazi Jewish pastry
- Rugelach
- Samosa
- Spanikopita
- Tyropita
