= Börek =

Stuffed phyllo pastry

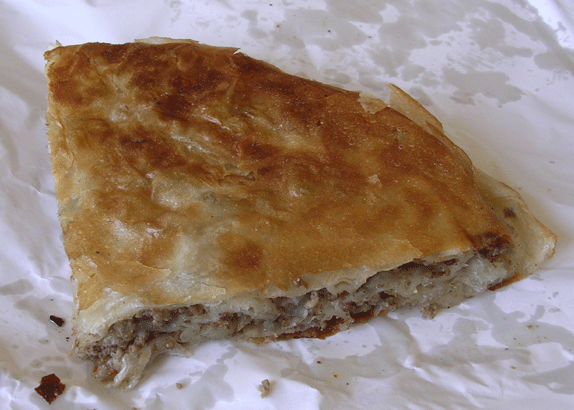
- Alternative names: Burek, börek, bourekas, boreg, byrek
- Type: Savoury pie
- Course: Tea pastry
- Main ingredients: Flaky pastry (usually filo), various fillings
- Variations: Meat, potatoes, leafy greens, cheese, eggplant, mushrooms

Börek (Turkish: [bœ.ˈɾec]), also referred to as burek or byrek or burekas, is a family of pastries made in West Asia and Southeast Europe. The pastry is made of a thin flaky dough such as filo with a variety of fillings, such as meat, cheese, spinach, or potatoes. A borek may be prepared in a large pan and cut into portions after baking, or as individual pastries. They are usually baked but some varieties can be fried. Borek is sometimes sprinkled with sesame or nigella seeds, and it can be served hot or cold.

Throughout Southeast Europe and in West Asia, it is commonly served with ayran, or yogurt. It is a custom of Sephardic Jews to have bourekas for their Shabbat breakfast meal on Saturday mornings.

== Etymology ==
The word börek, defined as "a stuffed pancake", is of Turkish origin and comes from the Turkish verb bürmek, meaning "to roll" or "to twist". The verb derives from Old Turkic bürük ("to gather"), and in turn from the verbal root bür- ("to cover", "to wrap", or "to gather").

The earliest mention of börek is by Mevlana, dating back to the 13th century. Kitâb al-Idrâk li-lisân al-Atrâk, a Kipchak-Turkic and Arabic dictionary compiled by Abu Hayyan al-Gharnati in the early 14th-century, defines börek as "pieces of dough stuffed with meat", and records şiş börek for a variety cooked onto a skewer.

Burek is used in the countries of the former Yugoslavia. Forms in other languages include: Albanian: byrek; Greek: μπουρέκι, romanized: bouréki; Hungarian: burek and börek; Armenian: բյորեկ, romanized: byorek; Algerian Arabic: بُريك, romanized: bourek and brick annabi; and Tunisian Arabic: brik.

== History ==
The exact origin of börek is unclear, with many cultures claiming credit, while the general practice of layering thin breads and fillings has been perserved and independently invented by multiple different cultures.

One theory posits that the dish in general is a descendant of the pre-existing Eastern Roman (Byzantine) dish en tyritas plakountas (Byzantine Greek: εν τυρίτας πλακούντας) "cheesy placenta", itself a descendant of placenta, the classical baked layered dough dish of Ancient Greek, Ancient Roman and Byzantine cuisine. Antiphanes (4th century BC), a contemporary of Archestratos, provided an ornate description of plakous with wheat flour and goat's cheese as key ingredients:

The streams of the tawny bee, mixed with the curdled river of bleating she-goats, placed upon a flat receptacle of the virgin daughter of Demeter [honey, cheese, flour], delighting in ten thousand delicate toppings – or shall I simply say plakous? I'm for plakous' (Antiphanes quoted by Athenaeus).

Later, in 160 BC, Cato the Elder provided a recipe for placenta in his De agri cultura which Andrew Dalby considers, along with Cato's other dessert recipes, to be in the "Greek tradition", and possibly copied from a Greek cookbook.

Shape the placenta as follows: place a single row of tracta along the whole length of the base dough. This is then covered with the mixture [cheese and honey] from the mortar. Place another row of tracta on top and go on doing so until all the cheese and honey have been used up. Finish with a layer of tracta...place the placenta in the oven and put a preheated lid on top of it [...] When ready, honey is poured over the placenta. (Cato the Elder, De Agri Cultura)

Through its Byzantine Greek name plakountos, the dessert was adopted into Armenian cuisine as plagindi, plagunda, and pghagund (Armenian: պլագինդի, պլագունդա, պղագունդ), „all cakes of bread and honey." From the latter term came the later Arabic name iflaghun, which is mentioned in the medieval Arab cookbook Wusla ila al-habib as a specialty of the Cilician Armenians settled in southern Asia Minor and settled in the neighboring Crusader kingdoms of northern Syria. Thus, the dish may have traveled to the Levant in the Middle Ages via the Armenians, many of whom migrated there following the first appearance of the Turkish tribes in medieval Anatolia.

Another theory posits that börek also developed from the Turkic custom of preparing thin flatbread (yufka), which was often layered with butter or fillings between the layers, bordering on pastry. The origin of the paper-thin sheets of dough that are used to make börek, known as filo today, is also disputed, with some attributing the origin of filo to the Ancient Greeks; Homer's Odyssey, written around 800 BC, mentions thin breads sweetened with walnuts and honey. In the fifth century BC, Philoxenos states in his poem "Dinner" that, in the final drinking course of a meal, hosts would prepare and serve cheesecake made with milk and honey that was baked into a pie. Desserts made with this prototype would include the placenta cake, which historian Speros Vryonis describes as a "Byzantine favorite" and "the same as baklava". While others attribute the invention of filo to the imperial kitchens of the Topkapı Palace in Ottoman Istanbul.

The earliest record of the Turkish word börek appears in the 12th-century Turkish epic Danishmendnâme, where a sweet pastry called şeker böreği is mentioned. The 14th-century Chinese cookbook Yinshan Zhengyao, compiled by the Uyghur court dietician Hu Sihui who served the Chinese Emperor during the Yuan dynasty, contains one of the first recorded recipes for börek, where a related pastry called päräk is described as being filled with chopped mutton, sheep's fat, leeks, and spices, and baked using a flat iron with butter or honey basted on it when done. Its sweet version, called chäkärli päräk, is filled with ground walnuts, honey, and an unidentifiable roasted ingredient, cooked on the wall of a tandoor oven.

These recipes are connected to the tradition of layered breads prepared by the nomadic Turks from Central Asia during the medieval times, who “had an obsessive interest in making layered bread, possibly in emulation of the thick oven breads of city people”. This bread was known as yufka, which is also the modern Turkish term synonymous to the Greek word filo, while yufka is thicker and prepared differently than filo, which is used to make börek today. Originally, börek was cooked on a saj, the flat griddle of iron used for making yufka, which was replaced today by other cooking methods including frying or baking, although the Kalmyks, a Mongolic people, boil their deviant büreg.

The 11th-century Turkic dictionary Dīwān Lughāt al-Turk by Mahmud Kashgari records the term yuvgha, an archaic form of yufka, defining it as “pleated or folded bread”. The dictionary mentions the term several times, including a variety of folded yufka called yalaci yuvgha that is described as “so fragile that it crumbled at the touch”. In 1433, the French pilgrim Bertrandon de la Brocquière (1400–1459) encountered Turcoman nomads in the mountains of southern Turkey, who offered him yufka with yogurt, cheese, and grapes. The yufka was made so quickly that Brocquière declared, "They make two of their cakes sooner than a waferman can make one wafer." Other yufkas were served folded with fillings of minced meat and onions.

Another preparation of yufka recorded by Kashghari, katma yuvgha, was not only folded but also cooked in butter, a technique still employed in the preparation of börek. According to Alya Algar, most elements involved in the making of börek were already present in the 11th century given that rolling pins called oklava were common and that yufkas were diversified enough to be called by different names. She notes that most Turkic languages of Central Asia have words denoting rolled flat bread, quite often layered with butter, some including fillings and thus border on pastry.

Several of these ancient layered breads survive among the Turkic peoples of Central Asia. In Uzbekistan, a cake known as yupga is made by frying a thin sheet of dough on both sides, layering minced meat and onions in it, covering the filling with a raw sheet of dough, turning it over to fry the raw side and then repeating the process to build up a cake that is 10 or more layers thick. A similar dish is made in Tatarstan called yoka, consisting of 10 to 12 thin sheets of dough that are fried, buttered, and stacked before being cut into wedges in pie-fashion and served with tea.

Yufkas may have evolved into a thinner dough more similar to modern filo after the Turks came in contact with the advanced cookery of Persian courts in the 10th century, who introduced an early form of puff pastry that involved laminating and buttering the dough, rolling it thin, and filling it with almonds. The rise of börek in West Asia is reflected in a poem by the 14th-century Persian poet Bushaq-i At’ima, and was even considered a rival to pilaf, describing an imaginary battle between borek and pilaf, which were personified as two rival monarchs. However, Gil Marks speculates that yufka evolved into a sophisticated, thin dough by the 15th century, at around the same time the modern börek was developing.

Others suggest that the Turkic dish buğra, a deep-fried filled dumpling credited to the ruler Bughra Khan, may have been one of the inspiriations of present-day börek due to their similarities in name and their commonness in the placing of filling in dough.

The dish was a popular element of Ottoman cuisine, and may have been present at the Ottoman court, though there are also indications it was made among Central Asian Turks. While other earlier versions of the dish date to the Classical era of the Greeks and Romans in the Mediterranean.

== Regional variants ==
Burek is popular in the cuisines of the former Byzantine, and Ottoman Empire, especially in North Africa and throughout the Balkans. Borek is also part of Mizrahi and Sephardic Jewish traditions. They have been adopted by the Ottoman Jewish communities, and have been described, along with boyos de pan and bulemas as forming "the trio of preeminent Ottoman Jewish pastries".

=== Algeria ===
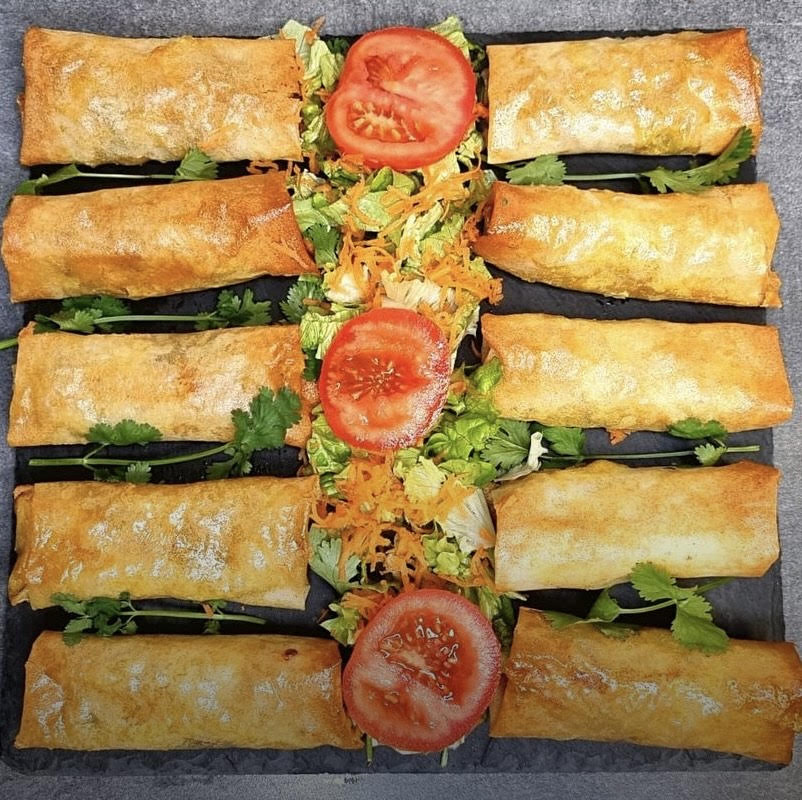
Algerian bourek pastry

In Algeria, this dish is called bourek, a roll of pastry sheet stuffed with meat, onions, and spice, is one of the main appetizers of Algerian cuisine.

It is a starter served when receiving guests and especially during Ramadan evenings during the round meal of the holy month, usually accompanied by Algerian Chorba or Harira. Other forms include bourek packed with chicken and onions, shrimp and béchamel sauce, or a vegetarian alternative usually made of mashed potatoes and spinach.

Another Algerian variant of Bourek is called Brik or Brika, a specialty of Algeria's east, notably Annaba. It is a savory entree made from brik leaf, stuffed with mashed potatoes and a mixture of minced meat, onions, cheese and parsley. The whole is topped with a seasoned raw egg which cooks once the sheet of brik has been folded and soaked in boiling oil.

=== Armenia ===
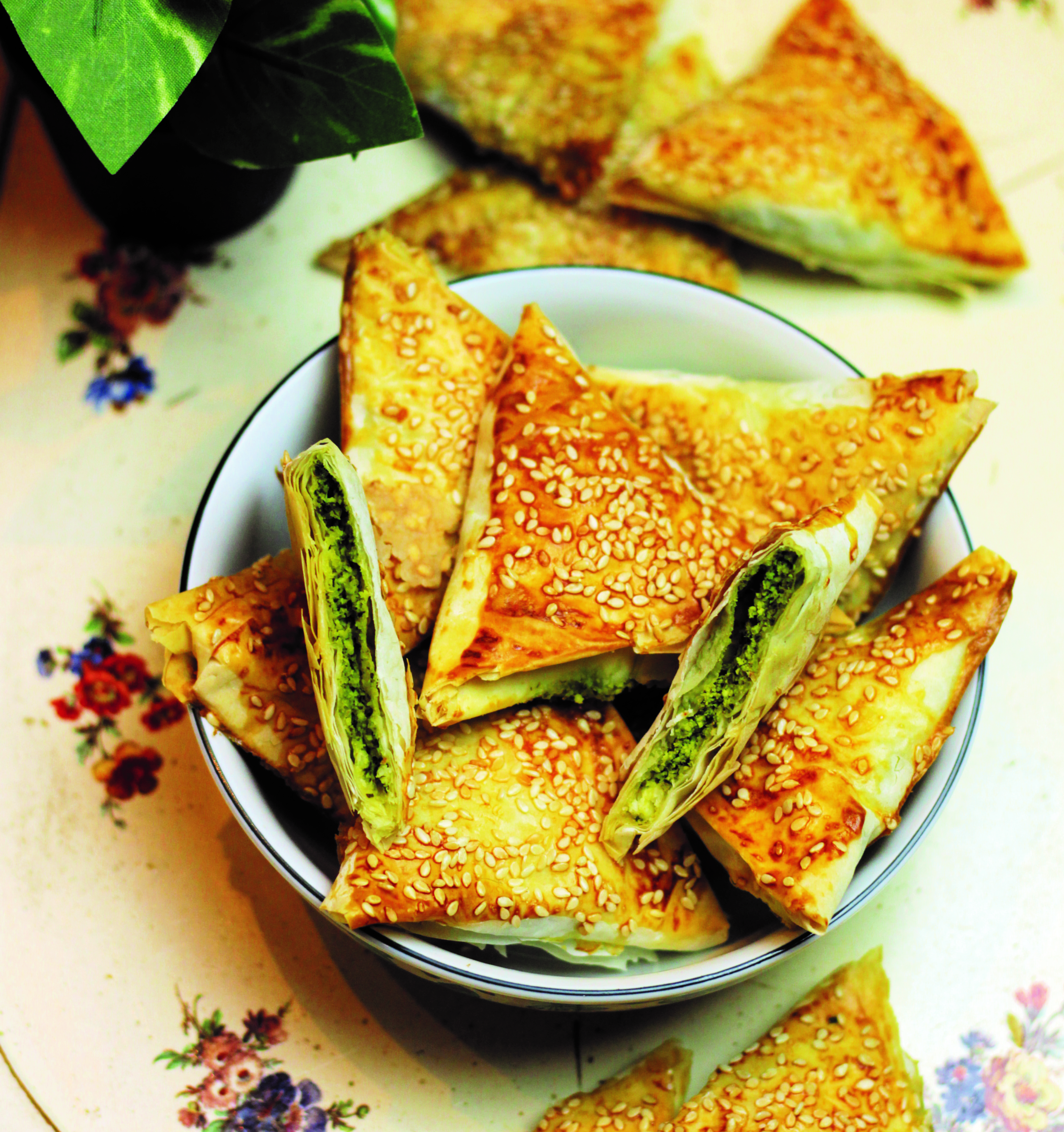
Armenian herb and cheese-stuffed byoreks

In Armenia, byorek (Armenian: բյորեկ) or borek (Armenian: բորեկ) consists of dough, or filo dough, folded into triangles and stuffed with spinach, onions and Armenian cheeses or ground beef.

Panri borek (Armenian: պանրի բորեկ), or cheese borek, is the most widespread variant in Armenian homes and bakeries. It is typically filled with cheeses such as lori, chechil, or motal. The filling is often mixed with herbs like tarragon or parsley and encased in folded or rolled phyllo dough. In some regions, lavash is often used instead of phyllo. This variety is often served during breakfast, or at festive gatherings.

Msov borek (Armenian: մսով բորեկ, “meat borek”) is a savory pastry made with seasoned ground beef or lamb, often including onions. It is usually fried and served hot. In the diaspora, triangular fried versions are especially popular and often appear on meze platters during New Year's and Easter feasts.

Spanakhov borek (Armenian: սպանախով բորեկ), or spinach borek, is filled with chopped spinach and cheese, and sometimes eggs or onion. It is reminiscent of the Greek spanakopita, but reflects Armenian taste with different seasoning and different cheese blends. It is eaten both warm and cold and is also prepared without dairy during Lent.

=== Albania and Kosovo ===
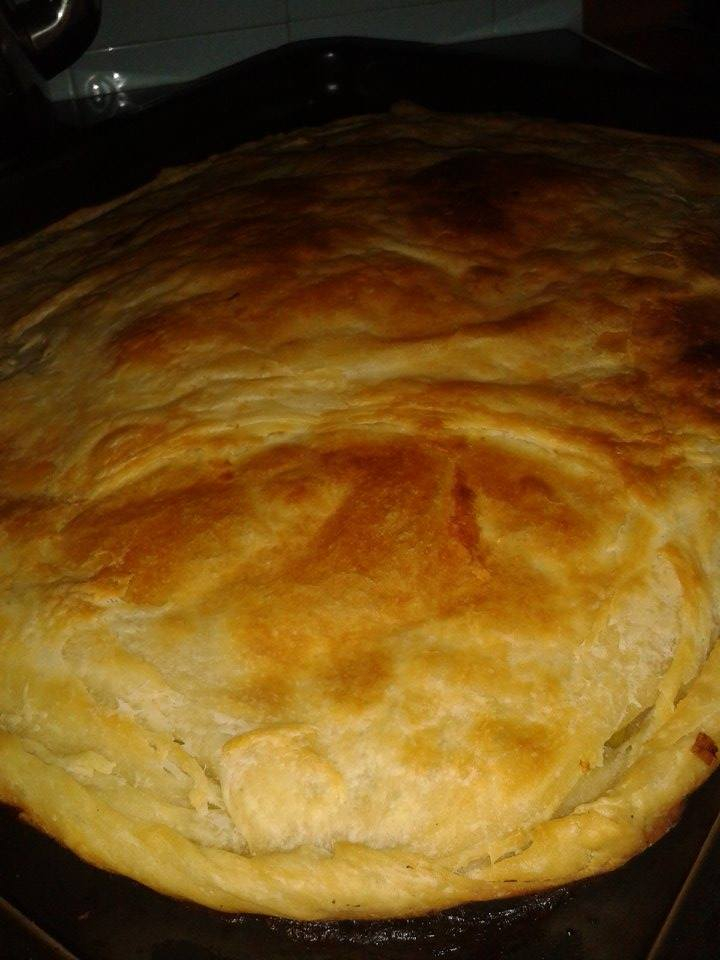
Byrek in Albania

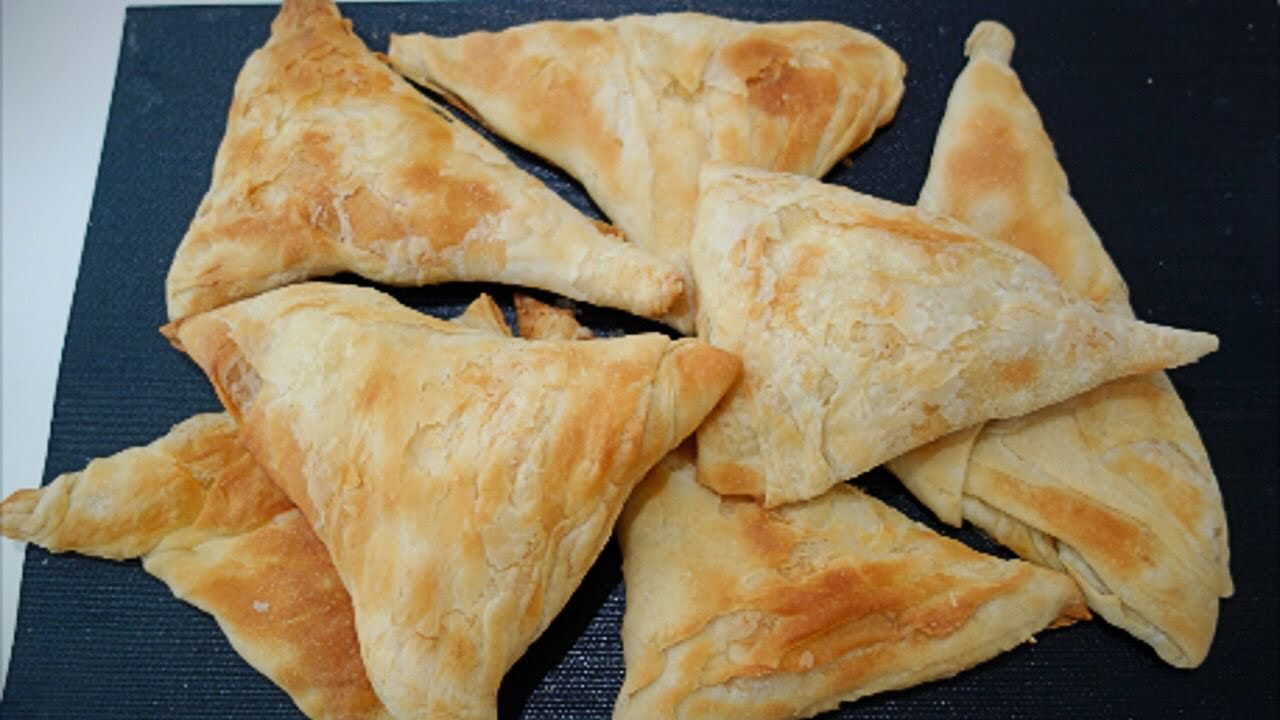
Albanian triangle byrek

In Albania, this dish is called (Albanian: byrek). In Kosovo and a few other regions, byrek is also known as "pite". Byrek is traditionally made with several layers of dough that have been thinly rolled out by hand. The final form can be small, individual triangles, especially from street vendors called "byrektore" which sell byrek and other traditional pastries and drinks. It can also be made as one large byrek that is cut into smaller pieces. There are different regional variations of byrek. It can be served cold or hot.

The most common fillings include: cheese (especially gjizë, salted curd cheese), ground meat and onions (ragù-style filling), spinach and eggs, milk and eggs with pre-baked dough layers, it can also be made with tomato and onions, peppers and beans, potato or a sweet filling of pumpkin, nettles (known as byrek me hithra), or kidney beans (byrek me fasule) which is popular in winter.

There are mainly two categories of Albanian Byrek. The house byrek (byrek shtëpie) and triangle byrek (byrek trekendësh), the latter being mostly used as street food.

Lakror is an Albanian pie dish from southern Albania. The pie is sometimes called a type of byrek pastry. Lakror is generally filled with a variety of greens or meats. Another related dish is Fli, typical from the North of Albania and Kosovo. It is made up of layers of a flour and water batter, cream and butter. Traditionally, it is baked on embers like lakror.

=== Bulgaria ===
The Bulgarian version of the pastry, locally called byurek (Cyrillic: бюрек), is typically regarded as a variation of banitsa (баница), a similar Bulgarian dish. Bulgarian byurek is a type of banitsa with sirene cheese, the difference being that byurek also has eggs added.

In Bulgarian, byurek has also come to be applied to other dishes similarly prepared with cheese and eggs, such as chushka byurek (чушка бюрек), a peeled and roasted pepper filled with cheese, and tikvichka byurek (тиквичка бюрек), blanched or uncooked bits of squash with eggs filling.

=== Greece ===
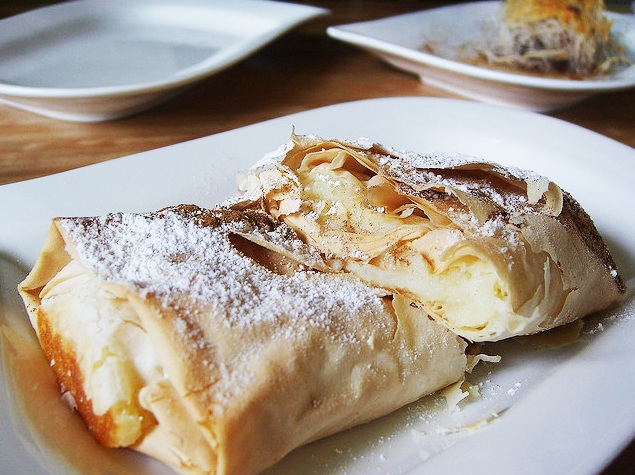
Greek custard bougatsa served in Thessaloniki

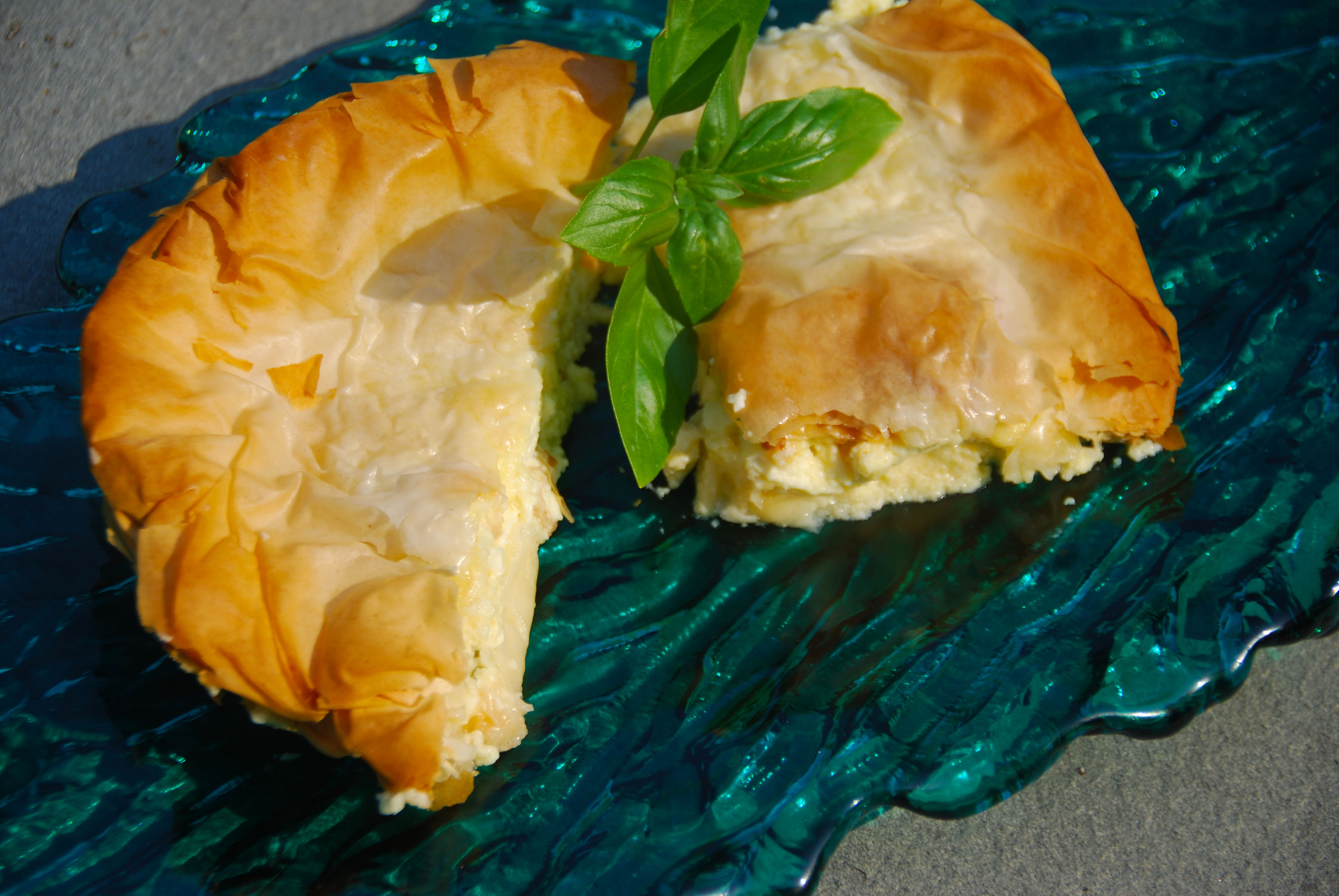
Greek tiropita served with mint

In Greece/Greek cuisine, boureki (Greek: μπουρέκι), or bourekaki (Greek: μπουρεκάκι), and Cyprus poureki (πουρέκι, in the Greek dialects of the island) are small pastries made with filo dough. Pastries of the Greek burek family are also called pita (pie).

Galaktoboureko (Greek: γαλακτομπούρεκο) is a dessert popular in Greece, Cyprus and also used to be popular in formerly Greek/Byzantine regions of Anatolia. It is made of custard, layers of filo dough and covered in syrup. Galaktoboureko is made with a type of pudding called muhallebi or semolina custard.

Bougatsa (Greek: μπουγάτσα) is a Greek variation of a burek which consists of either semolina custard, cheese, or minced meat filling between layers of phyllo, and is said to originate in the city of Serres. Nowadays, it is most popular in Thessaloniki, a city that lies in the Central Macedonia region of Northern Greece. Serres achieved the record for the largest puff pastry on 1 June 2008. It weighed 182.2 kg (402 lb), was 20 metres (66 ft) long, and was made by more than 40 bakers.

Tiropita (Greek: τυρóπιτα, "cheese-pie") is a Greek pastry made with layers of buttered filo dough and filled with a cheese-egg mixture. It is served either in an individual-size free-form wrapped shape, or as a larger pie that is portioned. When made with kasseri cheese, it may be called kasseropita (κασερόπιτα).

Spanakopita (Greek: σπανακόπιτα, from σπανάκι spanáki'spinach', and πίτα píta 'pie') is a Greek savory spinach pie that often also contains cheese, typically feta. In such a case it may be called spanakotiropita (Greek: σπανακοτυρόπιτα "spinach-cheese pie"). In southern Greece, the term spanakopita is also common for the versions with cheese. A version without cheese and eggs is eaten during religious fasts throughout Greece. Spanakopita appears in many traditional Greek cookbooks and appears in numerous restaurants and hotel menus throughout Greece and internationally.

In Epirus, σκερ-μπουρέκ is a marzipan-like sweet flavored with rose water from Konitsa, traditionally offered at major celebrations such as weddings, engagements, and during Lent. It was considered a difficult dessert, due to the rarity and refinement of Its aroma.

In Venetian Corfu, boureki was also called burriche, and filled with meat and leafy greens. The Pontian Greek piroski (πιροσκί) derives its name from borek too. It is almost identical in name and form to pirozhki (Russian: пирожки), which is of Slavic origin, and popular in Russia and further east.

=== Moldova and Romania ===
The regional cuisine of the Moldavian West bank of the Pruth still yields a type of dumpling-like food called burechiuşe (sometimes called burechiţe) which is described as dough in the shape of a ravioli-like square which is filled with mushrooms such as Boletus edulis, and sealed around its edges and then tossed and subsequently boiled in borscht like soups or chorbas. They are traditionally eaten in the last day of fasting at the time of the Christmas Eve. It is not clear if the burechiuşe derive their name from the Turco-Greek börek (which is a distinct possibility given the fact that Moldavia was ruled for many decades by dynasties of Greek Phanariotes and that encouraged Greek colonists to settle in the area), so at the receiving end of cultural and culinary influences coming from them, or it takes its name from that of the mushroom Boletus (burete in its Romanian language rhotacised version, and it meant "mushroom" as well as "sponge") by the pattern of the ravioli, which were named after the Italian name of the turnip with which they were once filled.

In Romania, the plăcintă is considered a variation of the phyllo-wrapped pie, with the dough traditionally stuffed with cheese. In Dobruja, an eastern territory that used to be a Turkish province, one can find both the Turkish influence—plăcintă dobrogeană either filled with cheese or with minced meat and served with sheep yoghurt or the Tatar street food Suberek—a deep-fried half-moon cheese-filled dough.

=== Turkey ===
Börek are a major class of dish in Turkish cuisine, with a wide variety prepared for different occasions and in different regions across Turkey. The word börek in Turkish can be modified by a descriptive word referring to the shape, ingredients of the pastry, or a specific region where it is typically prepared, as in the above kol böreği, su böreği, talaş böreği or sarıyer böreği. There are many variations of börek in Turkish cuisine:

Name	English name	Description	Image	Notes
Su böreği	Boiled börek; lit. water börek	Sheets of dough are boiled briefly in large pans, then a mixture of feta cheese and greens, or other börek filling. The whole thing is brushed with butter and baked in a masonry oven.		
Sigara böreği	Filo rolls, lit. 'cigarette börek'	Feta cheese, wiener, potato or other filling wrapped in yufka filo and deep-fried		
Paçanga böreği	Pachanga pastry	Paçanga böreği is made with yufka filled with cheese, pastirma, tomato, parsley and pepper. Each material is chopped into thin or small pieces, and rolled in the dough as in sigara böreği, but larger. The pastries are fried and served hot. It is a specialty of Anatolia.		
Talaş böreği or Nemse böreği	Lit. sawdust pastry	Small square börek mostly filled with lamb cubes and green peas, that has starchier yufka sheets, making it puffy and crispy.		
Kol böreği	Lit. 'arm börek'	prepared in long rolls, either rounded or lined, and filled with either minced meat, feta cheese, spinach or potato and baked at a low temperature.		
Sarıyer böreği	Sarıyer pastry	A smaller and a little fattier version of the "Kol böreği", named after Sarıyer, a district of Istanbul.		

=== Former Yugoslavia ===
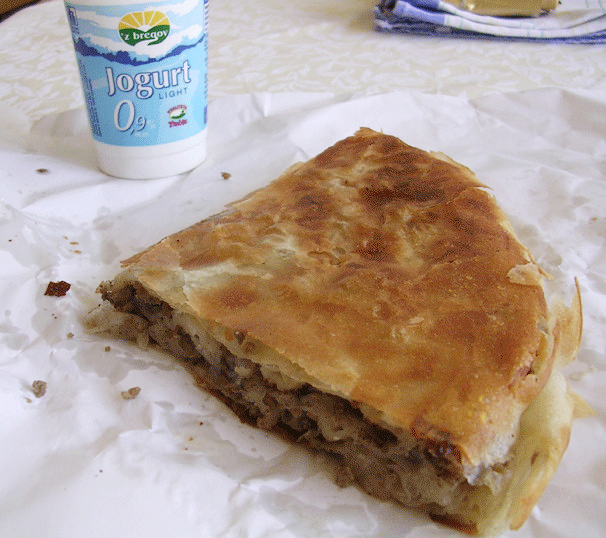
Round burek filled with minced meat as made in former Yugoslav countries

In the former Yugoslavia, burek, also known as pita in Bosnia and Herzegovina, is an extremely common dish, made with yufka. In Serbia, Albania, Kosovo, Croatia, Montenegro and North Macedonia, burek is made from layers of dough, alternating with layers of other fillings in a circular baking pan and then topped with a last layer of dough. Traditionally, it may be baked with no filling (prazan, meaning empty), with stewed minced meat and onions, or with cheese. Modern bakeries offer cheese and spinach, meat, apple, sour cherries, potato, mushroom, and other fillings. It is often eaten along with a plain yoghurt drink.

Zeljanica is a spinach or chard based burek common throughout the Balkans.

==== Bosnia and Herzegovina ====
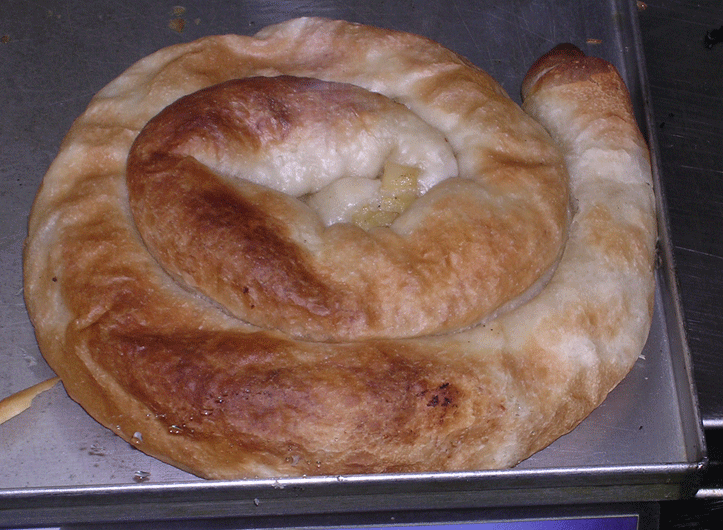
Bosnian rolled burek

In 2012, Lonely Planet included the Bosnian burek in their "The World's Best Street Food" book. Eaten for any meal of the day, in Bosnia and Herzegovina the burek is a meat-filled pastry, traditionally rolled in a spiral and cut into sections for serving. The same spiral filled with cottage cheese is called sirnica, with spinach and cheese zeljanica, with potatoes krompiruša, and all of them are generically referred to as pita. Eggs are used as a binding agent when making sirnica and zeljanica.

==== Serbia ====
The recipe for "round" burek was developed in the Serbian town of Niš. In 1498, it was introduced by a famous Turkish baker, Mehmed Oğlu, from Istanbul. Eventually burek spread from the southeast (southern Serbia, Kosovo and North Macedonia) to the rest of Yugoslavia. Niš hosts an annual burek competition and festival called Buregdžijada. In 2005, a 100 kg (220 lbs) burek was made, with a diameter of 2 metres (≈6 ft) and it is considered to have been the world's biggest burek ever made.

==== Slovenia ====
In Slovenia, burek is a recognizable and widely available fast food, particularly among students and in urban nightlife settings. While it enjoys popularity in certain contexts, it also carries complex cultural associations linked to its Balkan origins, and is not universally embraced as part of mainstream Slovenian cuisine.

=== Israel ===
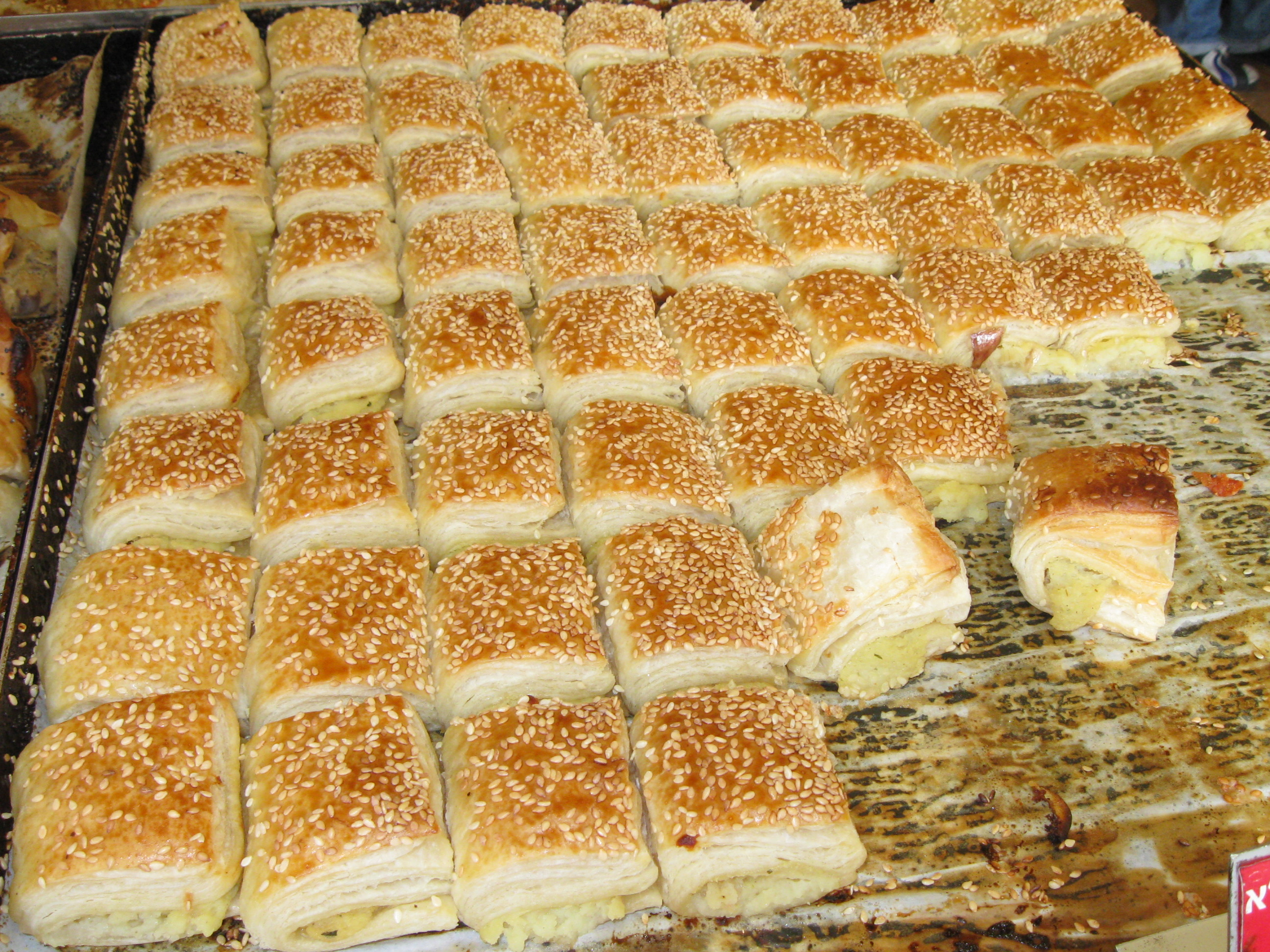
Fresh potato burekas on sale at a stall in Mahane Yehuda Market, Jerusalem

Burekas (Hebrew: בורקס) have long been part of Sephardic Jewish cuisine, ever since the migration of a large portion of that community to the Ottoman Empire following the Expulsion of Jews from Spain. The name "burekas" is the plural form of the original Balkan dish, as conjugated in Judaeo-Spanish. The name refers both to larger varieties (palm-sized or larger) and smaller varieties (originally called "Burekitas" by contrast, though the word has fallen out of use in Modern Hebrew). Burekas were later introduced to Israel by Sephardi immigrants from communities in Turkey and the Balkans during Ottoman rule. They are now sold commonly in bakeries, as well as dedicated market stalls, throughout the country.

Israeli Burkeas may be prepared with a variety of different fillings; although meat is less-commonly used because of Jewish dietary laws – specifically the prohibition against mixing milk and meat. Many types of burekas prepared and sold in Israel (particularly those that do not contain cheese) are made with Margarine-based doughs rather than butter-based doughs, in order to make them Parve – allowing them to be eaten as part of any type of meal. The most popular fillings are salty cheese (primarily Feta), spinach, eggplant and mashed potato. Other fillings include mushrooms, sweet potato, chickpeas, olives, mallows, swiss chard, and tomato sauce (known as "burekas pizza"). Burekas are traditionally offered as snacks during large gatherings and even office meetings. Multiple locally made brands and varieties of pre-made, frozen burekas (for quick baking or frying) are commonly sold in grocery stores.

Other related pastries traditionally consumed by Sephardic Jews include bulemas and boyoz, which are also popular in the Turkish city of Izmir.

=== Libya ===
It is also a popular dish in Libya, where it is known as brik.

=== Saudi Arabia ===
In Saudi Arabia, Burēk (Arabic: بُريك, Hejazi Arabic pronunciation: [bʊˈre̞ːk]), is usually made in the Hejaz region of western Saudi Arabia, it mostly resembles the Bosnian rolled burek but can also come in other variants, and it is stuffed with minced meat or with salty cheese and dill. It is usually served during the month of Ramadan, same goes to samosas.

=== Tunisia ===
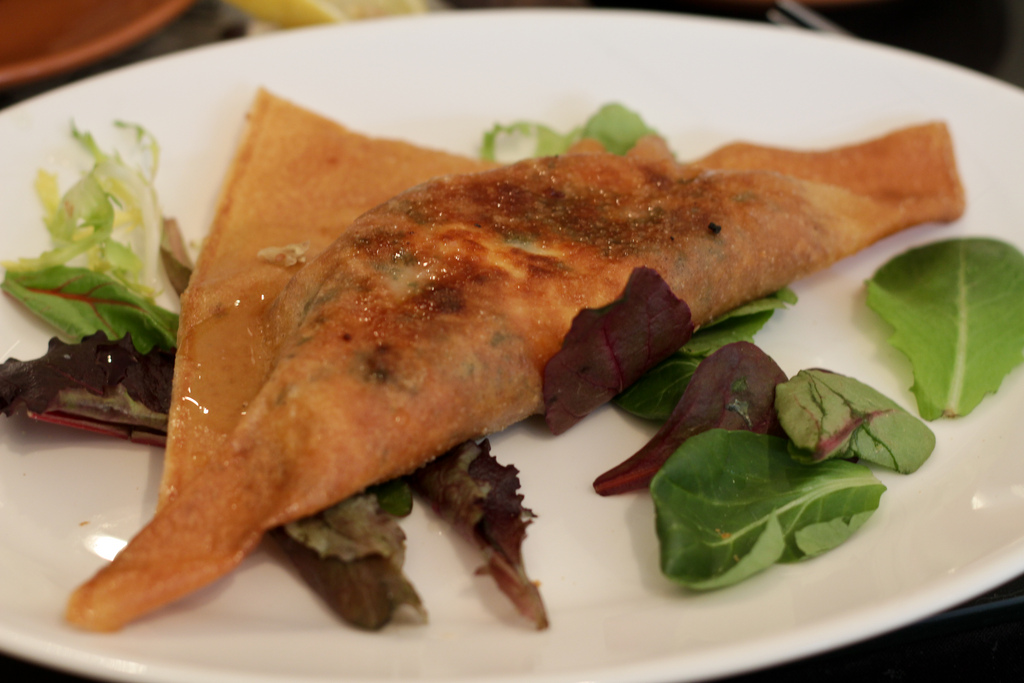
A Tunisian brik pastry

In Tunisia, there is a variant known as the brik (/briːk/ BREEK; بريك) that consists of thin crepe-like pastry around a filling and is commonly deep fried. The best-known is the egg brik, a whole egg in a triangular pastry pocket with chopped onion, tuna, harissa and parsley. The Tunisian brik is also very popular in Israel, due to the large Tunisian Jewish population there. It is often filled with a raw egg and herbs or tuna, harissa, and olives, and it is sometimes served in a pita. This is also known as a boreeka.

=== Crimean Tatar ===
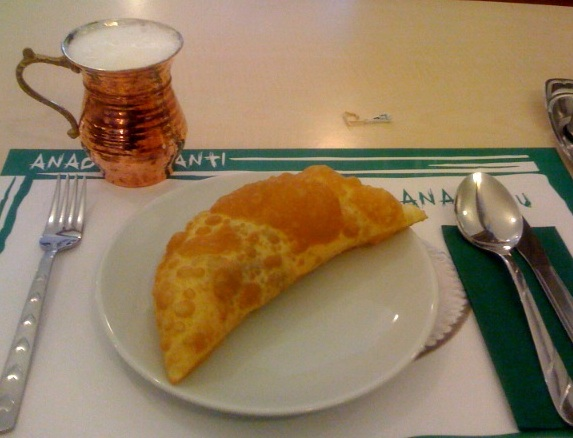
Cheburek and ayran served at a café

In Crimea, crimean tatars, a Turkic ethnic group, prepare their own varieties of burek (Crimean Tatar: börek).

The most popular variety Tatar börek variety is Cheburek (Crimean Tatar: çiberek). These are deep-fried turnovers with a filling of ground or minced meat and onions. A popular street dish, they are made with a single round piece of dough folded over the filling in a crescent shape. They have become widespread in the former Soviet-aligned countries of Eastern Europe (especially Russia), Turkey and Turkmenistan in the 20th century.

A less popular variety is Töbörek, which is essentially like cheburek, the only difference being that it is baked instead of fried.

== See also ==
- Banitsa – Southeastern European pie
- Bierock – Beef-filled pastry
- Bourekas – Filled turnover in Sephardic Jewish cuisine
- Boyoz – Turkish pastry of Sephardic Jewish origin
- Chausson aux pommes – French viennoiserie filled with applesauce
- Gibanica – Serbian dish of filo, cheese and eggs
- Khuushuur – Mongolian fried meat pastry or dumpling
- Pastel – Spanish and Portuguese word for pastry
- Pirog – Pastry of Eastern European origin
- Pirozhki – Fried/baked filled bun common in Eastern European cuisine
- Samosa – Deep-fried snack/turnover
- Zelnik – Savoury Bulgarian pastry
- List of ancient dishes and foods
- List of pastries
