= Bulemas =

Sephardic Jewish pastry

- Type: Pastry, Börek
- Place of origin: Ottoman Empire
- Associated cuisine: Sephardic Jewish cuisine
- Created by: Sephardic Jews
- Main ingredients: Flour, vegetable oil, filling (spinach, feta cheese, kashkaval)

Bulemas or boulemas, also rodanches or burmaikos, are a traditional baked pastry in Sephardic Jewish cuisine. They are made from a thinly stretched yeast dough, filled with a savory mixture, and then rolled into a spiral shape. Once baked, the pastry has a delicate and flaky texture akin to that of phyllo-based pastries, like the Turkish Kol böreği and the Greek spanakopita.

Common fillings for the dish include a spinach and cheese mix, as well as an eggplant and cheese variant.

Bulemas are often served as part of the Shabbat breakfast (dezayuno) in Sephardic Jewish communities alongside bourekas and other filled pastries, and accompanied by haminados (braised eggs), cheeses, vegetables, and raki.

== Names ==
Widely known as bulemas, this dish is called rodanches or rodanchas in Salonica and Rhodes, while among Jerusalemites, it was known as burmaikos.

In the Sephardic community of Jerusalem, burmaikos de pazi refers to the spinach version, while burmaikos de brengena refers to the eggplant variant. Burmaikos de queso features a mix of salted cheese, potato, and egg, while burmaikos de carna features gumu, a mix of minced meat, onion, and pine nuts.

== Preparation ==
Bulemas' dough is often created from basic ingredients including flour, water, vegetable oil, and a dash of salt. The dough is kneaded and then shaped into small balls, which are then coated with oil. Later, the dough balls are thinly kneaded, creating a thin sheet. To form the pastry, a small amount of the filling is placed along one edge of the sheet, which is then rolled over the filling, creating a tight cylinder. Then, one end of the cylinder is grabbed and then coiled around the center, forming the center of the spiral shape. Once the bulemas are formed, they are baked in the oven until golden brown.

Bulemas can be filled with a variety of savory ingredients. Common fillings include cheese, spinach, or eggplants, but other variations with different ingredients may also be found. In several communities, a unique variation of bulemas (rodanches de kalavasa), which features a special pumpkin or butternut filling, holds a traditional place on the table during Rosh HaShanah and Sukkot celebrations.

== See also ==
- Bourekas
- Boyoz
- Kol böreği
- Spanakopita
