= Peinirli =

Turkish pie

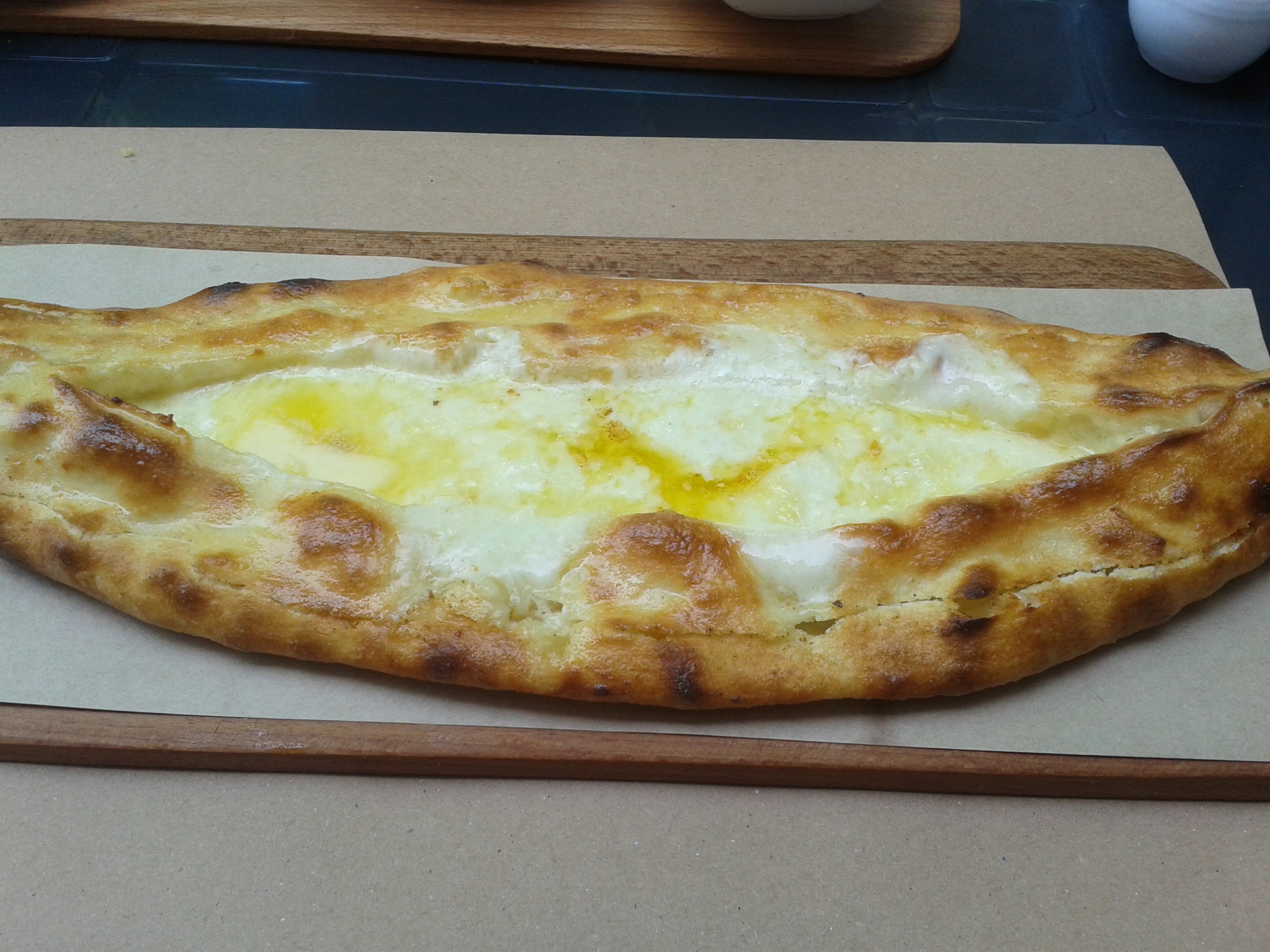
Black Sea-style peynirli pide in an Ankara restaurant

The peinirli (or peinirli) is an elongated, open pie made in a boat shape. They contain a substantial amount of yellow cheese and optionally, meats or vegetables. Peinirli originated in Turkey, where it is known as peynirli pide. There are two types of pide: peynirli pide, in which cheese entirely covers the surface of the filling and karışık pide, which has cheese only as part of the filling (usually one third).

== Etymology ==
"Peinirli", meaning with cheese, comes from the Turkish roots peynir ("cheese") + -li ("full"). The suffix -li is also used for ingredients, such as kıymalı ("with minced meat"), pastırmalı ("with pastirma"), or ıspanaklı ("with spinach").

== See also ==
- Turkish cuisine
- İçli pide
- Khachapuri
- Burek
- Banitsa
- Pastrmajlija
- Tiropita
