= Pepitada =

Beverage consumed by Sephardic Jews in the Eastern Mediterranean

Pepitada is a beverage traditionally consumed by Sephardic Jews in parts of the Eastern Mediterranean, including Greece, Bulgaria, and Turkey, Egypt and the Levant, as a way to break the Yom Kippur fast. Prepared from toasted melon seeds, it is a sweet, milky beverage.

== Etymology ==
In Ladino, "pepita" translates to "pip" or "little seed," while the suffix "ada" serves a similar function to the English suffix "ade."

== Cultural significance ==
In the Eastern Mediterranean, such as in Greece (Rhodes, Crete), Bulgaria, and Turkey, Sephardic Jews traditionally consume pepitada as a way to conclude the Yom Kippur fast, and sometimes after the Tisha B'Av fast. According to Gil Marks in the Encyclopedia of Jewish Food, the whiteness of pepitada symbolizes purity, making it particularly suitable for High Holy Days. Traditionally, pepitada is served in small glasses after the fast. Sephardic Jews believe the beverage coats the stomach, enhancing food digestibility. In contrast to Ashkenazi Jews, who usually break their fasts with dairy foods, Sephardim have historically started with pareve items like pepitada, followed by a light meal of pastries, cookies, and/or fresh fruit, often concluding with a meat dish or fried fish.

Beyond its cultural significance, pepitada is valued for its restorative qualities, providing a refreshing effect after a period of fasting. In Food: A Culinary History, Jean-Louis Flandrin described pepitada as a "type of orgeat made with the flesh of melon seeds" and noted that its "refreshing character" made it appropriate for the summer heat. In modern times, with melons available year-round, some families prepare pepitada throughout the summer as a refreshing beverage.

== Preparation and taste profile ==
The primary ingredients for pepitada are the seeds of sweet melons, such as cantaloupe or honeydew. The preparation process involves several steps. First, the seeds are scooped from the melons, washed, and allowed to dry for about two days. Next, the dried seeds are toasted in an oven until they reach a golden brown color. After toasting, the seeds are blended with water and left to steep in the refrigerator for 24 hours. Following the steeping process, the mixture is strained through cheesecloth to extract the liquid. Finally, the resulting liquid is sweetened with honey and flavored with a few drops of rosewater or orange blossom water.

Pepitada's predominant flavors are toasted and nutty. The beverage typically has a milky appearance, dotted with tiny oil droplets from the seeds, and is consumed chilled or at room temperature. Pepitada has been compared to horchata and is similar to the Turkish beverage sübye and the almond-based Greek beverage known as soumada or soumatha.

== See also ==
- Sephardic Jewish cuisine
