= Biscochos =

Sephardi Jewish cookie

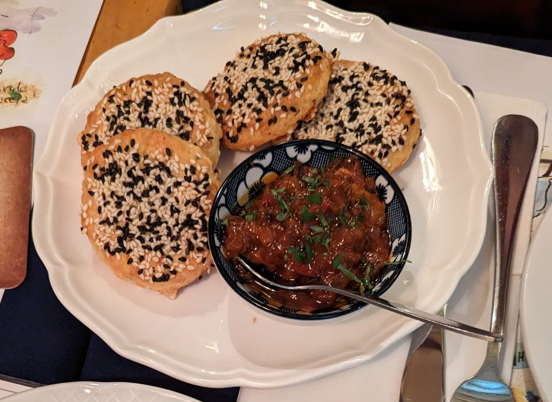
Savory bisochos served with salatakucha in Jerusalem

Biscochos, also known as biscochos de huevo, or biscotios, are a traditional Sephardi Jewish ring-shaped cookie commonly prepared for Hanukkah, Purim, and other Jewish holidays.

== Overview ==
Biscochos is small, ring-shaped, twice-baked cookie with a crisp texture, similar to an abadi cookie, with a dough typically containing flour, oil, sugar, orange juice, vanilla, or anise extract. The cookies are often topped with either cinnamon sugar or coated with an egg wash and topped with sesame seeds.

== History ==
Biscochos originated in the Sephardi Jewish community of Spain, and after the Inquisition in the 15th century, biscochos migrated with the surviving Sephardi Jews fleeing Spain to the Maghreb, the Middle East, and Turkey. With the arrival of Sephardi Jews to the United States, as well as the expulsion of Sephardim from Middle Eastern countries in 1949, and their subsequent refuge in Israel; biscochos are now more commonly found in these two countries.

== Preparation ==
According to Jonathan Arogeti, who bakes biscochos at his synagogue in Atlanta, Georgia, "The dough needs to be rolled out pencil thin before it is twisted and made into the signature circle shape. The older generation always checks and makes sure that each strand of dough is not too thick."

== Popularity ==
Biscochos are popular among those in the Sephardi Jewish community, and are most frequently consumed during Hanukkah and Purim, among other Jewish holidays.

=== In the United States ===
Biscochos de huevo are prepared by Sephardic Jewish Americans for special occasions and holidays. Congregants of the Or VeShalom Congregation, a Sephardi synagogue in Atlanta, Georgia, prepare biscochos for the synagogue's "Hanukkah Bazaar", an annual event which has been hosted by the synagogue since 1972. The event celebrates Hanukkah and offers various Sephardi cookies, pastries, and other baked goods baked by their congregation. Or VeShalom's variant of this cookie is topped with cinnamon sugar.

== See also ==
- Ma'amoul
- Hamantash
- Abadi cookie
- Sephardi Jewish cuisine
