= Sephardic Jewish cuisine =

Assortment of cooking traditions of Sephardic Jews

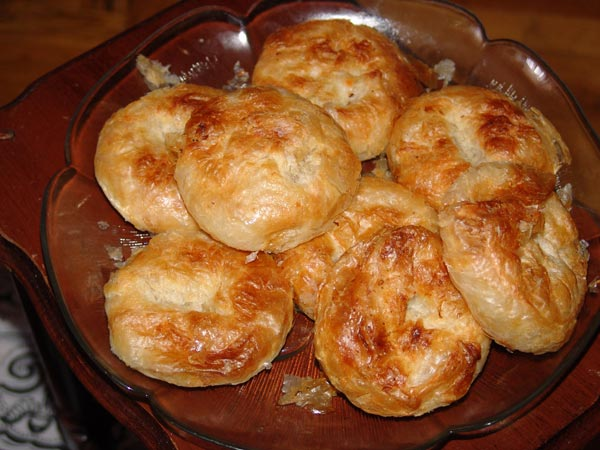
Boyoz pastry, a regional specialty of İzmir, Turkey introduced to Ottoman cuisine by the Sephardim

Sephardic Jewish cuisine, belonging to the Sephardic Jews—descendants of the Jewish population of the Iberian Peninsula until their expulsion in 1492—encompasses traditional dishes developed as they resettled in the Ottoman Empire, North Africa, and the Mediterranean, including Jewish communities in Turkey, Greece, Bulgaria, North Macedonia, and Syria, as well as the Sephardic community in the Land of Israel. It may also refer to the culinary traditions of the Western Sephardim, who settled in The Netherlands, England, and from these places elsewhere. The cuisine of Jerusalem, in particular, is considered predominantly Sephardic.

Sephardic Jewish cuisine preserves medieval traditions while also incorporating dishes developed in the regions where Sephardic Jews resettled after the expulsion. Notable dishes include bourekas (savory pastries), eggplant-based dishes, medias (halved vegetables filled with meat or cheese and cooked in tomato sauce), stuffed vegetables, agristada (a sour sauce), tishpishti (a semolina and nuts cake), baklava, and cookies such as biscochos and qurbayel. Many of these dishes' names originate from Judaeo-Spanish, Turkish, and Greek, the main languages spoken by Sephardic Jews in the diaspora.

As with other Jewish ethnic divisions composing the Jewish Diaspora, Sephardim cooked foods that were popular in their countries of residence, adapting them to Jewish religious dietary requirements, kashrut. Their choice of foods was also determined by economic factors, with many of the dishes based on inexpensive and readily available ingredients.

== Terminology ==
Sephardi Jews are the Jews of the Iberian Peninsula, who were expelled or forced to convert to Christianity in 1492. Many of those expelled settled in North-African Berber and Arabic-speaking countries, such as Morocco, Tunisia, Algeria and Libya, becoming the North African Sephardim. Those who settled in Greece, Turkey, the Balkans, Syria, the Lebanon and the Holy Land became the Eastern Sephardim. The Western Sephardim, also known more ambiguously as the Spanish and Portuguese Jews, left Spain and Portugal as New Christians in a steady stream over the next few centuries, and converted back to Judaism once in The Netherlands, England, etc.

While the pre-existing Jews of the countries in which they settled (in the Greater Middle East, for example, are called Mizrahim) are distinct, the term Sephardi as used in "Sephardi cuisine" would refer only to the culinary traditions of those Jews with ancestral origins to the Jews of Spain and Portugal. Both the Jews of the Iberian Peninsula and the pre-existing Jews of Morocco, Tunisia, Algeria, Bulgaria, Turkey, Syria, Egypt, Italy, and Greece into whose communities they settled adapted local dishes to the constraints of the kosher dietary laws.

Since the establishment of a Jewish state and the convergence of Jews from all the globe in Israel, these local cuisines, with all their differences, have come to represent the collection of culinary traditions broadly known as Sephardi cuisine.

== History ==
=== Medieval Spain ===
Prior to their expulsion in 1492, Sephardic Jews enjoyed a vibrant cultural life in medieval Spain, marked by their integration into both Muslim and Christian societies while maintaining a distinct Jewish identity and developing a rich Jewish culture of their own. This period saw the development of a well-established culinary tradition that not only reflected the broader food culture of medieval Spain but also featured ingredients like eggplant, chard, and chickpeas, which became closely associated with Jews in this area.

The Kitāb al-Ṭabikh, a cookbook composed in Al-Andalus during the 12th or 13th centuries, includes six explicitly Jewish recipes. It also features an early version of mofletta, a sweet pancake dish still enjoyed by Sephardic Moroccan Jews during Mimouna, as well as a possibly early version of challah bread, which may have traveled with Jews from Spain to Central Europe and subsequently influenced Ashkenazi cuisine.

=== Post-expulsion Ottoman Empire ===
Sephardic Jewish cuisine underwent significant changes following the expulsion of Jews from Spain in 1492, representing a pivotal moment for Sephardic Jews, who were faced with the choice of converting to Christianity or fleeing their homes. Many resettled across the Mediterranean, with a significant number finding refuge in the Ottoman Empire. This migration posed considerable challenges, including the disruption of established communal structures and institutions. According to Sara Gardner, during this period, Sephardic women played a crucial role in preserving cultural identity, especially as communal institutions collapsed. The domestic sphere, traditionally overseen by women, became the focal point for maintaining religious and cultural practices, including culinary traditions.

Upon their settlement in the Ottoman Empire, Sephardic Jews began the process of recreating their Spanish culinary heritage despite the lack of familiar ingredients and cooking methods. Sephardic women were instrumental in this process, modifying their recipes to incorporate new local ingredients while maintaining traditional dishes. Foods such as adafina, a traditional Shabbat stew; almodrote, a casserole made with eggplant and cheese; and biscochos, cakes made with ground nuts and eggs—once used to identify crypto-Jews in Spain during the Spanish Inquisition—were reintroduced in their new Ottoman homes.

The integration of Sephardic Jews into Ottoman society led to a fusion of Sephardic and Ottoman culinary styles. Sephardic women adapted local ingredients and techniques, resulting in the creation of new dishes such as tishpishti, a semolina cake soaked in syrup, and pishkado ahilado, a stew of fried fish with tomato sauce. Other ingredients known from Spain were also available in the new home. Eggplant, a key ingredient associated with Jews in Spain, remained a hallmark of Sephardic cuisine in the Ottoman Empire. The classic Judaeo-Spanish koplas song "Siete modos de gizar la berendgena" (Note: Also "los guisados de las berenjenas") lists various methods of preparing eggplant popular among Jews in Ottoman lands, alongside several eggplant dishes influenced by local cuisine. The incorporation of Ottoman culinary methods, such as the use of filo pastry, facilitated innovations such as bourekas. This adaptation illustrates the evolution of Sephardic cuisine within its new context, while retaining elements from its Iberian origins and reflecting both continuity and change across the Mediterranean.

=== In the New World ===
Sephardic Jews also settled in various regions worldwide, developing distinct cuisines influenced by local ingredients and cooking methods. For instance, some Jews who fled the Inquisition in the 15th century settled in Recife, Brazil, where their cuisine incorporated local ingredients such as molasses, rum, sugar, vanilla, chocolate, bell peppers, maize, tomatoes, kidney beans, string beans, and turkey. In 1654, 23 Sephardic Jews arrived in New Amsterdam (present-day New York) bringing this cuisine with them to the early colonial United States. Early American Jewish cuisine was heavily influenced by this branch of Sephardic cuisine. Many of the recipes were bound up in observance of traditional holidays and remained true to their origins. These included dishes such as stew and fish fried in olive oil, beef and bean stews, almond puddings, and egg custards. The first kosher cookbook in America was the Jewish Cookery Book by Esther Levy which was published in 1871 in Philadelphia and includes many of the traditional recipes.

=== Contemporary Jerusalem ===
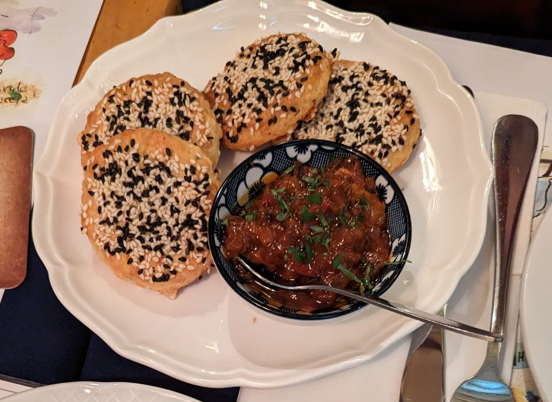
Savory bisochos served with salatakucha in Jerusalem

Sephardic Jews arriving in Jerusalem from Ottoman lands during the 17th and 18th centuries introduced their cuisine to the city. Consequently, the cuisine of Jerusalem is predominantly Sephardic, featuring dishes such as slow-cooked meat stews, stuffed vegetables, and a variety of savory pastries, including pastelitos, borekitas, and biscochos. This cuisine has also integrated with other local culinary traditions, incorporating elements from Levantine Arab, Ashkenazi, and Kurdish Jewish practices.

== Cuisine basics ==
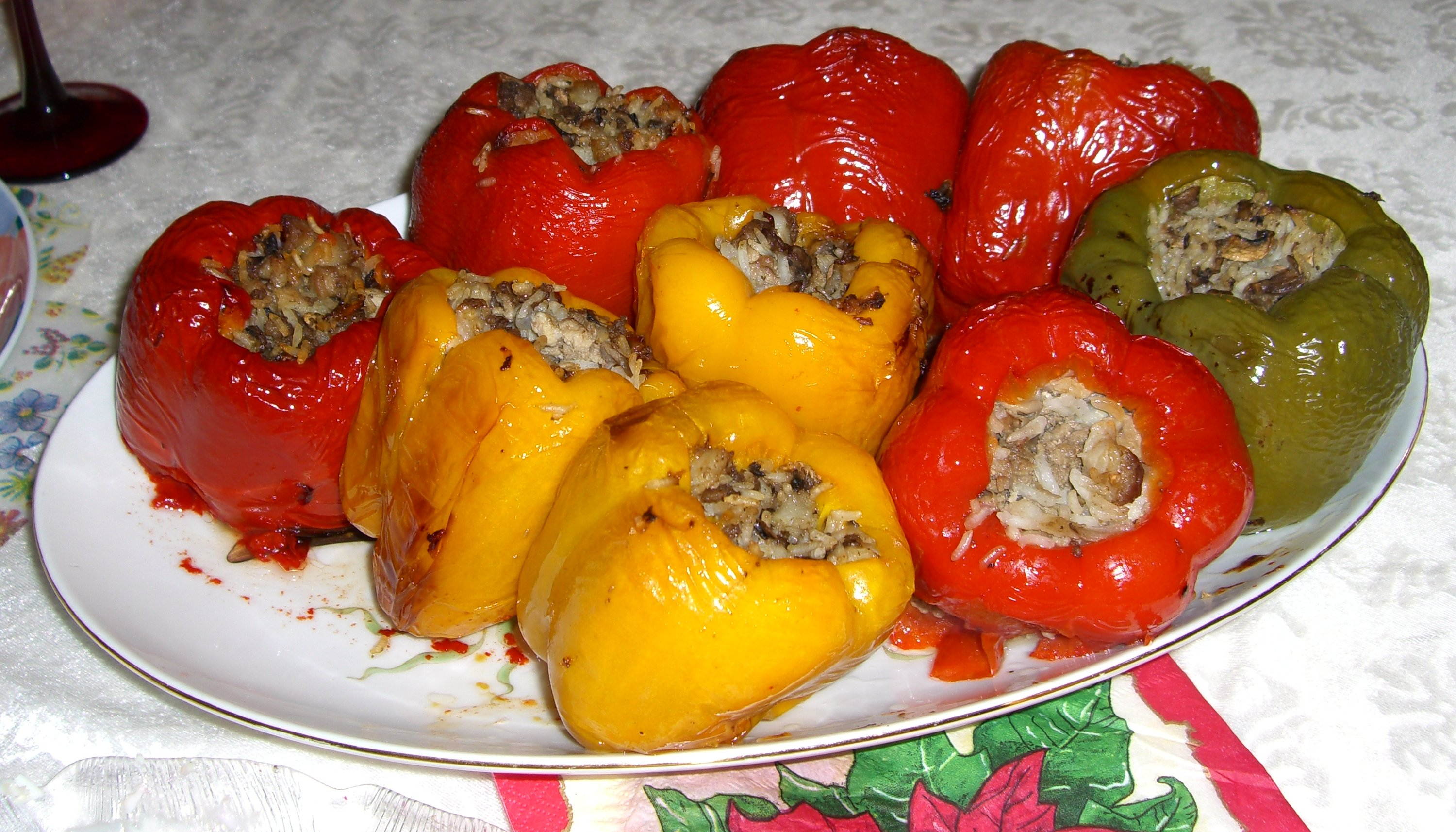
Rice-stuffed peppers (in Hebrew "memolaim")

Sephardi cuisine emphasizes salads, stuffed vegetables and vine leaves, olive oil, lentils, fresh and dried fruits, herbs and nuts, and chickpeas. Meat dishes often make use of lamb or ground beef.

Fresh lemon juice is added to many soups and sauces. Many meat and rice dishes incorporate dried fruits such as apricots, prunes and raisins. Pine nuts are used as a garnish.

=== Herbs and spices ===
In the early days, Sephardic cuisine was influenced by the local cuisines of Spain and Portugal, both under Catholic and Islamic regimes. A particular affinity to exotic foods from outside of Spain became apparent under Muslim rule, as evidenced even today with ingredients brought in by the Muslims.

Cumin, cilantro, and turmeric are very common in Sephardi cooking. Caraway and capers were brought to Spain by the Muslims and are featured in the cuisine. Cardamom (hel) is used to flavor coffee. Chopped fresh cilantro and parsley are popular garnishes. Chopped mint is added to salads and cooked dishes, and fresh mint leaves (nana) are served in tea. Cinnamon is sometimes used as a meat seasoning, especially in dishes made with ground meat. Saffron, which is grown in Spain, is used in many varieties of Sephardic cooking, as well as spices found in the areas where they have settled.

=== Desserts and beverages ===
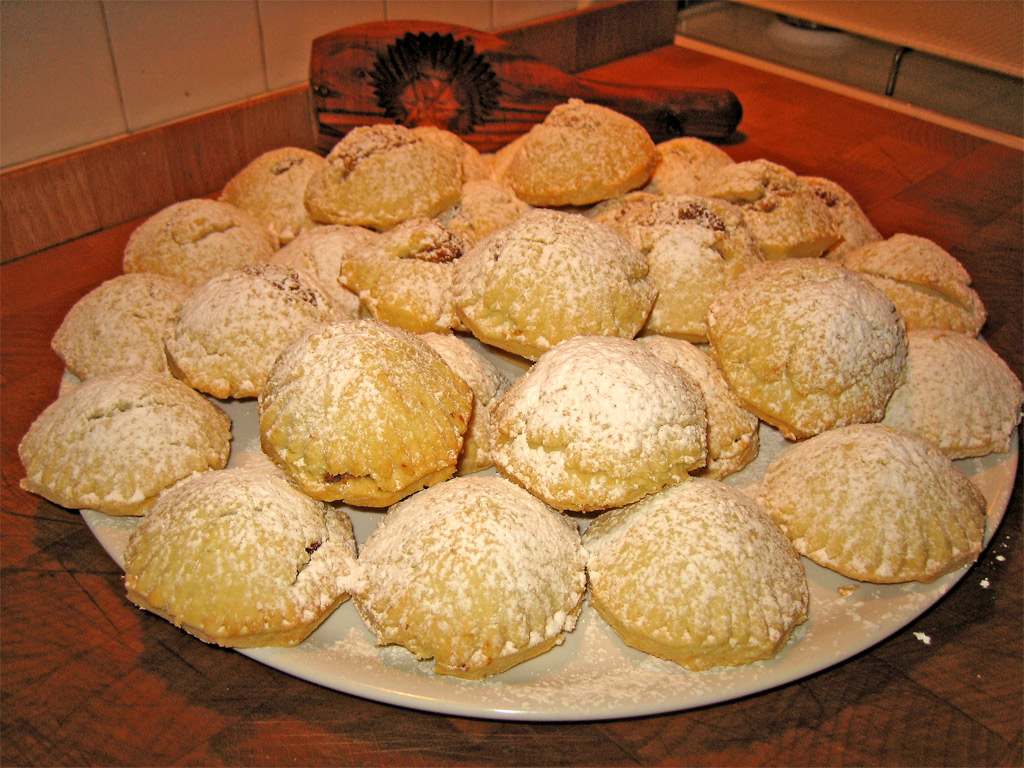
Date-filled ma'amoul

Tiny cups of Turkish coffee, sometimes spiced with cardamom, are often served at the end of a festive meal, accompanied by small portions of baklava or other pastries dipped in syrup or honey. Hot sahlab, a liquidy cornstarch pudding originally flavored with orchid powder (today invariably replaced by artificial flavorings), is served in cups as a winter drink, garnished with cinnamon, nuts, coconut and raisins. Arak is the preferred alcoholic beverage. Rose water is a common ingredient in cakes and desserts. Malabi, a cold cornstarch pudding, is sprinkled with rose water and red syrup.

== Shabbat and holiday dishes ==
=== Shabbat ===
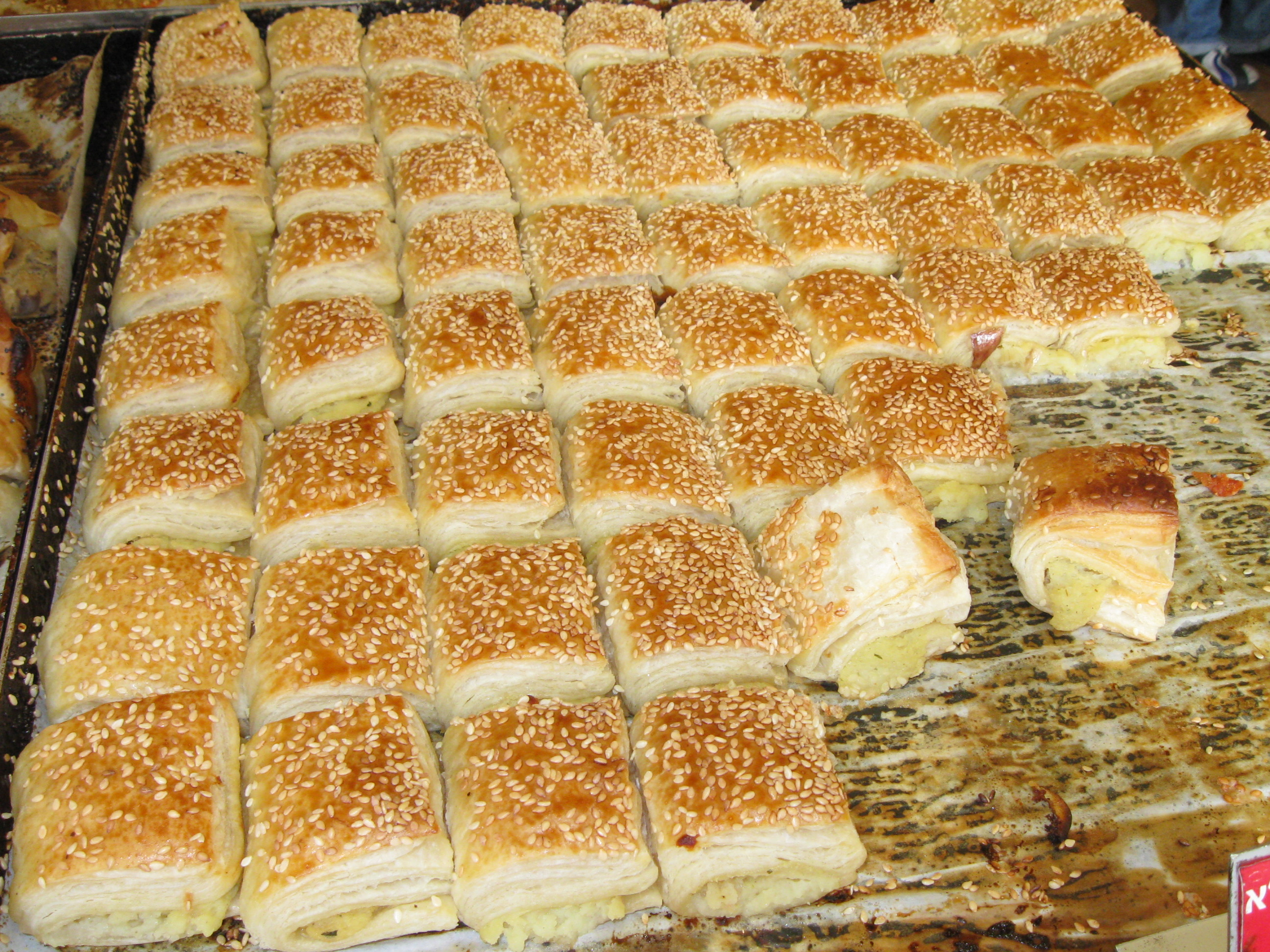
Potato Bourekas at Mahane Yehuda Market, Jerusalem

As cooking on Shabbat is prohibited, Sephardi Jews, like their Ashkenazi counterparts, developed slow-cooked foods that would simmer on a low flame overnight and be ready for eating the next day.

One slow-cooked food was ropa vieja. The oldest name of the dish is chamin (from the Hebrew word "cham," which means "hot"), but there are several other names. When the Sephardic Jews were expelled from Spain in 1492, many fled to northwestern Africa across the Straits of Gibraltar. The hamin was changed, adjusting for local ingredients and then called dafina ("covered") in Morocco. Any favorite vegetables can be added, and the eggs can be removed and eaten at any time. Its Ashkenazi counterpart is called shalet or cholent.

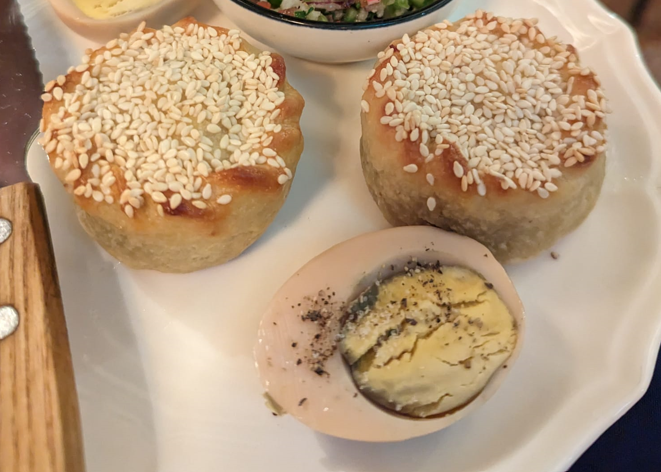
Pastelitos, meat-stuff pastries, served with boiled egg in Jerusalem

Shavfka is another Sephardi dish that has an Ashkenazi counterpart, namely kugel. Bourekas and bulemas are often served on Shabbat morning. Pestelas and Pastelikos, sesame-topped pastry filled with pine nuts, meat and onion, are also traditionally eaten on the same time.

Sambusak is a semicircular pocket of dough filled with mashed chickpeas, fried onions and spices associated with Sephardic Jewish cuisine. According to Gil Marks, an Israeli food historian, sambusak has been a traditional part of the Sephardic Sabbath meal since the 13th century.

=== Rosh Hashana ===
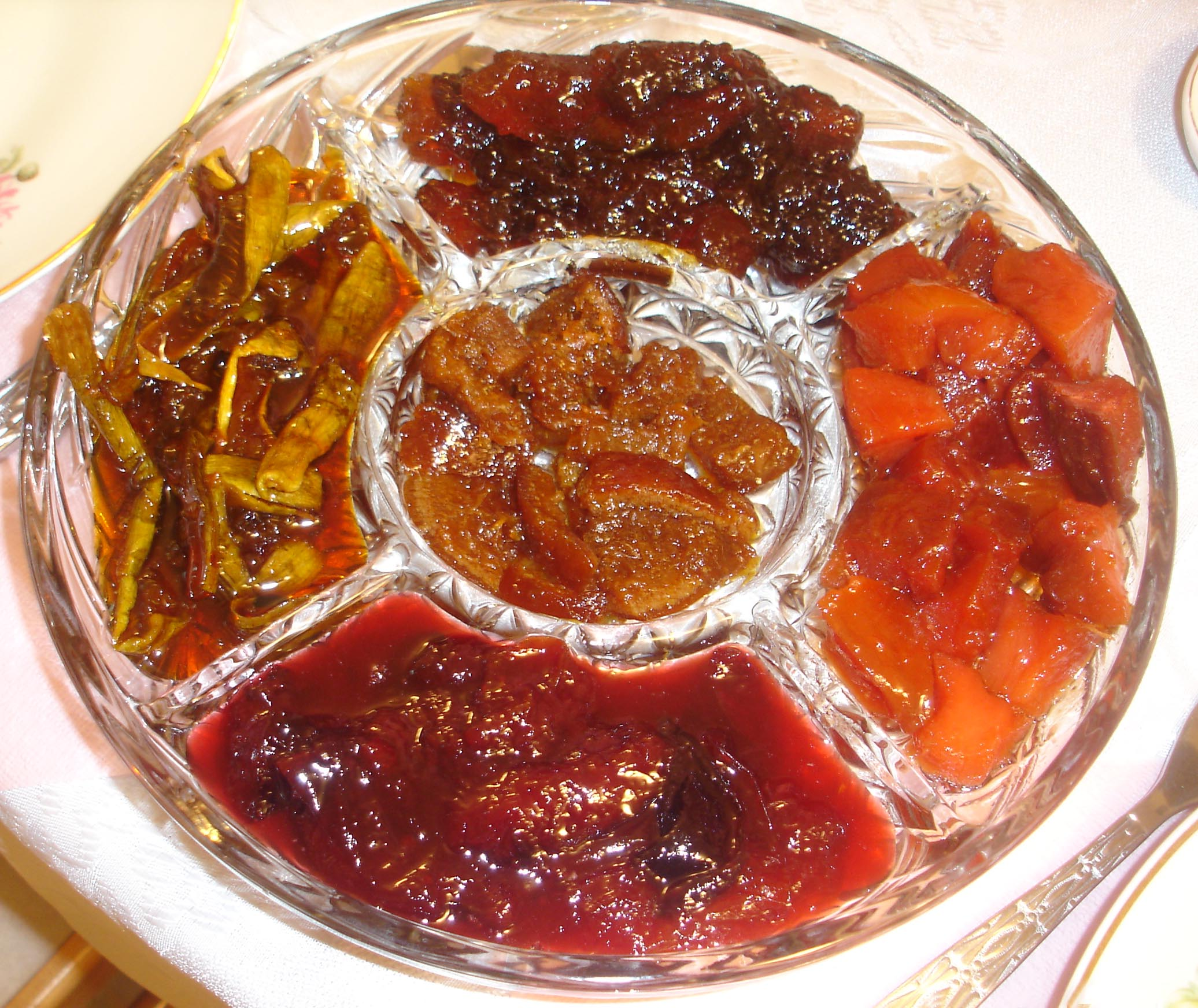
Libyan Jewish fruit preserves for Rosh Hashana

At the beginning of the evening meals of Rosh Hashana, it is traditional to eat foods symbolic of a good year and to recite a short prayer beginning with the Hebrew words yehi ratson ("May it be Your will") over each one, with the name of the food in Hebrew or Aramaic often presenting a play on words. The foods eaten at this time have thus become known as yehi ratsones.

Typical foods, often served on a large platter called a yehi ratson platter, include:

- Apples dipped in honey, or baked or sometimes in the form of a compote called mansanada
- Dates
- Pomegranates, or black-eyed peas
- Pumpkin, in the form of savory pumpkin-filled pastries called rodanchas
- Leeks, in the form of fritters called keftedes de prasa
- Beets, usually peeled and baked
- Head of a fish, usually a fish course with a whole fish, head intact

It is also common to symbolize a year filled with blessings by eating foods with stuffing on Rosh Hashana such as a stuffed, roasted bird or a variety of stuffed vegetables called legumbres yaprakes.

=== Hanukkah ===
Sephardic Hanukkah dishes include cassola (sweet cheese pancakes), bimuelos (puffed fritters with an orange glaze), keftes de espinaka (spinach patties), keftes de prasa (leek patties) and shamlias (fried pastry frills).

=== Passover ===
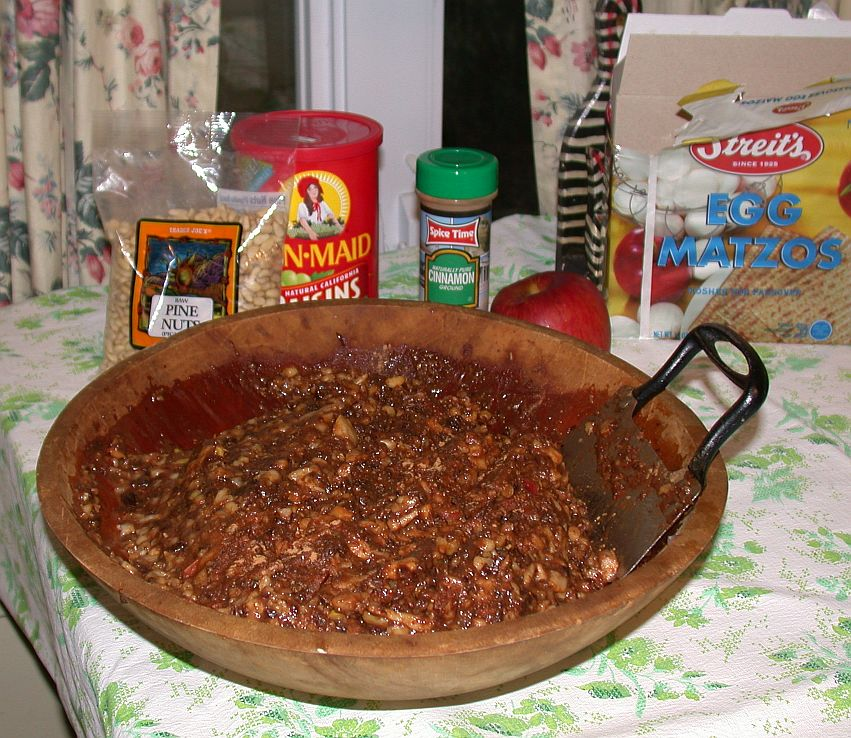
Charoset

Sephardi and Ashkenazi cooking differs substantially on Passover due to rabbinic rulings that allow the consumption of kitniyot, a category which is forbidden to Ashkenazi Jews. Sephardi Jews prepare charoset, one of the symbolic foods eaten at the Passover seder, from different ingredients. Whereas charoset in Ashkenazi homes is a blend of chopped apples and nuts spiced with wine and cinnamon, Sephardi charoset is based on raisins or dates and is generally much thicker in consistency.

Mina (known as scacchi in Italy) is a Passover meat or vegetable pie made with a matzo crust.

=== Shavuot ===
A challah bread traditionally made for Shavuot by Sephardic women is siete cielos, meaning "seven heavens" in Ladino. The name refers to the belief that seven celestial spheres opened when the Ten Commandments were given. The siete cielos bread has a central orb representing Mount Sinai surrounded by seven dough rings symbolising the seven heavens. These rings are adorned with small dough sculptures, including representations of Miriam's well, the Ten Commandments, an open Torah scroll, a dove symbolising the Jewish people, and the copper serpent stick created by Moses as a sign for repentance and healing.

== Food in Sephardic popular culture ==
Michal Held Delaroza documented several food-related sayings from the old Sephardic Jewish community of Jerusalem. One such saying was: "The holidays of the Christians are in the fields, the holidays of the Muslims are in the tombs, and the holidays of the Jews are in the pots" (Arabic: أعياد المسيحيين بالظهور، أعياد المسلمين بالقبور، أعياد اليهود بالقدور, romanized: A'yad al-Masihiyyin bil-zuhur, a'yad al-Muslimin bil-qubur, a'yad al-Yahud bil-qudur)

Another saying was: El mundo es un bizcocho, ke ayen ke lo kome crudo, ke ayen ke lo kome kocho, which means: "The world is a cake; those who want to eat it raw, let them eat it raw; those who want to eat it cooked, let them eat it cooked." Additionally, the phrase "despues de Purim, platicos" (after Purim, a mishloach manot) serves as a metaphor for something done when it already had no value or significance.

== Other specialities ==
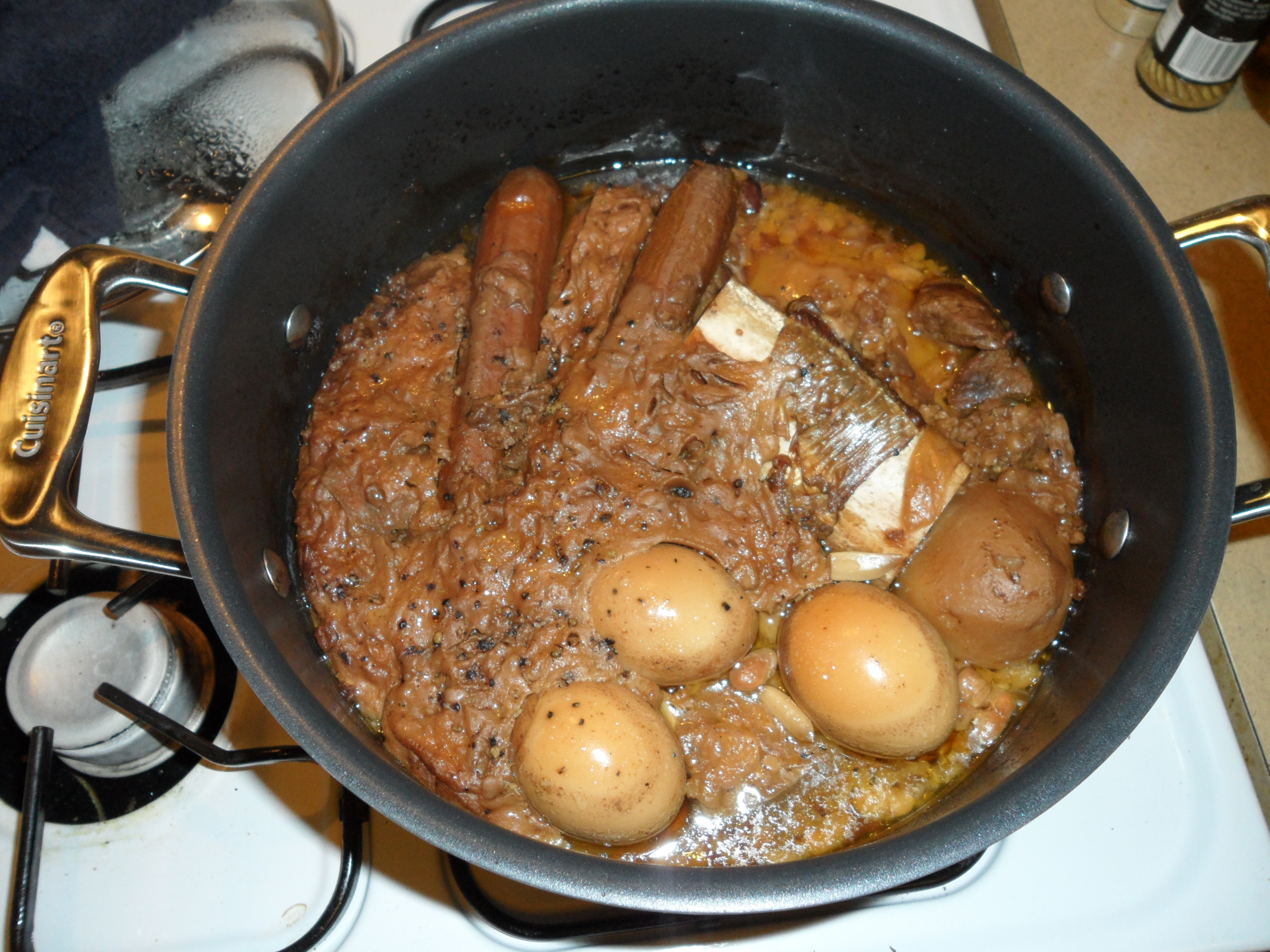
Haminados eggs in hamin stew

- Almadrote—an oil, garlic and cheese sauce served with eggplant casserole
- Baba ghanoush—mashed cooked eggplant, olive oil, lemon juice, various seasonings, and sometimes tahini
- Baklava—a layered dessert made of filo pastry, filled with chopped nuts, and sweetened with syrup or honey
- Börekitas—small borekas with eggplant, spinach and cheese
- Fazuelos—fried dough formed into a spiral shape
- Haminados—hard-boiled eggs braised over many hours, turning brown in the course of all-night cooking
- Malabi—a milk pudding whose basic ingredients are rice, sugar, rice flour and milk
- Moussaka—an eggplant- and/or potato-based dish, often including ground meat
- Pastel di carne con masa fina
- Pescado frito—a traditional Shabbat fish dish (usually cod) for 16th-century Andalusian Jews of Spain and Portugal, from this dish originates the fish and chips first brought to the United Kingdom by Portuguese Jewish immigrants.
- Sahlab—a hot milk-based winter drink with a pudding-like consistency, possibly containing powder from near-extinct orchids, sometimes garnished with nuts and cinnamon
- Sarma—blanched cabbage leaves wrapped around minced meat and simmered in tomato sauce
- Sofrito—a meat (lamb, beef, chicken) stew sautéed with potatoes, garlic, turmeric, and cardamom
- Yaprak—stuffed grape leaves
- Panjas - A passover dish from the Levant region that consist on lemon-garlic flavored patties wrapped around gundelia stems.
- Pepitada- A drink consisting of fermented dried melon seeds with the addition of sugar and orange blossom water, served for erev Yom Kippur.

== See also ==
- Jewish cuisine
- Cuisine of the Ashkenazi Jews
- Cuisine of the Mizrahi Jews
- Spanish cuisine
- Portuguese cuisine
