= Almadroc =

Garlic-cheese sauce

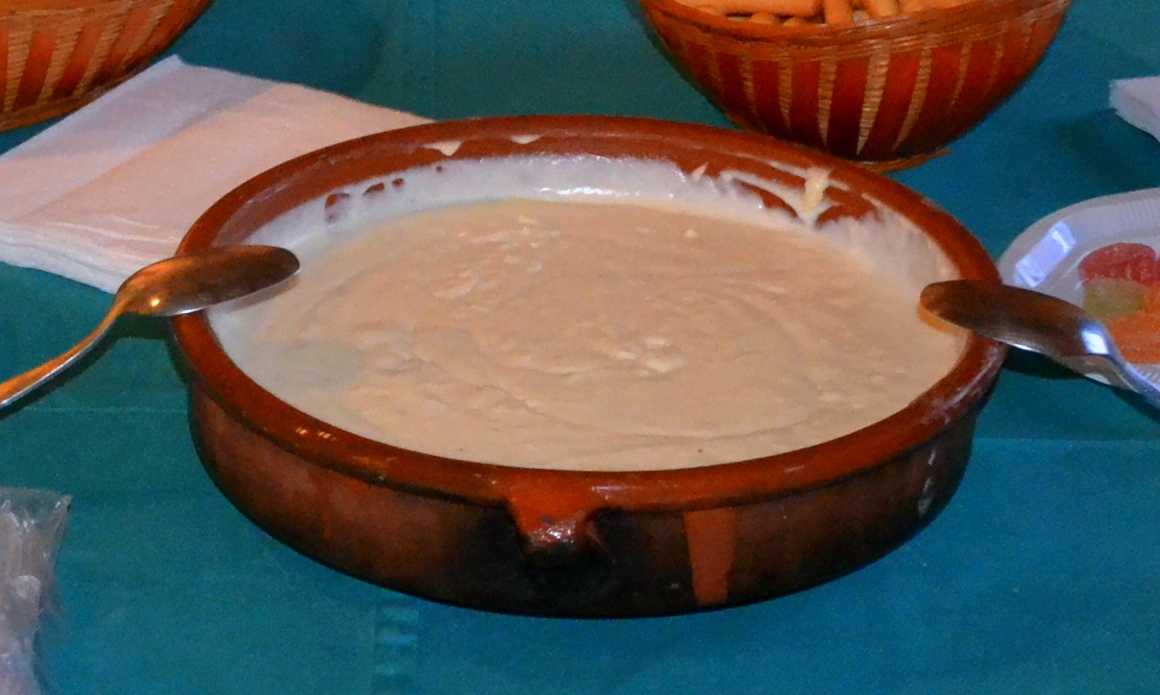
A bowl of almadroc

Almadroc is a garlic-cheese sauce from medieval Catalan cuisine from the Llibre de Sent Soví. There is a similar recipe in the Llibre del Coch by Rupert de Nola for almadrote, a sauce made with garlic, eggs, cheese and broth that was served with partridge. In modern usage it refers to an oil, garlic and cheese sauce served with eggplant casserole. Almadrote may have pre-Inquisition Sephardic origins and served with eggplant has become widespread in modern Turkish cuisine.

Earlier recipes for almodrote may date recipes for a type of green sauce called moretum (believed to be the etymological origin of almodrote) in the Apicius, or it may be of Arabic etymology. Concerning the latter, the evidence is based on modern lexicographical studies; it is not used for any of the sauces found in the 13th-century Andalusian cookbook, but may be derived from the Arabic term almaṭrúq meaning to pound.

During the Inquisition in the late 15th-century Fray Gonçalo Bringuylla was reported to have eaten "eggplant with almadrote".

In a later 16th-century cookbook the name of the sauce is altered to capirotada, though garlic is only present in one variation of the sauce. Modern Sephardic cookbooks commonly contain recipes for vegetable casseroles with almodrot and almodrote. These recipes may include white cheese or feta, sometimes combined with a firmer cheese like Gruyère, and eggs to thicken the sauce.
