= Almond pudding =

Milk pudding or custard

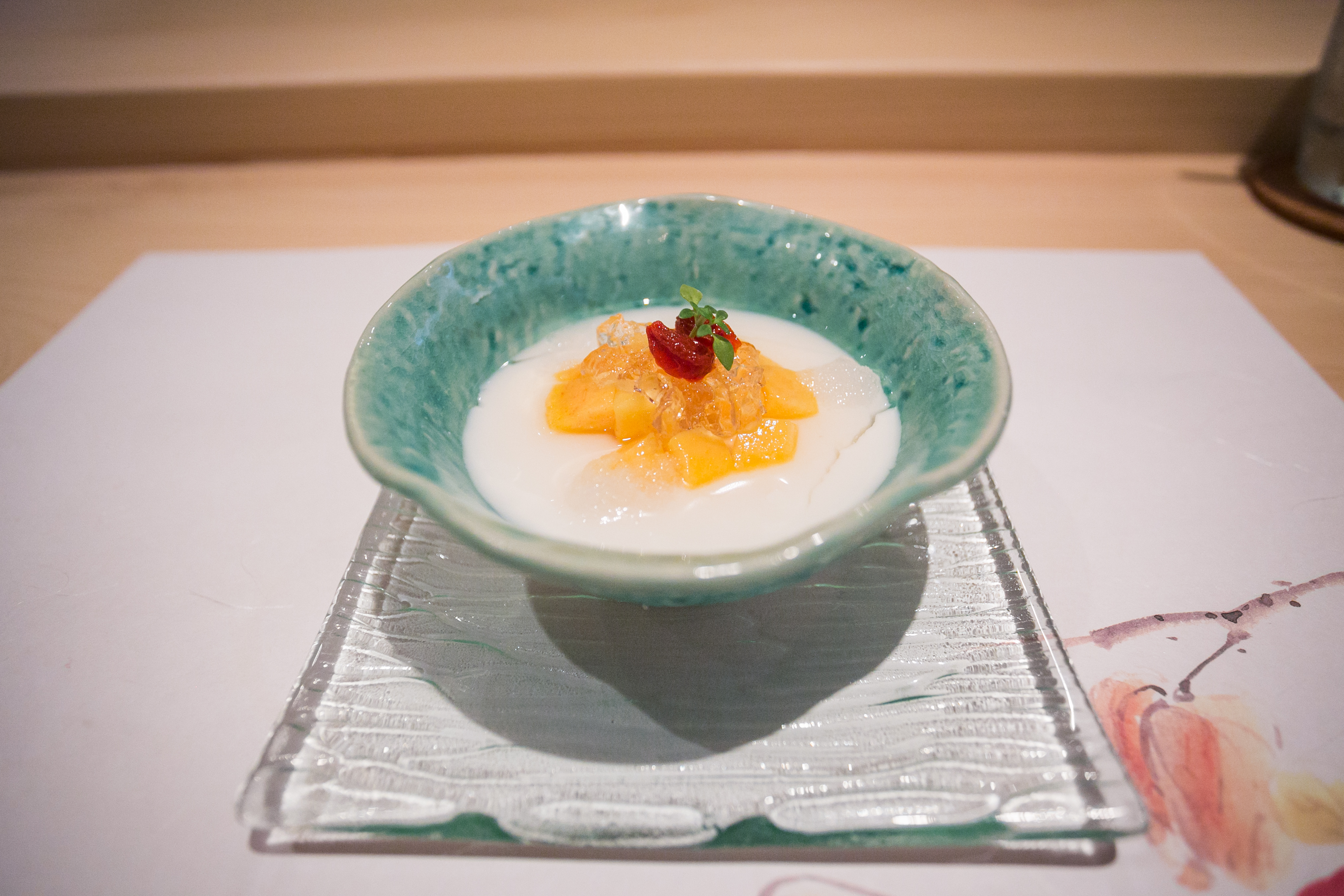
Almond pudding

Almond pudding is a milk pudding or custard thickened with ground almonds and sometimes flavored with almond extract. There are versions of almond pudding found in the Arab cuisines of the Middle East, and variations of this dish are found in American, European, Turkish, Persian, Indian, Chinese, and other world cuisines.

== American cuisine ==
Almond pudding recipes are known in American cookbooks starting with Amelia Simmons, whose American Cookery (1796) is the first known cookbook written by an American. Her recipe is for a boiled pudding that she calls a "cream almong pudding", with eggs, nutmeg and cream. The pudding is boiled in cloth and served with melted butter and sugar.

== British cuisine ==
Ipswich almond pudding is a recipe that appears in the 18th century cookbook The Art of Cookery by Hannah Glasse. It's a sort of bread pudding thickened with blanched almonds and baked in puff pastry. Elizabeth Moxon also uses balanced almonds to thicken bread pudding, that can be made with butter, suet or marrow and baked in "little tins". In one version of the pudding Moxon omits rose water and orange flower water, adding cinnamon and a little lemon peel instead. A sauce can be made for the pudding with wine and sugar.

A recipe for egg and cream custard thickened with ground almonds baked in a bain-marie is called "English almond pudding" by Auguste Escoffier.

== India ==
In Indian cuisine almond pudding is called badam kheer. It's made with only milk, sugar and ground almonds, usually flavored with cardamom.
