= Tiropita =

Greek layered pastry food

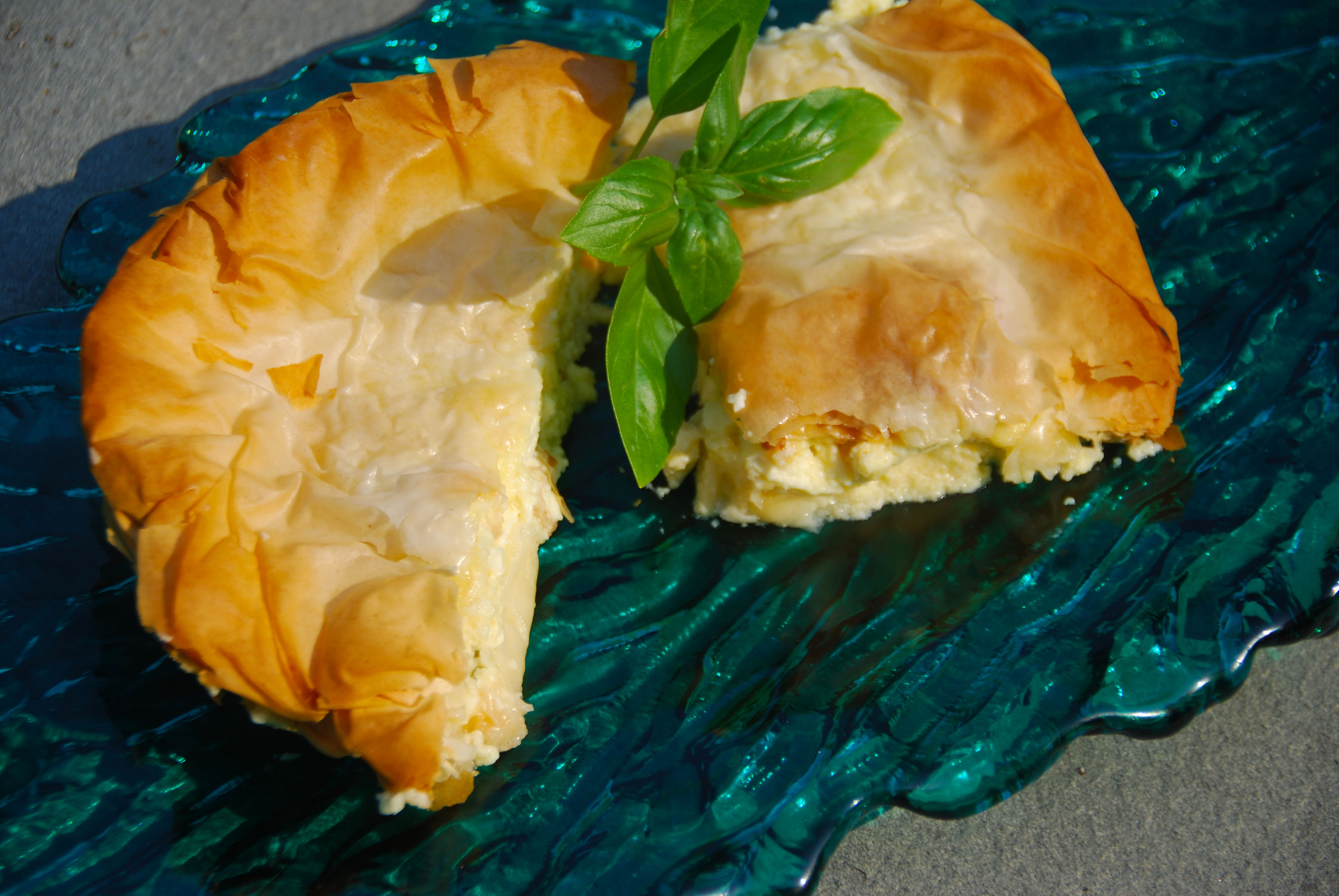
- Tiropita with garnish.
- Place of origin: Greece
- Main ingredients: phyllo, eggs, cheese

Tiropita or tyropita (Greek: τυρóπιτα, "cheese-pie") is a Greek pastry made with layers of buttered phyllo and filled with a cheese-egg mixture. It is served either in an individual-size free-form wrapped shape, or as a larger pie that is portioned.

When made with kasseri cheese, it may be called kasseropita (κασερόπιτα).

Spanakotiropita is filled with spinach and cheese; cf. spanakopita.

== History ==
According to some scholars, it is stated that in Ancient Greek cuisine, placenta cake (or plakous, πλακοῦς), and its descendants in Byzantine cuisine, plakountas tetyromenous (πλακούντας τετυρομένους, "cheesy placenta") and en tyritas plakountas (εν τυρίτας πλακούντας, "cheese-inserted placenta"), are the ancestors of modern tiropita. A recipe in Greek tradition recorded in Cato the Elder's De Agri Cultura (160 BC) describes placenta as a sweet layered cheese dish:

Shape the placenta as follows: place a single row of tracta along the whole length of the base dough. This is then covered with the mixture [cheese and honey] from the mortar. Place another row of tracta on top and go on doing so until all the cheese and honey have been used up. Finish with a layer of tracta...place the placenta in the oven and put a preheated lid on top of it [...] When ready, honey is poured over the placenta.

Placenta remains the name for a flat baked pie containing cheese in Aromanian (plãtsintã) and in Romanian (plăcintă).

Other sources state that Turks also developed similar layered dishes like tiropita. Layered pan-fried breads were developed by the Turks of Central Asia in the Late Middle Ages.

The ancient tyropatinum described by Apicius, despite the similarity in name, was a sweet custard with no crust.

== See also ==
- Banitsa
- Börek
- Gibanica
- Khachapuri
- Peinirli
