= Spinach cake =

Dessert dish

- Main ingredients: Flour, eggs, sugar, spinach and baking powder

Spinach cake is cake that contains spinach mixed into the batter.

== Ispanaklı kek ==
Ispanaklı kek
- Type: cake
- Place of origin: Turkey
- Main ingredients: egg, granulated sugar, milk, vegetable oil, spinach puree, baking powder, vanilla extract, flour, heavy cream, powdered sugar

In Turkish cuisine, ispanaklı kek (spinach cake) is a cake prepared with spinach as a primary ingredient.

== See also ==
- Köylü pastası
