= Egg wash =

Type of dissolved animal product used in glaze

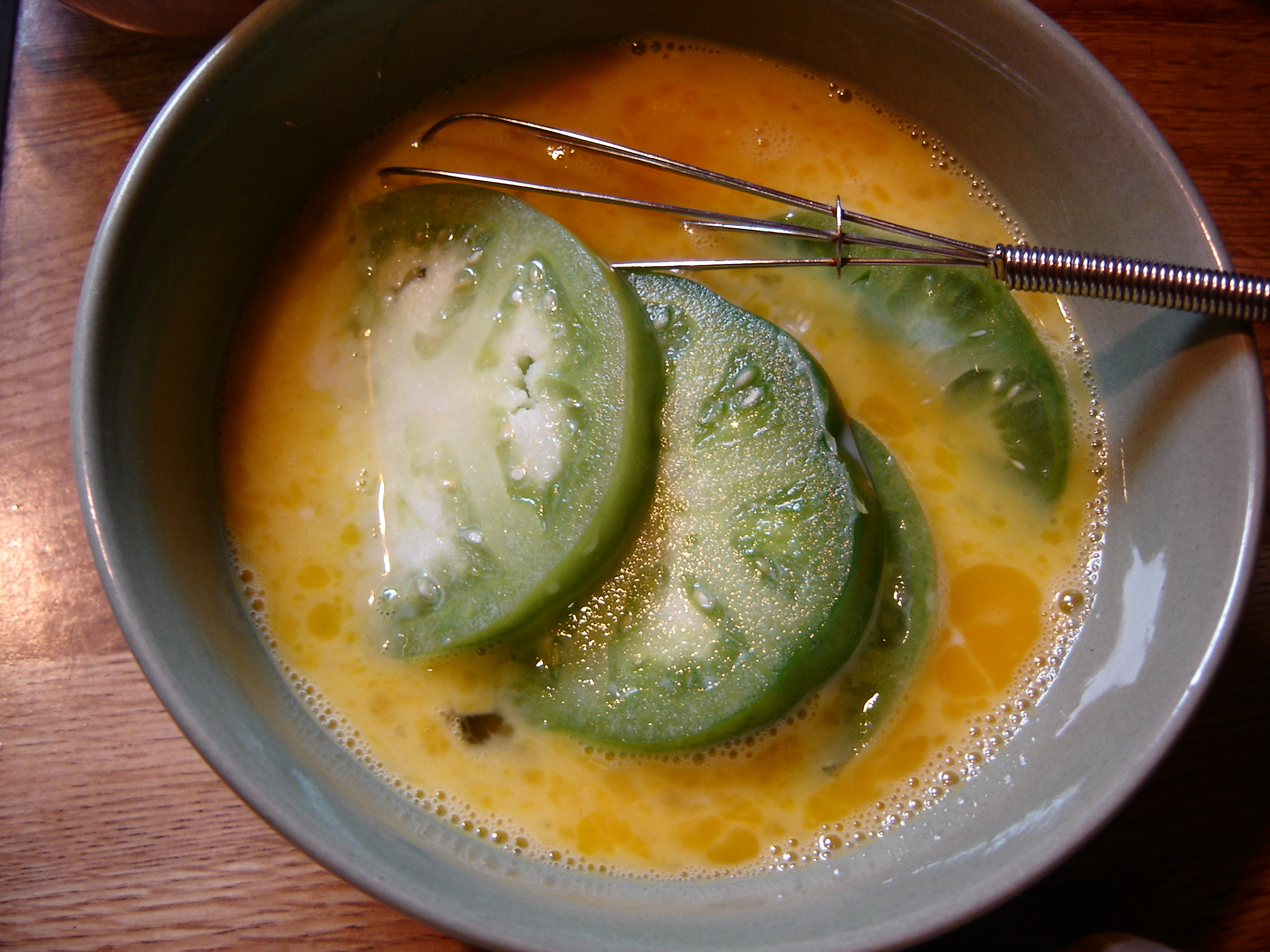
Green tomatoes in an egg wash

An egg wash is beaten eggs, sometimes mixed with another liquid such as water or milk, which is brushed onto the surface of a pastry before baking or breading. Egg washes can also be used on calzones or on fish.

== Use in pastries ==
An egg wash is often used to make pastries shiny and golden or brown in color. It is also used to help toppings or coatings stick to the surface of the pastry, or to bind pastry parts together, such as empanadas or other en croute recipes. Egg wash can usually be made with 30 ml or two tablespoons of liquid, such as milk or water, for every egg. Less liquid makes for a darker wash. The part of the egg used and liquid added determines the finished look of the crust.

== Vegan varieties ==
Vegan substitutes for egg wash include vegetable oil, non-dairy milk and butter substitutes, and light corn syrup thinned with water.
