= Savory spinach pie =

Savory spinach pie made with filo pastry

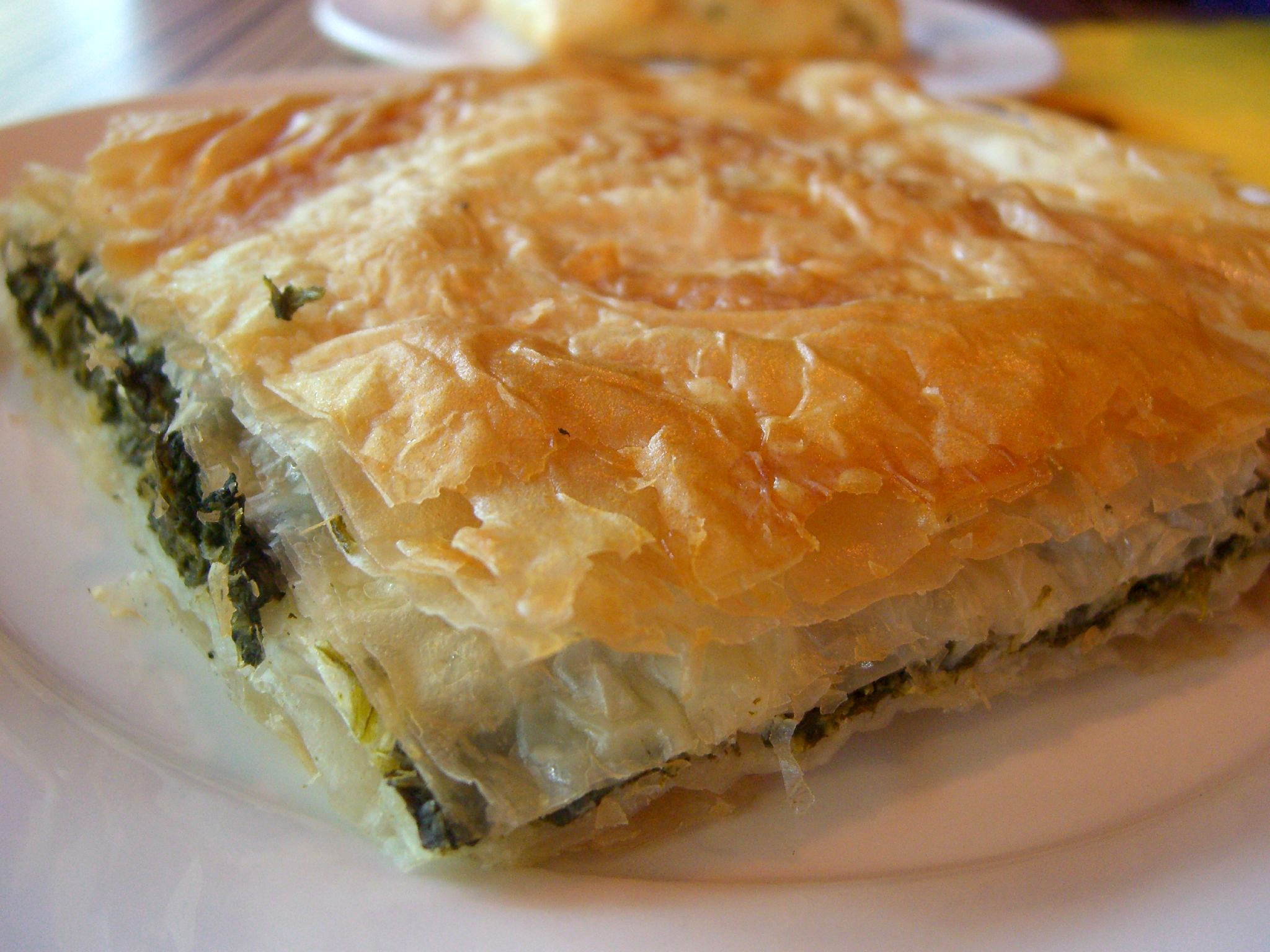
- Piece of layered variety of savory spinach pie
- Alternative names: zeljanica, spanakopita, ispanaklı Selanik böreği, ispanaklı Boşnak böreği
- Type: Börek (savoury pie)
- Place of origin: Greece
- Serving temperature: Hot
- Main ingredients: Phyllo, spinach (or leeks, chard, or sorrel), white cheese (mladi sir, or beyaz peynir, or feta, or ricotta), eggs, sometimes onions or scallions

Savory spinach pie is a pastry eaten throughout Greece, Bosnia and Herzegovina, and Turkey. Of Greek origin, this pastry’s filling is made with chopped spinach (sometimes chard) and usually feta or white cheese, and egg.

== Etymology and history ==
=== Greece ===
Spanakopita (/ˌspænəˈkɒpɪtə, ˌspɑː-, -ˈkoʊ-/; Greek: σπανακόπιτα, from σπανάκι spanáki 'spinach', and πίτα píta 'pie') is a Greek savory spinach pie. It often also contains cheese, typically feta, and may then be called spanakotiropita (Greek: σπανακοτυρόπιτα "spinach-cheese pie"), especially in northern Greece. In southern Greece, the term spanakopita is also common for the versions with cheese. A version without cheese and eggs is eaten during religious fasts throughout Greece. Spanakopita appears in many traditional Greek cookery books and appears in numerous restaurants and hotel menus throughout Greece and internationally.

=== Bosnia and Herzegovina ===
Zeljanica in Bosnia and Herzegovina is a savory pie filled with spinach, or sometimes chard (in Bosnian blitva); burek (Turkish börek) is a pie filled with minced meat.

TasteAtlas, an encyclopedia of traditional dishes, in their presentation of the 100 best pastries in the world ranked Bosnian and Herzegovinian traditional pastry dishes, putting zeljanica above burek, sirnica and krompiruša.

=== Turkey ===
Ispanaklı Selanik Böreği and/or Ispanaklı Boşnak Böreği, is a Turkish savory spinach pie, or börek. The börek gets its name from either Selanik (Thessaloniki) or Bosnia as it is widely common in Bosnia and Herzegovina.

== Ingredients and variations ==
The traditional filling comprises chopped spinach, feta cheese, onions or scallions, egg, and seasoning. Other white, preferably salted cheeses such as kefalotiri may also be mixed with the feta cheese, and some may be used as a substitute for feta cheese. Herbs such as dill, mint and parsley may be used as flavouring. The filling is wrapped or layered in phyllo (filo) pastry with butter or olive oil, either in a large pan from which individual servings are cut, or rolled into individual triangular servings. While the filo-dough recipe is most common, some recipes use a village-style pastry horiatiko, which has a thicker crust. It can also be made with puff pastry. The pastry is turns golden when baked, with the color often enhanced by butter and egg yolk. It can be served straight from the oven or at room temperature.

There is a "fasting" (νηστίσιμη; "nistisimi"), or vegan, version of spanakopita, eaten during Lent and other religious fasts. This version has spinach, onions or green onions, other green herbs like dill, parsley, or celery as filling and uses olive oil and a little wheat flour but no eggs or dairy products. The mixture is oven-baked until crisp. Non-traditional vegan versions are available that typically use tofu instead of cheese.

In rural Greece, smaller amounts of spinach are used, with the missing amount replaced with leeks, chard and sorrel.

== Related pastries ==
Börek or burek is a family of pastries or pies found in the Balkans, Middle East and Central Asia. The pastry is made of a thin flaky dough such as filo with a variety of fillings, such as meat, cheese, spinach, or potatoes. Boreks are mainly associated with the Middle East, Armenia, and also with the former Ottoman Empire, including the Balkans and the South Caucasus, Eastern European and Central European countries, Northern Africa and Central Asia.

== See also ==
- Bougatsa
- Burek
- Gibanica
- Rustico (pastry)
- Tiropita, a traditional Greek pie made with cheese
- List of Greek dishes
- List of Turkish dishes
- List of pies, tarts and flans
- List of snack foods
