= Gil Marks =

American food writer and historian (1952–2014)

Gilbert Stanley Marks (Hebrew: גיל מרקס; May 30, 1952 – December 5, 2014) was an American food writer and historian noted for his reference and cookbooks on the subject of Jewish food. He was the founding editor of Kosher Gourmet magazine. He moved to Israel and became a citizen in 2012 and died of lung cancer on December 5, 2014, at the hospice at Hadassah Hospital in Jerusalem.

== Education ==
Marks was born in 1952 in Charleston, West Virginia. After graduating from high school at Talmudical Academy of Baltimore, Marks studied at Yeshiva University, and graduated with an M.A. in Jewish history, M.S.W. in social work and rabbinical ordination from Rabbi Isaac Elchanan Theological Seminary, a Yeshiva University affiliate.

== Published works ==
Marks was the founding editor of Kosher Gourmet magazine, in 1986, which ran for about six years before closing in the early 1990s.

The following books written by Marks have been published:

- The World of Jewish Cooking: More Than 500 Traditional Recipes from Alsace to Yemen (Simon & Schuster, 1996)
- The World of Jewish Entertaining: Menus and Recipes for the Sabbath, Holidays, and Other Family Celebrations (Simon & Schuster, 1998)
- The World Of Jewish Desserts: More Than 400 Delectable Recipes from Jewish Communities (Simon & Schuster, 2000)
- Olive Trees and Honey: A Treasury of Vegetarian Recipes from Jewish Communities Around the World (Wiley, 2004)
- Encyclopedia of Jewish Food (Wiley, 2010)

Marks was also among the international team of contributors to Meals in Science and Practice: Interdisciplinary Research and Business Applications (Woodhead Publishing, 2009).

== Awards ==
Olive Trees and Honey is a 2005 James Beard Foundation Award winner and a 2006 IACP Cookbook Award finalist.

The Encyclopedia of Jewish Food earned Marks a place on the Forward 50 for 2010, a list of fifty American Jews "who have made a significant impact on the Jewish story in the past year", in the newly created "Food contributors" category. The book was also nominated for the 2011 James Beard Foundation Award for "Reference and Scholarship" and was recognized by Library Journal as the best reference book of 2010 in the Food category.
