= Boyoz =

Turkish pastry of Sephardic Jewish origin

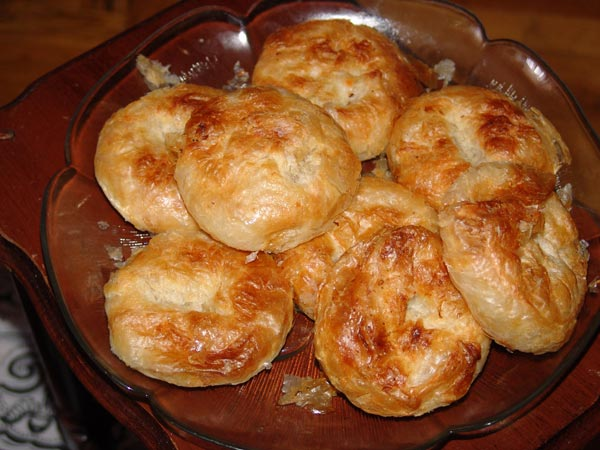
- Type: Pastry
- Place of origin: Turkey
- Region or state: İzmir
- Created by: Sephardic Jewish
- Main ingredients: Flour, sunflower oil, tahini

Boyoz, or boyo, is a pastry of Sephardic Jewish origin associated with İzmir, Turkey, where it is regarded as a characteristic local speciality. Widely identified with the city's culinary culture, it is commercially produced in İzmir and is officially registered as İzmir Boyozu as a geographical indication limited to the province of İzmir. Traditional descriptions of boyoz emphasize a simple layered dough; plain versions are common, although filled varieties are also documented.

Boyoz paste is a mixture of flour, sunflower oil, and a small amount of tahini. Originally, the recipe utilized sesame oil. It is kneaded by hand, and the ball of paste is left to rest for two hours. The paste is then flattened to the width of a dish and left to rest again. It is then kneaded and opened once more, before being formed into a roll and left to repose as such for a further period of several hours. When the tissue of the paste is still soft but about to detach into pieces, it is cut into small balls and put in rows of small pans and marinated in vegetable oil between half an hour and one hour. The paste then takes an oval form and acquires the consistency of a millefeuille. The small balls can then be put on a tray in a very high-temperature oven either in plain form or with fillings of cheese or spinach added inside.

The usual accompaniments for boyoz are dark tea and hard-boiled eggs generously sprinkled with black pepper. Boyoz is generally consumed outdoors, and purchased from street vendors. In İzmir, boyoz is also sold at traditional "gevrekçi" street stalls — small breakfast kiosks that serve freshly baked pastries in the morning. The İzmir Boyoz Festival is an annual public event held in celebration of the pastry as part of the city's cultural identity.

== Origin ==
The word boyoz is the plural of the Ladino word boyo, cognate with the Spanish word bollo, meaning "a small and round pastry, a bun", itself derived from the Latin bulla, meaning "a round object, a bubble, or a ball."

Many sources associate boyoz with the Sephardic Jewish heritage of İzmir. Sephardic Jews were expelled from Spain in 1492 and settled in various parts of the Ottoman Empire, where they introduced the pastry to İzmir's urban culture. İzmir later emerged as an important Sephardic center. İzmir boyozu is officially recognized as a historic local pastry produced in the city since the Ottoman period. Related Sephardic pastries known as boyos are also documented in Judeo-Spanish food traditions, often with cheese or spinach fillings.

== See also ==
- Bollos
- List of pastries

== General and cited sources ==
- Trademark Tastes of Izmir
