= Maarouk =

Syrian sweetbread popular on Ramadan

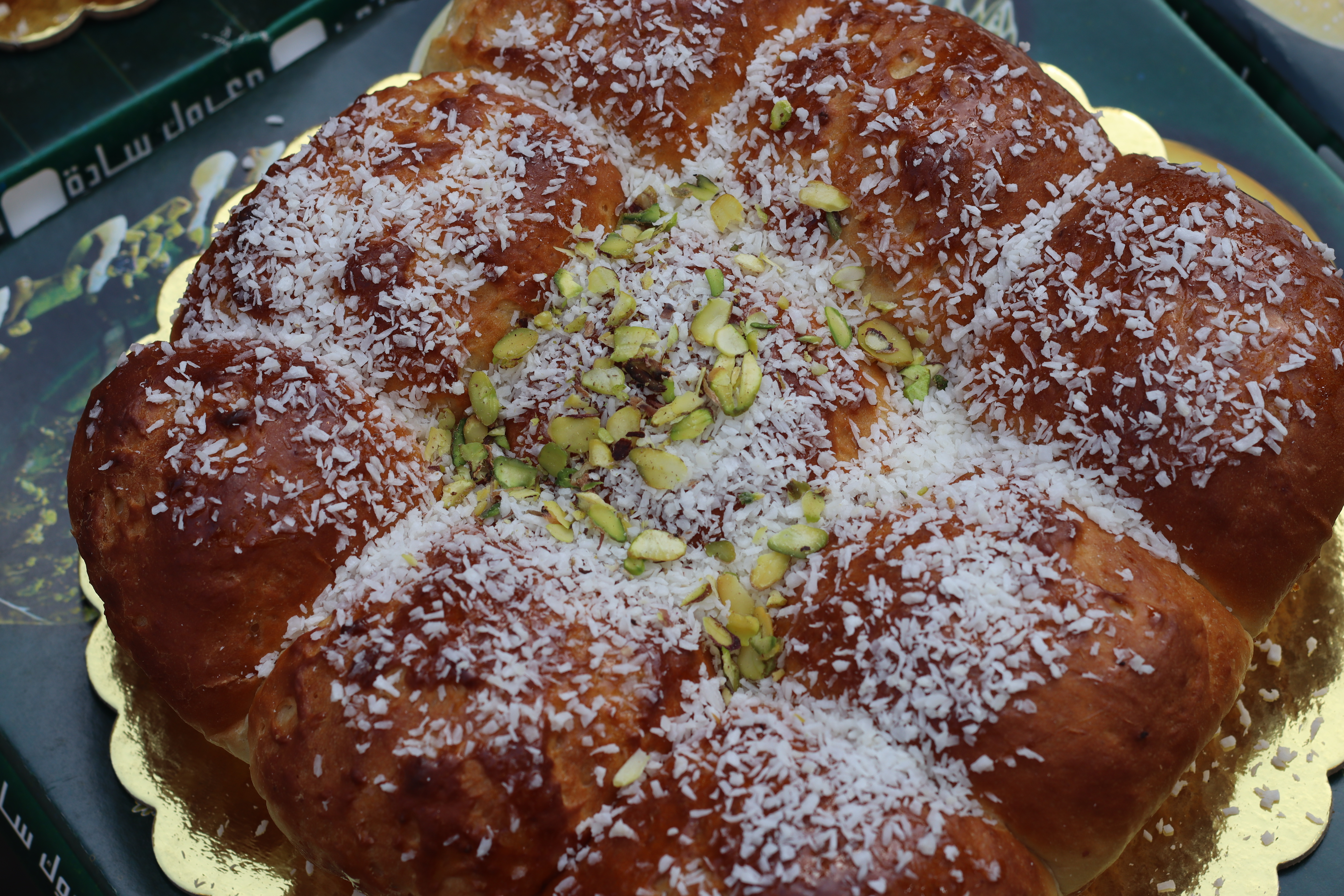
- Maarouk bread, garnished with shredded coconut and crushed pistachios
- Alternative names: Ramadan bread
- Type: Bread
- Region or state: Levant
- Associated cuisine: Syrian cuisine

Maarouk (Arabic: معروك, romanized: maʿrūk), Marook, or "Ramadan bread", is a traditional Syrian leavened sweet bread common in Levantine cuisine. It is made into a variety of shapes and sizes, and is stuffed with various fillings. It is very popular during the month of Ramadan, and is traditionally stuffed with date paste, and flavored with mahleb.

== History ==
Kneaded leavened breads have existed in the Mashriq since at least the 10th century; the 10th-century cookbook Kitāb al-Ṭabīkh by Ibn Sayyar al-Warraq contained a recipe for khubz mʻrūk (well-kneaded bread).

A similar, date-stuffed, ring bread is mentioned as "aljerk" in the records from Jerusalem's Islamic court in the 17th century.

It is similar to other leavened breads found in Iraq and Turkey like Çörek, also known as "zherk" (Arabic: جرك), the Iraqi bread has a similar shape and date stuffing to maarouk.

Aleppan historian Khayr al-Din al-Asadi's encyclopedia (completed 1971, published posthumously in 1981) described maarouk as a type of ka'ak (كعك معروك) that is kneaded thoroughly then brushed with syrup after it is baked and then topped with sesame seeds and nigella sative seeds. The bread was traditionally only made during Ramadan.

== Etymology ==
The term maʿrūk (المعروك) derives from the Arabic root ʿaraka (عرك), meaning "to knead" or "to mix thoroughly until cohesive." Traditionally, maʿrūk was prepared by hand before the advent of kneading machines.

== Preparation and ingredients ==
The dough for maarouk typically uses yeast for leavening, eggs and milk are sometimes added in, various spices are incorporated into the dough.

The most common stuffing is date palm, a wide array of other fillings are available, including chocolate, qishta, cheese, Biscoff Lotus, coconut, among many others, it is sometimes sold plain with no filling.

Some commons shapes for the bread are rings, braids, and loafs.

The toppings used can vary significantly as well, common additions are sesame seeds, nigella seeds, shredded coconut, and various nuts. Egg wash is also added on top.

== By region ==
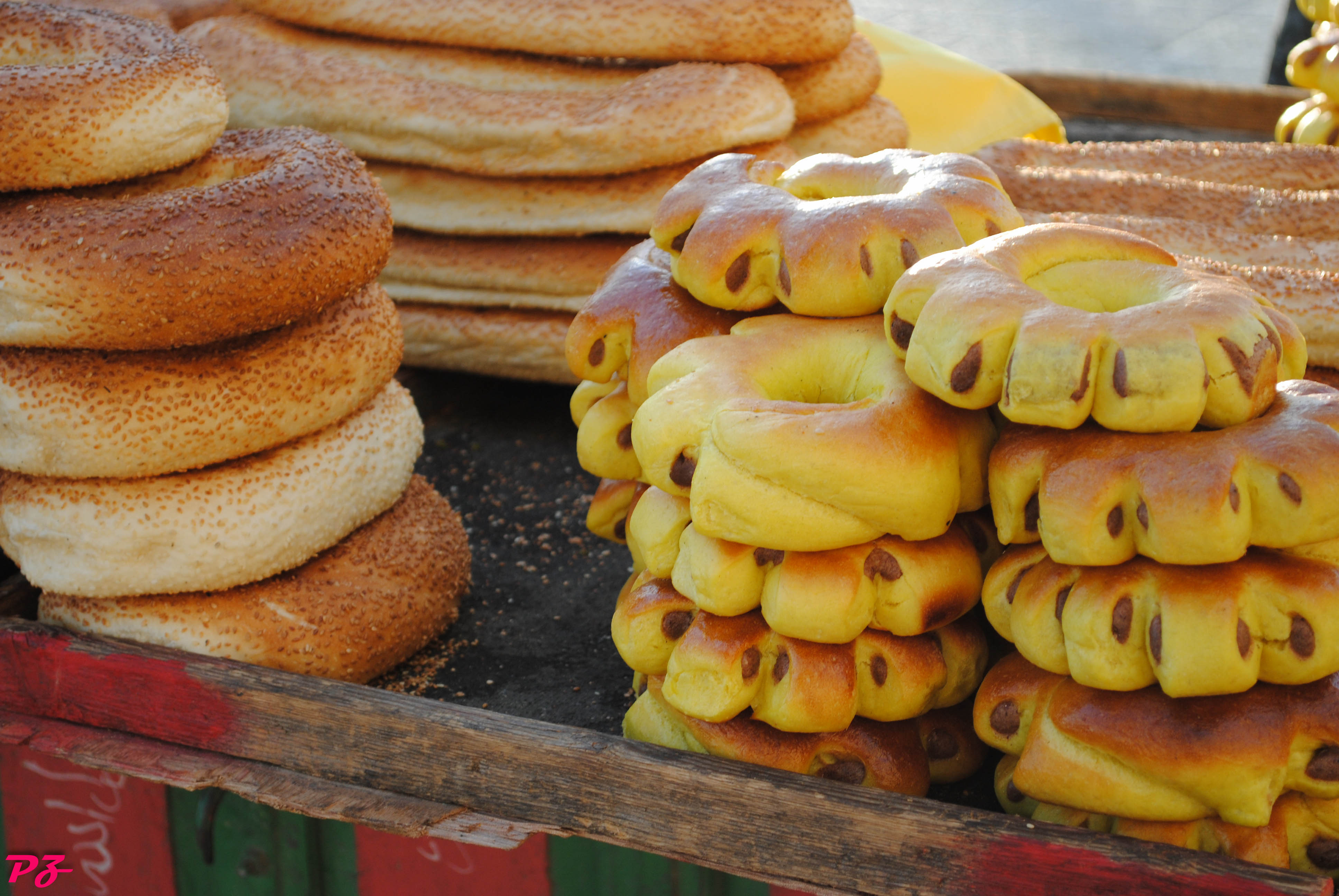
Maarouk in Jerusalem, sold next to Jerusalem bagels

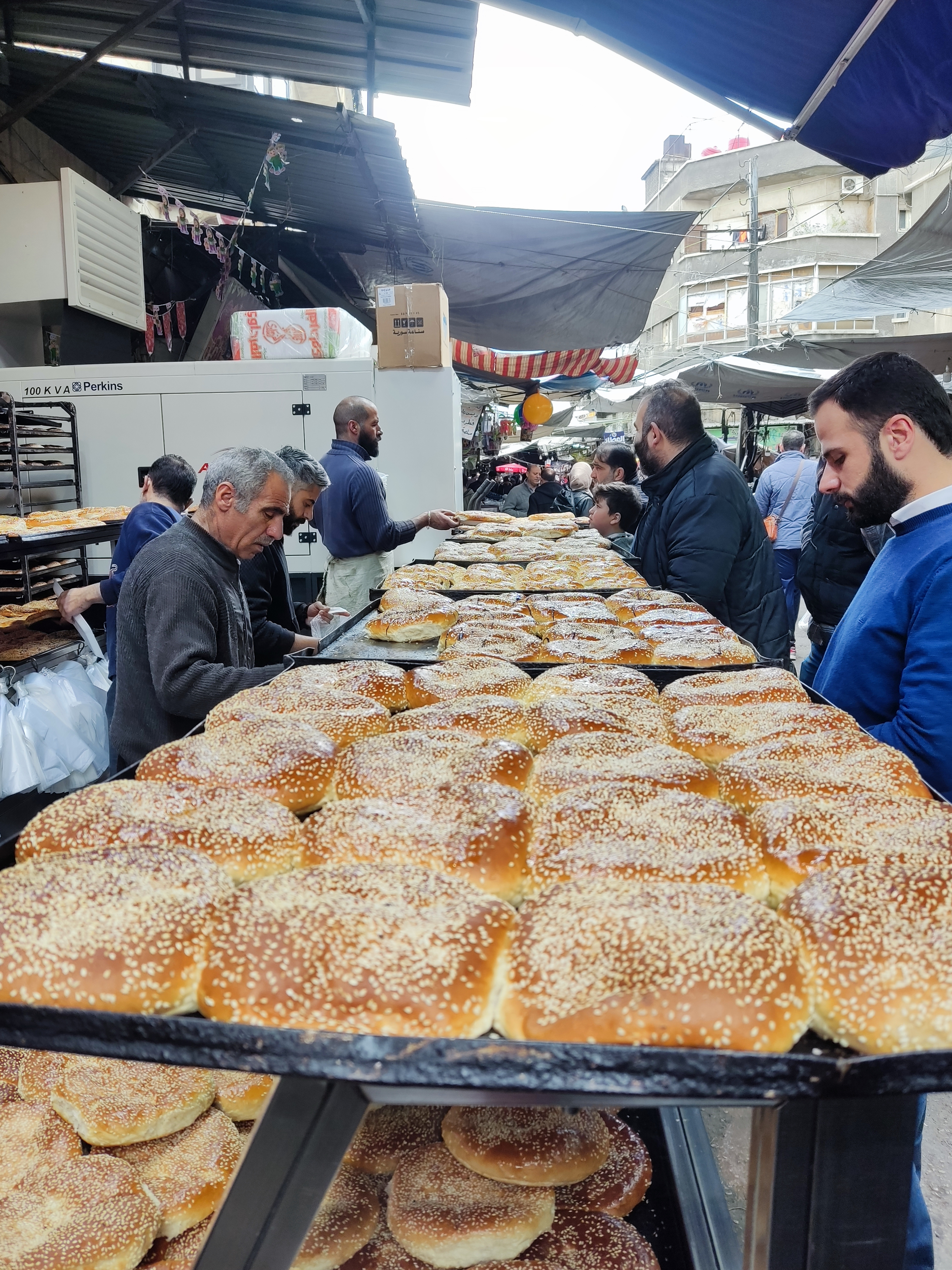
Maarouk seller in Damascus, Syria

Maarouk is popular in Syria, where it is a staple of Ramadan cuisine. Hence it is also known as "Ramadan bread".

Despite its immense popularity, its availability and consumption have been negatively impacted by the Syrian civil war.

Outside of Syria, maarouk is popular in the West Bank and Jordan, as well as Lebanon during Ramadan. Maarouk is also a staple of the Cuisine of Jerusalem, where it is sold on stalls in the Old City of Jerusalem, it is often stuffed with date palm paste and given a yellow color by incorporating turmeric into the mix.

== See also ==
- Khaliat Nahl
- Challah
- Ka'ak
- Ramazan pidesi
- Levantine cuisine
