= Cuisine of Jerusalem =

Local cuisine in and around the city of Jerusalem

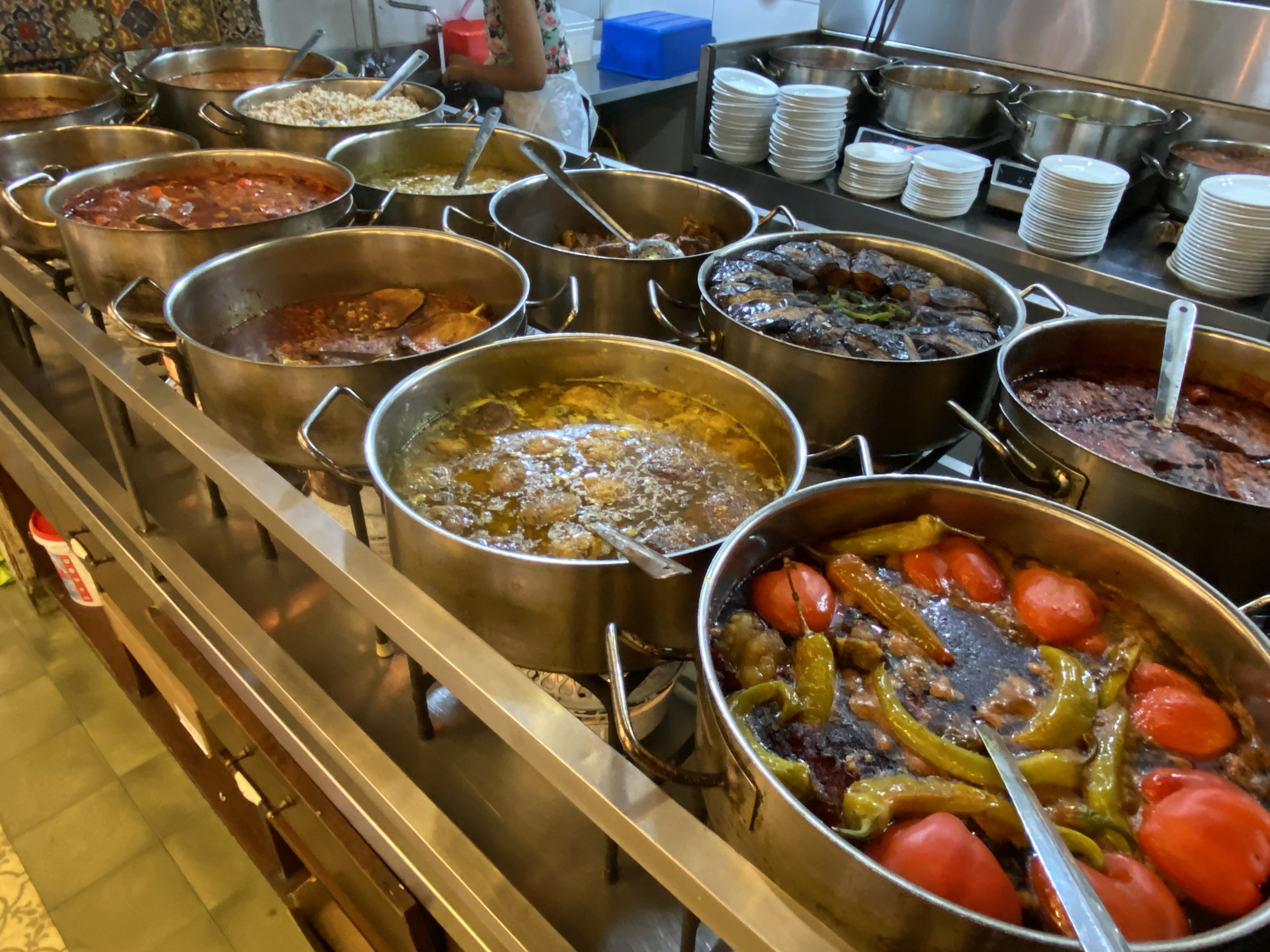
Stews at Azura, an Iraqi/Kurdi Jewish restaurant at the Mahane Yehuda Market

The cuisine of Jerusalem reflects the city's long history as a crossroads of cultures and religions. Millennia of trade, conquest, and migration have resulted in a unique fusion of culinary traditions, with significant influences from Jewish (predominantly Sephardic) and Levantine Arab cuisine (especially Palestinian).

Dishes in Jerusalem feature fresh, seasonal Mediterranean ingredients, with a strong emphasis on vegetables, fruits, olive oil, and herbs. Street food is a prominent aspect of the culinary scene, thriving in markets such as the Mahane Yehuda Market and the Arab souk of the Old City. Modern Jerusalem caters to a global palate, with a growing number of restaurants offering international fare alongside traditional dishes.

Jerusalem has several distinctive dishes, including ka'ak-al-quds (Jerusalem bagel), a long, oval-shaped bread typically topped with sesame seeds and served with za'atar; Jerusalem mixed grill, a dish made from chicken hearts, spleens, and liver mixed with bits of lamb and fried with onions and spices; and kubbeh, a type of dumpling made from bulgur or semolina filled with minced meat served in soup. Sephardic classics such as bourekas (savory pastries), biscochos (cookies), sofrito (a meat stew), orez shu'it (rice and beans), makaroni hamin (slow-cooked pasta), and pastelikos (meat-stuffed pastries) are also prevalent. Additionally, Ashkenazi Yerushalmi Kugel, a traditional noodle casserole, and Middle Eastern staples like hummus, falafel, shawarma, and knafeh, are integral to Jerusalem's culinary identity.

== History ==
There are literary and archaeological remnants that shed light on the Israelite cuisine of ancient Jerusalem. In Samuel II, David is said to have distributed ashishim, lentil pancakes, among the city's inhabitants. Archaeological findings reveal traces of vanilla discovered in wine jars from the 7th to 6th centuries BCE, suggesting that local elites enjoyed vanilla-flavored wine—a notable early use of this spice in the Old World. Abundant fish bones from the Iron Age suggest that fish, likely preserved rather than fresh due to the city's distance from the Mediterranean coast, were sold and consumed in the city. The Books of Chronicles, Zephaniah, and Nehemiah also mention a "Fish Gate" in the city. In the Ophel area, large storage jars used for storing flour, oil, and honey were found in a structure destroyed during Nebuchadnezzar's siege in 587 BCE. A pithos with a palm tree inscription indicates that some jars contained date honey. Additionally, the earliest archaeological evidence of citrus fruits in the Middle East dates back to the 5th and 6th centuries BCE, discovered in the Ramat Rachel area.

In Crusader times, Queen Melisende established three parallel streets, known as the "Triple Market," in 1152. These streets, which remain largely intact, were named the Street of Herbs, the Street of Bad Cooking (now the Perfumers' Market), and the Covered Street. The Street of Herbs was dedicated to selling herbs, fruit, and spices, the Covered Street focused on cloth, and the Street of Bad Cooking offered prepared food to pilgrims and locals.

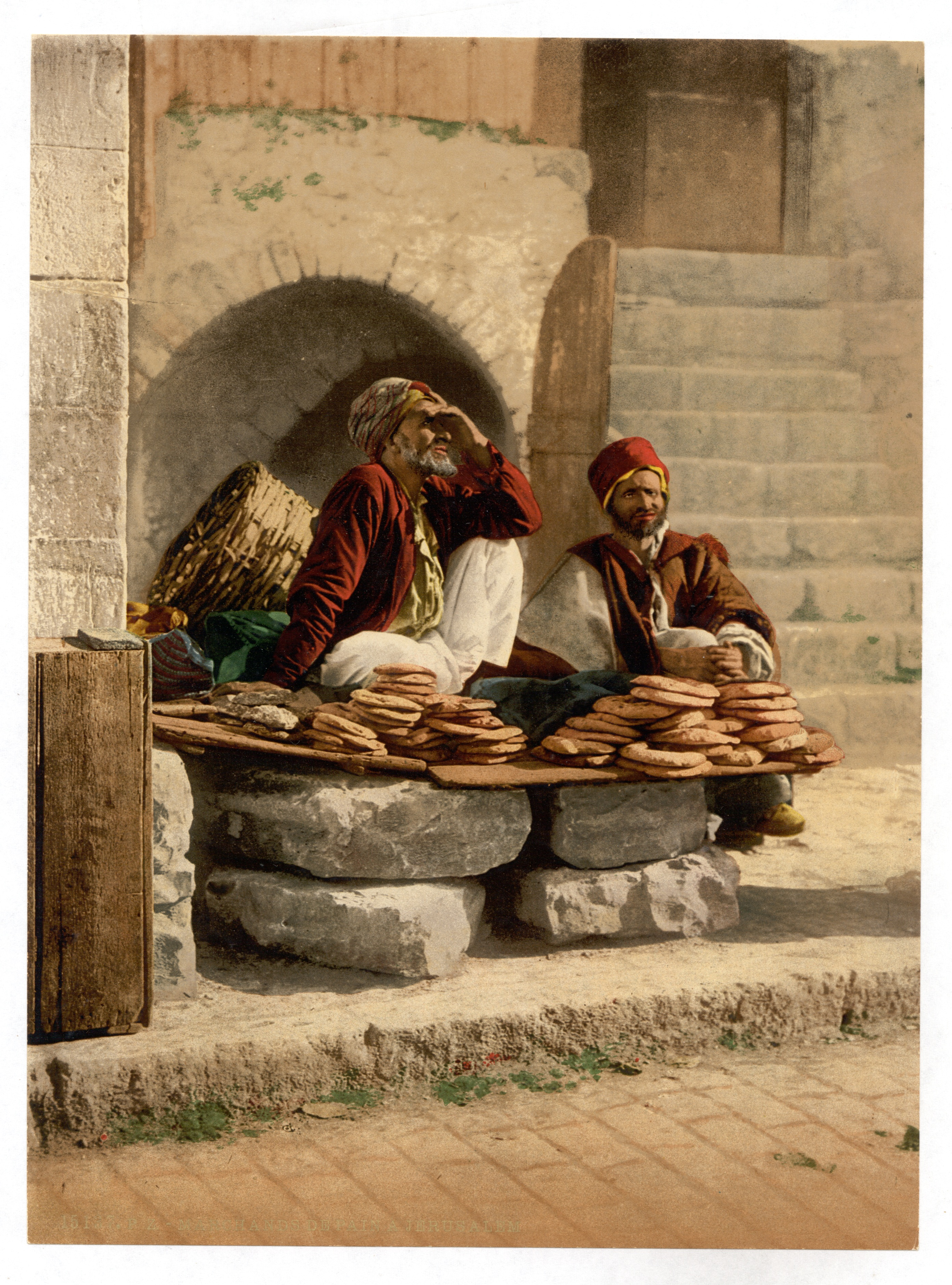
Bread sellers in Jerusalem, between 1890 and 1900

In the 16th century, bread, favored for its affordability and high nutritional value, was the predominant staple in Jerusalem, surpassing both meat and olive oil in importance. Meat was costly and less accessible, while olive oil, though cheaper, played a less central role in the diet. Various types of bread, including kmaj (a pocket bread similar to pita, with a name of Persian origin), mawi (pancakes made from wheat, semolina, and water), sammun (bread rolls), simid, tannuri, and tabbuni, were produced by bakeries, which often baked multiple times a day to meet the high demand. Records from Jerusalem's Islamic court in the 17th century provide additional details about breads and baked goods available at the time, including kmaj, ka'ak (sesame bagels), and aljerk (a loaf filled with dates, cheese, and herbs, today known as maruk). Obadiah of Bertinoro, who visited Jerusalem in the late 15th century, described finding grapes larger than those in Romagna, Italy, and noted the sale of grape syrup. Israel of Perusha, writing in the 16th century, noted that grapes were among the only fruits available in the city, and also mentioned the selling of grape syrup. In 1853, French Orientalist Louis Félicien de Saulcy, remarked in his writings after attending an "Arab Soirée" in Jerusalem that "In Jerusalem, there is no such thing as a festival without a Kenafeh." He also noted that guests in the party drank coffee, water or wine "according as the invited guest happened to be a Christian or a [Muslim]."

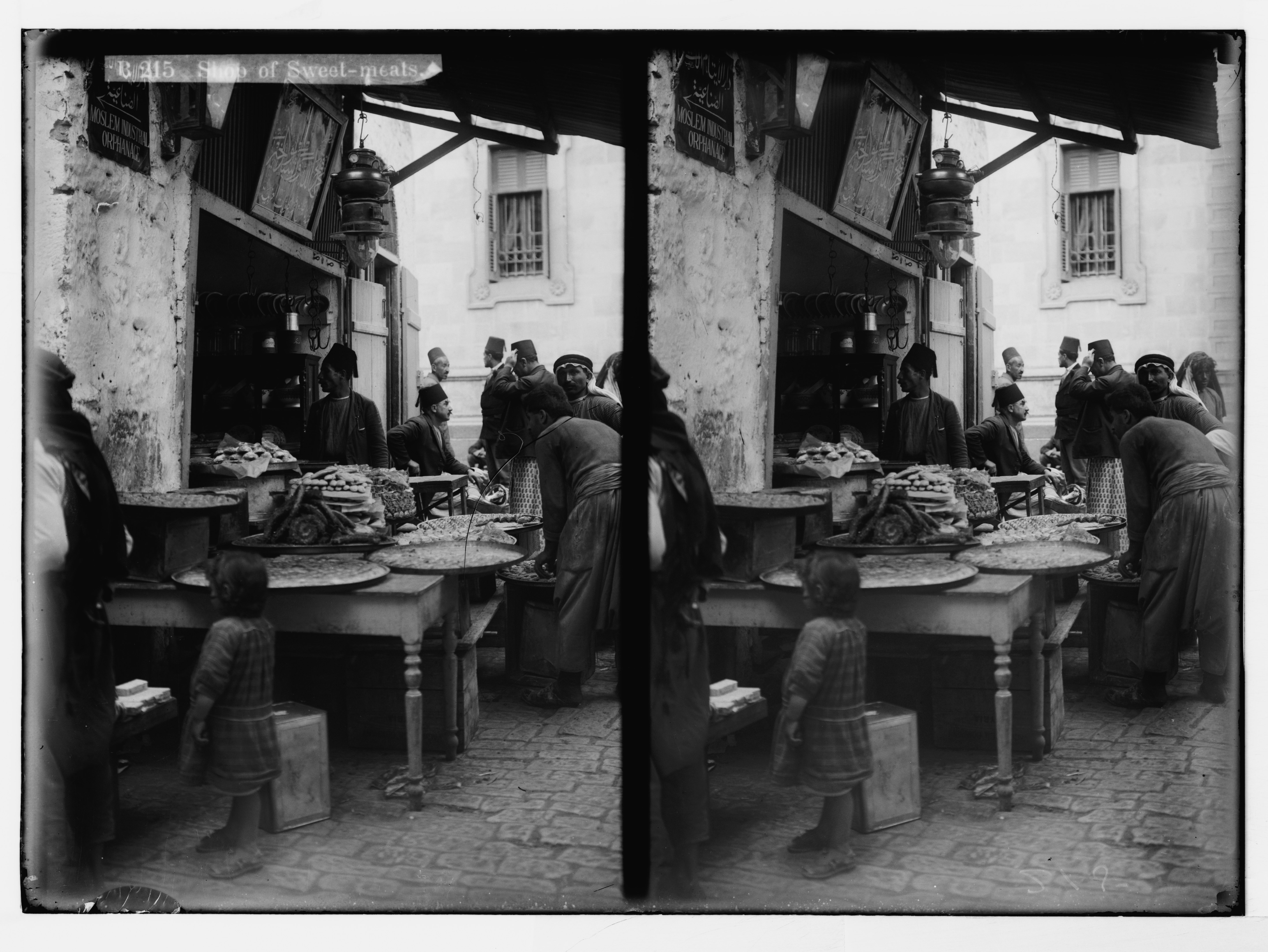
A sweets shop in the dabbagha market, next to Alexander's Courtyard, by the Matson Photo Service, early 20th century.

Jerusalem's cuisine has evolved significantly over the past two centuries. In the early 19th century, the city housed about 9,000 residents, including 2,000 Jews from Sephardic, Musta'arabi, and Ashkenazi backgrounds. These communities maintained distinct culinary traditions from their countries of origin, blending with local Arab ingredients and cooking methods. This period marked the beginning of a unique Jerusalemite cuisine that combined various Jewish traditions with local Arab influences. A significant role in shaping this culinary landscape was played by Sephardic Jews, descendants of those expelled from Spain, who arrived from the Ottoman Empire in the 17th and 18th centuries. Their influence led to a predominantly Sephardic character in the city's food culture.

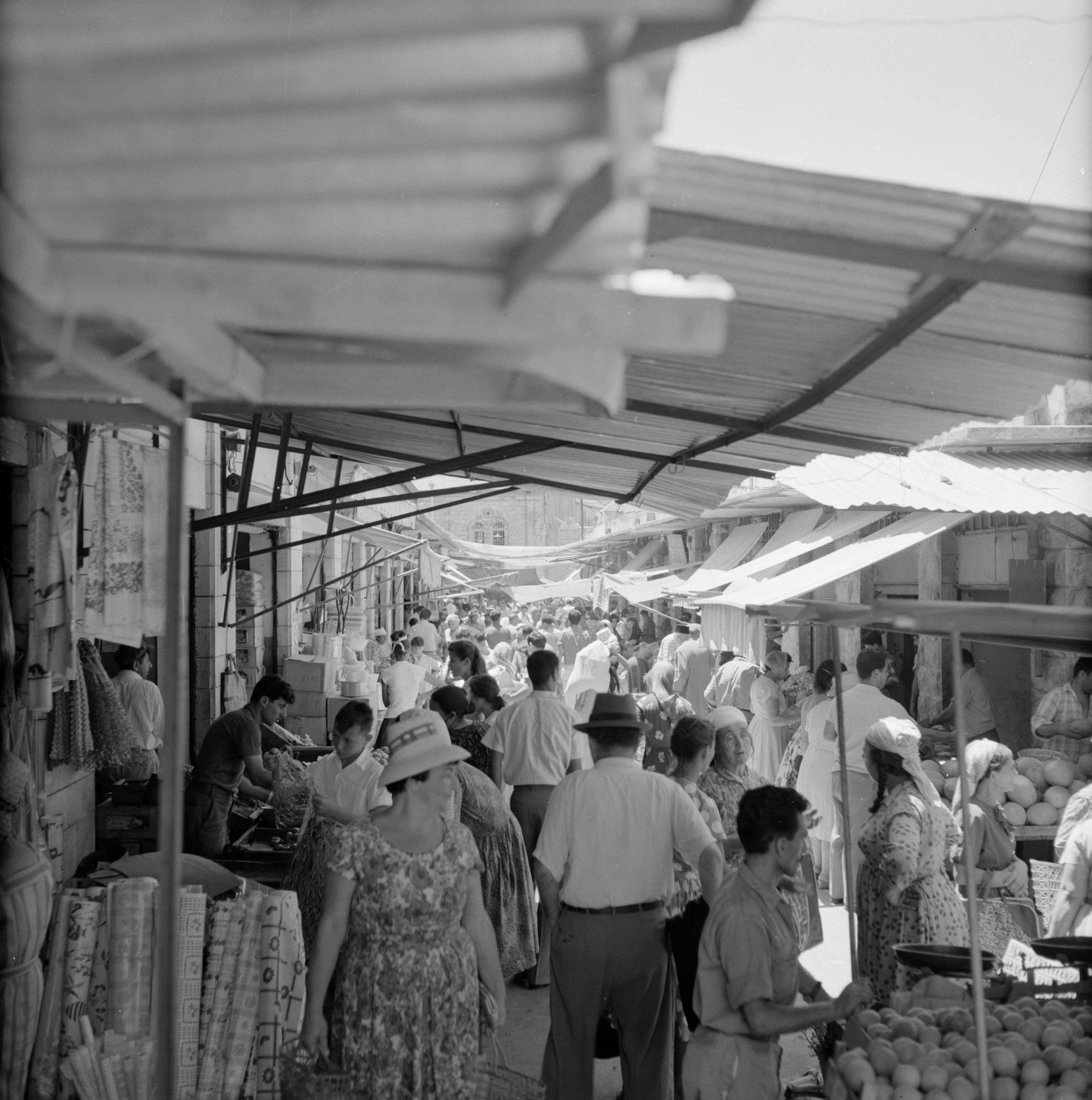
Mahane Yehuda Market in 1964

As Jerusalem's population grew, so did its Jewish community, eventually reaching two-thirds of the city's total. This growth brought further diversification to the culinary scene. The early 19th century saw an influx of Jews from Eastern and Western Europe, along with migrants from Turkey, Syria, the Balkans and North Africa. The arrival of Jews from the Maghreb in the 1840s, and later from Iran, Bukhara, Yemen, and Kurdistan in the late 19th and early 20th centuries, introduced new culinary influences. Each group brought unique ingredients and cooking techniques, further enriching Jerusalemite cuisine.

In the post-World War II era and following the establishment of the State of Israel, Jerusalem continued to see a melding of culinary traditions. The influx of Jewish immigrants from around the world further enriched the city's food culture. Modern Jerusalemite cuisine is a dynamic blend of historical influences from Jewish communities, including Sephardic, Ashkenazi, and Kurdish, as well as Palestinian traditions. Today, it reflects a fusion of ancient recipes and modern culinary practices.

Following the 1967 War, there was an influx of Palestinian laborers from the West Bank. The number of Palestinian restaurants in Jerusalem increased, and East Jerusalem became a popular area for hummus restaurants.

== Breads and pastries ==
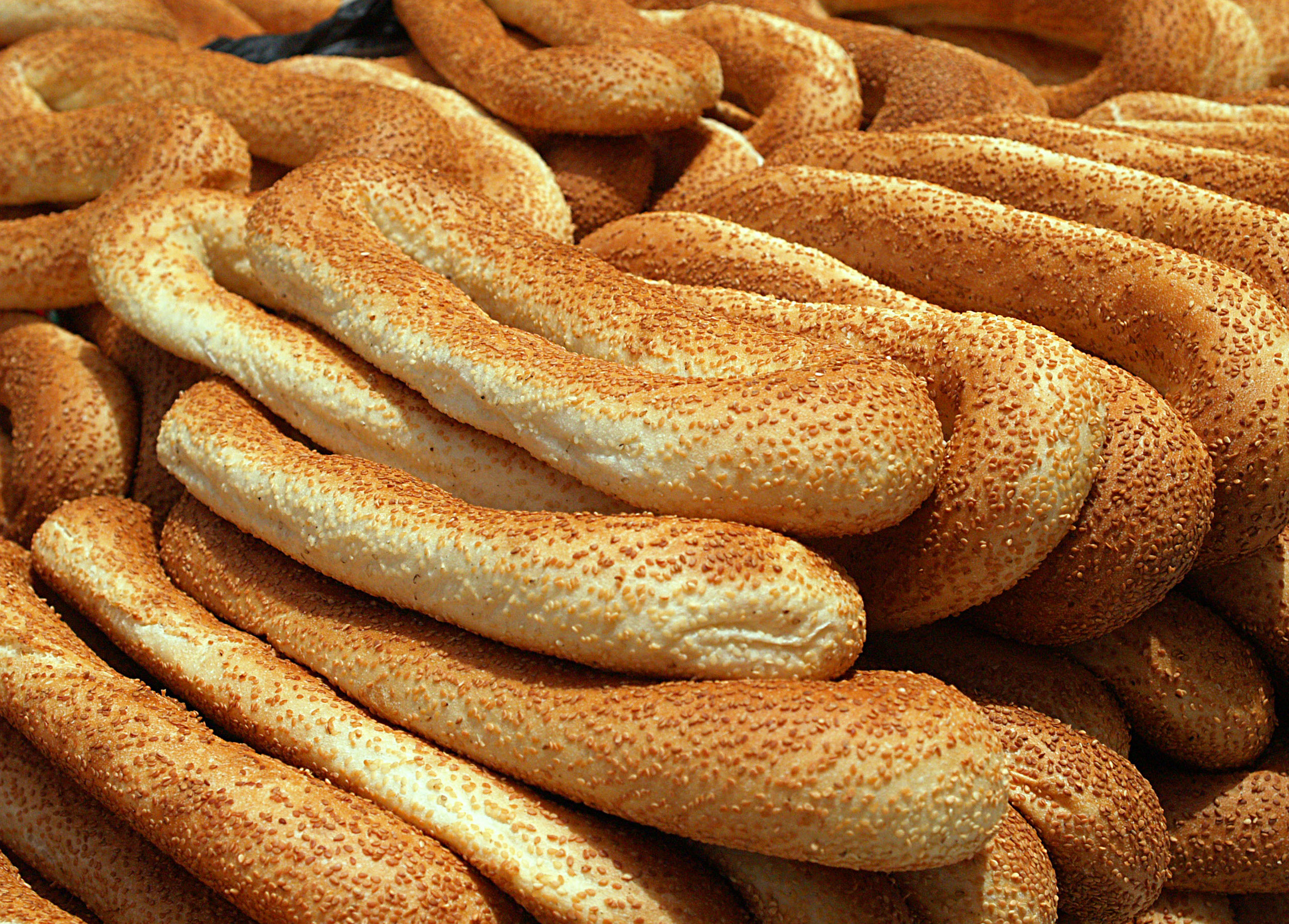
Jerusalem bagel

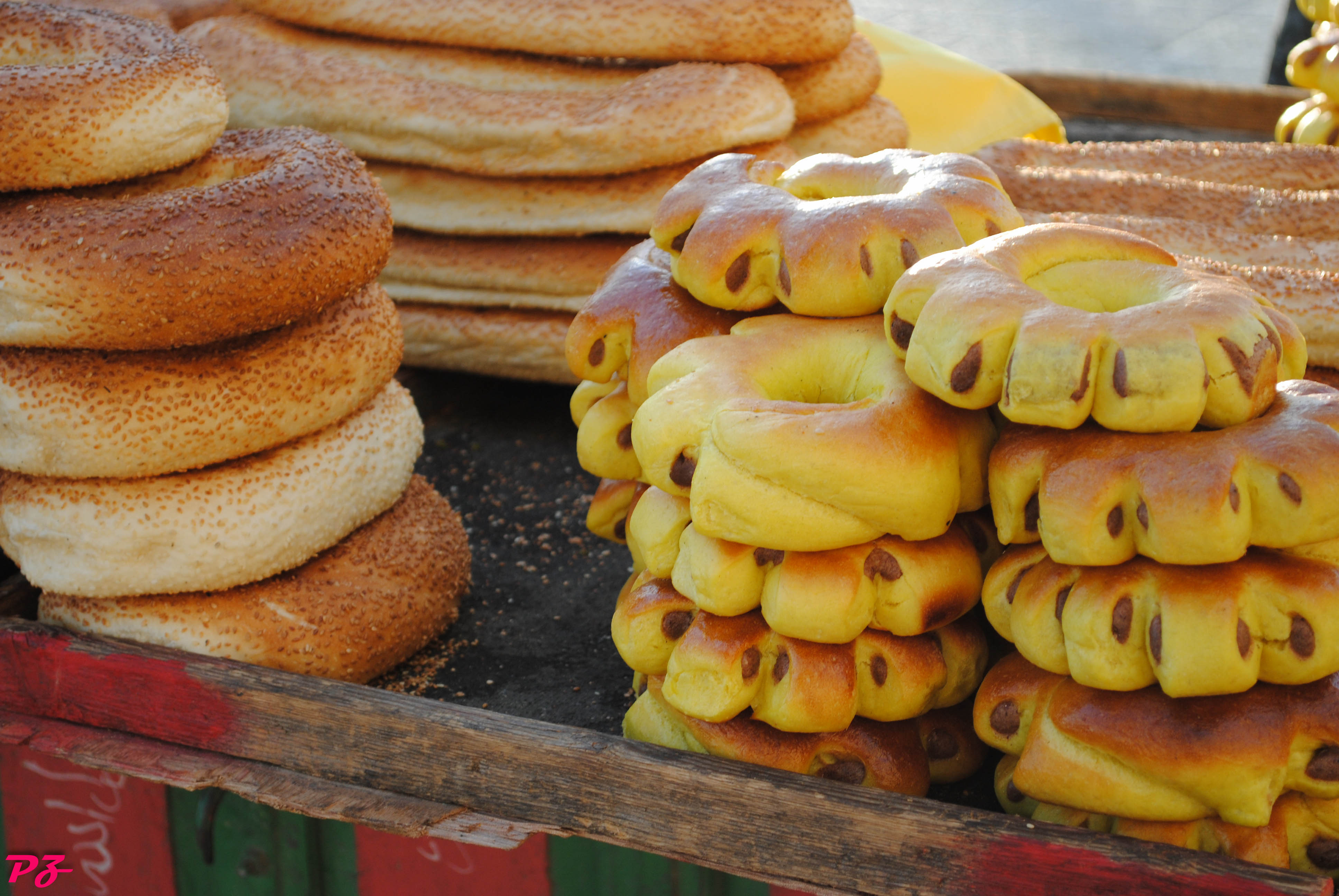
Maaruk, a date-stuffed bread sold in a food stall at the Old City of Jerusalem

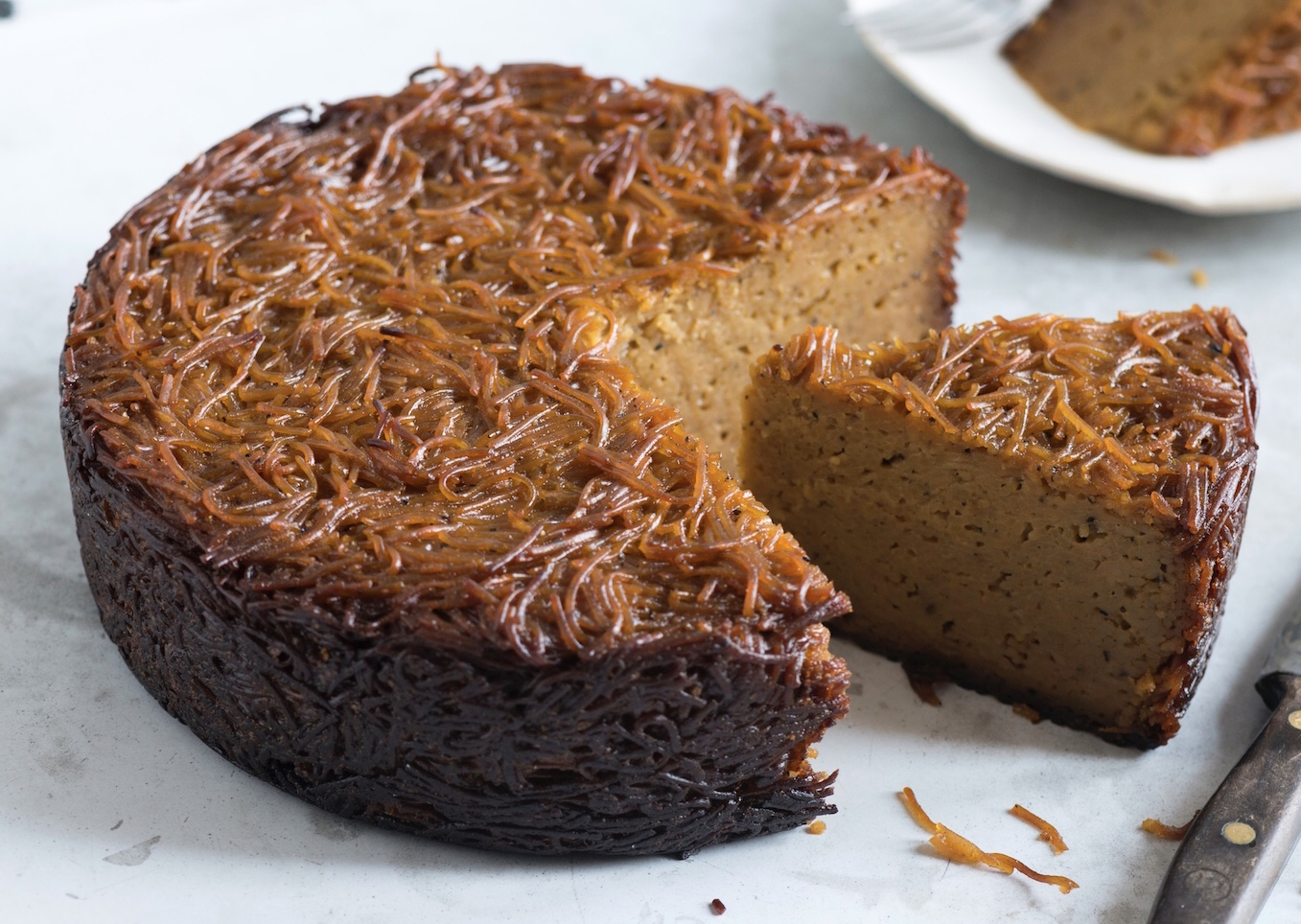
The Jerusalem kugel, a spiced noodle casserole commonly served on Shabbat

Ka'ak-al-quds is a traditional Palestinian bread with a unique oval shape. A specialty of Jerusalem, it may have been influenced by the Ottoman Empire. According to Janna Gur, it is thought that ka'ak-al-quds became popular among Israelis after the Six-Day War, after which it was also known as the Jerusalem bagel. Lighter than the North American bagel, it is baked but not boiled. Topped with sesame seeds, it is often eaten with za'atar, falafel, or hard-boiled eggs. In the Old City, it is sold by Palestinian street vendors and bakeries— some of which are over 100 years old. Some Palestinians claim that ka'ak-al-quds tastes best when made in Jerusalem, so it is often brought as a gift for people living elsewhere.

A date-filled bread called maaruk, enriched with eggs and given a yellow hue from turmeric, can also be found in the Old City. The Yemenite Jewish community introduced jachnun to the city, and it became a staple in the local diet. At Mahane Yehuda Market, challah, a braided bread traditionally made for Shabbat, and bourekas, a savory filled pastry of Sephardic origin, are sold. In the Armenian Quarter of the old city, traditional breads are like Armenian sfiha (elsewhere called lahmacun) are prepared, distinguished from Palestinian sfiha by its thinness.

Yerushalmi kugel, a speciality of Jerusalem, is a unique dish combining sweet and savory flavors. Made with caramel, black pepper, and egg noodles, it develops a crisp exterior and a chewy interior when baked. This casserole, often found in Orthodox Jewish communities, is characterized by its rich, peppery, and sweet taste. The dish may trace its origins to the 19th century, when Ashkenazi Jews brought kugel to Jerusalem, adapting its ingredients to local availability by incorporating caramel and a Sephardic-influenced sharpness. Yerushalmi kugel can be served warm or cold, and reheated multiple times, making it a popular choice for Shabbat, when it is commonly served at kiddush or as a side dish accompanying cholent.

== Main dishes ==
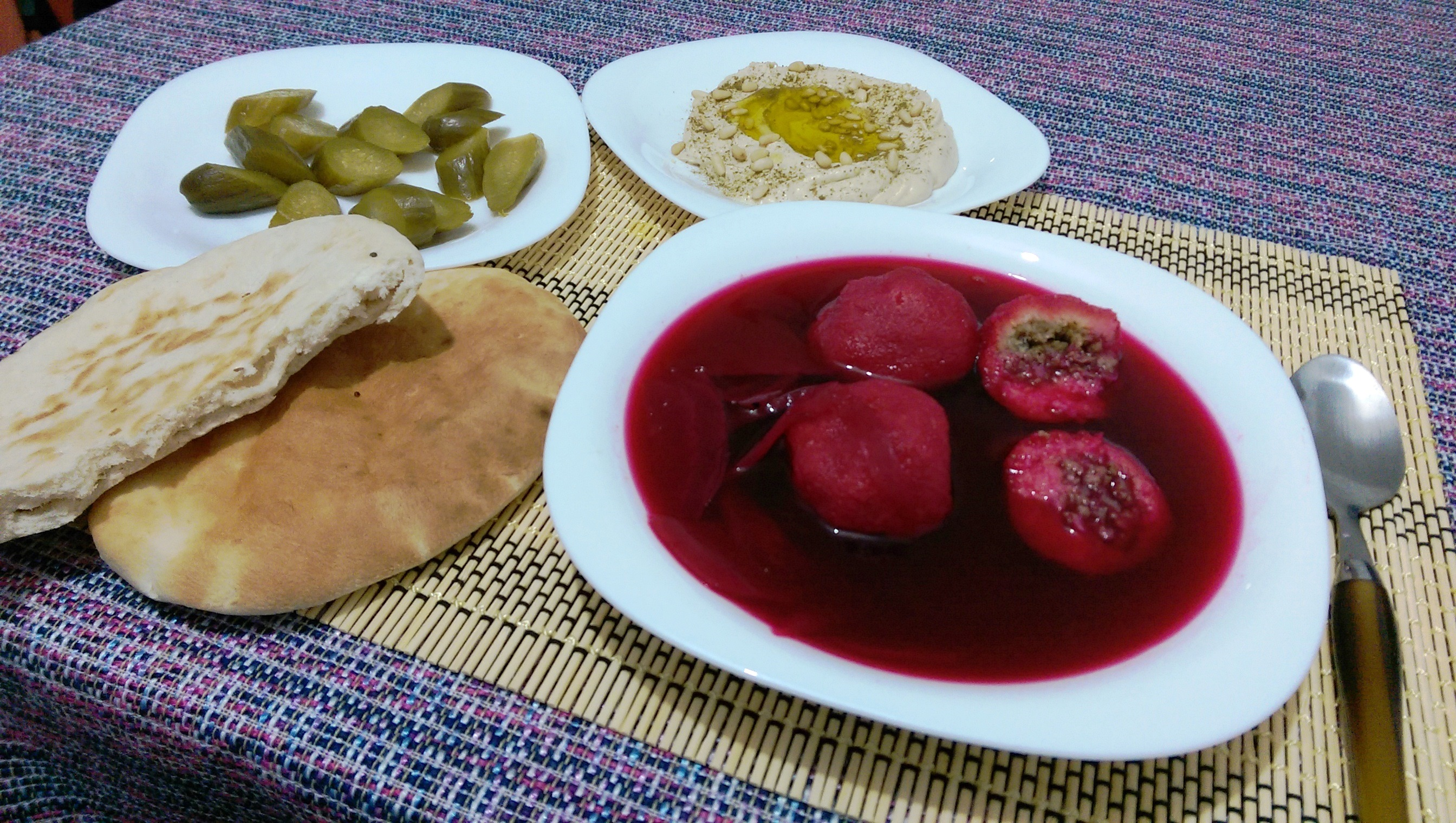
Red kubbeh soup with pita, pickled cucumbers and hummus

Kubbeh, a dumpling soup of Iraqi Jewish origin, is an iconic dish of Jerusalem cuisine, often enjoyed as a pre-Shabbat meal during Friday lunch. Starting in the 1980s, this dish, which had been mostly eaten within the small Kurdish Jewish community, began appearing in simple eateries around Mahane Yehuda market, and gradually became popular among a wider audience. The dish is served at restaurants such as Azura, Morduch, Ima and Rachmo. Popular versions include kubbeh hamusta, a sour soup, and kubbeh selek, made with a red beet broth.

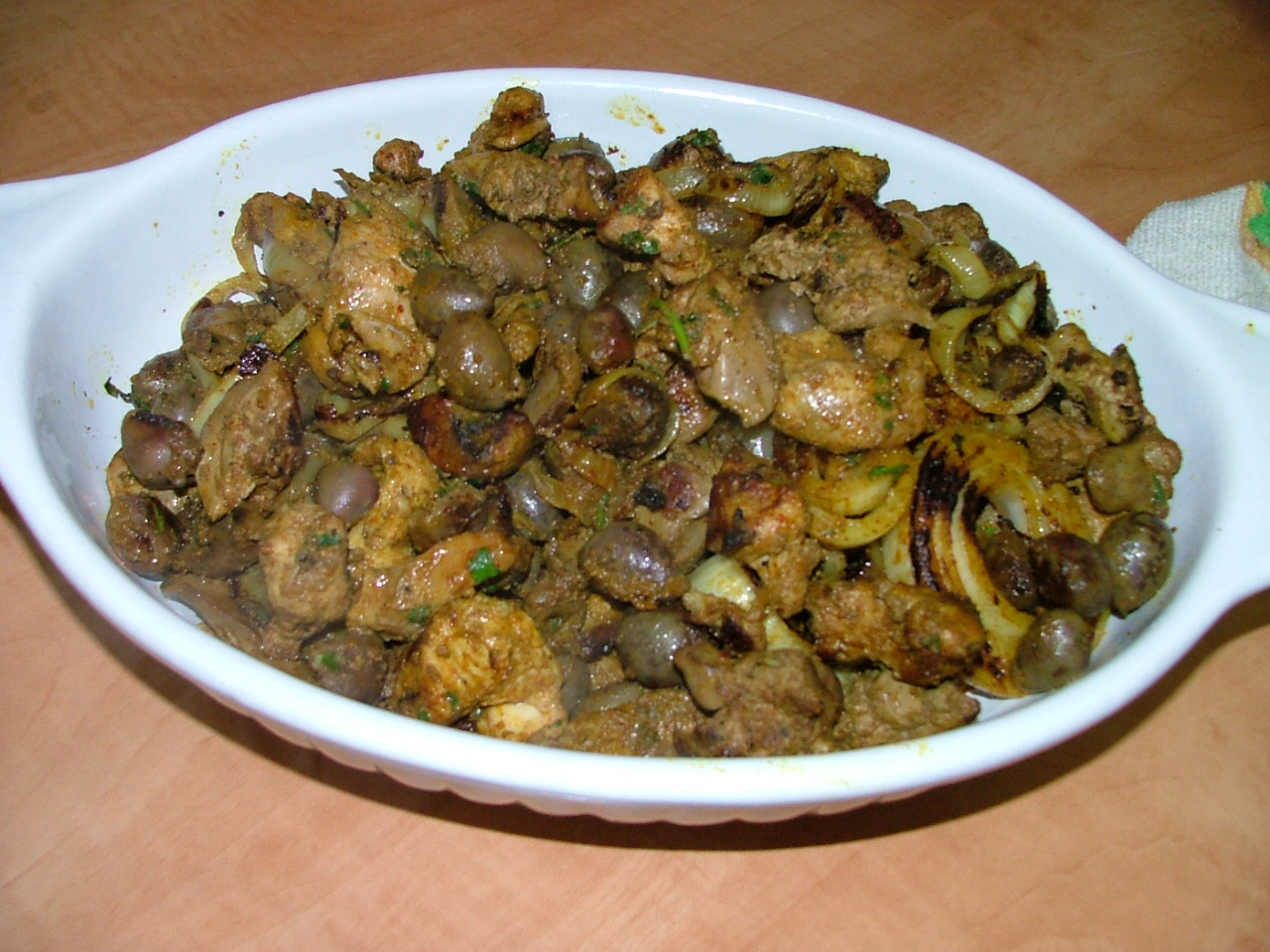
Jerusalem mixed-grill, a speciality of Jerusalem including chicken thighs, hearts, and livers, caramelized onions and spices

Jerusalem mixed grill is a dish believed to have originated from the Mahane Yehuda Market. It consists of chicken thighs, hearts, and livers cooked with baharat, a Middle Eastern spice blend typically containing cinnamon, allspice, coriander, black pepper, cardamom, and cloves, along with caramelized onions. Traditionally prepared on a griddle, it can be made in a regular pan as well and can also be served in a pita.

Another popular dish in Jerusalem is sofrito, a stew of Sephardic Jewish origin. Beef sofrito, a mixture of beef, potatoes and spices, is served in places such as Azura and Barood. Azura, a renowned family restaurant in the Mahana Yehuda Market, often hailed as one of the country's finest "workers' restaurants", serves alongside sofrito other traditional dishes such as kubbeh and lung stew. Barood, located within the historic Feingold courtyard and established in 1995, is a gastropub known for its Sephardic cuisine, which also includes pastelikos, boycos and leek fritters.

Makaroni hamin is a Jerusalemite variation of hamin (comparable to the Ashkenazi cholent), a slow-cooked stew traditionally served on Shabbat. This dish incorporates pasta (usually macaroni or bucatini), alongside chicken.

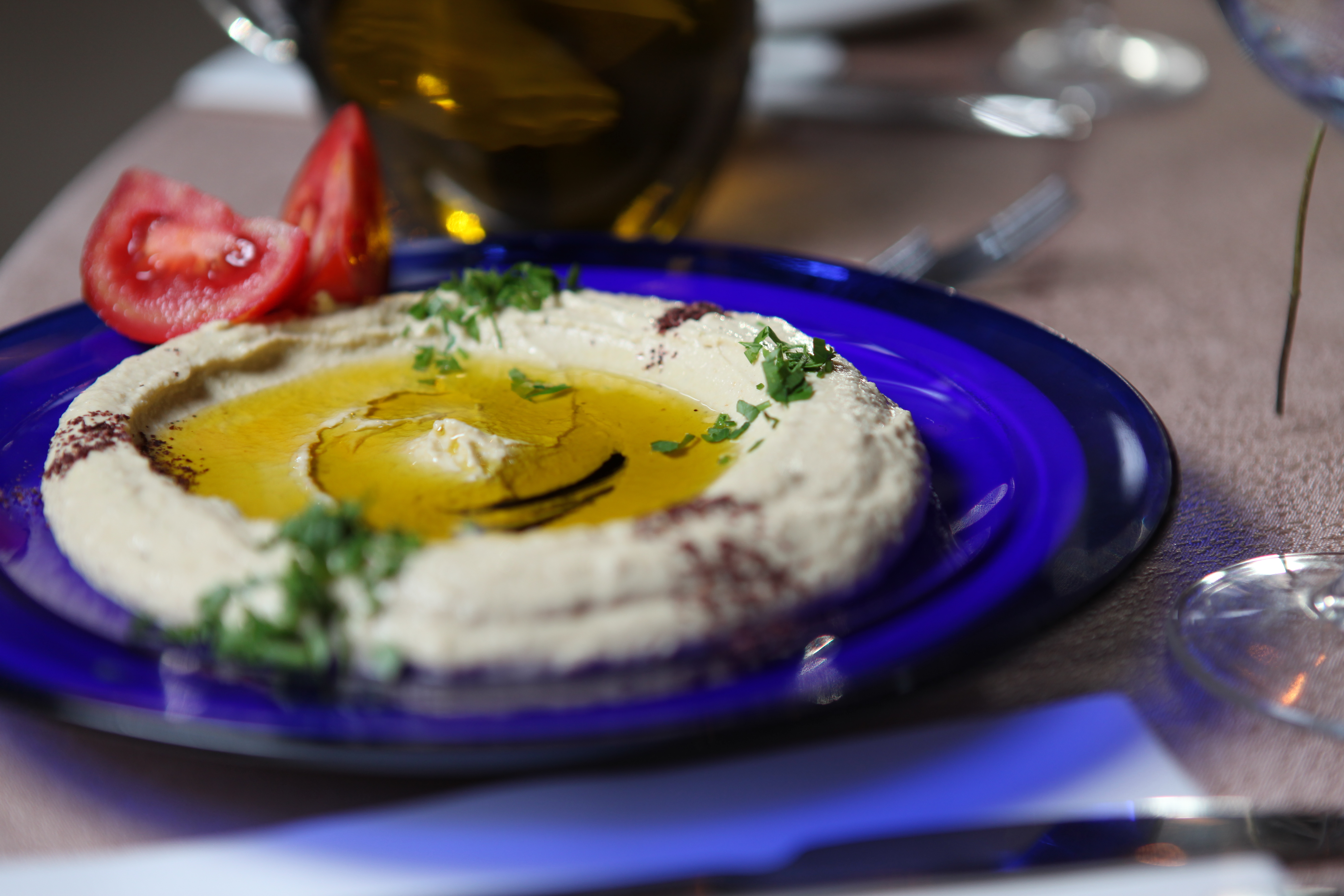
Hummus served in The Eucalyptus restaurant, at Jerusalem's Artists' Colony

In the Old City of Jerusalem, several popular hummus eateries draw crowds, including Abu Shukri, Lina, Abu Kamal, and Arafat. Abu Shukri, which Yotam Ottolenghi and Sami Tamimi call "a famous hummus spot" in the area, is known for its hand-prepared hummus, also offers dishes like msabbaha (whole chickpeas mixed with tahini) and ful (spiced fava beans). Due to limited seating, it's common to find locals lining up for takeaway breakfasts. The Butchers' Market is home to Kebab Abu Shaheen, a kebab restaurant managed by descendants of a Turkish Muslim family believed to have founded the establishment during the Ottoman period.

== Desserts ==
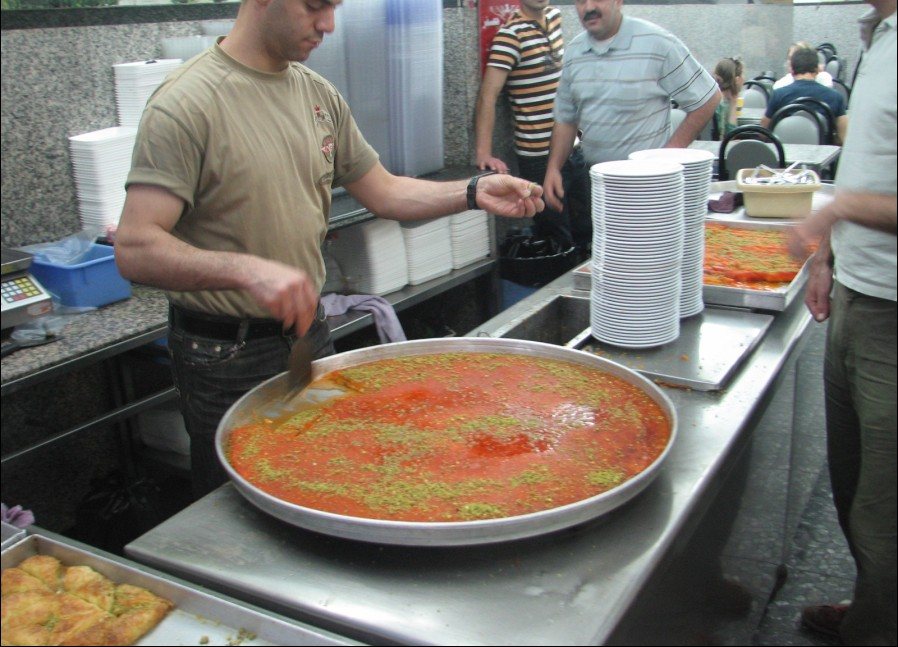
Knafeh served at Jafar Sweets, a shop in the Old City of Jerusalem

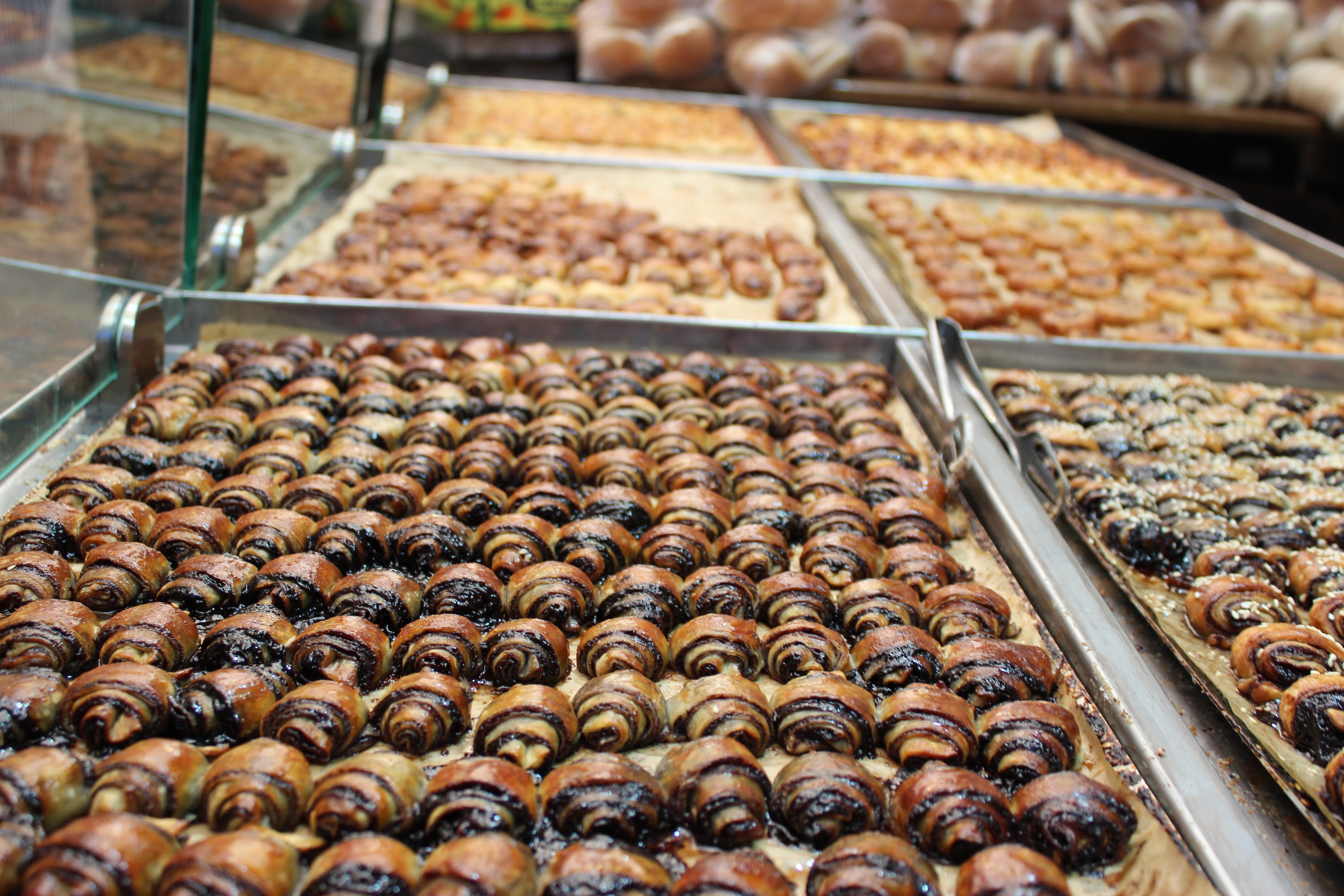
Rugelach and other sweet pastries at the Mahane Yehuda Market

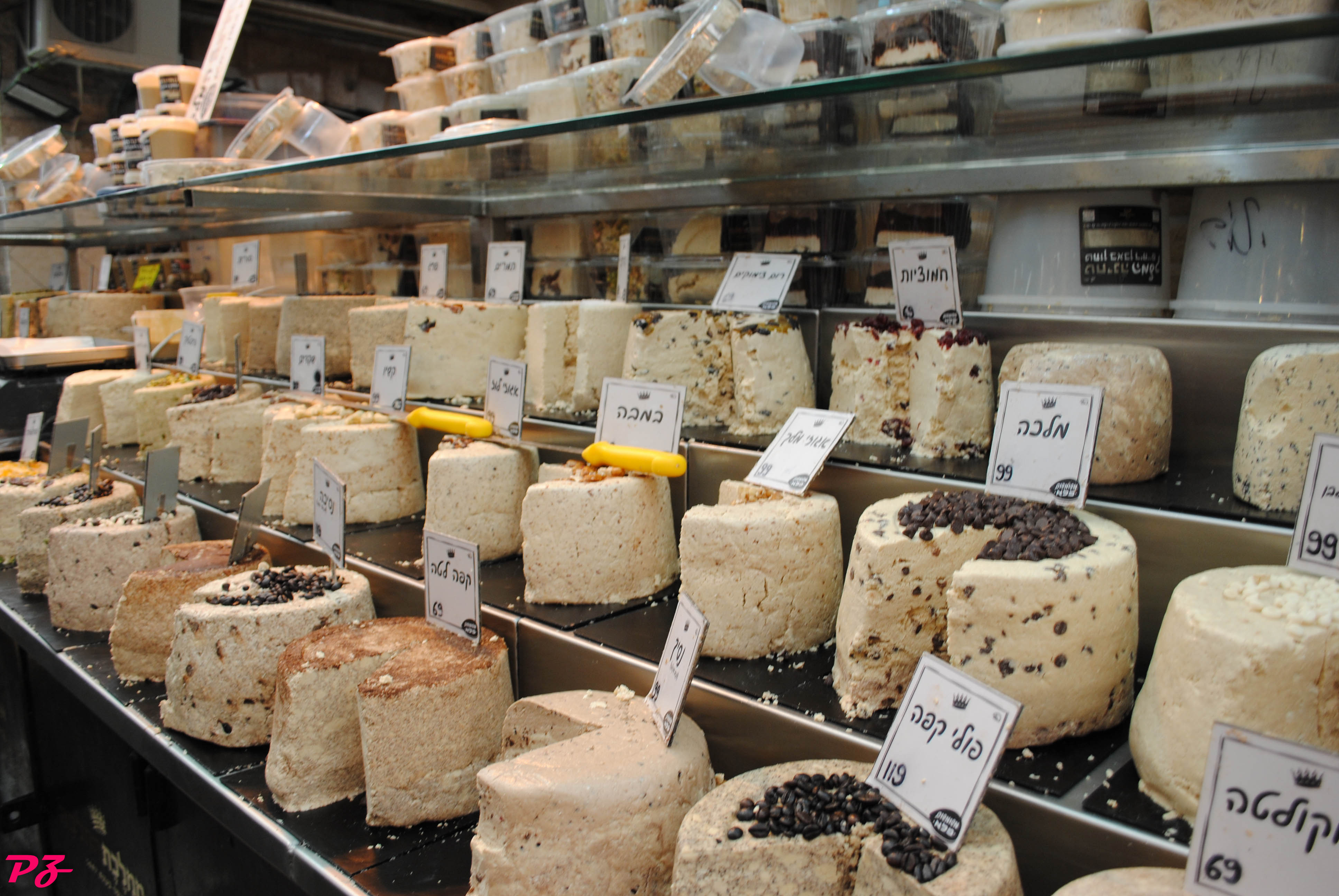
Halva of various tastes, including chocolate, rum and raisins, bamba, and coffee beans

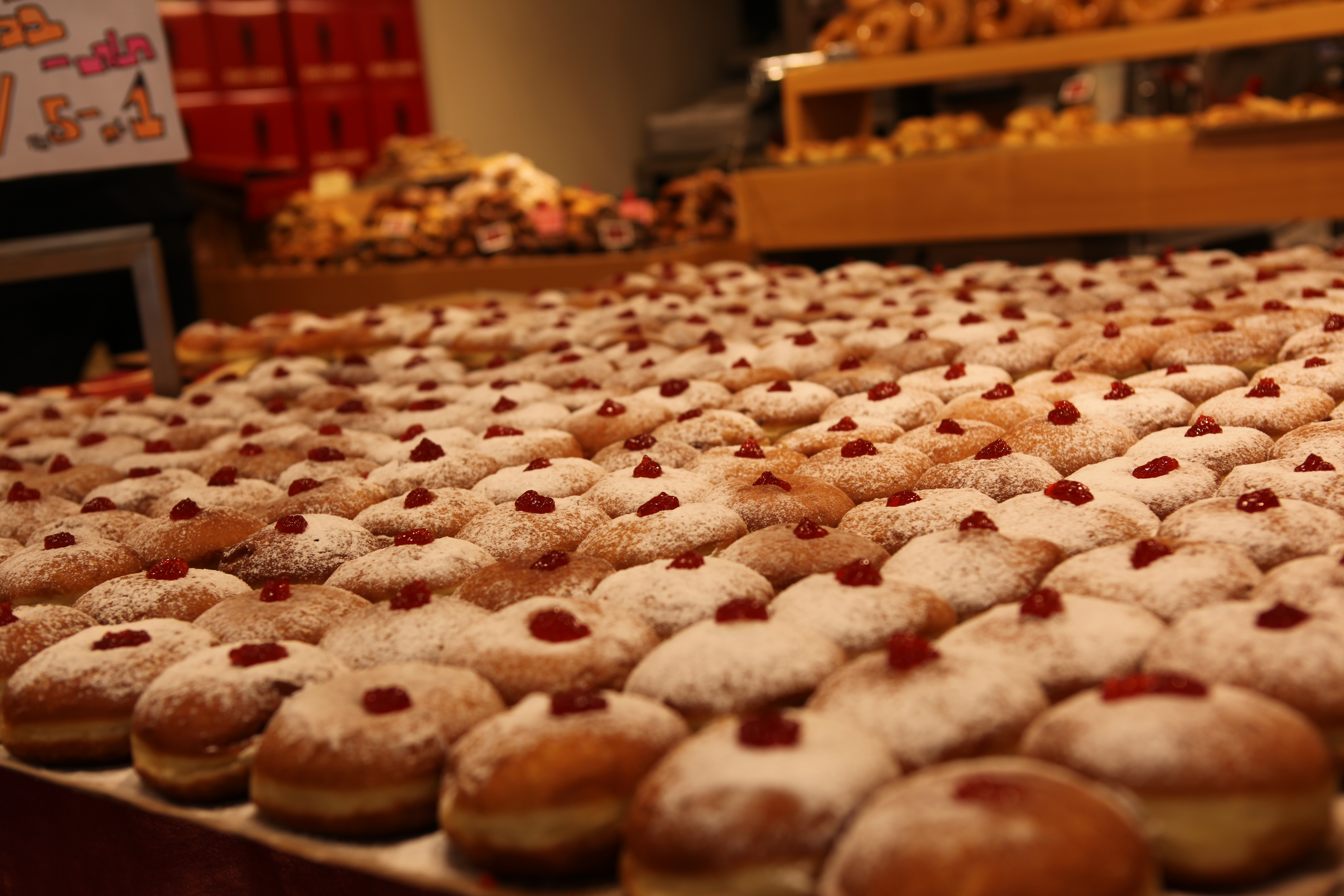
Sufganiyot, jelly-doughnuts eaten in the Jewish holiday of Hannukah, sold in the Jewish Quarter

Traditional Palestinian desserts sold in Jerusalem sweet shops include helbeh and hareeseh, both made from semolina cakes. Another Palestinian dessert, knafeh, is made with melted cheese and pastry dough. One well-known knafeh shop is Jafar Sweets, established in 1951 in the Old City's Christian Quarter. Mutabbaq is yet another specialty dessert of Jerusalem, it was first pioneered in the 19th Century and has been a staple since.

In 2017, the first kosher knafeh shop, Ir David, opened in the Mahane Yehuda Market, quickly gaining popularity and inspiring the establishment of additional kosher knafeh shops. Rugelach is also popular, notably at Marzipan, a bakery known for its gooey chocolate version of the pastry, which attracts large crowds.

Café Kadosh, situated in downtown Jerusalem, is renowned as one of Israel's most popular and long-standing bakeries. Established in 1967, this family-run establishment has earned acclaim for its classic European-style baked goods and dairy cuisine. The café is also notable for its sufganiyot during the Jewish holiday of Hanukkah, which attract large crowds each year.

In 2023, The Jerusalem Post reported that a number of ice cream parlors had opened in the preceding decade.

== International cuisine ==
Alongside traditional Jerusalemite cuisine, an increasing number of restaurants in Jerusalem offer international fare. Notable examples include the Austrian Hospice in the Old City, renowned for serving Austrian specialties like veal schnitzel and apple strudel. In the Jewish Quarter, a Korean restaurant offers Korean dishes such as bibimbap, gimbap, tteokbokki, japchae and kimchi. In the Mahane Yehuda Market, new restaurants have emerged offering a variety of kosher-certified international cuisines, including Georgian, Lebanese, American and South American.

== Events and festivals ==
In 1992, the Tower of David museum held an innovative food exhibition named Ta-Arucha, curated by renowned food writer Sherry Ansky. Around 2021, the Tower of David initiated "Eating in Jerusalem", an interdisciplinary historical culinary project which includes a weekly newsletter, stories and recipes shared via WhatsApp, a blog featuring scholarly articles on local ingredients, and in-person food tours in the Old City and Mahane Yehuda Market.

In the 2010s and 2020s, the Jerusalem Food Truck Festival became a prominent summer event. The festival, held during July and August nights, features food trucks where top chefs from esteemed city restaurants prepared dishes. Alongside culinary offerings, the festival also includes shows and light exhibitions. Originally held at Ben Hinnom Valley Park, in 2024 the venue was relocated to Armon HaNatsiv park.

In 2017, Palestinian chef Izzeldin Bukhari established Sacred Cuisine, a company that organizes food tours, supper clubs, cooking classes, and other events centered on vegetarian Palestinian cuisine in Jerusalem. One of his most popular tours explores the Old City and features foods like hummus, kras beid, freekeh, za'atar, mutabbaq, and halva.
