= Buccellato di Lucca =

Italian sweet bread

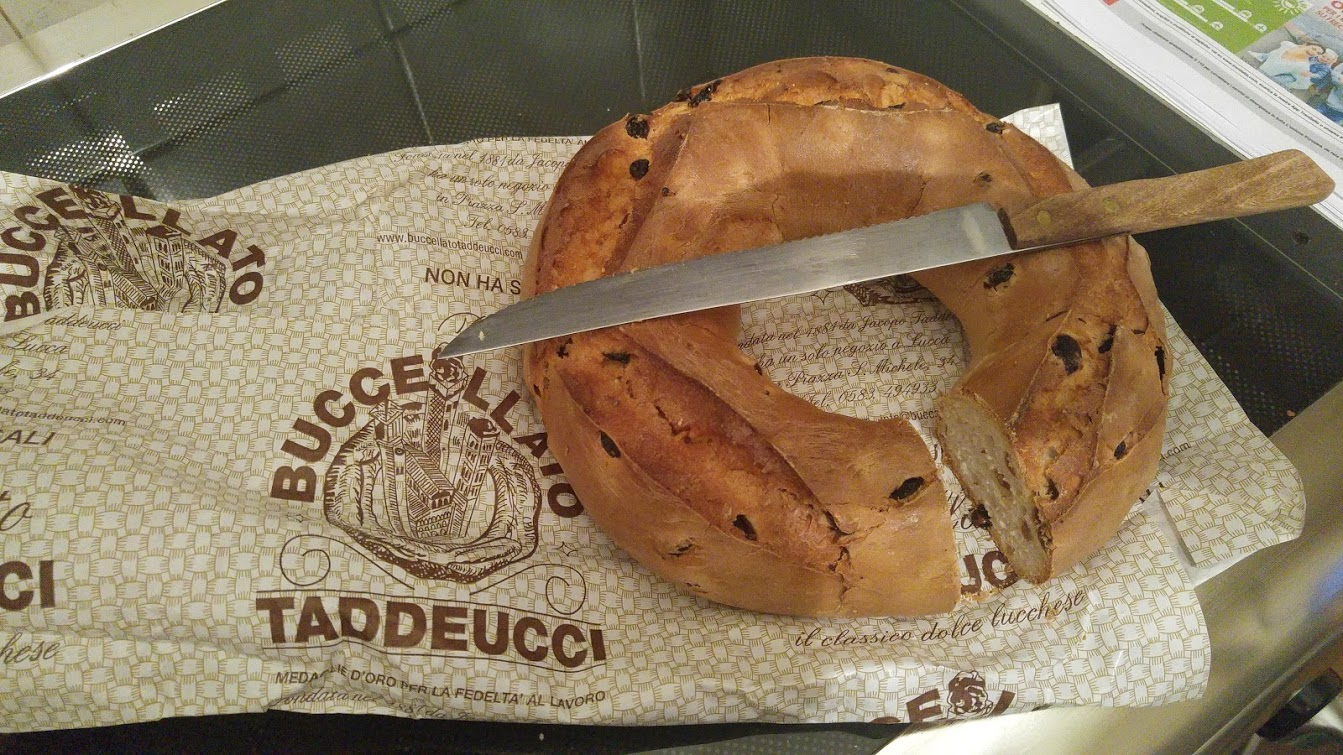
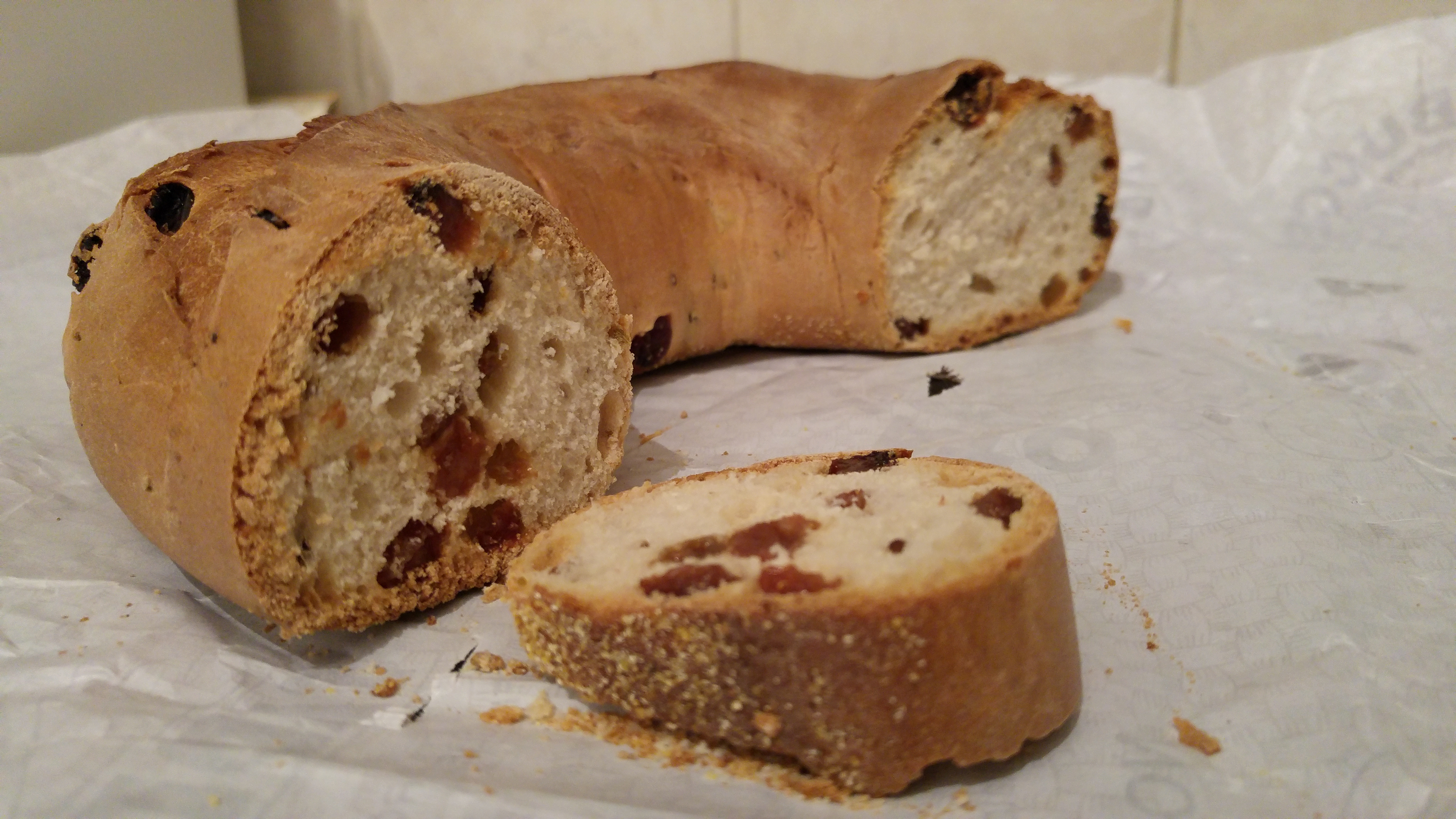
- Type: Sweet bread
- Place of origin: Italy
- Region or state: Lucca, Tuscany
- Main ingredients: Sultanas, aniseed

Buccellato di Lucca is an Italian sweet bread, originating from Lucca, Tuscany. While eaten throughout the year, it is associated with the Feast of the Cross in September.

The name derives from the Latin buccella (lit. 'morsel'). The ancient Roman buccellatum was a round loaf of bread. The modern buccellato di Lucca retains its original ring shape, and is widely found on Luccan tables as a sweet Sunday treat, carried home on the forearm after attending Mass. It is also found in elongated shape.

Buccellato di Lucca's sweet flavor, dark brown color, and gloss result from a sugar and egg glaze applied to the crust. There is a slight cut on the upper crust to facilitate the cake's rising. The interior is soft, filled with sultana raisins and aniseed.

197 bakeries in Lucca produce buccellato di Lucca. It is often consumed with wine, Vin Santo, cream and coffee, ricotta, or rum. It may be eaten at breakfast.

== See also ==
Media related to Buccellato di Lucca at Wikimedia Commons

- List of Italian desserts and pastries
- Buccellato
- Ka'ak
