= Jerusalem mixed grill =

Israeli grilled meat dish

Jerusalem mixed grill or meorav Yerushalmi (in Hebrew)
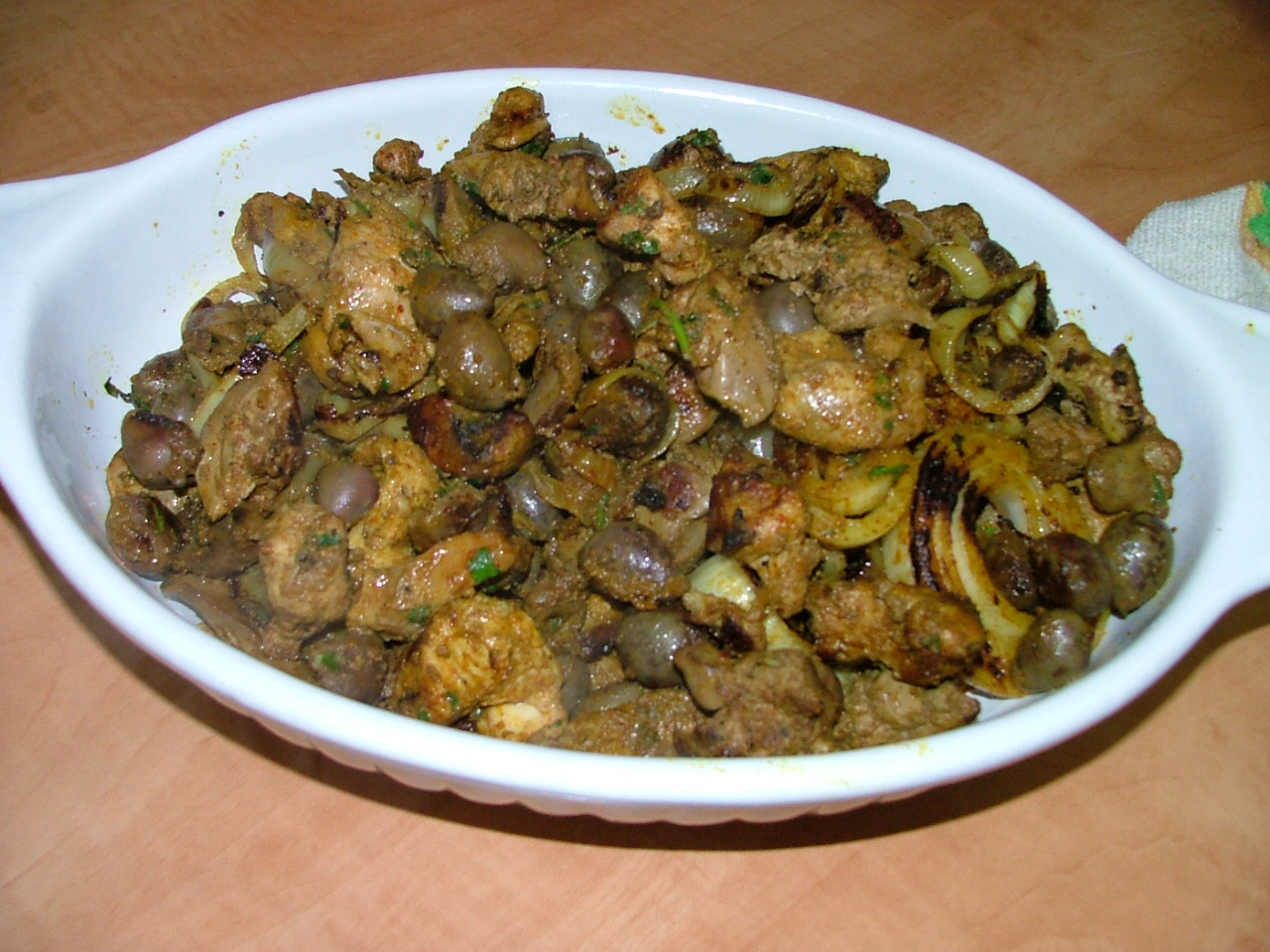
- Course: Main dish/Street food
- Place of origin: Israel
- Region or state: Jerusalem
- Serving temperature: Hot
- Main ingredients: chicken hearts, spleens and liver mixed with bits of lamb, onion

Jerusalem mixed grill (Hebrew: מעורב ירושלמי, romanized: me'orav Yerushalmi) is a grilled meat dish considered a specialty of Jerusalem. It consists of chicken hearts, spleens and often liver and chicken or turkey meat cooked on a flat grill, seasoned with onion, garlic, black pepper, cumin, turmeric, olive oil and coriander.

The dish is said to have been invented at the Mahane Yehuda Market, with various restaurants claiming to be the originators. It is considered by some as Israel's national dish.

In 2009, Israeli chefs created a giant portion that weighed in at 440 pounds (200 kilos), winning a Guinness world record for the largest Jerusalem mixed grill. They also prepared the world's smallest dish: Jerusalem mixed grill in a pita the size of a coin.

According to the late Haaretz food critic Daniel Rogov, world-renowned chefs have pleaded with one of the steakhouses, Sima, for the recipe, which includes a secret ingredient described as "Georgian pepper".

A variation of the dish may have the meorav Yerushalmi thinly chopped and then rolled into phyllo cigars which are then fried; it is common to serve meorav Yerushalmi that way at weddings.

== See also ==
- Israeli cuisine
- Mixed grill
- List of meat dishes
- Jewish cuisine
- Culture of Israel
- Cuisine of Jerusalem
- Israeli inventions and discoveries
