= Buccellato =

Italian Christmas cake

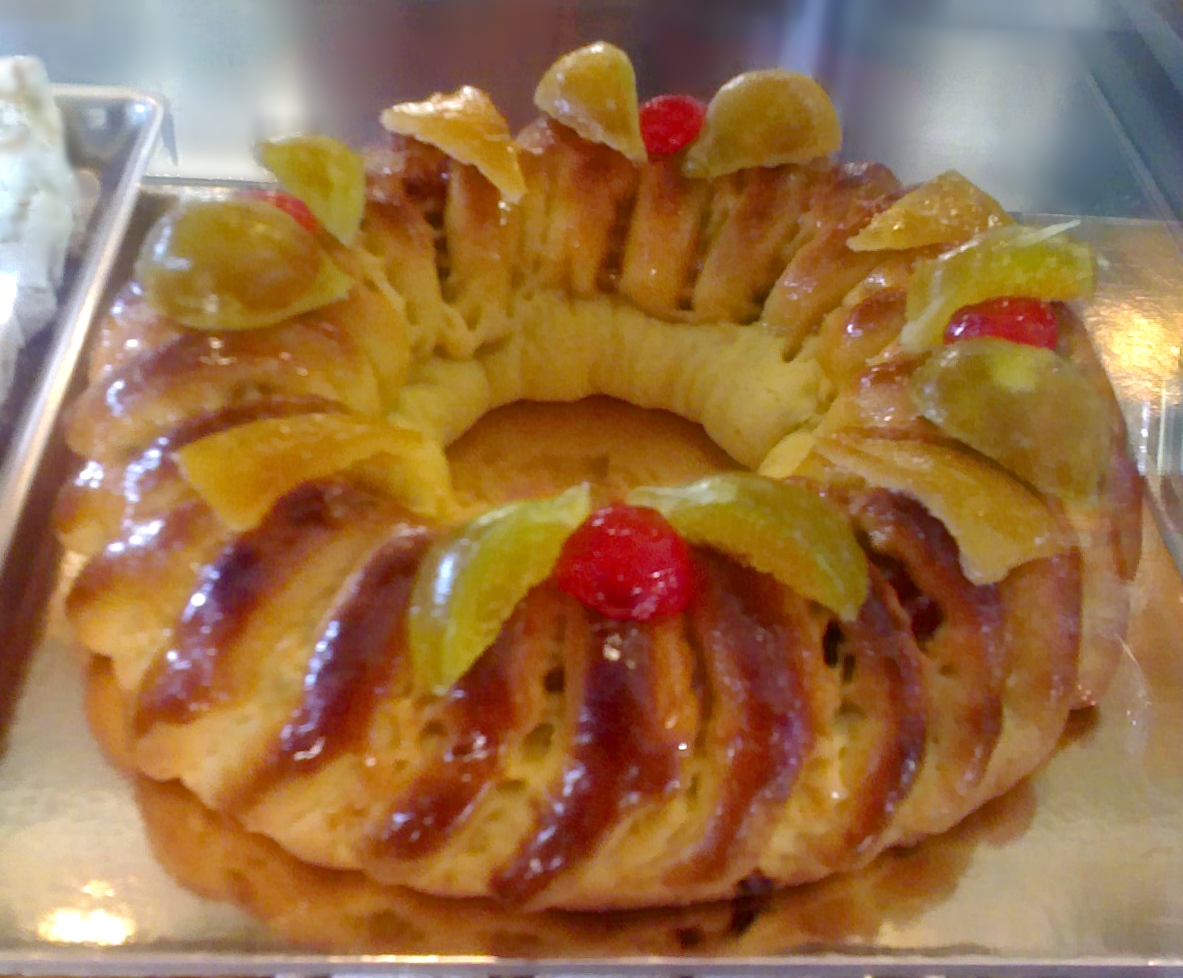
- Type: Cake
- Place of origin: Italy
- Region or state: Sicily
- Main ingredients: Candied fruit

A buccellato (Italian: [buttʃelˈlaːto]) is a Sicilian circular cake filled with figs and nuts. In Sicily, it is traditionally associated with Christmas. It is not to be confused with the distinct but similar traditional Lucchese cake of the same name, the buccellato di Lucca, although both are ring-shaped sweet breads that contain candied fruit peels.

== See also ==
Media related to Buccellato at Wikimedia Commons

- List of Italian desserts and pastries
- List of cakes
- Buccellato di Lucca
