= Izzeldin Bukhari =

Palestinian chef

- عزالدين البخاري
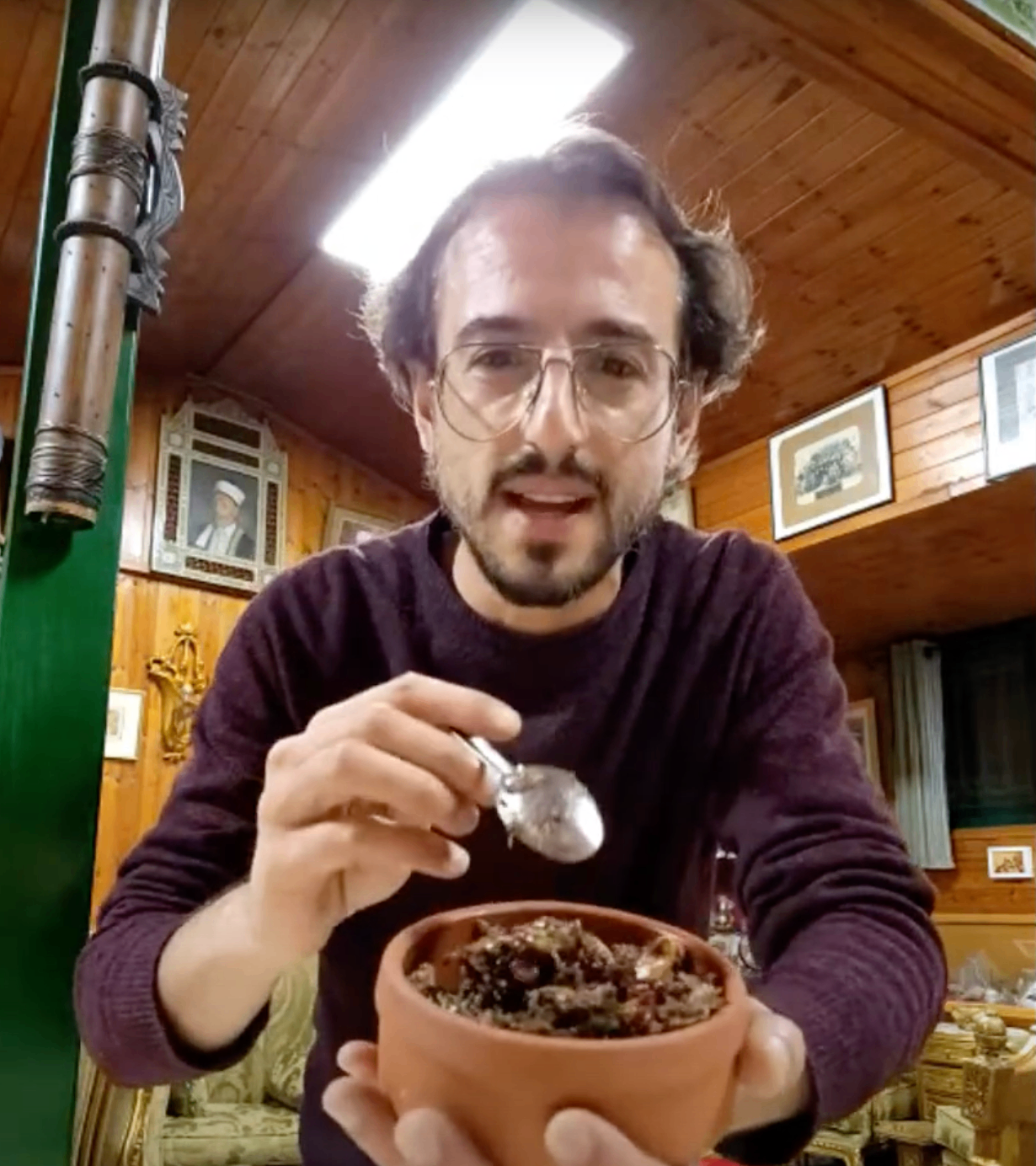
- Born: 1984 or 1985 (age 40–41); Jerusalem
- Occupation: chef, tour guide
- Known for: founding Sacred Cuisine
- Website: https://sacred-cuisine.com

Izzeldin Bukhari (Arabic: عزالدين البخاري) is a Palestinian chef from Jerusalem. In 2017, he founded Sacred Cuisine, which organizes food tours, supper clubs, cooking classes, and other events to promote vegetarian Palestinian cuisine.

== Early life and family ==
In 1616, Bukhari's paternal ancestors immigrated to the Old City of Jerusalem from Bukhara, Uzbekistan, to open a zawiya or Sufi religious center. Several of his family members, including his father, were Sufi sheikhs. One of his ancestors is Imam Muhammad Ismail al-Bukhari. His mother was born in Gaza after his maternal grandparents were displaced there from Ramleh in 1948.

Bukhari was born around 1985. He grew up in Jerusalem with 3 sisters, interacting with people from various backgrounds and countries who had come to visit his family's zawiya. In 2010, Bukhari's father died. Bukhari is based in Jerusalem but has family members living in the Gaza Strip, including his sister. By the end of October 2023, 31 of his family members had been killed and others had been injured by Israeli airstrikes in the Gaza war. He has spoken with news media about the difficulty of maintaining contact with his family in Gaza and worrying for their safety.

== Career ==
Bukhari is a self-taught chef. In 2009, he moved to Arizona in the United States. Away from home, he missed Palestinian food and began cooking it with spices mailed to him by his family.

In 2015, Bukhari returned to Jerusalem. Two years later, he founded Sacred Cuisine, a company that organizes food tours, supper clubs, cooking classes, and other events centered on vegetarian Palestinian cuisine. One of his most popular tours explores the Old City of Jerusalem and features foods like hummus, kras beid, freekeh, za'atar, mutabbaq, and halva. Past tour participants include Jamie Oliver. Through Sacred Cuisine, Bukhari promotes Somi or vegetarian Palestinian food and disseminates his knowledge about Palestinian food history, culture, and produce. According to Bukhari, traditional Palestinian cuisine is primarily vegetarian. He creates vegetarian versions of dishes; for example, he replaces the meat in mahashi with cauliflower, walnuts, and mushrooms and replaces the chicken in mussakhan with eggplant and mushrooms. Around 2024, Bukhari began hosting Sacred Cuisine events in Europe.

In 2020, Bukhari was featured in "Colonising the Tastebuds", a short documentary created by Mondoweiss and Baladi – Rooted Resistance. The film shows him talking about struggling to access food grown by Palestinian farmers due to the Israeli occupation, a topic he has also discussed elsewhere. Additionally, he discusses food as a key part of his identity as a Palestinian: “Just talking about food can really reflect [...] the history of the Palestinian in this land. They [Israel] are trying to teach us to give up on being Palestinian. And we are saying ‘I can’t.’" Bukhari published the story ""The Ballad of Lulu and Amina"—from Jerusalem to Gaza" in the anthology, Daybreak in Gaza: Stories of Palestinian Lives and Cultures (2024). In it he recounts the time he tried to take his cat from Jerusalem through an Israeli checkpoint to his sister's wedding in Gaza.

== See also ==
- Palestinian cuisine
- Culture of Palestine
- Cuisine of Jerusalem
