= Sofrito (stew) =

Traditional Sephardic Jewish stew

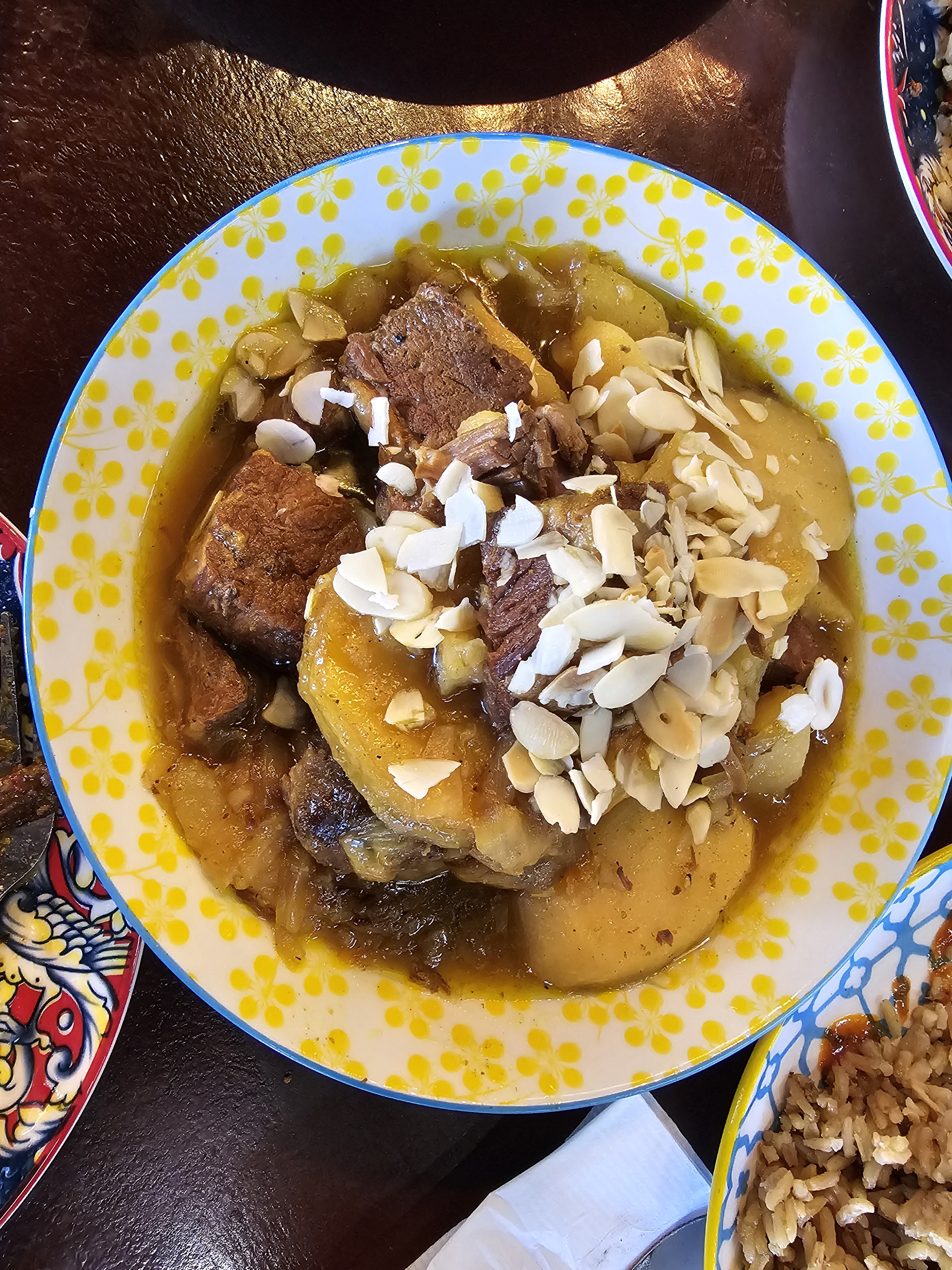
- Course: Stew
- Region or state: Sephardic Jewish communities, Israel
- Serving temperature: Hot
- Main ingredients: Chicken, lamb, beef, potatoes

Sofrito is a Sephardi-Jewish meat (lamb, beef, chicken) stew.

== History ==
Sofrito was prepared in Sephardi Jewish communities that were expelled from Spain, and traditionally eaten in the Balkans, the Levant, Turkey and the Maghreb.

Recipes for sofrito can vary widely. Claudia Roden's recipe calls for sunflower oil, lemon juice, and small amounts of turmeric, white pepper, and cardamom and little else, differentiating it from other recipes that incorporate paprika, onions, and garlic, or different spice mixes like baharat. Roden's recipe may be more typical of Egyptian styles of sofrito, which are subtler, "with a bit of allspice and/or cardamom".

Today it is eaten in Israel.

== See also ==
- Sephardi Jewish cuisine
- Israeli cuisine
