= Jerusalem bagel =

Type of bread made in Jerusalem

Jerusalem Bagel
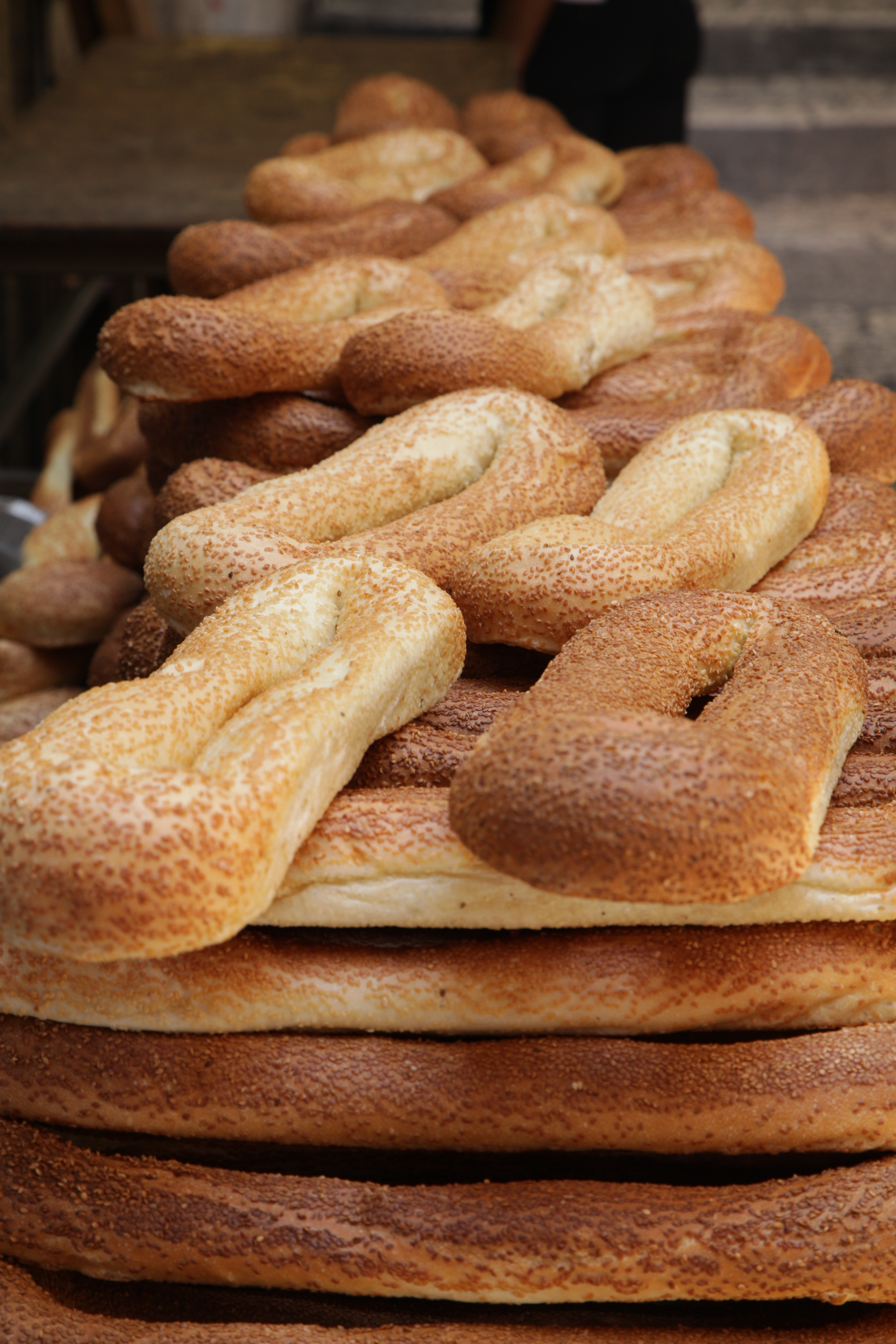
- Jerusalem bagels
- Alternative names: Kaʿak al-Quds
- Type: Bread
- Place of origin: Jerusalem
- Associated cuisine: Cuisine of Jerusalem
- Main ingredients: Flour, yeast, sugar, water, sesame seeds

Jerusalem bagel or Jerusalem ka'ak (Arabic: كعك القدس, romanized: ka'ak al-quds; Hebrew: בייגל ירושלמי, romanized: beigel yerushalmi) is a type of bread baked in Jerusalem. It has a ring shape but is otherwise only baked and not boiled unlike a traditional boiled bagel. It is related to Middle Eastern ka'ak bread.

Typically, this is a yeasted, crusty bread which is shaped into an oblong ring and covered in sesame seeds. The dough has a lighter texture than a traditional bagel. It can be sliced and served with various toppings. Countless variations of it exist across the Eastern Mediterranean, but the oblong one from Jerusalem remains the most iconic and is thought to date back to the Middle Ages.

== History ==
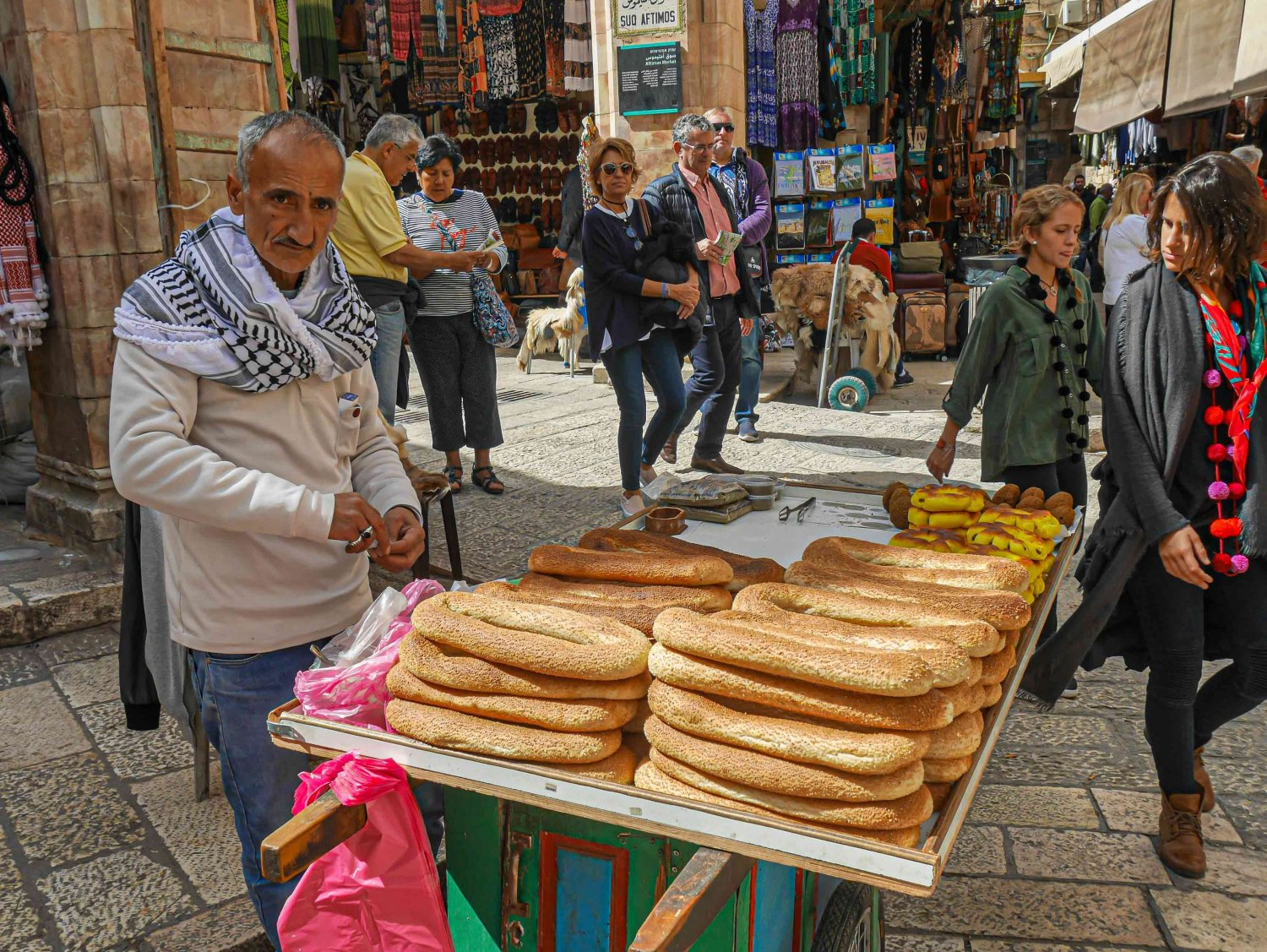
Palestinian man with a cart full of Jerusalem Ka'ek

=== Ottoman Period ===
While the precise origins are unknown, Jerusalem bagels are often traced back to the Ottoman period; similarities are drawn to Turkish simits. Ottoman records (sijil) from the 16th and 17th centuries contained references to a bread known as ka'k, this bread is sometimes described as hard and dry, and sometimes described as a soft bagel.

According to one story, a primitive form of Jerusalem ka'ak first spread in the city during the visit of the Ottoman Sultan Suleiman the Magnificent's wife Roxelana to Jerusalem in 1552, when she ordered the creation of the "Khaski Sultan" charitable kitchen.

=== 20th century ===
According to historian Gil Marks, the modern Jerusalem bagel may have originated among the Arab residents of Jaffa city around the year 1948, the original bread was skinnier than the modern versions.

A photo taken on the 14th of July, 1967 shows a boy selling sesame coated, ring-shaped (but not elongated), "bagels" in the alleys of the Old city of Jerusalem. Ka'ak-al-quds likely became popular among Israelis following the Six-Day War in 1967, when Israelis gained access to the old city and its souks, after which it became known as the Jerusalem bagel. Journalistic reports date the oblong shaped bagel to the 1990s or 1980s.

As of the 2020s, there were over 20 operating bakeries making ka'ak al-Quds, some of the bakeries making ka'ak have been operating for 120 years, with one having operated for 200.

== Culture ==
Jerusalem is frequently said to have the best Jerusalem bagels, as such, the inhabitants of Jerusalem would gift Jerusalem bagels to those living outside the city. In the old city, ka'ak-cart sellers push their carts around the old city yelling "ka'ak" to attract customers. It is often said that the unique aroma of this bread in Jerusalem is due to it being baked on olive wood. Traditionally, it is eaten for breakfast, often with eggs, falafel, and za'atar.

=== Politics ===
Ka'ak al-Quds has been described as a symbol of Palestinian identity. Some Palestinians argue that describing ka'ak al-Quds as an Israeli food constitutes cultural appropriation.

In September 2025, the Palestinian Authority submitted a nomination to UNESCO's Intangible Cultural Heritage list for ka'ak al-Quds, presenting the Jerusalem bagel as part of Palestinian culinary heritage and a symbol of Palestinian national identity and connection to the city. The nomination described the bread as "part of the collective memory of Palestinians". It also attributed the decline of traditional bakeries in the Old City to Israeli taxation and licensing restrictions imposed since 1967, describing these measures as part of the "Judaization of Jerusalem". The application was scheduled for consideration by UNESCO's Intergovernmental Committee for the Safeguarding of the Intangible Cultural Heritage in November–December 2026.

The nomination attracted criticism from some Israeli commentators, who objected to its presentation of the bread as Palestinian heritage.

== See also ==
- Ka'ak
- Biscuit
- Biscuit (bread)
- Cuisine of Jerusalem
- Palestinian cuisine
