= Ka'ak =

Baked goods from the Arab world and Middle East

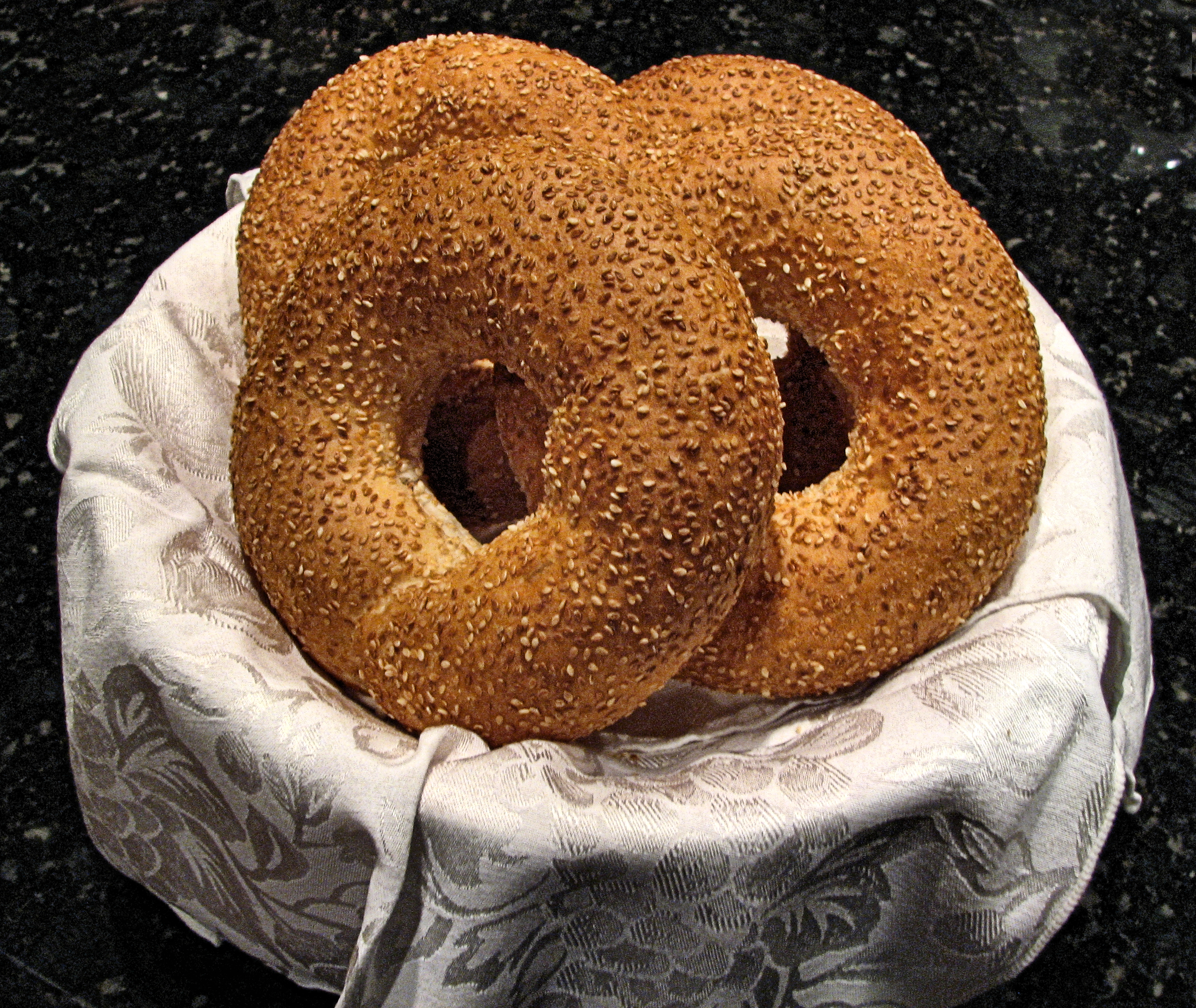
- Ka'ak bread
- Region or state: Middle East
- Main ingredients: Wheat flour, vegetable oil, eggs, sugar, black cumin or sesame seeds, egg yolk, water, salt
- Variations: Ka'ak el eid, ka'ak asawer, ka'ak bi ajwa, ka'ak al-quds

Ka'ak (Arabic: كَعك [kaʕk], also transliterated kaak), is a baked good of varying types produced throughout the Arab world and the Near East. The bread, in Middle Eastern countries, is similar to a dry and hardened biscuit and mostly ring-shaped. A similar pastry called kue kaak is also popular in Indonesia. Some varieties found in the Levant are soft leavened breads coated with sesame seeds.

== History ==
Ka'ak is mentioned in the 10th century Kitāb al-Ṭabīkh by Ibn Sayyar al-Warraq. It is also attested to in the 13th-century Syrian cookbook Kitab al-Wuslah ila l-habib, which gives three recipes for ka'ak. It also mentions date-filled, ring-shaped ka'ak cookies.

== Variations ==
=== Bread rings ===
Ka'ak is a common ring-shaped bread in Levantine cuisine covered with sesame seeds. Fermented chickpeas are used as a leavening agent. Widely sold by street vendors, it is usually eaten as a snack or for breakfast with za'atar.

Tunisian Jews also make a slightly sweet-and-salty version of the pastry, but do not use a yeast-based dough. In Egypt, a variant made with almonds, kahk bi loz, is often served at weddings.

==== Jordan ====
In Jordan, sesame-coated ka'ak bread is popular, where it is available in different shapes and size, and often used for sandwiches.

==== Lebanon ====
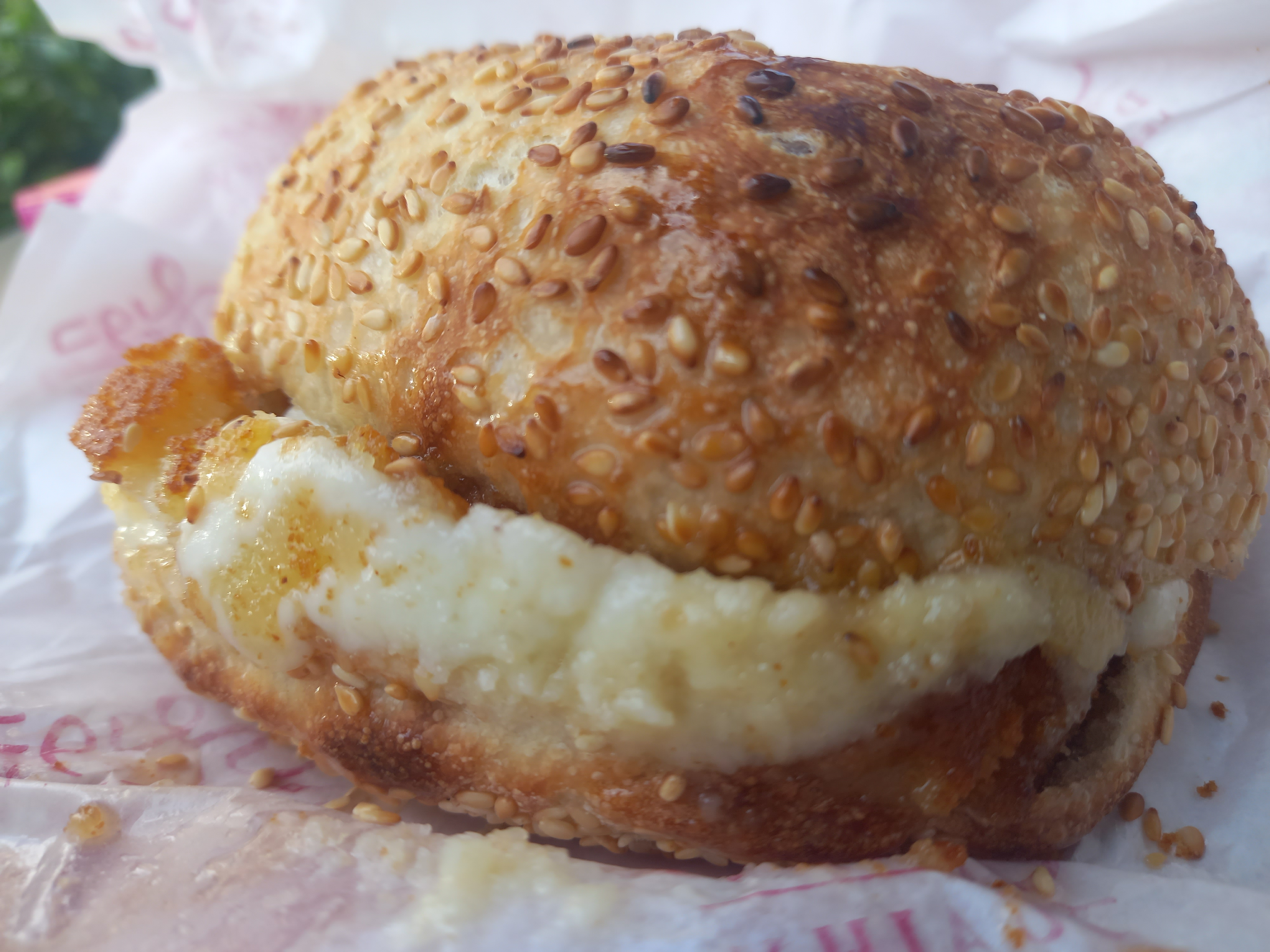
Lebanese ka'ak with knafeh

In Lebanon, ka'ak bread rings are made of sweet dough rolled into ropes and formed into rings and topped with sesame seeds. Instead of za'atar, after baking, it is glazed with milk and sugar and then dried. They are also shaped into flat rings with uneven widths along the ring, resembling a handbag, and they are sold on wheeled carriages where they are carried by being hung on a pole by the ring hole. It is used to make kaak knafeh, where knafeh is sandwiched in a piece of kaak bread.

Lebanese ka'ak also goes by kaak alasreya (Arabic: كعك العصرية) or kaakit al asroniyeh (Arabic: كعكة العصرونية, lit. 'afternoon ka'ak').

==== East Jerusalem ====
In East Jerusalem, it is sometimes served alongside oven-baked eggs and falafel. Palestinians from Hebron to Jenin consider ka'ak al-Quds (Jerusalem ka'ak) to be a unique specialty good, and those from the city or visiting there often buy several loaves to give to others outside the city as a gift.

=== Sweets ===
Sweet semolina ka'ak are made in the Middle East to celebrate special occasions.

Arab Christians, primary among them Palestinian Christians (including those who live in the Palestinian diaspora) and Lebanese Christians, make semolina ka'ak to celebrate Easter. The pastries are often shaped as wreaths and symbolize the crown of thorns that Christians believe Jesus of Nazareth was wearing on the day of his crucifixion.

Sweet semolina ka'ak are also a feature of the Muslim feasts of Eid al-Fitr and Eid al-Adha.

==== Algeria ====
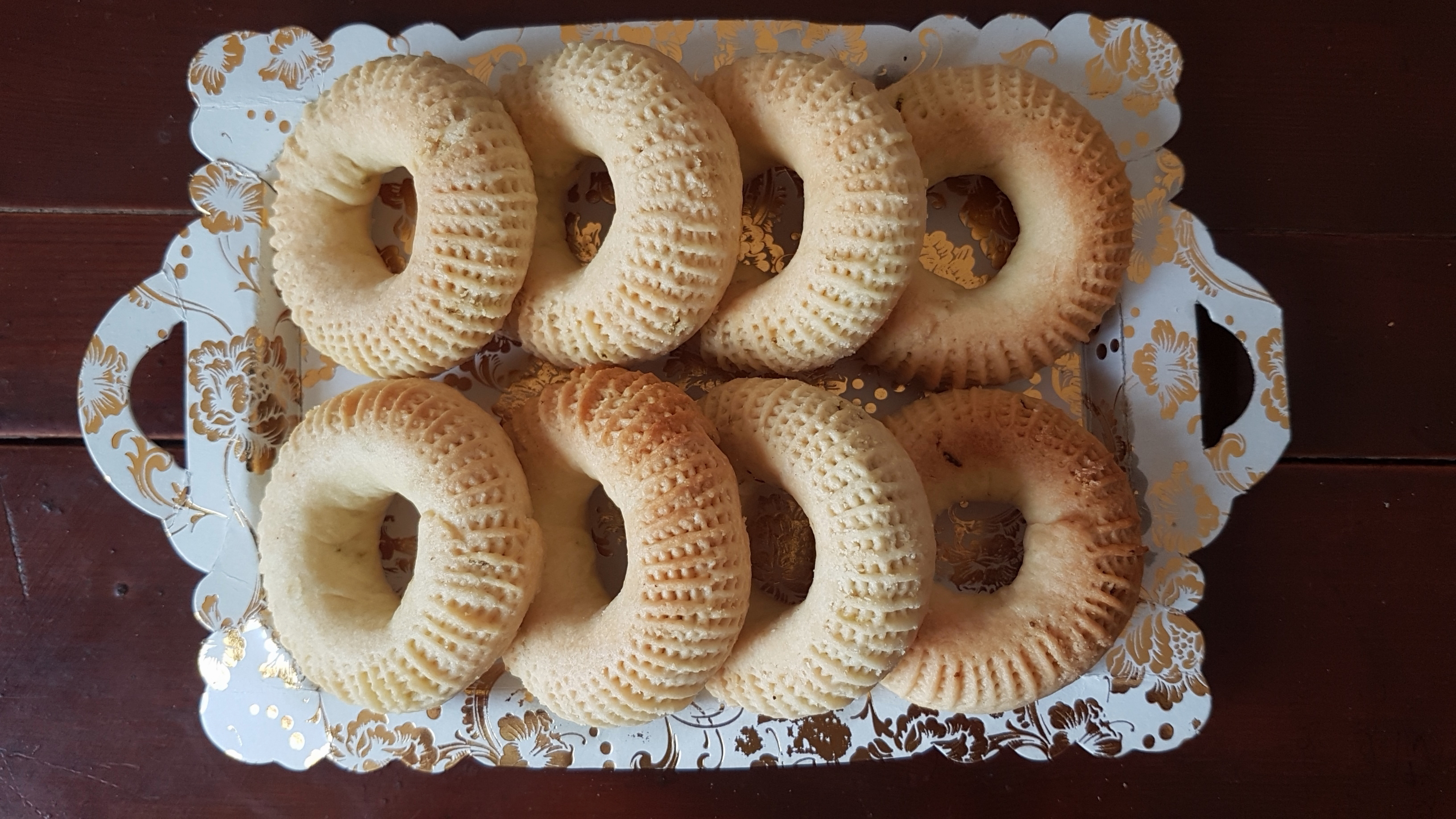
Algerian kaak nekkash

Algerians make kaak nakache (Arabic: كعك نقاش) for Eid, which are ornamented, date-filled, rose-scented, almond cookie rings.

==== Malta ====
In Maltese cuisine, Qagħaq tal-Appostli are made during Lent with almonds placed around the wreath representing the twelve apostles. Other Qagħaq are available throughout the year in Malta, including Qagħaq tal-ħmira (yeast rings), Qagħaq tal-ghasel (honey rings) and Qagħaq tal-gulglien (sesame biscuits).

==== Levant ====
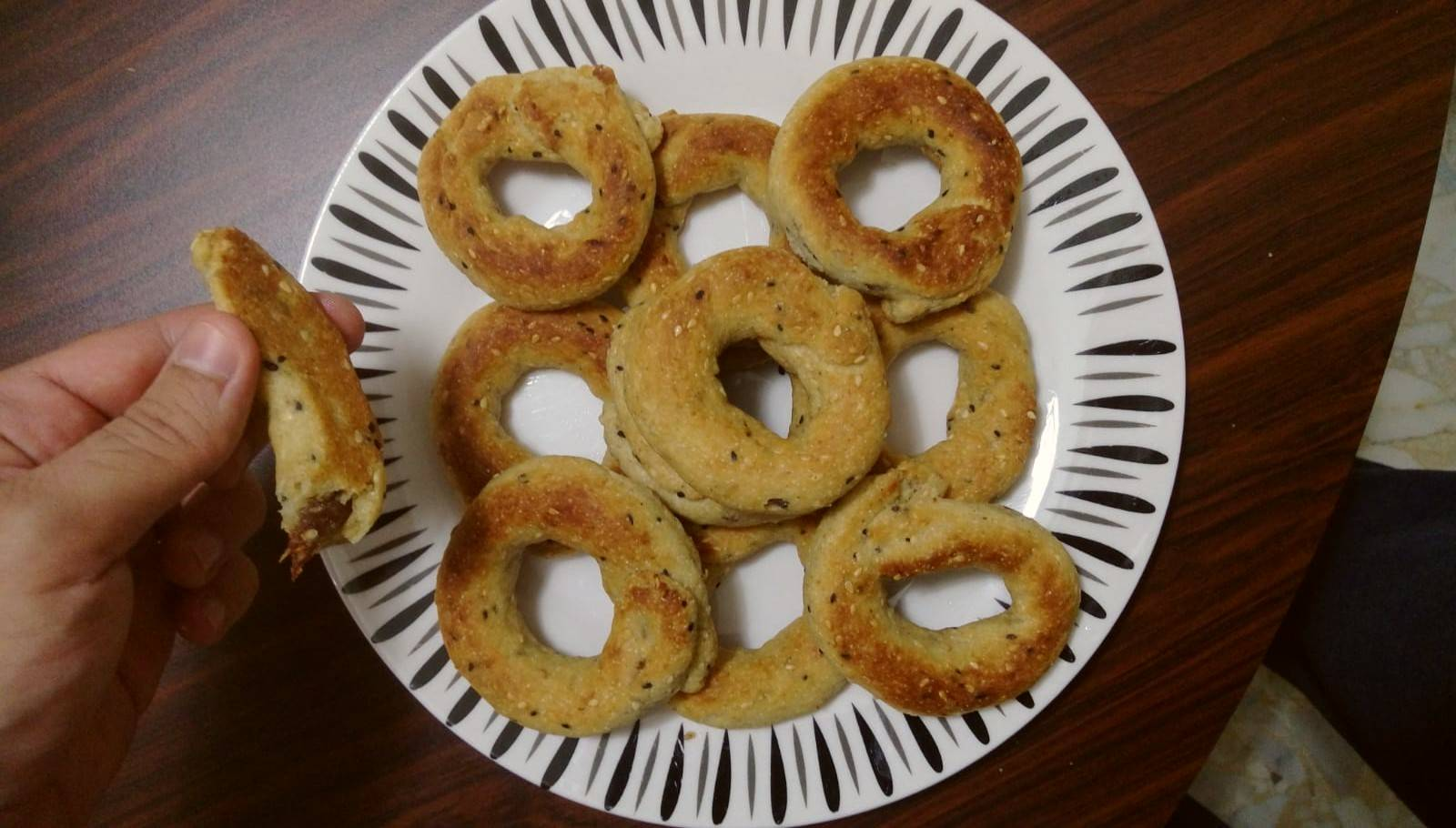
Palestinian ka'ak bi ajwa, semolina-based ka'ak filled with dates

In Gaza, when a neighbour sends a dish filled with food to your house as is often the case during the holidays, it is customary to return the dish filled with food of your own making, and most commonly with ka'ak bi ajwa. The ka'ak sweets are also made year round among the entire Palestinian population and flour is sometimes substituted for semolina.

In Idlib, Syria, olive oil flavored ka'ak are traditionally made for Eid.

Ka'ak al-asfar ("the yellow roll") is a cake of bread that is made by Muslims in the Levant to honour the souls of the departed. Traditionally, this bread, stamped with an elaborate geometric design, was distributed along with dried fruit to the poor, to children, and to relatives, by the family of the deceased on the Thursday and Monday following the death and on a day known as Khamis al-Amwat ("Thursday of the Dead"). A bread stamp (signum pistoris) that was used to imprint designs on these cakes was discovered in Palestine and dates back to the fourteenth or fifteenth century CE. It is round, with a round handle and geometric designs, and measures 19 centimeters in diameter. Ka'ak asfar is also traditionally made by Palestinian Christians on Easter.

Maqroota (Arabic: مقروطة) is a date-filled and anise-flavored variation of ka'ak, maqroota is often shaped into a 3 layer cake, with dough on the top and bottom layers and dates in the middle, which is then cut into pieces before baking, or shaped into rolls like kleicha, it typically contains olive oil or samneh. It is popular in Palestine, and in Lebanon, particularly in Sidon and among Palestinian refugees.

==== Iraq ====
Ka'ak sweets made by Iraqis are generally doughnut-shaped and covered in sesame seeds, such as ka'ak ab sumsum and ka'ak eem kishmish, which has raisins among other ingredients. Ka'ak beharat oo tefach shares the shape and many of the same ingredients as ka'ak eem tzmukin, but substitutes apples for raisins and is coated in almonds instead of sesame seeds.

==== Tunisia ====
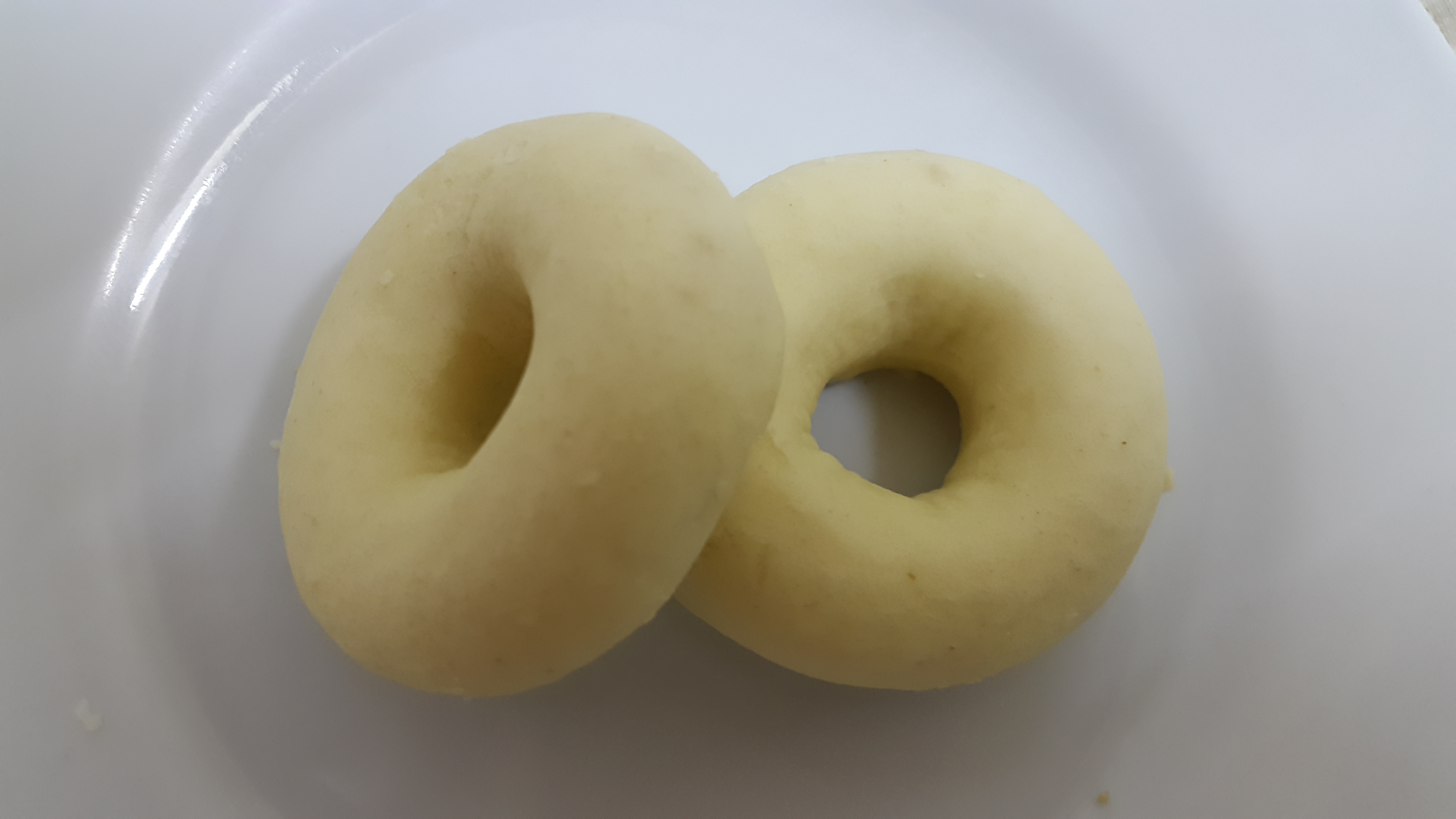
Tunisian ka'ak al-warqa, almond-filled pastry

Ka'ak warqa (Arabic: كعك ورقة) is a rose-scented almond cookie made in Zaghouan, Tunisia. Date-filled ka'ak are made for Eid al-Fitr.

==== Yemen ====
In Yemen, ka'ak was traditionally made by kneading dough with oil, battered eggs and sugar, with a sparse additive of black cumin (Nigella sativa). The dough was made thick and kneaded thoroughly, until all ingredients were mixed together. When formed into the traditional shape, they were set out on a tray until the dough rises, after which the dough was brushed with egg yolk, and baked. Clarified butter (samneh) was often brushed on top of the dough. Ka'ak was the traditional pastry eaten by the Jews of Yemen during the feast of Purim.

==== Iran ====
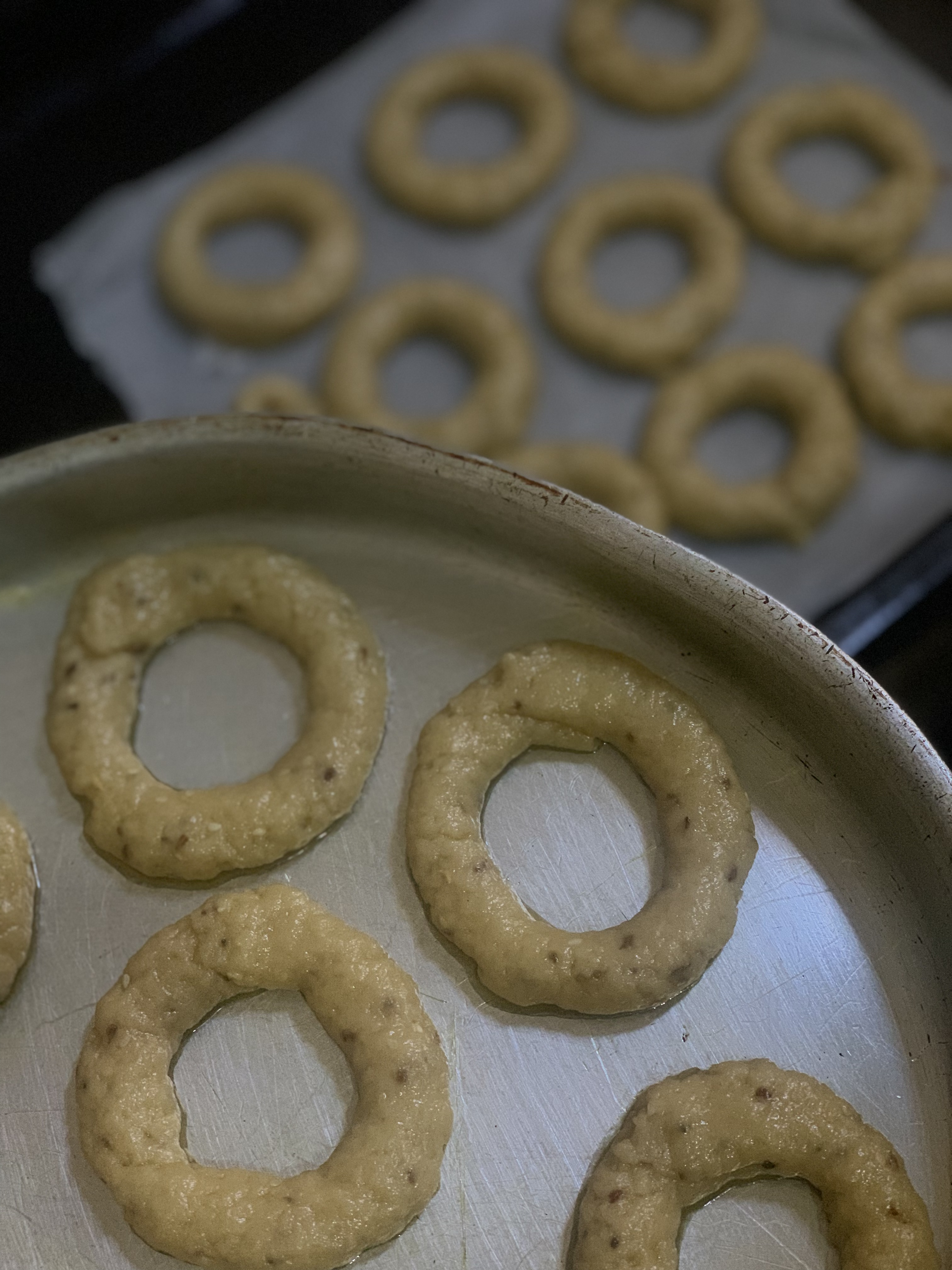
Libyan ka'ak, not yet baked

Ka'ak is also baked in the Kurdish city of Kermanshah of Iran. In 2012, during the 7th National Meeting of the Policy Council for Registration of Spiritual Heritage of Iran, Ka'ak was registered in the list of spiritual heritage of Kermanshah province.

=== Savory ===
Salty and spicy versions of ka'ak are made in Syria during Eid. Salty ka'ak is also present in Libyan cuisine, and Jerusalem where its known as "Abadi cookies".

== See also ==
- Bagel
- Bublik
- Buccellato di Lucca
- Linga (cookie)
- Rosquillo
- Simit

== Bibliography ==
- Goldman, Rivka (2006). Mama Nazima's Jewish-Iraqi Cuisine: Cuisine, History, Cultural References. Hippocrene Books. ISBN 0-7818-1144-9.
- Maxwell, Virginia; Fitzpatrick, Mary; Jenkins, Siona; Sattin, Anthony (2006). Egypt. Lonely Planet. ISBN 9781740597418.
- Qafih, Y. (1982). Halichot Teman (Jewish Life in Sanà) (in Hebrew). Jerusalem: Ben-Zvi Institute. ISBN 965-17-0137-4. OCLC 863513860.
- Rinsky, Laura Halpin (2008). The Pastry Chef's Companion: A Comprehensive Resource Guide for the Baking and Pastry Professional. John Wiley and Sons. ISBN 9780470009550.
- Winslow, Philip C. (2007). Victory for Us Is to See You Suffer: In the West Bank with the Palestinians and the Israelis. Beacon Press. ISBN 0-8070-6906-X.
