= Puf böreği =

Type of food

- Course: Main course
- Region or state: Turkey
- Created by: Ottoman cuisine
- Serving temperature: Hot
- Main ingredients: Lamb, Turkish cheese or beef
- Food energy (per serving): 283 kcal (1,180 kJ)

Puf böreği is a deep-fried turnover with a filling of ground or minced meat and onions or Turkish cheese, parsley, and dill.

== Varieties in Ottoman cuisine ==
In the first Ottoman printed cookbook, Melceü't-Tabbâhîn, there is a recipe for puf böreği.

== See also ==
- List of stuffed dishes
- Curry puff
- Empanada
- Gözleme
- Haliva, a similar Circassian pastry
- Khuushuur, a similar kind of meat pastry in Mongolian cuisine
- Lángos
- Lörtsy, a similar kind of pastry in Finnish cuisine
- Pastel (food)
- Pasty
- Peremech
- Plăcintă
- Qutab
- Sha phaley, a similar Tibetan pastry
