= Böreği =

Böreği refers to the börek family of pastries and may include:

- Su böreği, cheese and parsley filo
- Puf Böreği, deep-fried turnover with a filling of ground or minced meat and onions or Turkish cheese and parsley, dill.
- Paçanga böreği, cheese, pastirma, tomato, parsley and pepper filo
- Kol böreği, filo traditionally filled with cheese, potatoes, spinach, or meat
- Laz böreği, filo dough, butter, muhallebi, black pepper and syrup.
- Ispanaklı Selanik Böreği, Savory spinach pie
- Sigara böreği, cigarette filo: spring rolls
- Tatar böreği, dumplings covered in yogurt and filled with ground beef, garlic and parsley
- Sarıyer böreği, made with minced meat, cheese, potato or spinach.
