= Fatayer =

Arab and Levantine stuffed pie

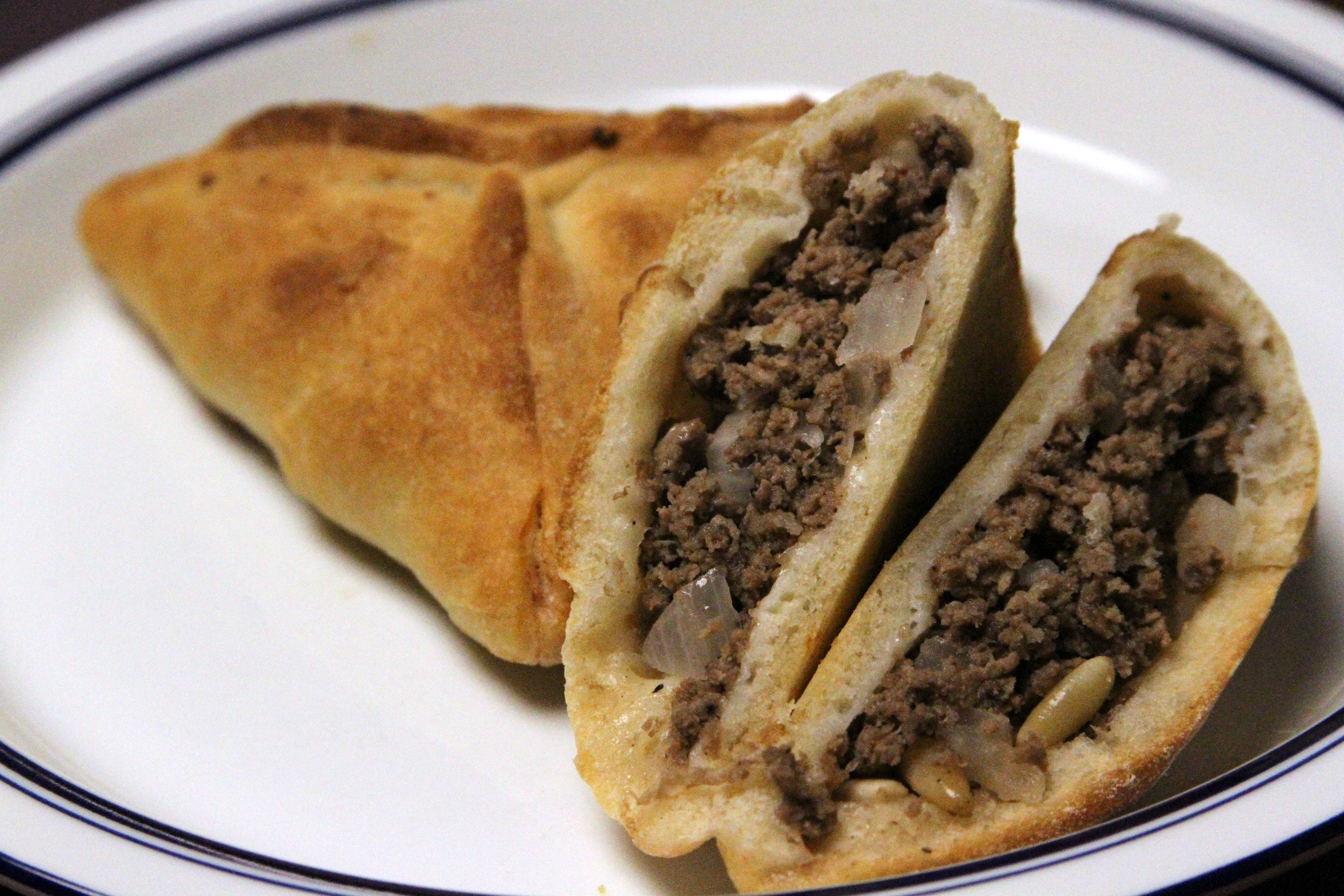
- Type: Pie
- Place of origin: Levant
- Region or state: Lebanon; Syria; Jordan; Israel; Palestine; Iraq; Egypt; Yemen
- Associated cuisine: Levantine cuisine
- Main ingredients: Meat, spinach, cheese or za'atar

Fatayer (Standard Arabic: فطائر, romanized: faṭāʾir; Levantine Arabic: فطاير, romanized: faṭāyir; sing. فطيرة, faṭīra) are filled pies, typically stuffed with spinach, meat, or cheese such as feta or akkawi. They are part of Arab and Levantine cuisine and are eaten in Lebanon, Syria, Palestine, Jordan, Iraq, Egypt, israel. Fatayer are also popular in Argentina, where they are considered a variety of empanada under the name empanadas árabes (singular form empanada árabe), and in Brazil, where they are known as esfihas fechadas ("closed sfihas", singular form esfiha fechada).

Some fatayer are commonly frozen and reheated prior to eating.

== History and etymology ==
The word fatayer is derived from the Arabic word faṭīrah (فطيرة), whose plural form is faṭayīr. The word fatayir is attested in English as early as 1882 in an Arabic-English dictionary by Francis Joseph Steingass, where its translated as "pastry", and equated with sambusaq.

The name fatayer is sometimes used interchangeably with sambusak; referring to the baked or fried Arab turnovers. Sambusak descends from the medieval samosa, which is attested as early as the 9th-century in Persia. According to food historian Nawal Nasrallah, sambusak can be considered a variety of fatayir.

Fatayer originally referred to unleavened flatbreads, but eventually came to refer to filled pastries made with said unleavened bread. Triangular filled pastries filled with cheese called mujabbanat (Arabic: مجبنات) can be found in a 13th-century augmented version of Ibn Sayyar al-Warraq's 10th century cookbook Kitab al-Tabikh. She also describes the medieval sambusak as a variety of fatayir.

An early description is found in Arbeit und Sitte in Palaestina ("Work and customs in Palestine"); a 1935 book by German Orientalist Gustaf Dalman. In the book, he describes folded unleavened breads called "faṭāir" being baked, among those described is "fatira bisbankha", made triangular or round with a spinach and onion filling, and "fatira blebene", filled with "lebene", which he likened to quark.

== Regional variations ==
=== Levant ===
Different combinations of fillings and shapes are used for fatayer. Common fillings include:

- Cheese (such as feta, akkawi or halloumi) with nigella seeds
- Spinach, commonly with sumac and onions; this variant is popular in the Levant and is known as fatayer sabanekh (Levantine Arabic: فطاير سبانخ). Other greens are common fillings as well, like fresh Origanum syriacum, in fatayer made during the winter by Palestinians.
- Minced lamb meat and nuts
- Eggs
- Kashk and meat, popular in some Syrian cities
- Labneh, popular in Lebanon

A variety of spices may also be used for each variant. The shapes also vary; some are fully enclosed triangles, while other are shaped like boats with part of the filling exposed. The dough is sometimes unleavened, and can be flavored with spices like mahleb. The different shapes may denote different fillings, for instances, triangles for spinach, and boats for cheese.

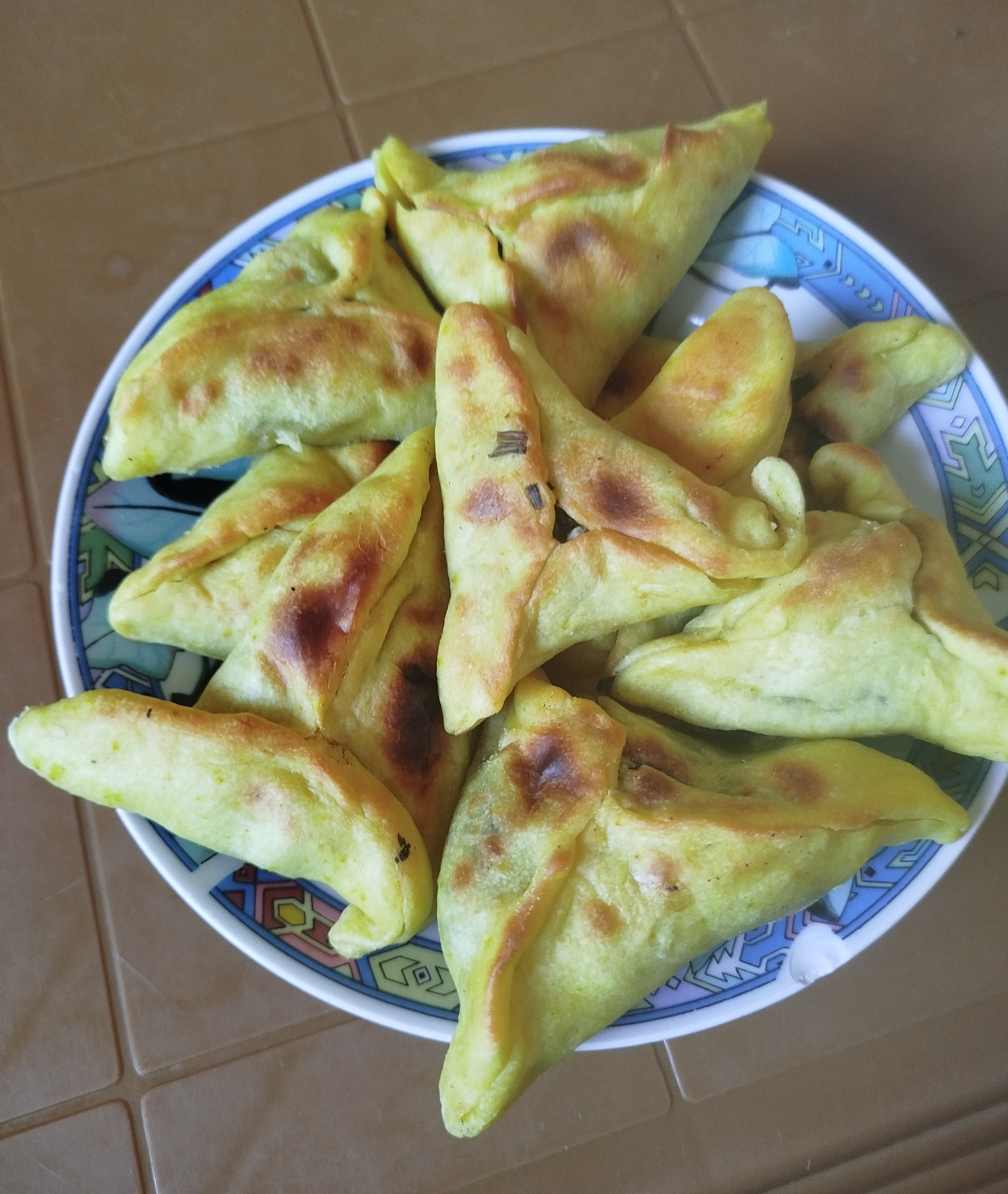
Fatayer sabanekh

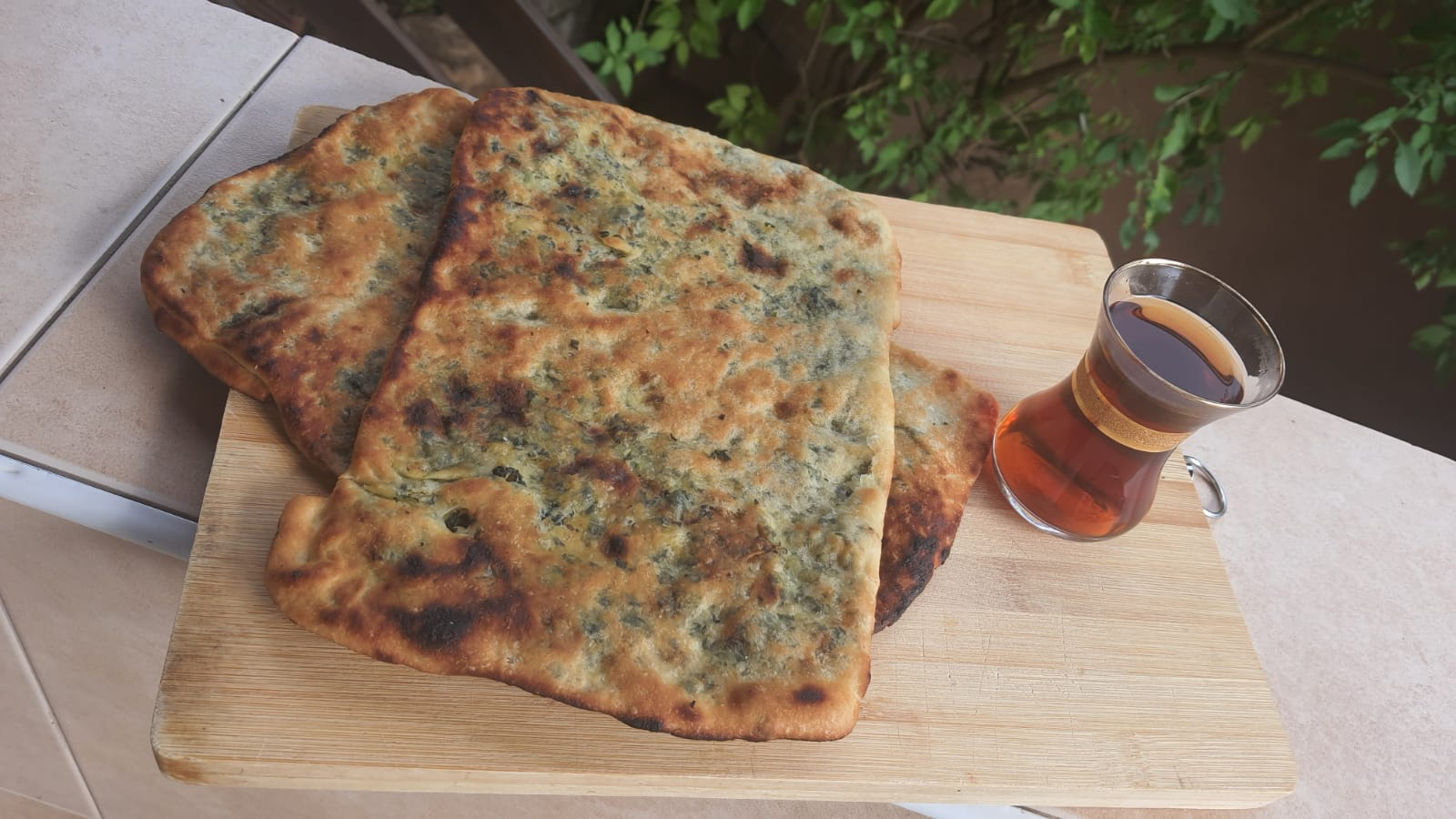
Palestinian fatayer zaatar

=== Latin America ===
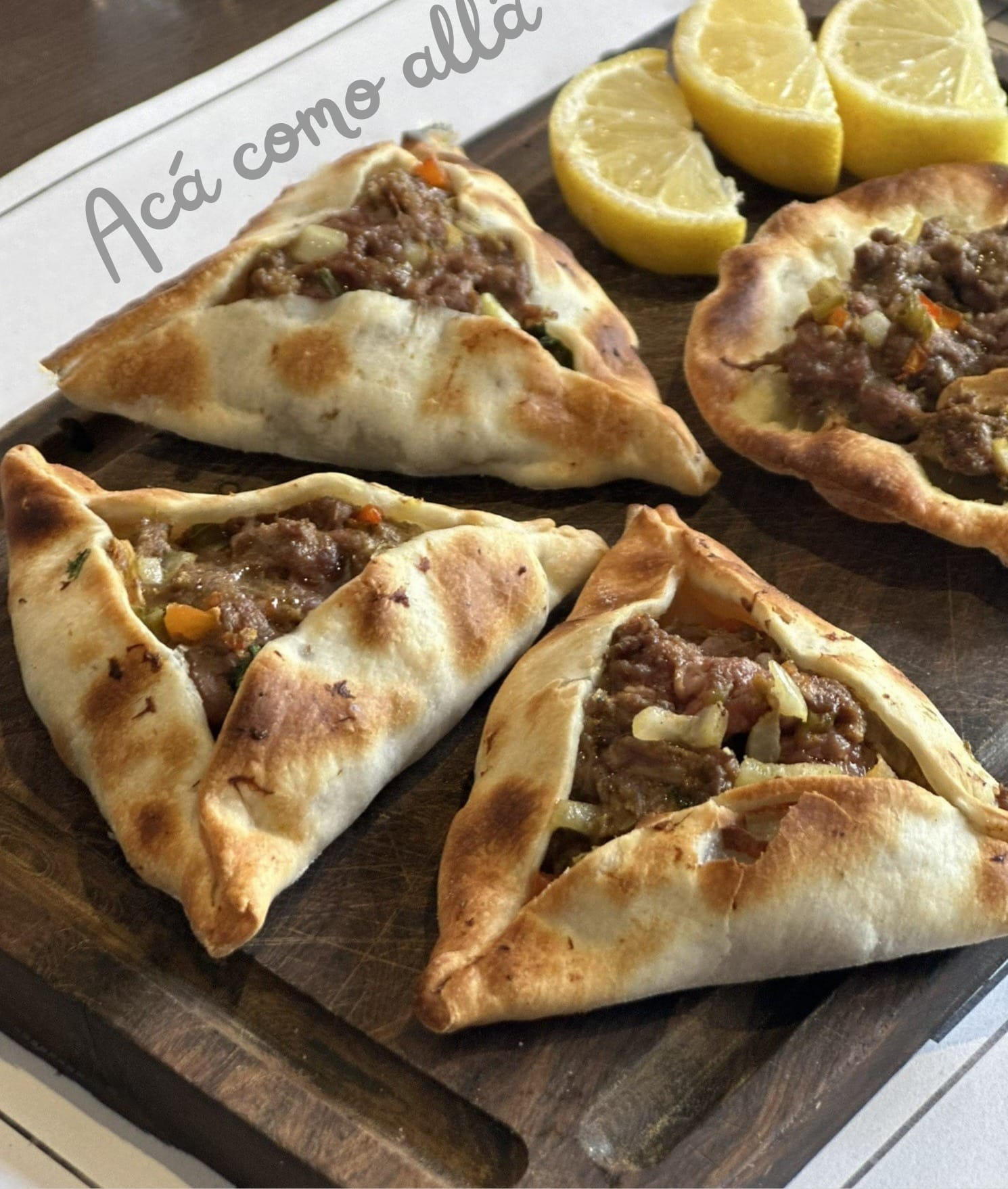
Empanadas árabes, open-faced like sfiha and served with lemons

Empanadas árabes, or fatay, are a variation of fatayer popular in some Latin American countries, such as Argentina, Chile, Bolivia, Colombia, and Venezuela.

Fatay are triangular, with a filling typically consisting of tomato, onion, and minced meat, and topped with lemon juice. They are sometimes open-faced and sometimes closed; they closely resemble sfiha.

== See also ==
- Curry puff
- Samosa
- Lahmacun
- Uchpuchmak
- Börek
- Chebureki
- Bougatsa
- Pogača
- Banitsa
- Khachapuri
- Knish
- Cantiq
- Pierogi
- Pirozhki
- Spanakopita
- Hamantash
- Samsa
- Pasty
