= Coffee tradition of Crimean Tatars =

Coffee tradition of Crimean Tatars is a set of traditions of preparing and consuming coffee in the traditional cuisine of the Crimean Tatars. The drink made from coffee beans came to Crimea from Turkey in the 16th century. Since then, coffee has occupied a special place in the life of the Crimean Tatars: it was drunk with guests, during discussions of important matters and business deals, every day in the family circle and during holidays.

== Preparation ==
First, the roasted coffee beans are ground very finely. This is done using a special hand grinder called a degirman. There are two ways to brew coffee: home (in a cezve coffee maker) and outdoor (in a special vessel called a kave-kuman).

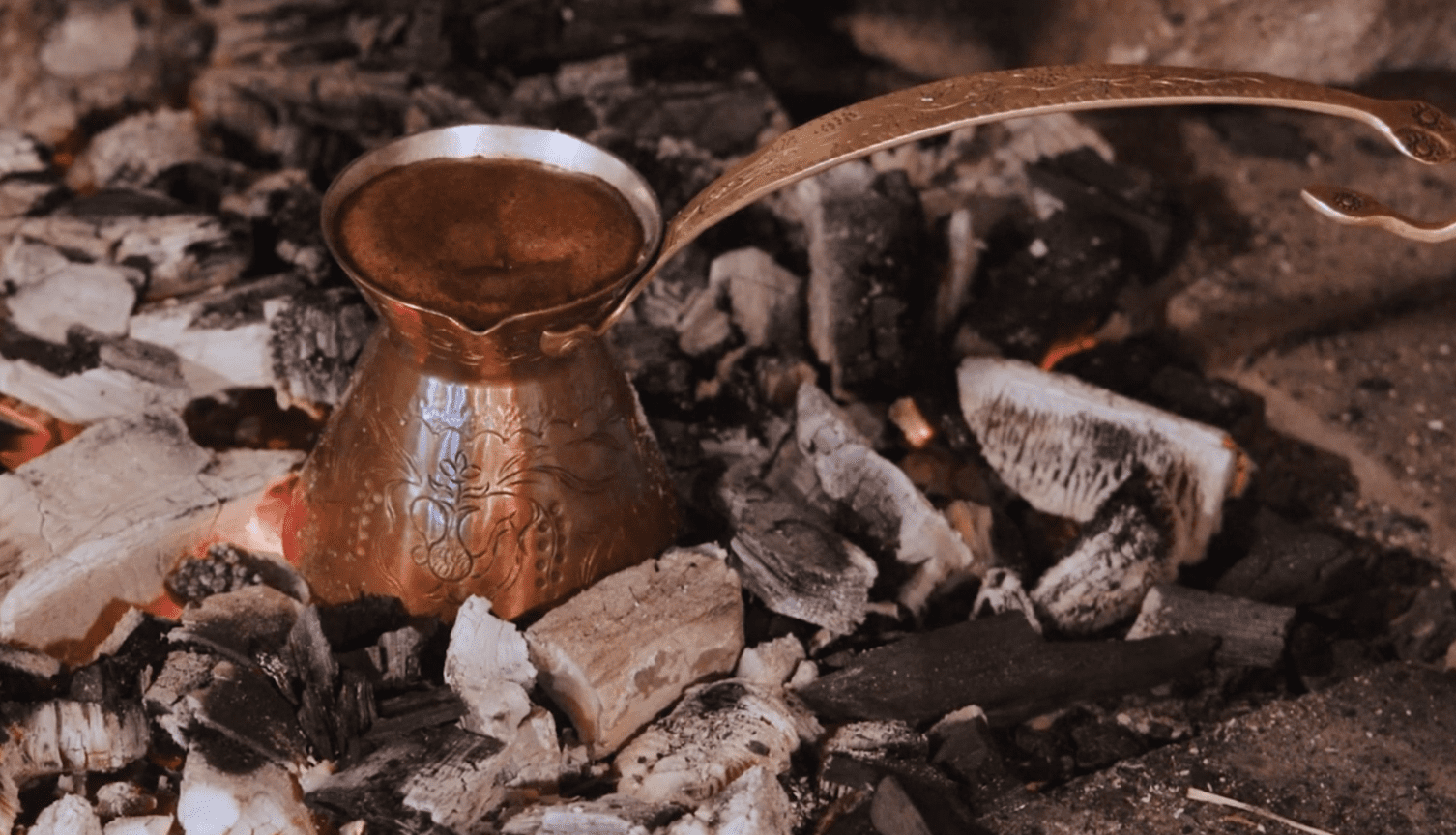
Cezve with coffee

Crimean Tatars once distinguished between men's and women's (children's) coffee.

Men's coffee was prepared as follows: a crumb of rock salt and sugar was placed in a cold cezve, then coffee powder was poured in, cold water was poured in, and placed in hot sand, waiting for it to boil. A pea of mutton fat was placed in a heated filzhan cup, a little coffee that had just boiled was poured in, and then cream was added.

The recipe for women's coffee was as follows: before brewing, a small piece of crushed sugar was placed in a cold cezve, coffee powder was poured on it, boiling water was poured over it, and the cezve thus seasoned was immediately placed in the heat of the sand. As soon as the coffee boiled to the first froth, it was quickly poured into preheated fildzhany cups.

In the 20th century, coffee began to be prepared with various additional ingredients:

- fragrant coffee brewed with milk ("syutlyu kave");
- strong black coffee with cinnamon ("tarchin kavesi");
- strong coffee with cinnamon and cloves ("karonfil kavesi").

== Serving ==
Coffee is served poured into cups called filidjan. For ease of use, so as not to burn your fingers, the filidjan is placed on a stand called zadar. In addition to the cups, a traditional coffee pot called yibrik and plates with sweets are placed on the table. As a sweet, crushed sugar is often served, which is simply eaten, rather than dissolved in coffee, or shortbread cookies called khurabje (khurabye), which are made from flour, sugar, and fried butter.

Coffee was also served with halva, various jams: roses in sugar, unripe walnuts, white lilies, and nut cookies - baklava. Men often preferred tobacco over sweets, enjoying coffee while smoking a chubuk or hookah.

== Occasions for consumption ==
Rituals associated with coffee consumption vary depending on occasion:

- Khoshkelʹdi kavesi (trans. "greeting coffee"): Coffee that is offered when guests are visiting in order to brighten the mood and create a warm atmosphere. Preparation of this coffee is accompanied by conversation and the rhythmic sounds of grinding coffee beans. Conversation is slow and deliberate. Polite hosts ensure that the guests get to speak about what is important to them — relatives' health, home-related news, and children's successes. As the ritual unfolds, freshly brewed coffee and sweets appear on the table.
- Saba kavesi: Morning coffee with family. It allows family members to gather around a table and create a comfortable atmosphere in which they can coordinate plans, share ideas, and focus on important tasks as they start their days. Saba kavesi provides an opportunity to show respect and support for one another, as well as discuss the health and well-being of elders.
- Bayram kavesi (trans. "quick coffee"): Bayram kavesi is the tradition of drinking coffee during visits to relatives on the religious holidays of Eid al-Adha and Eid al-Fitr. On these holidays, young people visit their elders to greet them and wish them good health; these visits are accompanied by coffee and sweets. Bayram kavesi is referred to as "quick coffee" because up to 30 such "quick coffee" visits with relatives are required per day.
- Kelin kavesi (trans. "bride's coffee"): Kelin kavesi is coffee brewed by the bride when receiving guests at her husband's house after their wedding. Per tradition, the bride's family visits the newlyweds and treats them to coffee and sweets. The bride's parents are not involved in this visit, making it less formal. This allows for a break from wedding chaos during which relatives can grow closer and establish new relationships.
- Kozaydyn kavesi (trans. "coffee for good news"): Kozaydyn kavesi is served to loved ones upon delivering good news or sharing of family successes — for example, the birth of a child, an important purchase, finishing education, and so on. This coffee is an opportunity to thank others for their support, share joy with loved ones, and foster intracommunity solidarity.

== Crimean Tatar coffee today ==
Today, Crimean Tatar coffee can be tasted in coffee shops in Kyiv, Lviv, and Odesa. Crimean Tatar coffee was included in the National List of Elements of the Intangible Cultural Heritage of Ukraine. Ukraine celebrated 15 years of accession to the UNESCO Convention for the Safeguarding of the Intangible Cultural Heritage.

== See also ==
- Crimean Tatar cuisine
- Crimean Tatar culture
