= Sarburma =

Crimean Tatar meat pie

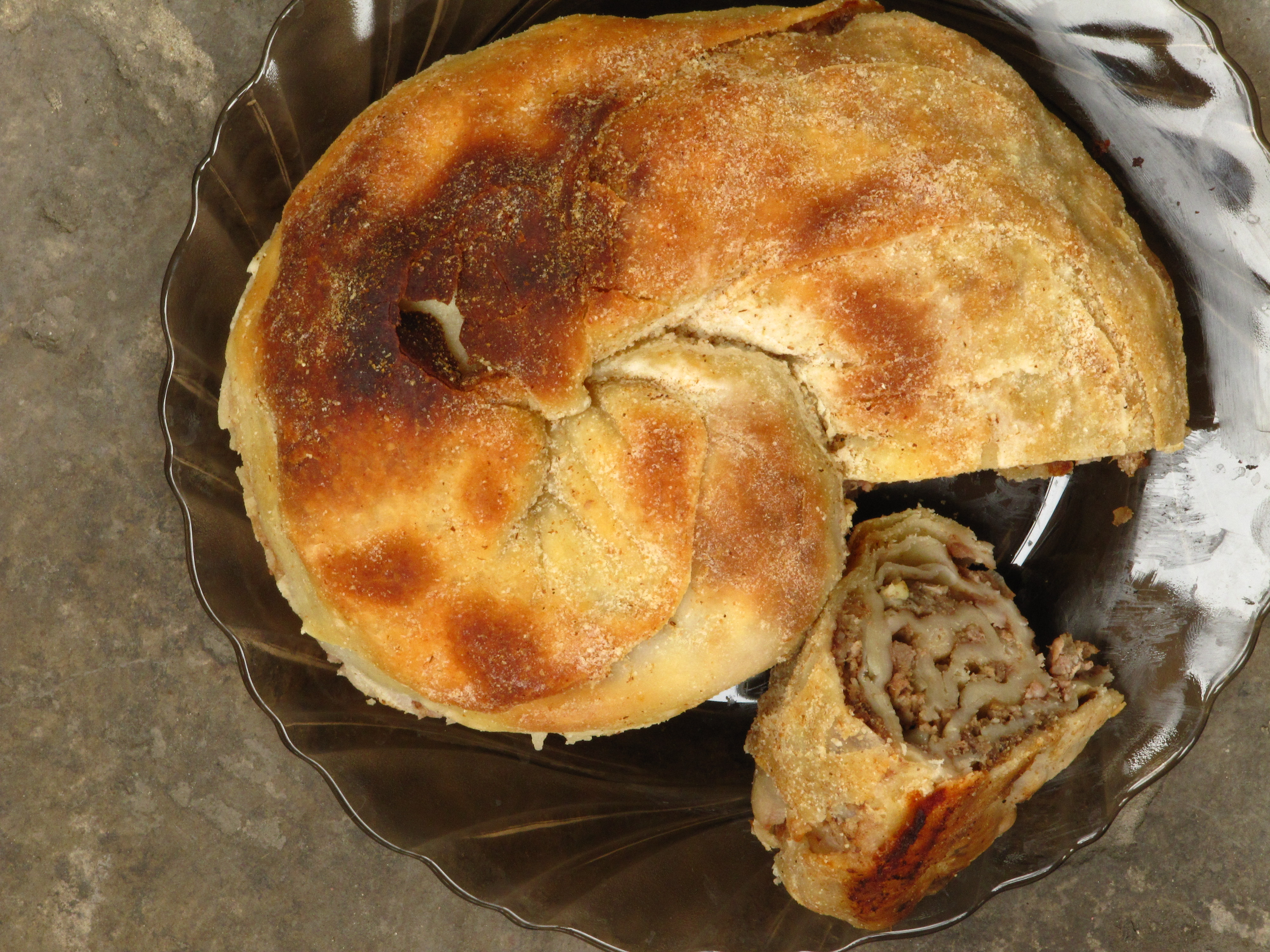
- Course: Main course
- Place of origin: Crimea
- Serving temperature: Hot
- Main ingredients: Lamb and dough

Sarburma, also known simply as burma among Crimean Tatars and as pierekaczewnik among Lipka Tatars, is a traditional meat pie in Crimean Tatar cuisine. In Crimean Tatar language sarmaq means "to wrap" and burmaq "to curl". Its name among Lipka Tatars comes from the Russian verb перека́тывать "to roll up." Nowadays, it is a widespread snack in Crimea, neighbouring regions of Ukraine (Ukrainian: сарбурма), and in Turkey (Turkish: etli kol böreği). In Poland it is a distinctive cuisine of the Lipka Tatars, and is registered under the name pierekaczewnik in the European Union and United Kingdom as a Traditional Speciality Guaranteed. The main ingredients are traditionally lamb and dough. The same are used in another popular Crimean and Turkish dish, çibereks.

== See also ==
- Börek
