= Pastel (food) =

Spanish and Portuguese word for pastry

Pastel is the Spanish and Portuguese word for pastry, a sugary food, and is the name given to different typical dishes of various countries where those languages are spoken or have historically influenced. In Mexico, pastel typically means cake, as with pastel de tres leches. However, in different Latin American countries pastel can refer to very different sugary dishes, and even to non-sugary ones as well. In some places, like Brazil, the word can refer to both a sugary and non-sugary food, depending on the filling used.

== Brazil ==
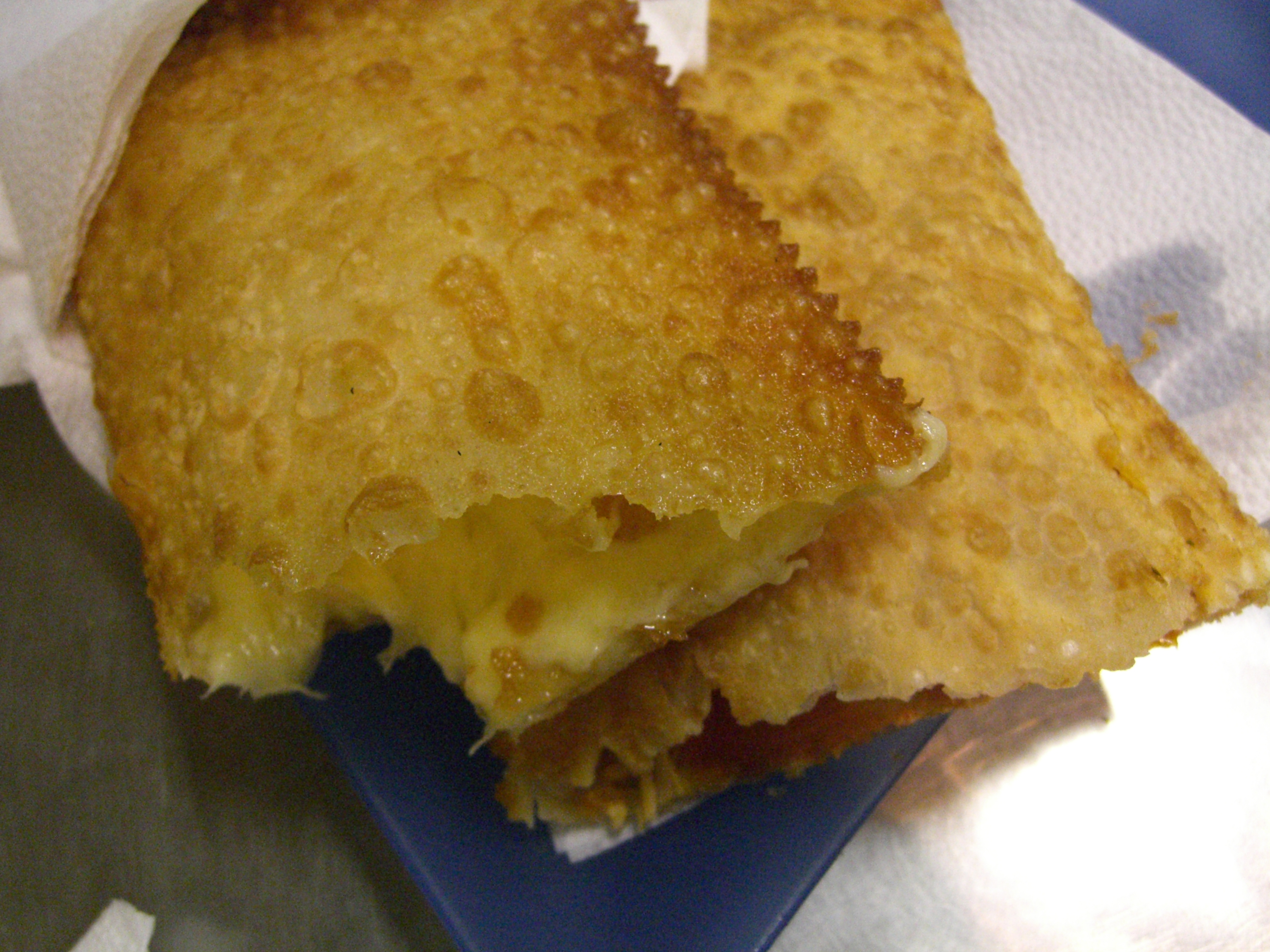
A Brazilian cheese pastel made in São Paulo

In Brazil, pastel (plural: pastéis) is a typical street-food Brazilian dish consisting of half-circle or rectangle-shaped thin-crust pies, with assorted savory or sweet fillings, that are fried in vegetable oil. The result is a crispy, brownish-fried pie. An example of sweet filling is guava paste with Minas cheese. Banana and chocolate also exist. The pastel is classified in Brazilian cuisine as a salgado (savoury snack). It is traditionally sold on the streets, in open-air marketplaces, or in shops known as pastelarias. Popular folklore states that Brazilian pastels originated when Japanese immigrants adapted Chinese fried spring rolls to sell as snacks at weekly street markets. A common beverage to drink with pastéis is caldo de cana, sugarcane juice. Pastéis can also consist of non-sweet fillings, such as ground meat, mozzarella, Catupiry, heart of palm, codfish, cream cheese, chicken, and small shrimp.

== Mexico ==
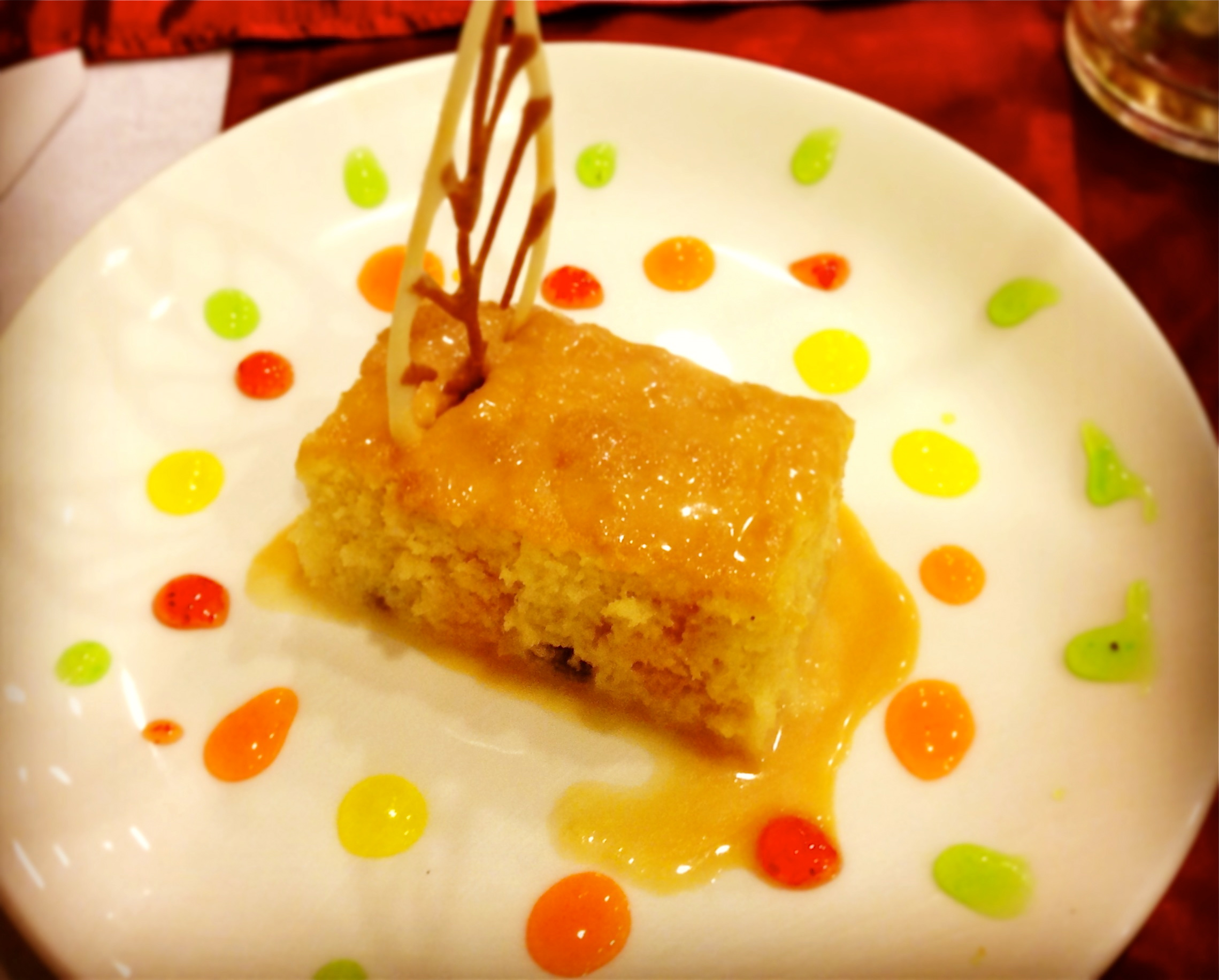
A decorated slice of pastel de tres leches

In Mexico, pastel typically means "cake", as in the dessert called pastel de tres leches. Pastel de tres leches is also served in other Latin American countries, such as Nicaragua, Panama, Cuba, Puerto Rico, Guatemala, and Costa Rica, but the word used to describe it may not be "pastel". In Puerto Rico, for example, the same food as the one in Mexico is called bizcocho de tres leches.

== Portugal ==
A pastel in Portugal may refer to several types of desserts or hors d'œuvres. These include the pastel de bacalhau and the pastel de nata.

== Greece and Cyprus ==
A dish under a similar name in Greek ("παστέλι") is a sesame seed candy type of dish.

== Non-sugary foods ==
The word "pastel" (or its plural "pasteles") is used in some Spanish-speaking countries to refer to a starchy, non-sugary food.

=== Brazil ===
In Brazil, the pastel is also made in a non-sugary variety, as it can also be made with sweet fillings, such as guava paste with Minas cheese, or banana and chocolate. It is traditionally sold on the streets, in open-air marketplaces, or in fast-food shops known as pastelarias. A common beverage to drink with pastéis is caldo de cana, a sugarcane juice.

=== Indonesia ===
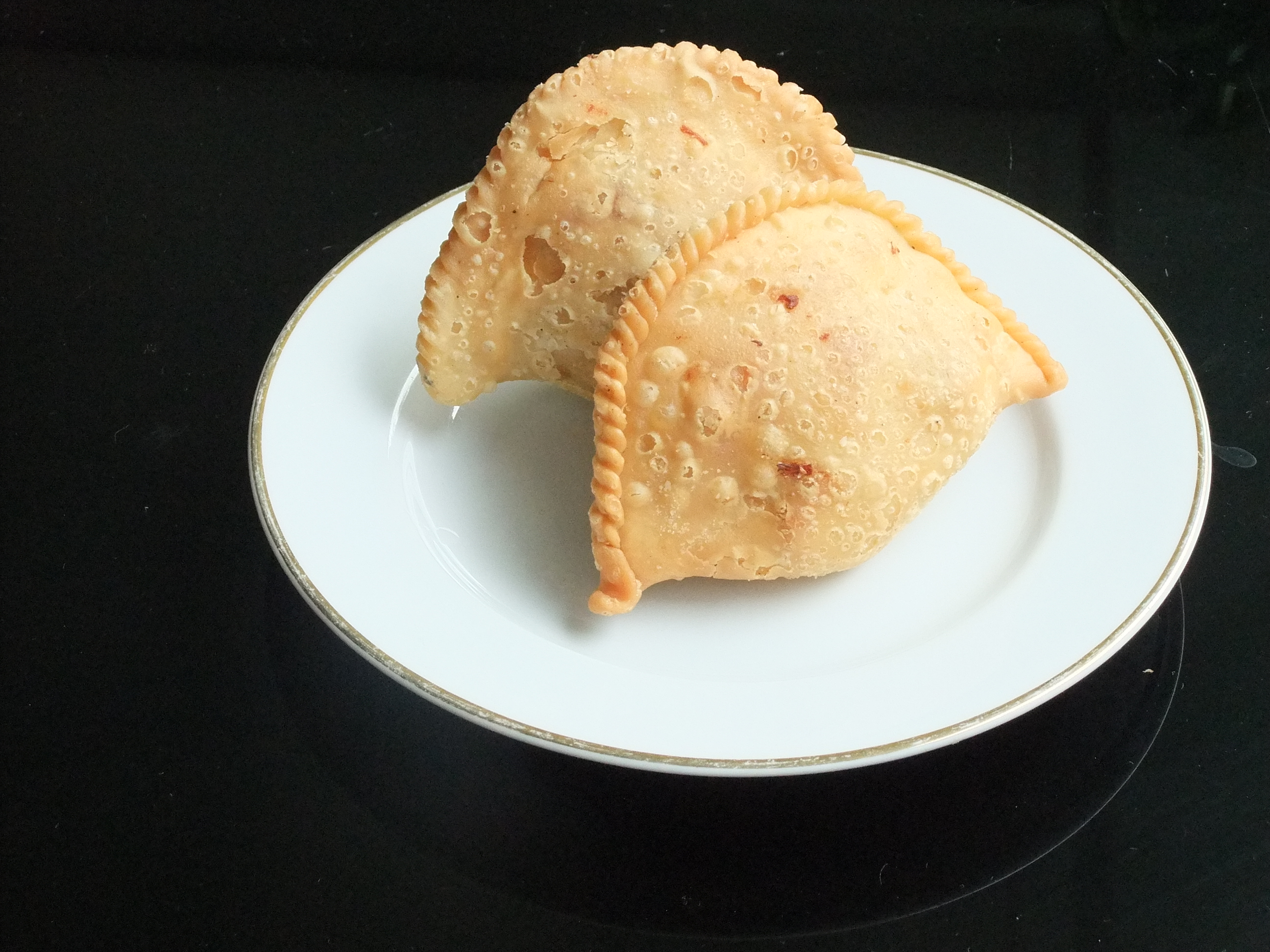
Indonesian pastel

In Indonesia, pastel refers to a pie crust made of thin pastry filled with meat (usually chicken) mixed with vegetables (peas, chopped carrots, and diced potatoes), rice vermicelli, and sometimes slices of egg, then deep-fried in vegetable oil. It is similar to an empanada. It is consumed as a snack and commonly sold in Indonesian traditional markets. The similar Manadonese version in which thin flour pie crust is replaced with bread and filled with spicy cakalang (skipjack tuna) is called panada.

=== Philippines ===
In the Philippines, pastel may refer to any (usually chicken or meat) casserole dish baked in a pie crust. Among Muslim Filipinos, pastel is an alternative spelling of pastil, which refer to two different dishes. Pastil (also spelled patil, patel, or patir) among the Danao-speaking peoples refers to white rice and meat wrapped in a banana leaf; while pastil among the Tausug people refers to a nativized version of the empanada. In the province of Camiguin, however, it refers specifically to pastel de Camiguín, a soft, sweet-filled bun.

=== Puerto Rico ===
In Puerto Rico, where the word is generally used in its plural form (pasteles), it is a dish that includes diced pork (or chicken) with olives, raisins, chickpeas, and sweet bell peppers. This mixture is centered in dough made mainly of green bananas with a small portion of green plantain, roots ("yautía"), pumpkin, coconut milk, and potato. The dough is tinted with annatto oil. (Cassava or yucca "pasteles" dough only has yucca, coconut milk, and annatto oil in the mix.) Each "pastel" is wrapped in plantain leaf, tied in pairs with a string (the pair is called a "yunta"), boiled, and then unwrapped and served, typically with yellow rice with pigeon peas. The overall effect is very similar to Mexican and Peruvian tamales, but with a very different flavor since this dough is not corn-based. This is not a pastry by any means.

== See also ==
- Börek
- Calzone
- Chiburekki
- Circassians § Traditional cuisine
- Empanada
- Gözleme
- Haliva
- Hot Pocket
- Kalitsounia
- Khuushuur
- Kue pastel
- Lángos
- Lörtsy
- Momo
- Pasty
- Plăcintă
- Puff pastry
- Puri
- Qutab
- Samosa
- Simbusak
- Turnover
