= Crimean Tatar culture =

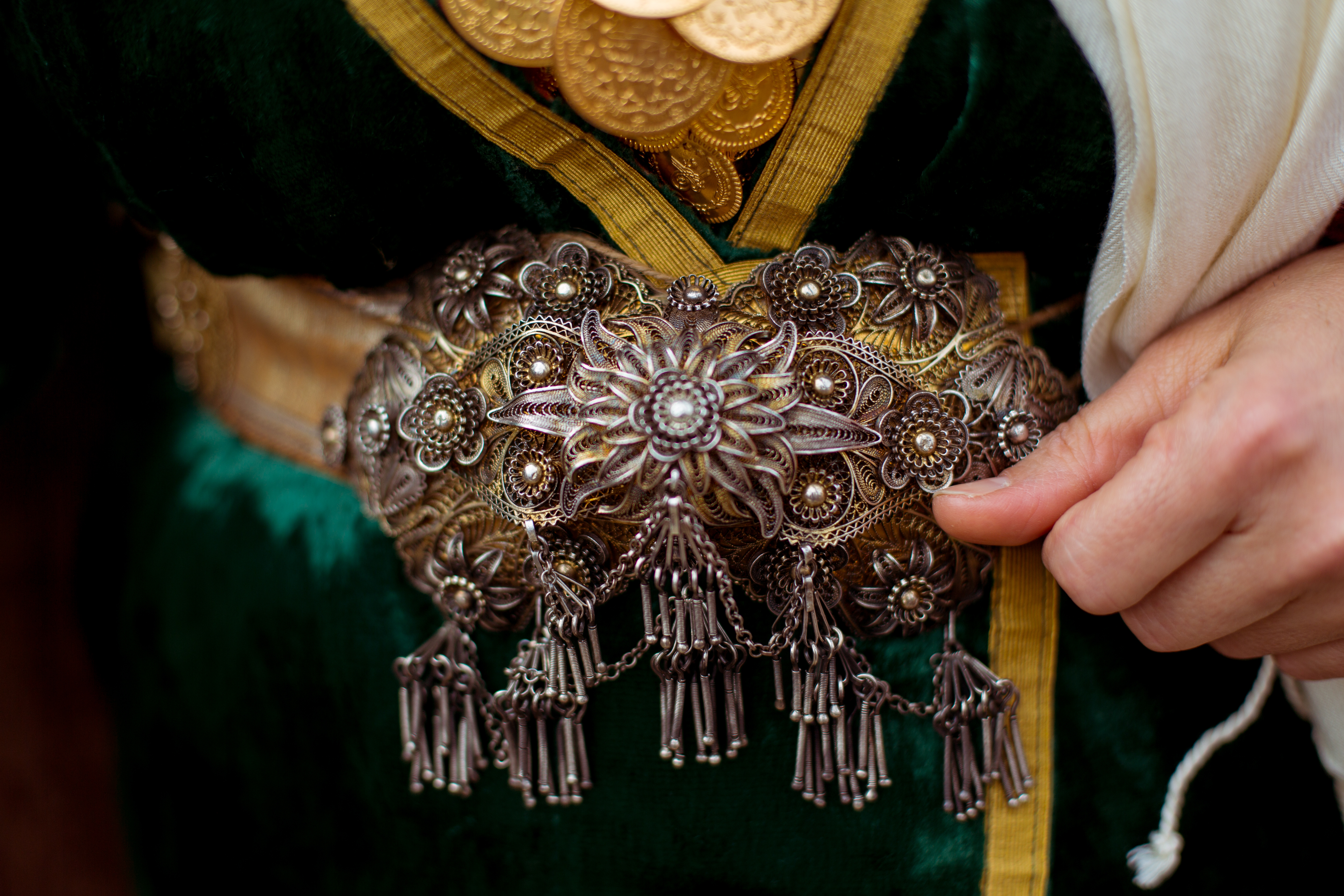
Quşaq, a traditional Crimean Tatar silver belt

Crimean Tatar culture is the culture of the indigenous people of Ukraine of Turkic origin, which was formed on the Crimean peninsula. As a people, the Crimean Tatars were formed during the period of the Crimean Khanate—a state that existed on the peninsula from 1441 to 1783. They consider themselves descendants of various peoples who lived in Crimea in different historical eras.

== Religion ==
Crimean Tatars practice Islam, so most of the holidays they celebrate come from the Muslim world.

== Language ==
The native language of the Crimean Tatars is the Crimean Tatar language. UNESCO currently lists it as an endangered language.

== Ukrainian and Crimean Tatar cultures ==
Living on the same territory, our peoples shared each other's daily life and cultural traditions as good neighbors. However, the Soviet repressive machine, after the deportation of the Crimean Tatars on May 18, 1944, did everything to erase the historical truth about them and to eliminate the connection between mainland Ukraine and the Crimean peninsula.

In fact, the history of the Crimean Khanate and the Ukrainian lands, in particular the Zaporozhian Sich, are closely linked by a common past. This is not only economics and politics, but also culture. The Crimean Tatars and Ukrainians had similar economic structures, broad self-government, and complete religious freedom. It should also not be forgotten that the same peoples and tribes participated in the ethnogenesis of the Ukrainians and the Crimean Tatars.

== Architecture ==
When it comes to the cultural heritage of the Crimean Tatars, in particular the architectural one, the Khan's Palace in Bakhchysarai is usually mentioned. But there is another pearl — the Juma-Jami Mosque, located in Yevpatoria. This mosque was one of the main ones in the Crimean Khanate. Today it is considered a masterpiece of world Islamic architecture of the 16th century.

== Unisex ==
During the time of the Crimean Khanate, Tatar men and women wore the same clothes. Over the shirt they wore a caftan with narrow sleeves, which was fastened to the neck. Underwear was limited to wide harem pants. On their feet they wore yellow socks and shoes. In summer, they wore green zhupany outdoors, and in winter—fur coats.

Men shaved their heads, over which they wore red cloth skullcaps, and over them a tall round or square hat with a narrow sheepskin brim.

Women braided their hair in two braids that curled around their heads; girls braided many small braids that hung down their backs. When women or girls left the yard, they hid their faces behind their kiseys.

== Cultural dimension ==
Many projects have been created to preserve and popularize the culture of the Crimean Tatars, including, for example, "Stories of Crimea", a multimedia immersive installation that immerses the visitor in the history and culture of Crimea.

Also, the project "Symbols of Crimea" in which, in fact, the symbols of Crimea are revealed through the memories of ten heroes who were born on the peninsula, have roots there, or have lived there long enough to call it home. Each of them tells about a symbolic object that is inextricably linked to life in Crimea for them personally.

Cultural Treasures of Crimea—an interactive video wall opens the door to the cultural treasures of the peninsula that are currently inaccessible due to the temporary occupation of Crimea by the Russian Federation.

== See also ==
- Crimean Tatar cuisine
- Coffee tradition of Crimean Tatars
