= Lepsi (dish) =

Dish from Circassian cuisine

- Place of origin: Circassia
- Region or state: Russia: Adygea; Kabardino-Balkaria; Karachay-Cherkessia; Turkey: Düzce province; Eskişehir province; Çanakkale province; Kayseri province; and more...
- Serving temperature: Hot

Lepsi (Adyghe: Лэпсы; Turkish: Lepsi) is a dish from Circassian cuisine, eaten mainly in the Düzce area by both Circassian and Turkish people. The ingredients are beef, onion, red pepper, rice, salt, and water.
