= Mataz =

Circassian dumplings originating from the North Caucasus

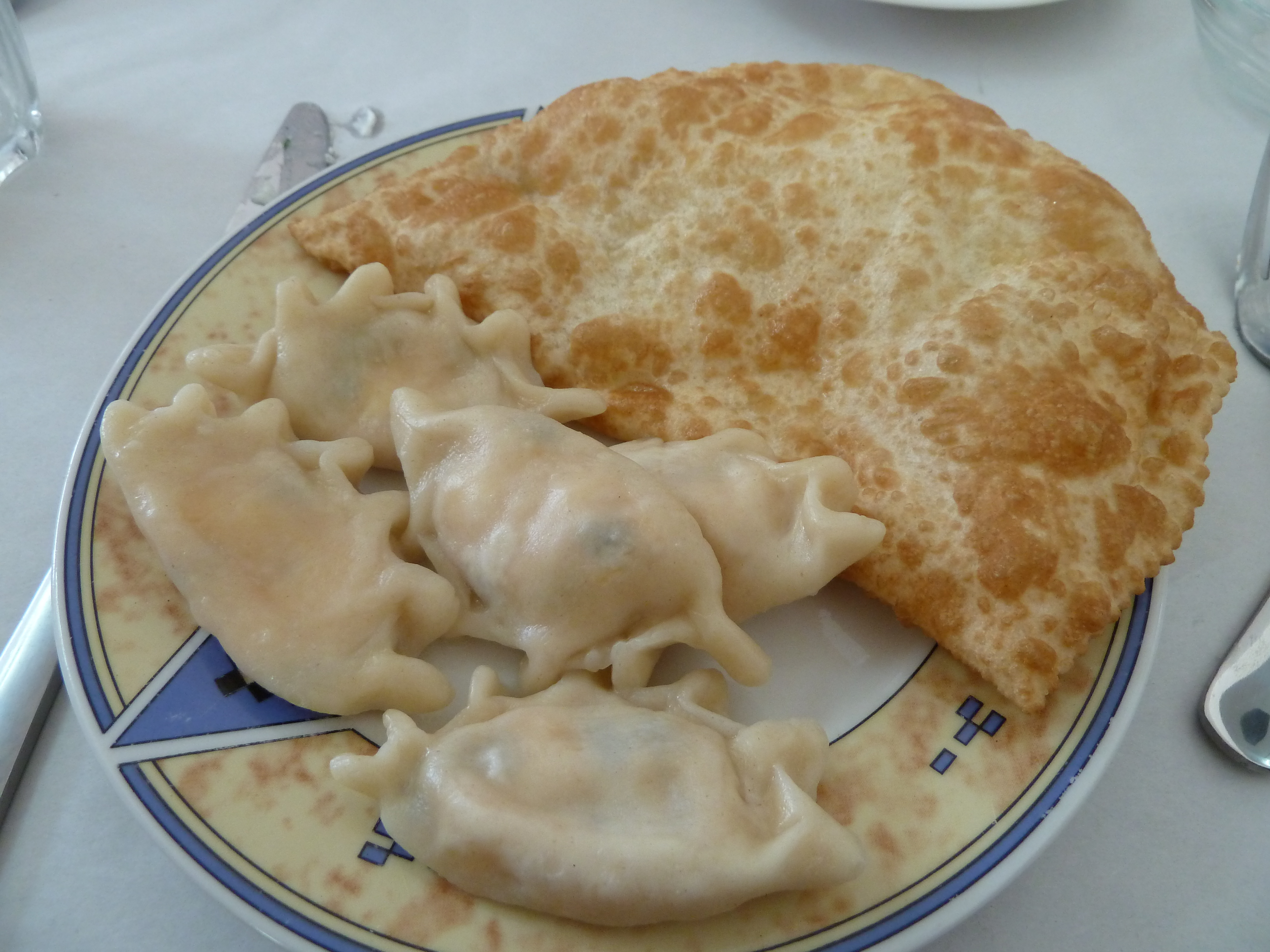
- mataz and haliva
- Alternative names: Psyhaluje, haluš, or Circassian ravioli
- Type: Dumpling
- Main ingredients: Dough: flour, eggs, water. Filling: Mashed potatoes, spiced meat (lamb or ground beef), mushrooms, cheese, greens, sauerkraut, onions, garlic.

Mataz (Circassian: мэтазэ), often called psyhaluje (Circassian: псыхьалыжъо) or haluš, are filled dumplings in Circassian cuisine. They are made by wrapping pockets of unleavened dough around a filling and cooking them in boiling water.

The dough, which is made by mixing flour and warm water, sometimes with an egg, is rolled flat and then cut into squares with a knife or circles using a cup or drinking glass. It may be stuffed with mashed potatoes and fried onions, and can be seasoned with chili pepper. Typically, these dumplings also consist (singularly or in combinations) of a spiced meat mixture, usually lamb or ground beef, with greens, sauerkraut, and onions, put in a dough wrapper, either boiled or steamed. Mushrooms or cheese may be used in place of meat.

Closely related to halušky and pierogi (varenyky), psyhaluje may be served with a topping, such as melted butter, fried onion, or combinations of these ingredients. Sour cream and yoghurt are non-traditional options.
