= Sarıyer böreği =

Type of börek

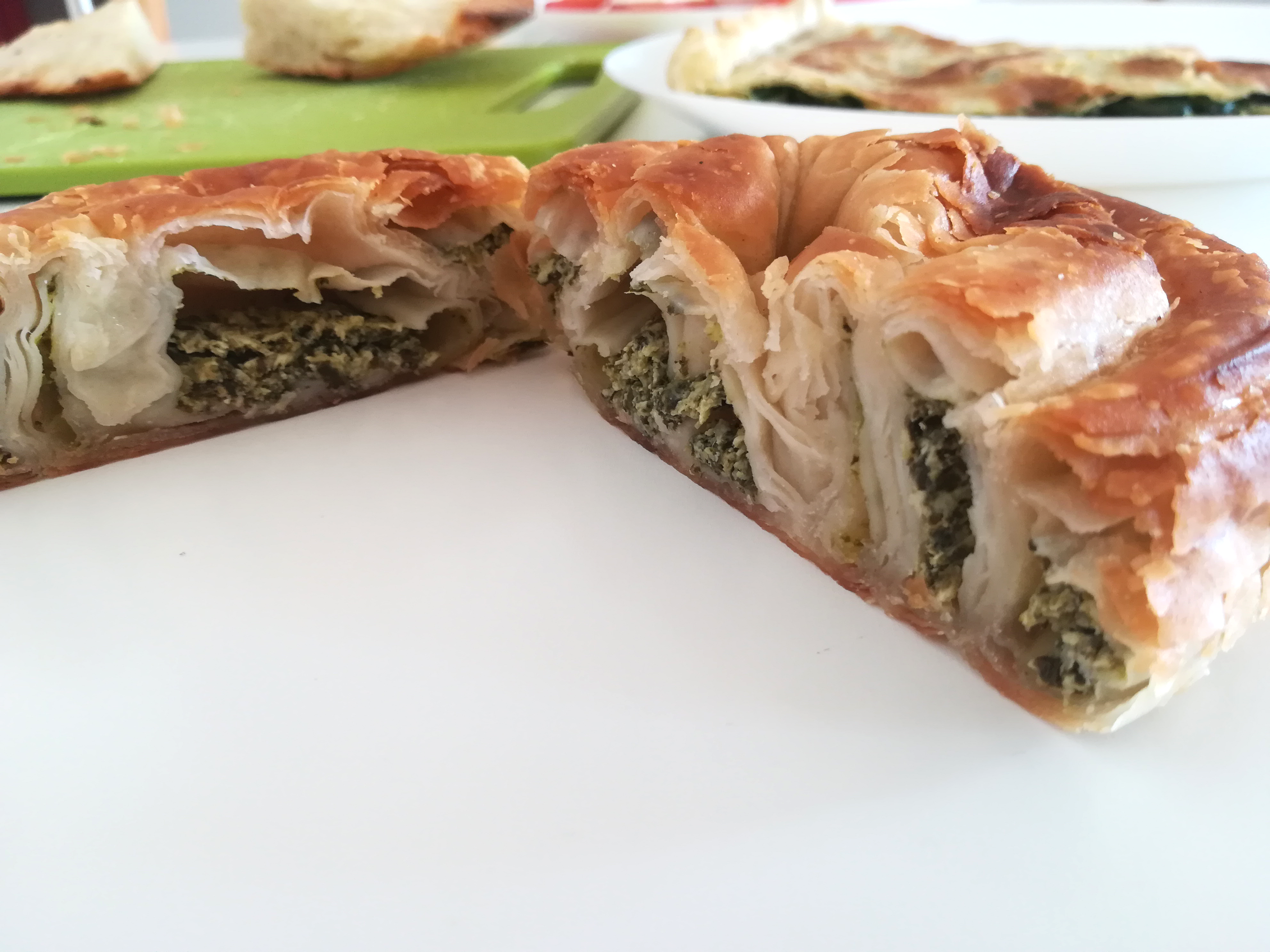
- Sarıyer böreği
- Alternative names: Karaköy böreği
- Place of origin: Sarıyer, Istanbul
- Region or state: Turkey
- Serving temperature: Hot
- Main ingredients: Cheddar cheese, minced meat and yufka

Sarıyer böreği, also known as Karaköy böreği, is a type of börek sold most commonly in pastry shops across Turkey. It is said to have been first made at the end of the 19th century in Sarıyer, Istanbul. It resembles the kol böreği in terms of appearance. It can be made with minced meat, cheese, potato or spinach. Currants and pine nuts can also be added. The plain version of the börek is called küt böreği and is cut differently. The börek is sold by the kilo.

The person who created and popularised this börek is Mehmet Ali Bey, who is the founder of the Tarihi Sarıyer Börekçisi pastry.

== See also ==
- Çiğ börek
