= Circassian chicken =

Shredded chicken with walnut sauce

- Type: Appetizer
- Place of origin: Circassia
- Region or state: Circassia
- Main ingredients: Chicken, walnuts

Circassian chicken (Adyghe: Адыгэ чэты; Kabardian: Адыгэ джэд) is a dish of shredded boiled chicken served under or in a rich paste made with crushed walnuts, and stock thickened with stale bread. Circassian chicken is a classic Circassian dish, adopted by the Imperial Ottoman cuisine. Although it was typically served as a main course, it became popular as an appetizer. Being an Imperial-era dish, it can also be found in other cuisines of the Eastern Mediterranean. A similar walnut sauce and a chicken dish made with this sauce is known as satsivi in Georgian cuisine.

== See also ==
- List of chicken dishes
