= Kol böreği =

Type of börek

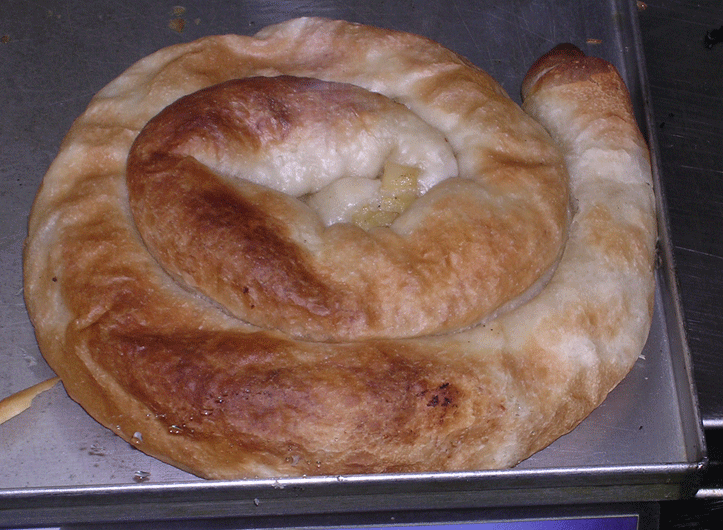
- Course: Main course
- Place of origin: Turkey
- Serving temperature: Hot
- Main ingredients: Lamb, ground meat, beyaz peynir, spinach, potato and phyllo.

Kol böreği ("Arm börek"), also known as maznik (Macedonian: мазник), is a Turkish puff pastry prepared in long rolls, traditionally filled with cheese, potatoes, spinach, or meat, and baked at a low temperature. They are named after their long arm-like appearance.

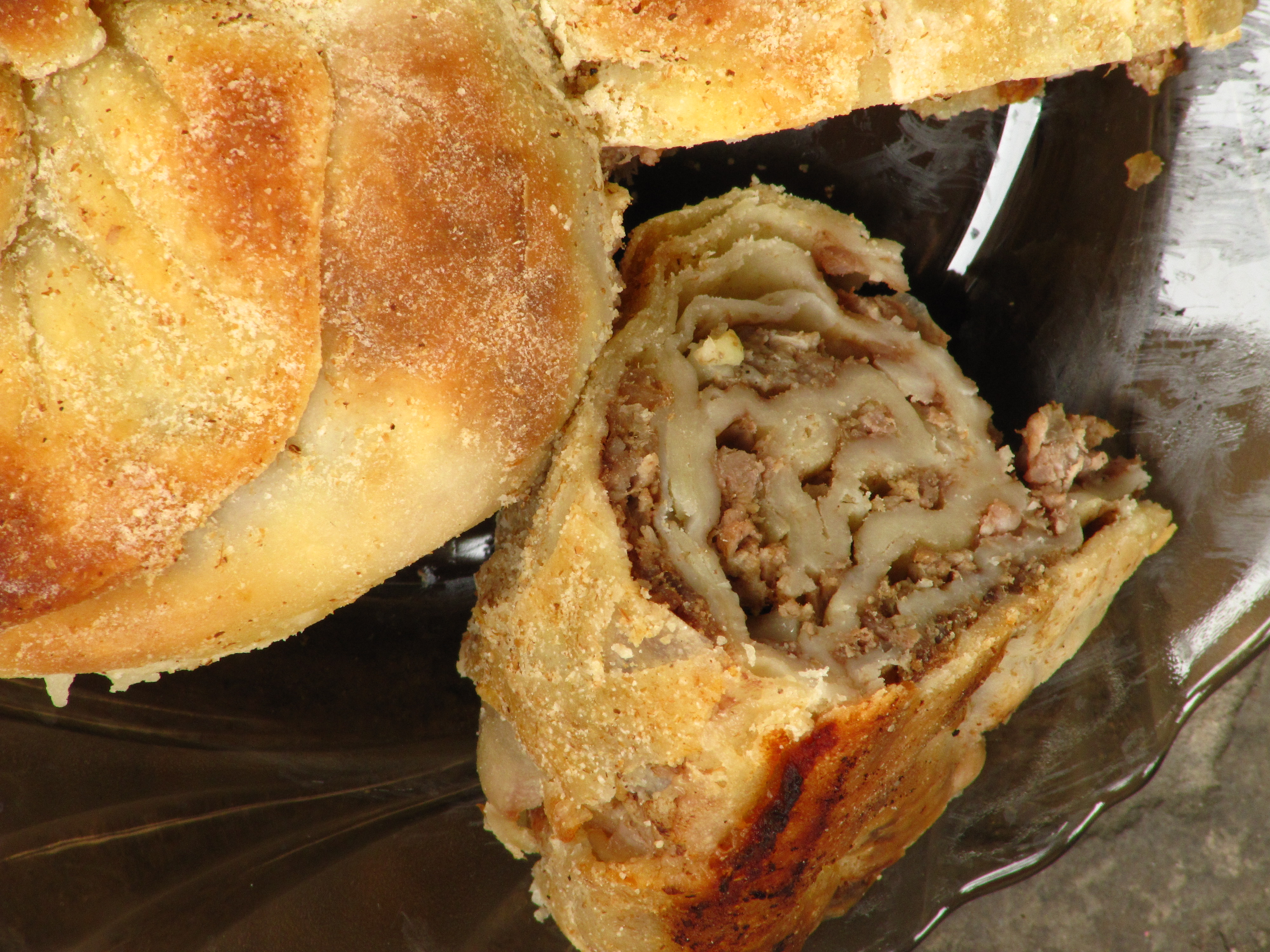
Sarburma (Etli kol böreği)

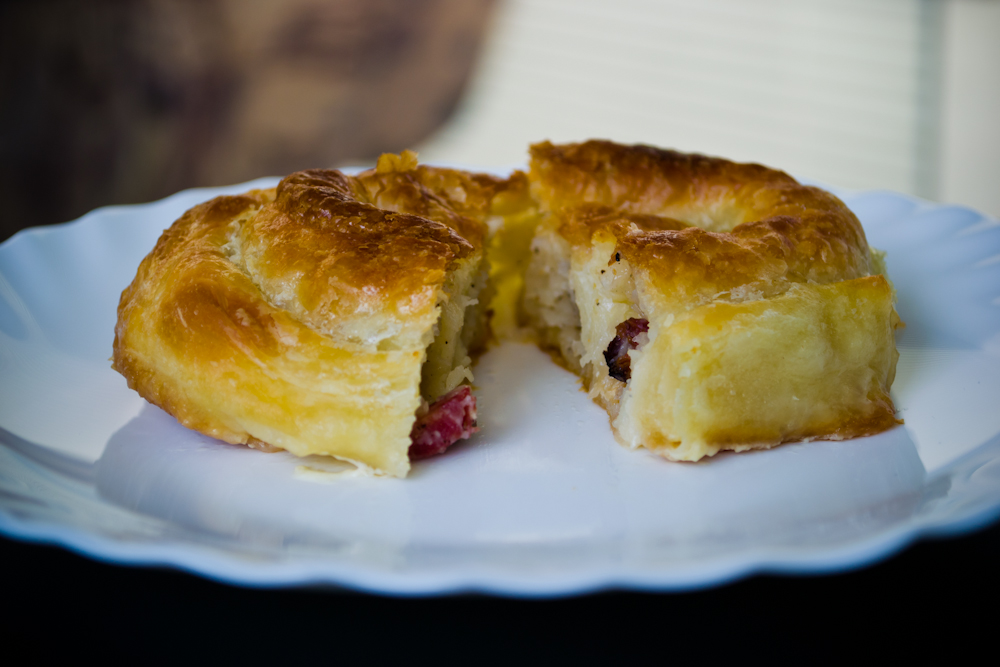
Krompiruša (Patatesli kol böreği)

== See also ==
- Çiğ börek
- List of lamb dishes
- Sarıyer böreği
