= Kalitsounia =

Cheese or herb treat associated with Crete

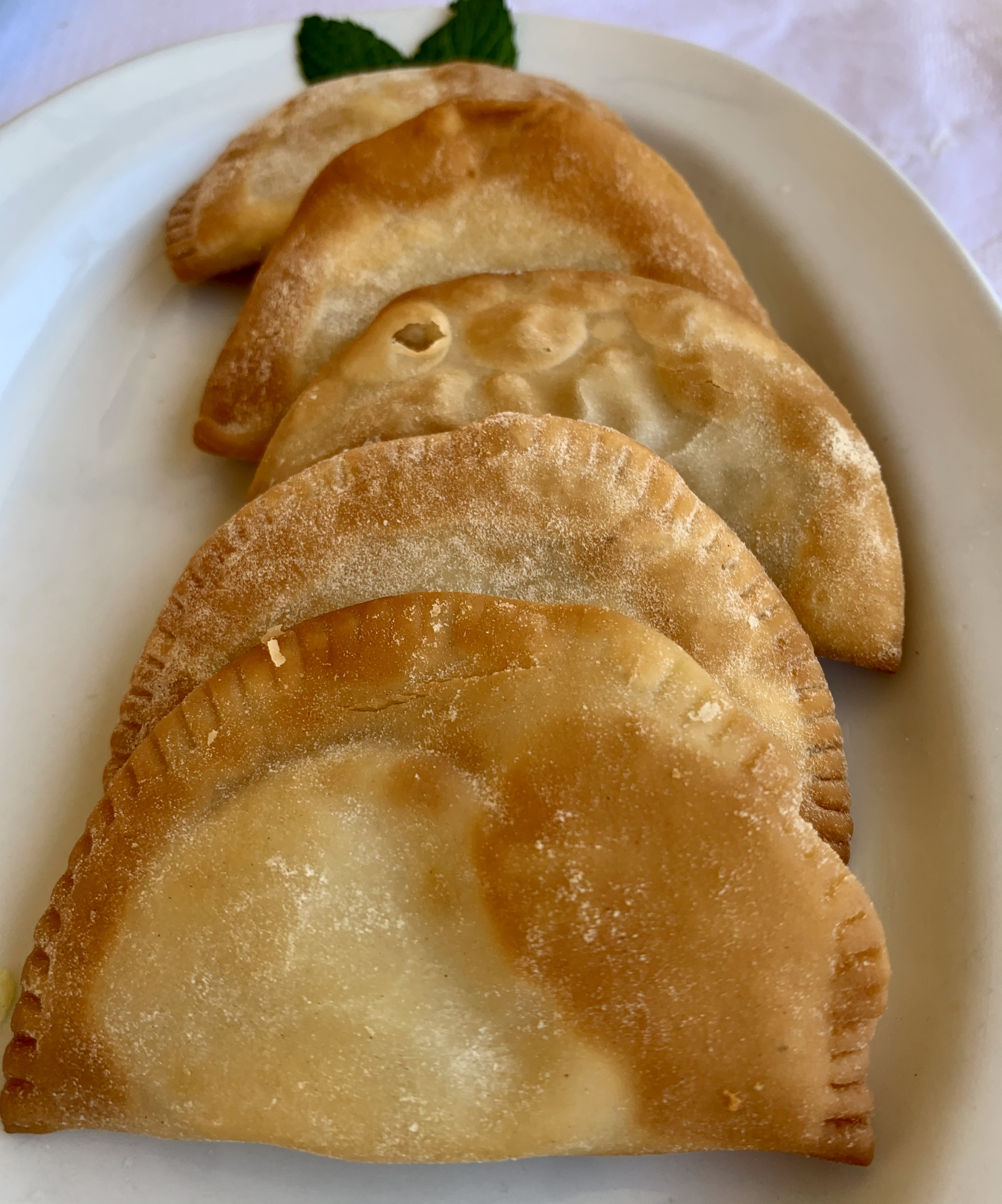
- Course: Snack, Appetizer
- Place of origin: Greece
- Region or state: Crete
- Main ingredients: Flour, mizithra and honey

Kalitsounia (Greek: καλιτσούνια) are small cheese or herb snacks associated with the Greek island of Crete. They can be described as a treat, with different filling and serving variations. In the Chania region, salty kalitsounia are found, stuffed with the locally made mild whey cheese mizithra, or various herbs from the Cretan land (without cheese) and the sweet kalitsounia, also stuffed with mizithra but with honey poured on top. In the Lasithi region, they are mainly sweet, made with dough and filled with mizithra, cinnamon, and sometimes lemon zest.

To make the filling for cheese kalitsounia, the whey cheese is grated and mixed with eggs (so the filling will hold together) and finely chopped herbs.

This is a unique delicacy served across the entire island. In the Chania prefecture, it can be found throughout popular restaurants as well as in small mountainous villages. Kalitsounia can be either baked or fried depending on whether they are made with dough or filo.

== See also ==
- Calisson
- Börek
- Gözleme
- Puri (food)
- Chiburekki
- Haliva
- List of stuffed dishes
