= Crimean Tatar cuisine =

Culinary traditions of Crimean Tatars

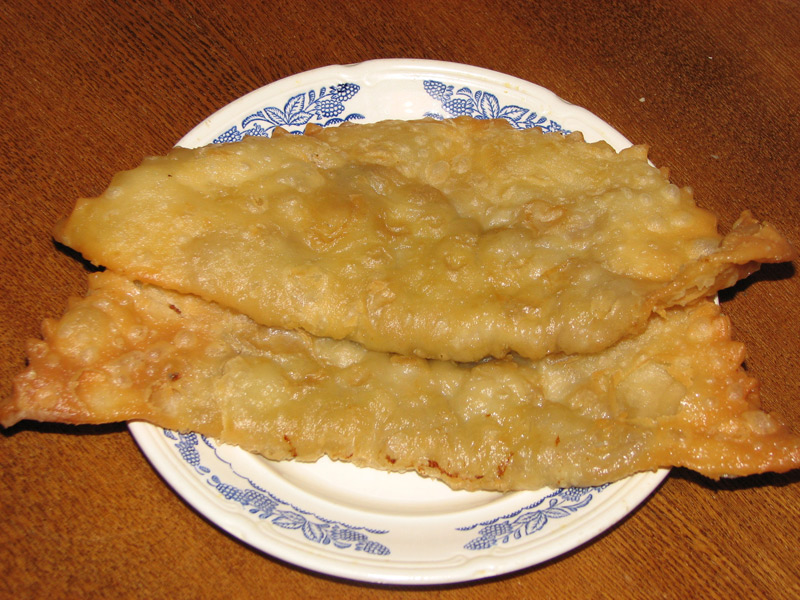
Chiburekki (Chiberek)

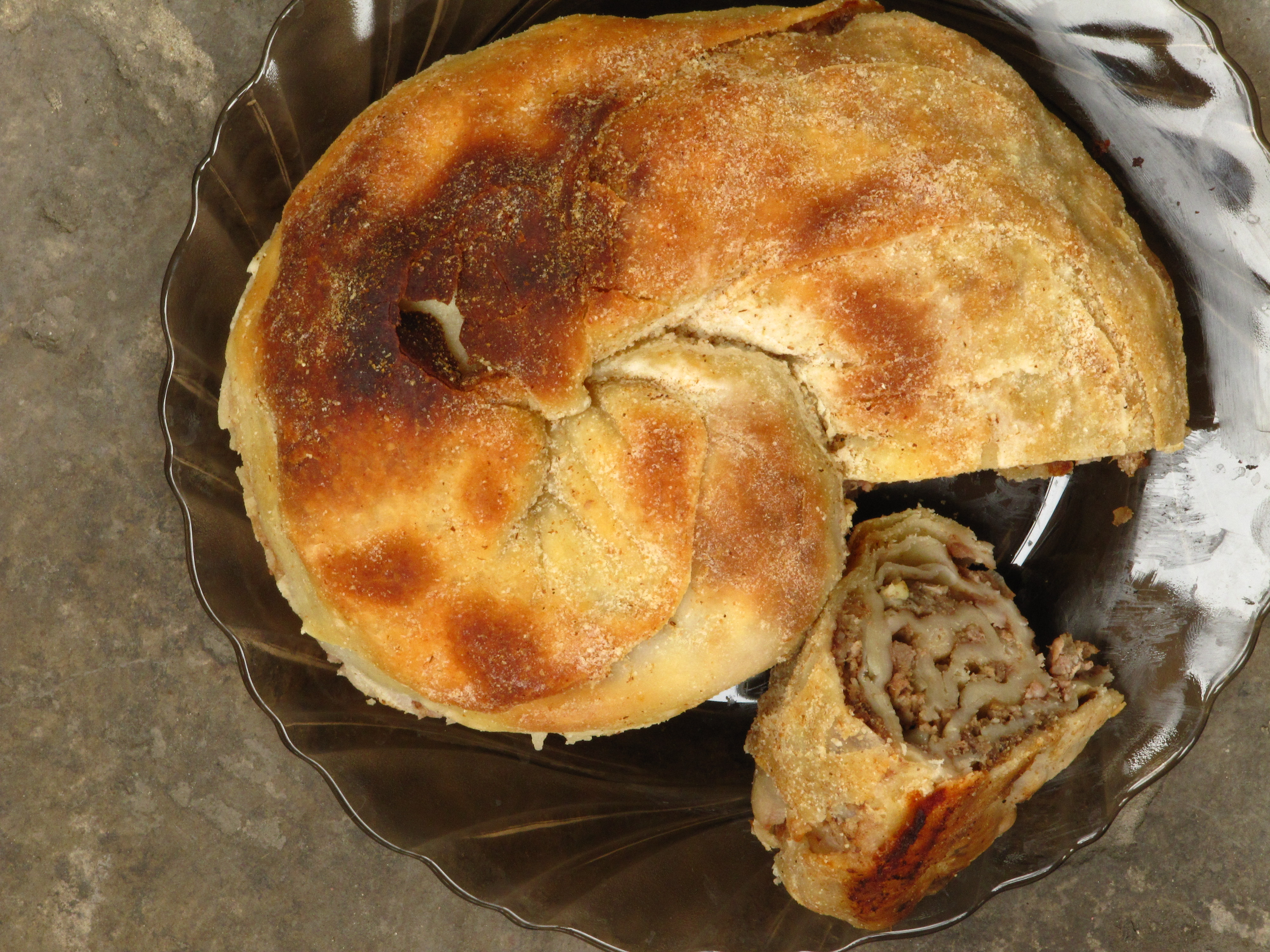
Burma

Crimean Tatar cuisine is primarily the cuisine of the Crimean Tatars, who live on the Crimean Peninsula. The traditional cuisine of the Crimean Tatars has similarities with that of Greeks, Italians, Balkan peoples, Nogais, North Caucasians, and Volga Tatars, although some national dishes and dietary habits vary between different Crimean Tatar regional subgroups; for example, fish and produce are more popular among Yaliboylu and Tat dishes while meat and dairy is more prevalent in Steppe Tatar cuisine. Many Uzbek dishes were incorporated into Crimean Tatar national cuisine during exile in Central Asia since 1944, and these dishes have become prevalent in Crimea since the return. Uzbek samsa, laghman, and plov (pilaf) are sold in most Tatar roadside cafes in Crimea as national dishes. In turn, some Crimean Tatar dishes, including Chiburekki, have been adopted by peoples outside Crimea, such as in Turkey and the North Caucasus.

== Traditional dishes ==
- Çiberek (or chiburekki) is a fried turnover with a filling of ground or minced meat and onions. Made with one round piece of dough folded over the filling in a half-moon shape. A national dish of Crimean Tatars, it is also popular in Crimean Tatar diasporas in Turkey, Romania, Russia, and Uzbekistan.
- Burma, a traditional Crimean meat pie dish
- Yantiq, a çiberek that is grilled, not fried.
- Köbete, a traditional pie with a rice-and-chicken filling baked between two layers of dough. Served as a main course, köbete can be made with alternative fillings, such as rice and meat, meat with potatoes and onions, or even potatoes and cheese.
- Tabaq börek, small dumplings with a meat filling cooked in a broth and served as a main dish or in a soup (qashiq börek).
- Göbädiä (or gubadia), a wedding pie with layers of meat, rice, chopped eggs, raisins, and qurt (dry white cheese).
- Shorba, a meat soup with large pieces of beef and mutton, onion, carrots, and other vegetables.
- Baqla ash, a soup made from green peas or beans, a vegetarian dish.
- Sheker qiyiqs, a traditional dessert.
- Dolma, bell pepper with meat
- Sarma, meat wrapped in grape leaves
- Beshbarmaq, a dish which is especially popular among a steppe sub-ethnic group
- Ayran, a national drink
- Pite, a traditional bread
- Tatar (qashiq) ash

== See also ==
- Tatar cuisine
- Russian cuisine
- Ukrainian cuisine
