= Haliva =

Fried dough turnover

Haleva
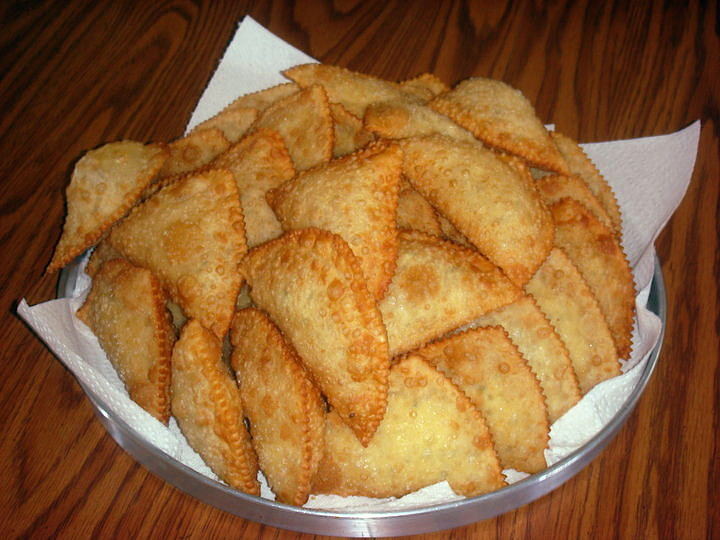
- Haliva
- Course: Main course
- Place of origin: Circassia
- Serving temperature: Hot
- Main ingredients: Beef, leek, cheese or potato

Haleva or haliva (Adyghe: хьэлжъо [ħalʐʷa]) is a fried dough turnover filled with either potatoes or Circassian cheese, and well known popular dish in the Circassian cuisine.

== Variations ==
- Haliva stuffed with cottage cheese (Helive q'wey lhalhe delhu)
- Haliva stuffed with potato (Helive ch'ert'of delhu)
- Haliva stuffed with potato and cheese (Helive ch'ert'ofre q'weyre delhu)
- Haliva stuffed with haricot beans (Heliva jesh delhu)
- Haliva stuffed with pears (Helive q'wzch delhu)

== See also ==
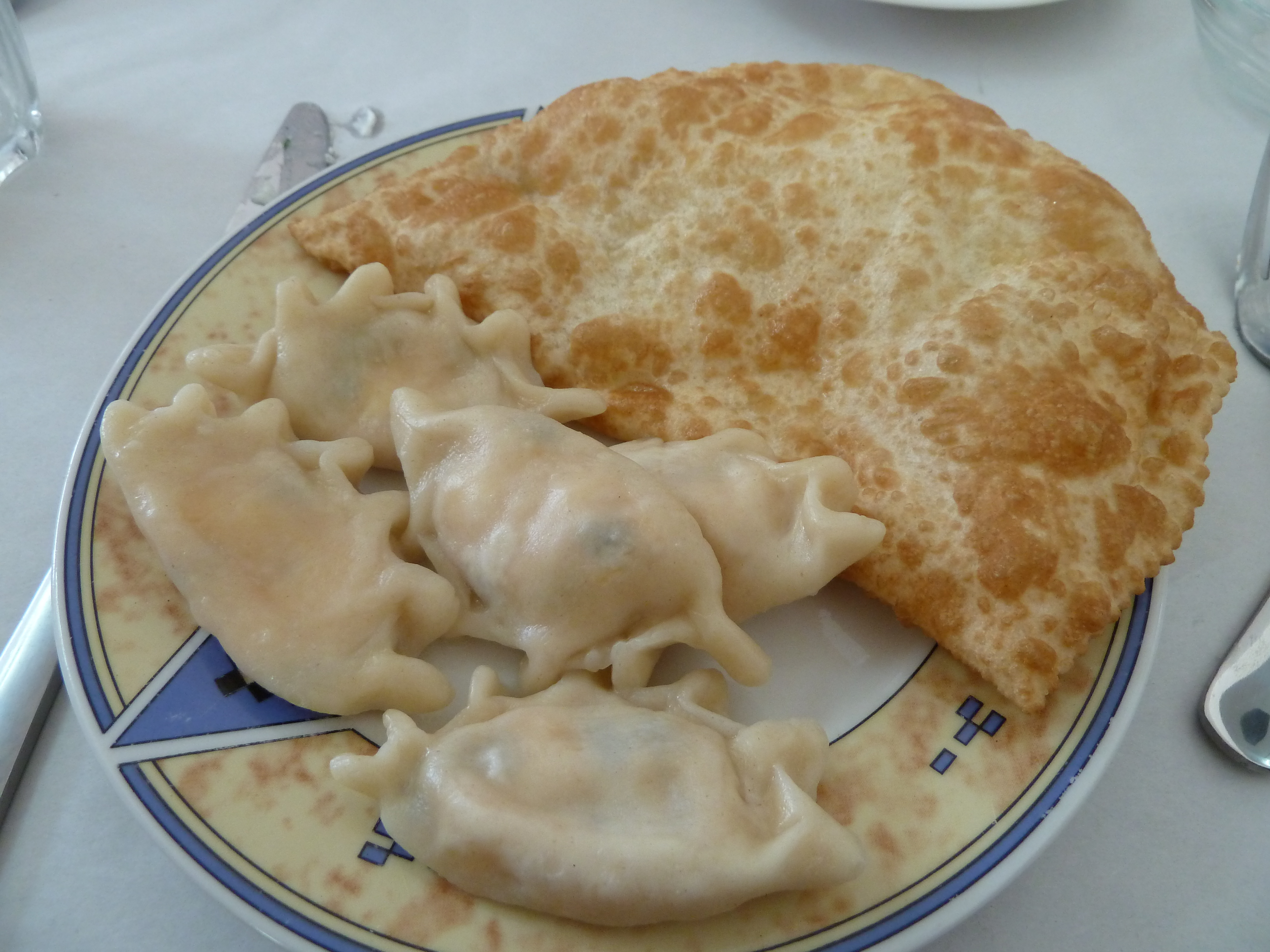
Haliva and mataz, two traditional Adyghe snacks

- Chebureki
- Qutab
- Lörtsy
- Börek
- Gözleme
- Puri
- Kalitsounia
- Calzone
- Curry puff
- Empanada
- Khuushuur
- Lángos
- Momo
- Pastel
- Pasty
- Plăcintă
- Puff pastry
- Samosa
