= Yantiq =

Crimean Tatar food

Cantiq
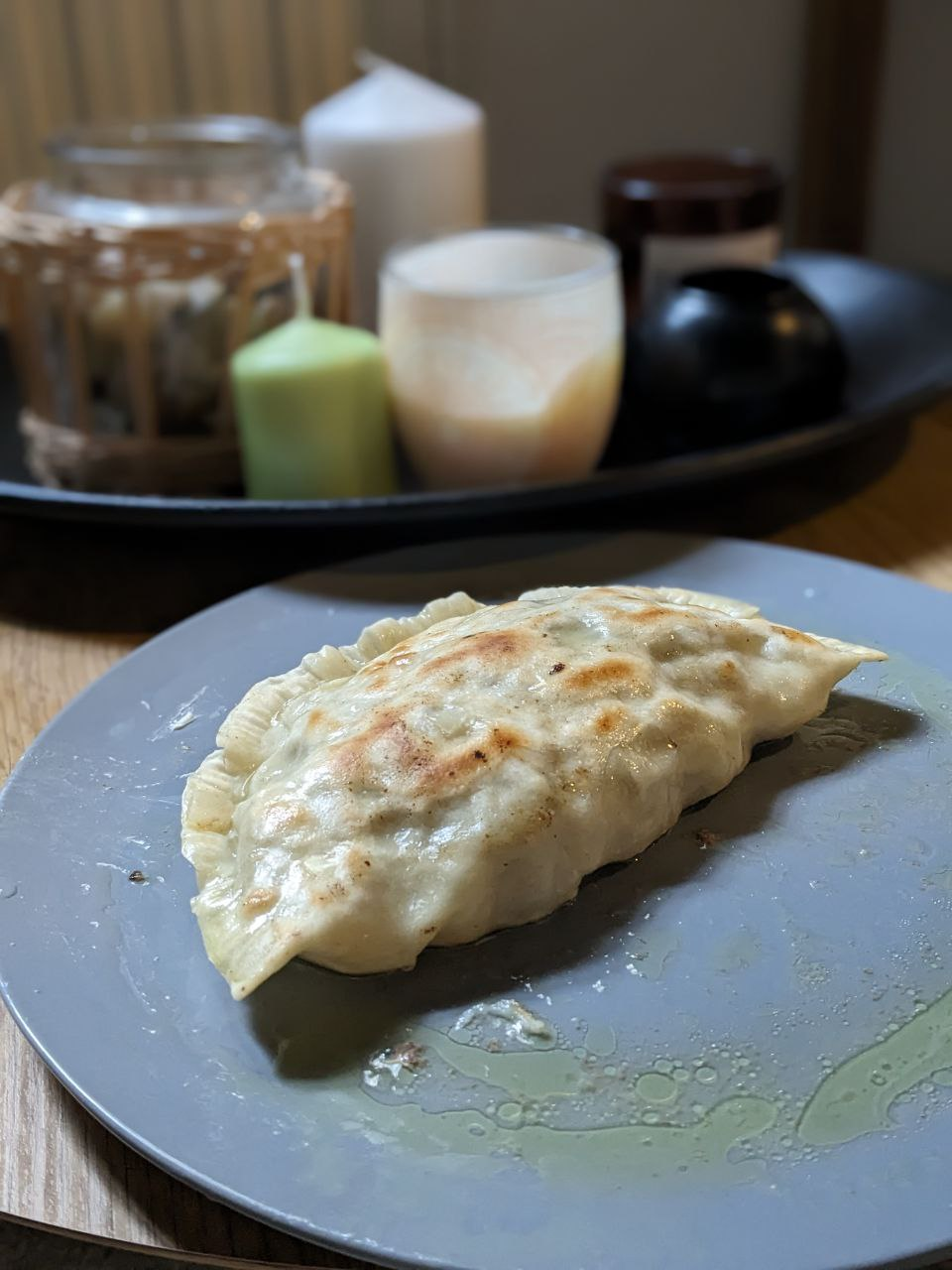
- Course: Main course
- Place of origin: Crimea
- Serving temperature: Hot
- Main ingredients: Beef, leek

Yantiq or yantyk (Crimean Tatar: yantıq, Turkish: cantık, Ukrainian: янтик) is a Crimean Tatar turnover. Unlike a cheburek, a yantiq is grilled without oil, not deep-fried.

== See also ==
- Chebureki
