= Qutab =

Turkmen and Azerbaijani dough dish

- Kükü and Gutab
- Course: Mainly as an appetizer (small size) Sometimes as the main course (large size)
- Place of origin: Turkmenistan, Azerbaijan and Turkey
- Serving temperature: Hot
- Main ingredients: Beef, leek, pumpkin
- Variations: Yashyl qutab (green qutab), qutab with pumpkin, butternut squash gutab (kädili gutab), butternut gutab, qarın qutabı, shamakhy qutab, corat gutab, dəvə qutab

Qutab, or Gutab is a traditional dish in Azerbaijani, Turkmen and Turkish cuisine, made from thinly rolled dough that is filled with a variety of ingredients and cooked briefly on a convex griddle called a saj. This versatile and popular dish comes in many variations, with fillings ranging from savory meats, herbs, and pumpkin to more unconventional ingredients like minced sheep intestines. Usually served as an appetizer and comes in a small size. Some regions of Azerbaijan and Turkmenistan make larger versions where qutab then acts as a main course.

Qutab is known for its light yet flavorful nature, often served as a snack, appetizer, or light meal, accompanied by yogurt, sumac, or a dipping sauce. Its preparation requires skill to roll the dough thinly and fold it into the signature half-moon shape. It holds cultural significance in Turkmenistan, Turkey and Azerbaijan, often enjoyed during family gatherings or celebrations.

== Composition ==
When the weather gets warmer, the number of dishes made from wild plants increases. Qutab is made by creating a stiff dough from flour, water, eggs, and salt. The dough is rolled into a thin circular layer and the middle of each circle filled with stuffing before finally being folded into a crescent shape. The resulting patties are griddled on both sides and served by pouring over butter on top. Gutab is usually served with yoghurt with green coriander, fennel and sumac.

== Variations ==
There are many variations of qutab: usually, pumpkin and greens are used as fillings. There are also Shamakhy qutab, Yashyl Qutab and Qarın qutabı, quzu qutabı (lamb), deve qutabi specific for Jorat settlement. They are regional variations of qutab in Turkmenistan and Azerbaijan.

There are several types of qutab, depending on the filling:

- Meat Qutab: Ground lamb or beef, mixed with onions and herbs.
- Herb Qutab: Made with greens such as spinach, dill, and cilantro.
- Pumpkin Qutab: Mashed pumpkin spiced for flavor.
- Spinach Gutab: A Turkmen variety using spinach and spices.
- Intestine Qutab: Made using minced sheep intestines, often combined with meat and onions. A southern Azeri version.

Different regions of Turkmenistan and Azerbaijan have their own unique versions of qutab:

- Shamakhi qutab: A regional variation from Shamakhi.
- Butternut gutab: A regional variation from Merv.
- Butternut squash gutab/Kädili Gutab: A regional variation from Ashgabat.
- Jorat qutab: Also known as "Corat Qutabi," this version is smaller than the normal size and contains camel meat.
- Ganja qutab: Known as "Kete" in the western part of the country, it is much larger and includes greens or ground beef inside the dough.
- Çeburek Gutap: A fried Turkmen variety of gutab filled with meat.
- Nakhchivan qutab: Called "Kete" and has a rectangular shape. It is cooked in a clay oven called "Tandir".
- Gyzzyrma Gutap: A cooked Turkmen variety that is filled with 10 different spices and meat.

== See also ==
- Chiburekki
- Gözleme
- Haliva
- Qottab
- Zhingyalov hats
