= Circassian cuisine =

Culinary traditions of Circassia

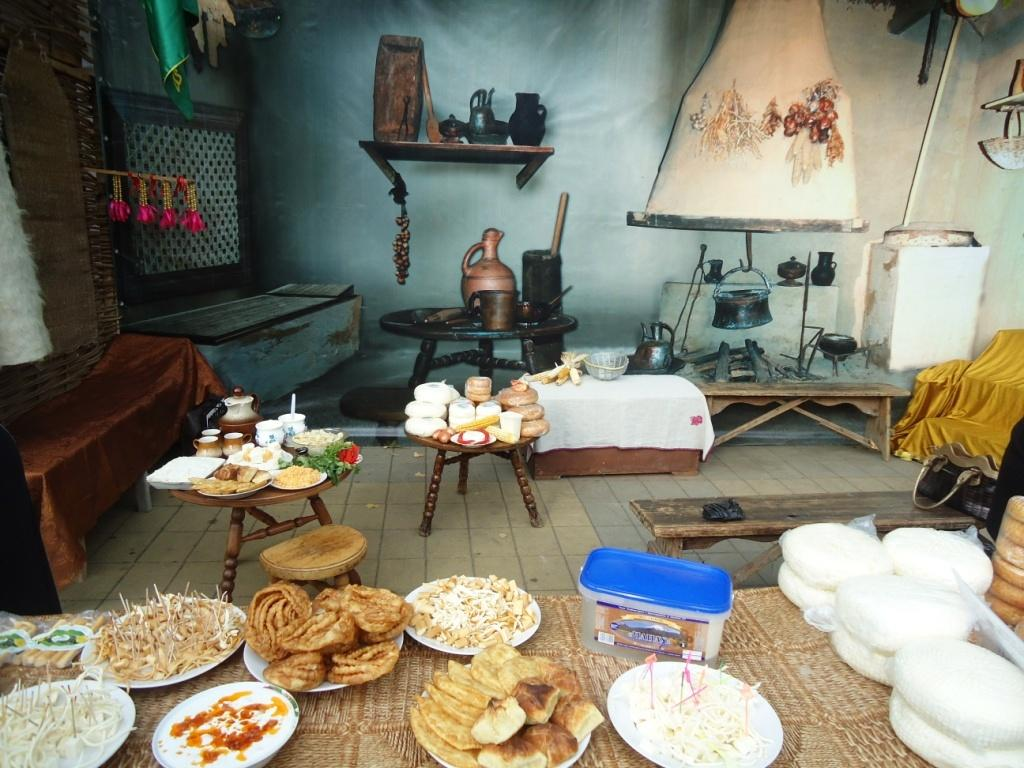
Traditional Circassian house and cuisine

Circassian cuisine is an ethnic cuisine, based on the cooking style and traditions of the Circassian people of the North Caucasus. This region lies between the Black Sea and the Caspian Sea, within European Russia.

== Traditional dishes ==
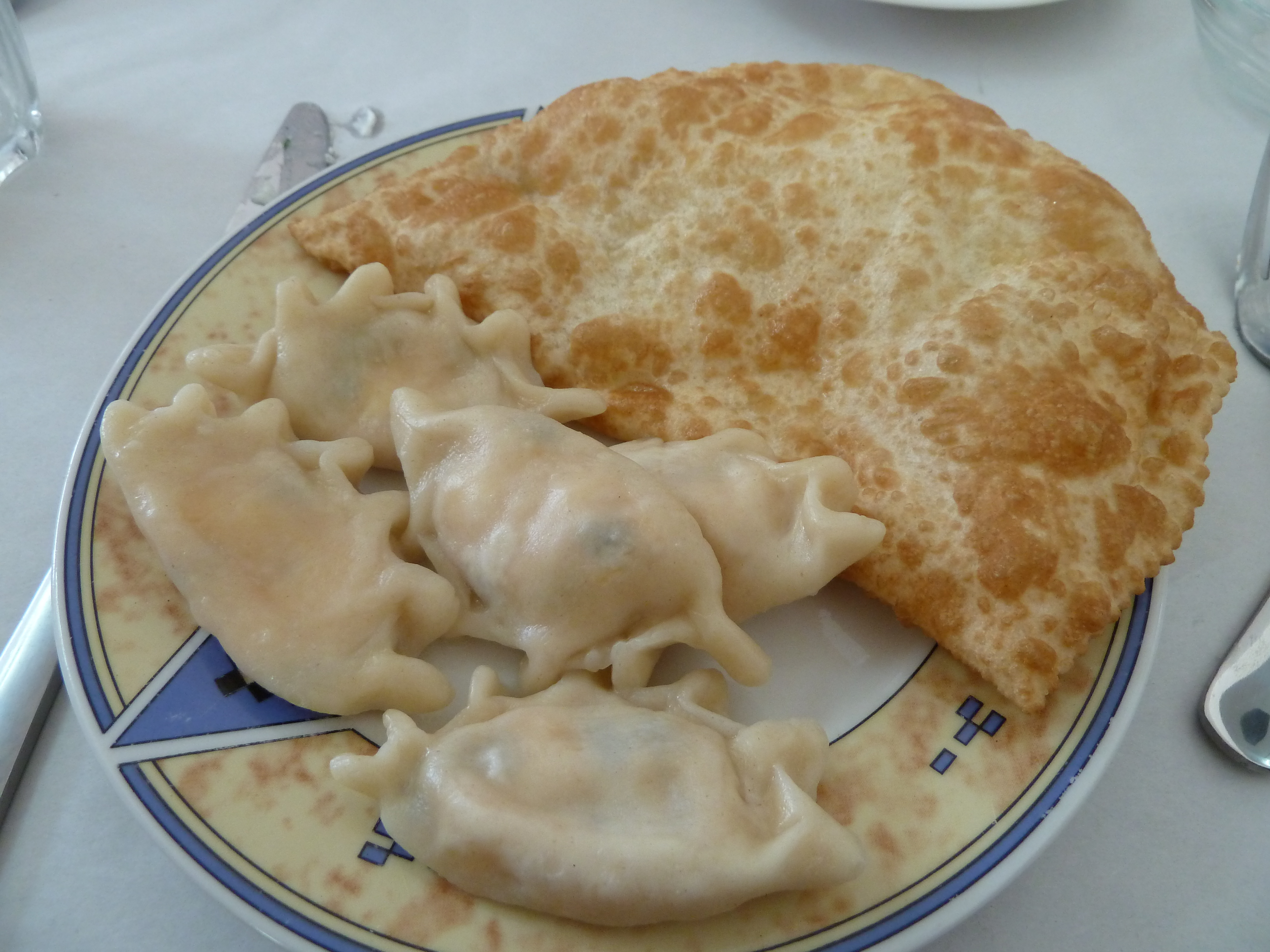
Haliva (Хьэлжъо) and mataz (Мэтазэ), two of the prominent traditional Circassian snacks

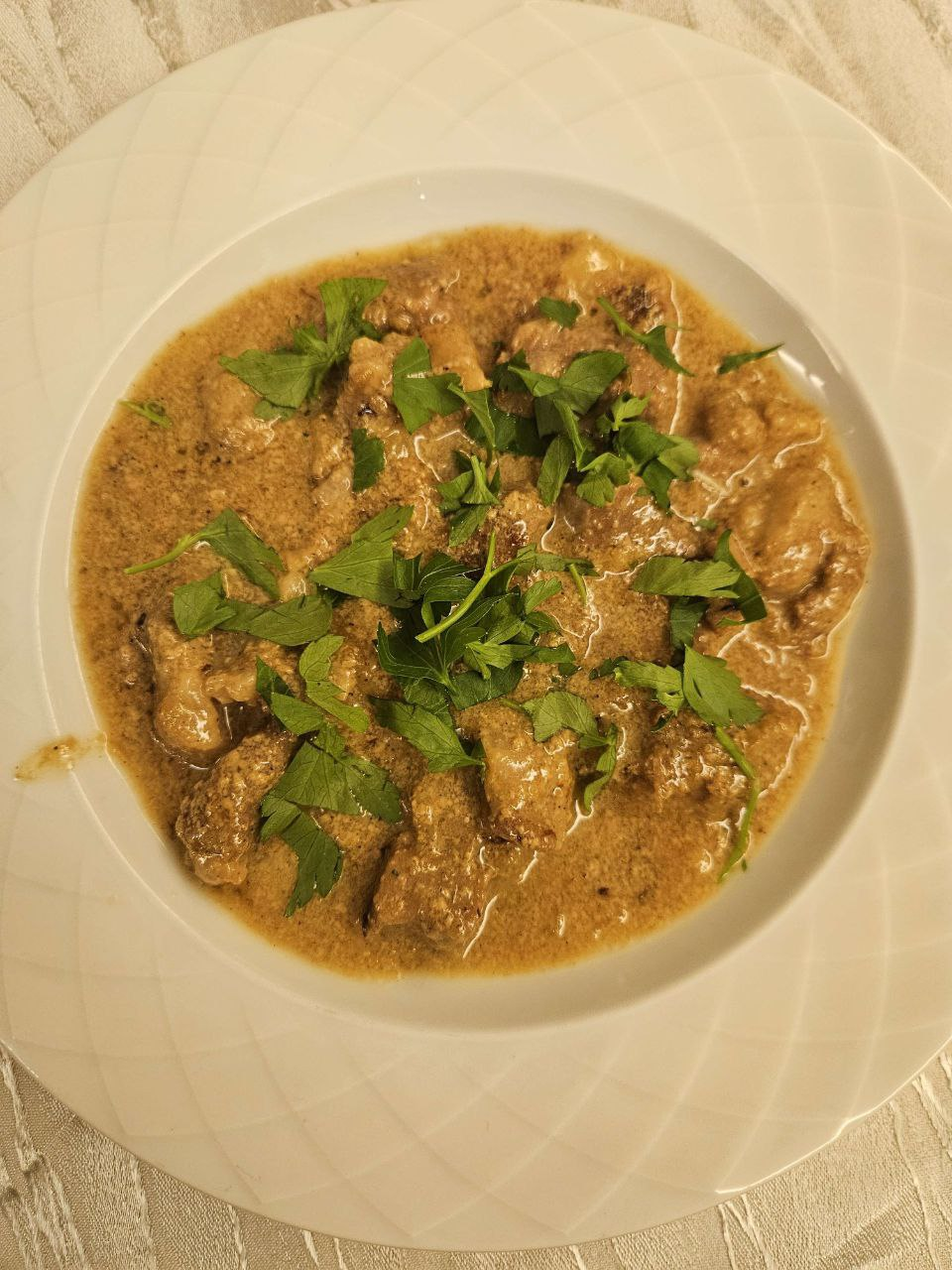
Circassian creamy lamb stew (Щатэ лыбжъ)

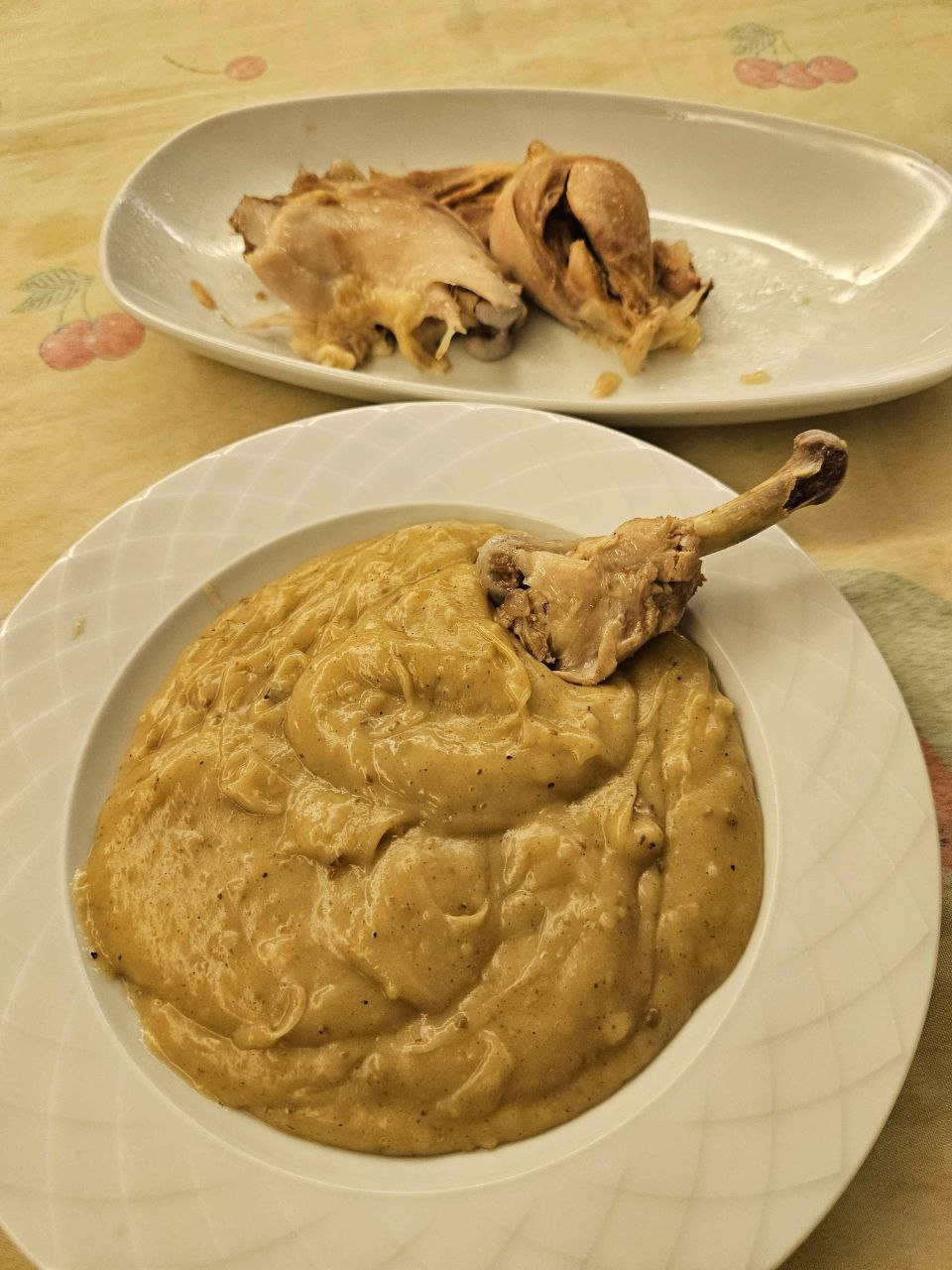
Shipsi (шыпсы; Circassian gravy) & Chicken

Circassian cuisine consists of many different traditional dishes, varying by season. The summer time traditional dishes are mainly dairy products and vegetables. In winter and spring, the traditional dishes mostly consist of flour and meat. Traditional dishes include ficcin, seasoned chicken or turkey with sauce, boiled mutton and beef with a seasoning of sour milk along with salt and crushed garlic.

Among the many varieties of cheese in the North Caucasus, Circassian cheese is the most popular one.

On holidays, the Adyghe people traditionally make haliva (хьэлжъо) from toasted millet or wheat flour.

In the Levant, there is a widely–recognized Circassian dish known as tajen alsharkaseiah.

== Fresh meat dishes (Lisch'em qixasch'ich' shxinighwexer) ==
- Circassian goulash (Libzche)
- Circassian creamy lamb stew (Щатэ лыбжъ)
- Meat goulash (Lits'ik'wlibzche)
- Lamb boiled in cream (Shateps-ch'e gheva schinel)
- Liver in fat (Themschighwr schem k'wets'ilhu)
- Liver sausage (Themsch'ighwnibe)
- Liver with sheep's-tail fat (Themsch'ighwre ch'apere zesch'ighwu)
- Thick pancake with liver and eggs (Themschighwre jedich'ere zexelhu)
- Sheep sausage (Zherume)
- Fried sheep's tail fat with honey (Ch'ape ghezchare fore)
- Sheep's tail fat cracklings (Ch'ape libzchaxwe)
- Sheep's tail fat with honey (Ch'ape daghefo)
- Shepherd's lamb (Melix'we li ghezchech'e)
- Boiled mutton (Melil gheva)
- Thin mutton sausage (Nek'wlh)

== Dried and smoked meat dishes (Li gheghwamre gheghwpts'amre qixasch'ich' shxinighwexer) ==
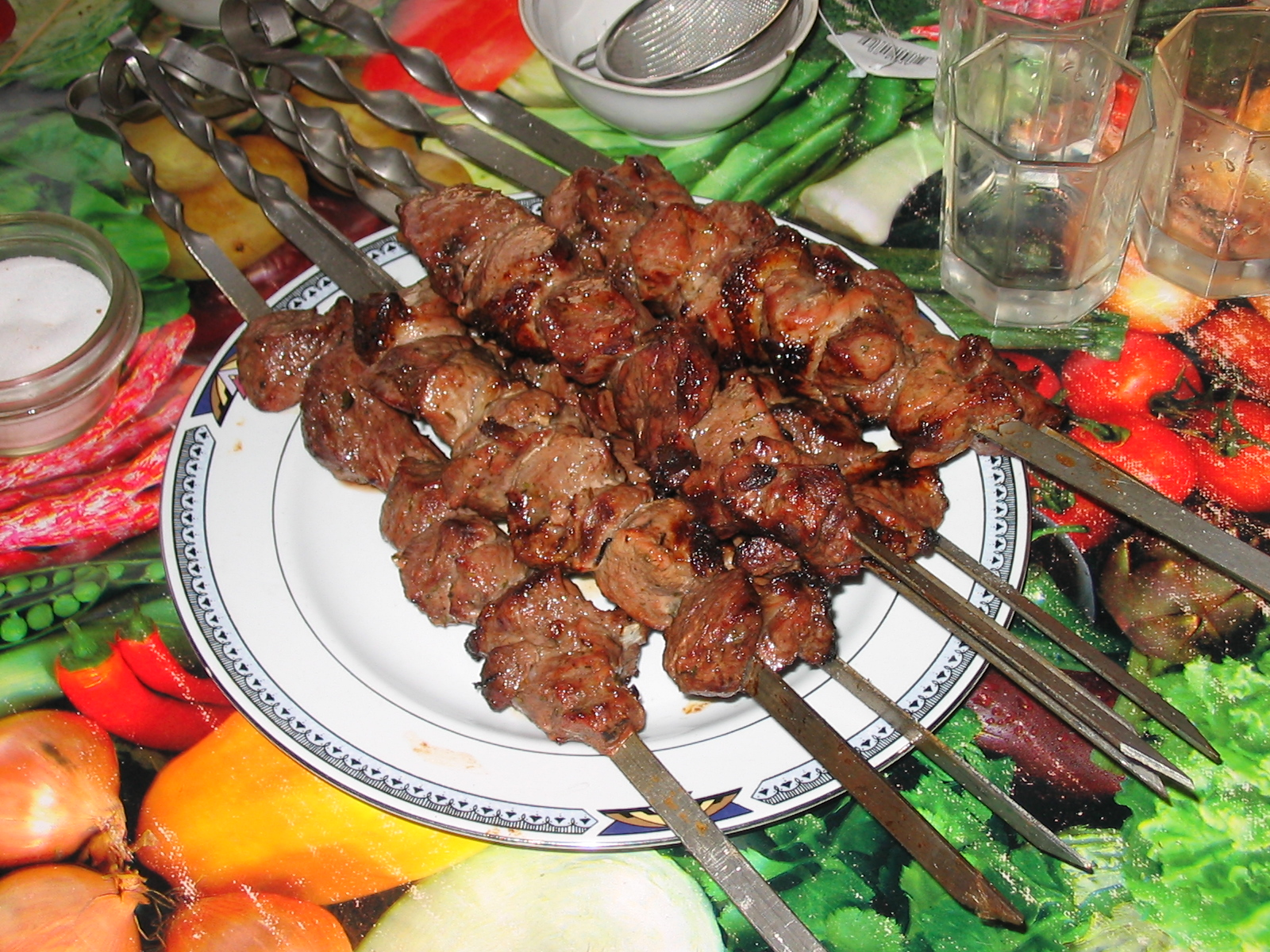
Shashlik

- Fried meat (Li teibech'e ghezchawe)
- Fried meat and potatoes (Lire ch'ert'ofre zesch'elhu ghezchawe)
- Fried meat with onions (Lim bzchin sch'elhu)
- Meat and beans broth (Lire jeshre xelhu leps)
- Meat and noodles (Li xelhu x'inch'el)
- Meat and potato broth (Lire ch'ert'ofre xelhu leps)
- Meat roasted on skewers, shashlik (Li dzasech'e ghezchawe)
- Dried sheep's side (Dzazhe gheghwa)
- Smoked meat goulash (Lighwpts'a libzche)

== Poultry and egg dishes (Jedqazimre jedich'emre qixasch'ich' shxinighwexer) ==
- Boiled chicken with garlic (Jed gheva bzchinixw yi ghwsew)
- Broasted chicken (Jedla)
- Chicken fried in a brazier (Jed teibech'e ghezchawe)
- Chicken with new potatoes (Jedisch'ere ch'ert'ofisch'ere zesch'elhu)
- Chicken and noodles (Jedir x'inch'elim xelhu)
- Chicken in pepper sauce (Jedlibzche shibzhiy ships sch'etu)
- Chicken in soured cream sauce, Jadlibja (Jedlibzche)
- Chicken in walnut sauce (Jed de ships sch'etu)
- Fried chicken with onion (Jed ghezcha bzchin sch'elhu)
- Stuffed chicken baked in dough (Thevim k'wets'ighezchihawe jed)
- Shipsi (Circassian gravy) & Chicken
- Eggs fried in soured cream (Jedich'eneqiyzh)
- Boiled goose or duck (Qaz, e babisch, gheva)
- Goose (duck) with noodles (Qaz, e babisch, x'inch'elim xelhu)
- Baked goose (duck) stuffed with Rice (Qaz, e babisch, ghezcha prunzh k'wets'ilhu)
- Jadichevinsh (Jedich'evinsh, Schheqwtih)
- Sweet omelette (Jedich'ezchapx'e 'ef')
- Pastry straws, twiglets (Jedich'eripsch)
- Boiled turkey (Gwegwsh gheva)
- Stuffed turkey (Gwegwsh ghezcha)

== Fish dishes (Bdzezchey shxinighwexer) ==
- Fried fish (Bdzezchey ghezcha)
- Fried fish in soured cream (Bdzezchey shatech'e ghezchawe)

== Dairy product dishes ==
- Bajina (Bejine)
- Baked milk (She sch'eghepschtha)
- Cheese (Q'wey)
- Fried cheese (Q'wey ghezcha)
- Hominy or polenta (Zhemikwe)
- Kurt (Qwrt)
- Shkuz (Shxwz) – This kind of milk preserve is not used in contemporary times. It used to be prepared for winter.
- Sour milk (Shxw)
- Soured cream sauce with cheese (Q'weyzchapx'e)

== Flour, cereal and navy-bean dishes ==
- Lakum (Lequm)
- Haliva stuffed with offal (Helive zchenfen delhu), cottage cheese (Helive q'wey lhalhe delhu), potatoes (Helive ch'ert'of delhu), potatoes and cheese (Helive ch'ert'ofre q'weyre delhu), navy beans (Heliva jesh delhu) or pears (Helive q'wzch delhu)
- Potato and cheese pie (Delen ch'ert'ofre q'weyre delhu)
- Cottage-cheese (Delen q'wey lhalhe delhu) and cottage cheese and scallion pie (Delen bzchin ts'inere q'wey lhalhere delhu)
- Lapstaipkha (Lepsteipx'e)
- Flaky bread (Sch'aq'we zeteiwp'esch'ich)
- Shalama (Shelame)
- Tkhurimbey (Tx'wrimbey)
- Cornbread, unleavened (Nartixw chirzhin or Nartixw mezhaje) or leavened (Chirzhin gheteja)
- Maize lakum (Nartixw leqwm)
- Maize rolls, with (Sche zixelh hetiq) or without fat (Hetiq)
- Unleavened millet bread (Xw chirzhin or Xw mezhaje)
- Miramisa (Miramise)
- Hakurt or hakut (Heqwrt or heqwt)
- Boiled (Nartixwsch'e gheva) or roasted (Nartixwsch'e ghezcha) corn on the cob
- Corn flakes (Nartixw ghep'ench'a)
- Maize (Nartixw hel'ame) or millet halama (Xw hel'ame)
- Kilish (Qilish)
- Wheat (P'aste) or maize pasta (Nartixw p'aste)
- Sok (Sok)
- Shopransy (Shopransiy)
- Khubala (Xwbela)
- Millet soup (Hentx'wps)
- Boiled barley (Hegwlive)
- Ashira (Eshiri, eshire, eshri or eshre)
- Khudir (X'wdir)
- Khudirbalatsa (X'wdirbelatse)
- Sweet rice pilaf (Prunzh'ef)
- Dumplings (Psiheliva) with meat (Psihelive melil delhu) or chicken (Psihelive jedil delhu)
- Navy-bean sauce (Jesh libzche), soup (Jesh leps) or soup with potatoes (Jesh leps ch'ert'of xelhu)

== Potato and gourd dishes (Ch'ert'of, qeb shxinighwexer) ==
- Baked gourd (Qeb ghezcha)
- Boiled gourd (Qeb gheva)
- Gourd sauce (Qeb ships)
- Potato paste (Ch'ert'of p'aste)
- Fried potatoes (Ch'ert'of zcherikwey)
- New potatoes stewed in soured cream (Ch'ert'ofisch'e shatech'e ghezchawe)
- Potato stewed in soured cream or broth (Ch'ert'ofim ships sch'etu)

== Beverages ==
- Kalmyk tea (Qalmiq shey)
- Makhsima (Maxsime)
- Maramazey (Meremezchey)
- Black tea
- Kefir (Cheyfir / Qundeps)

== Sweets and desserts ==
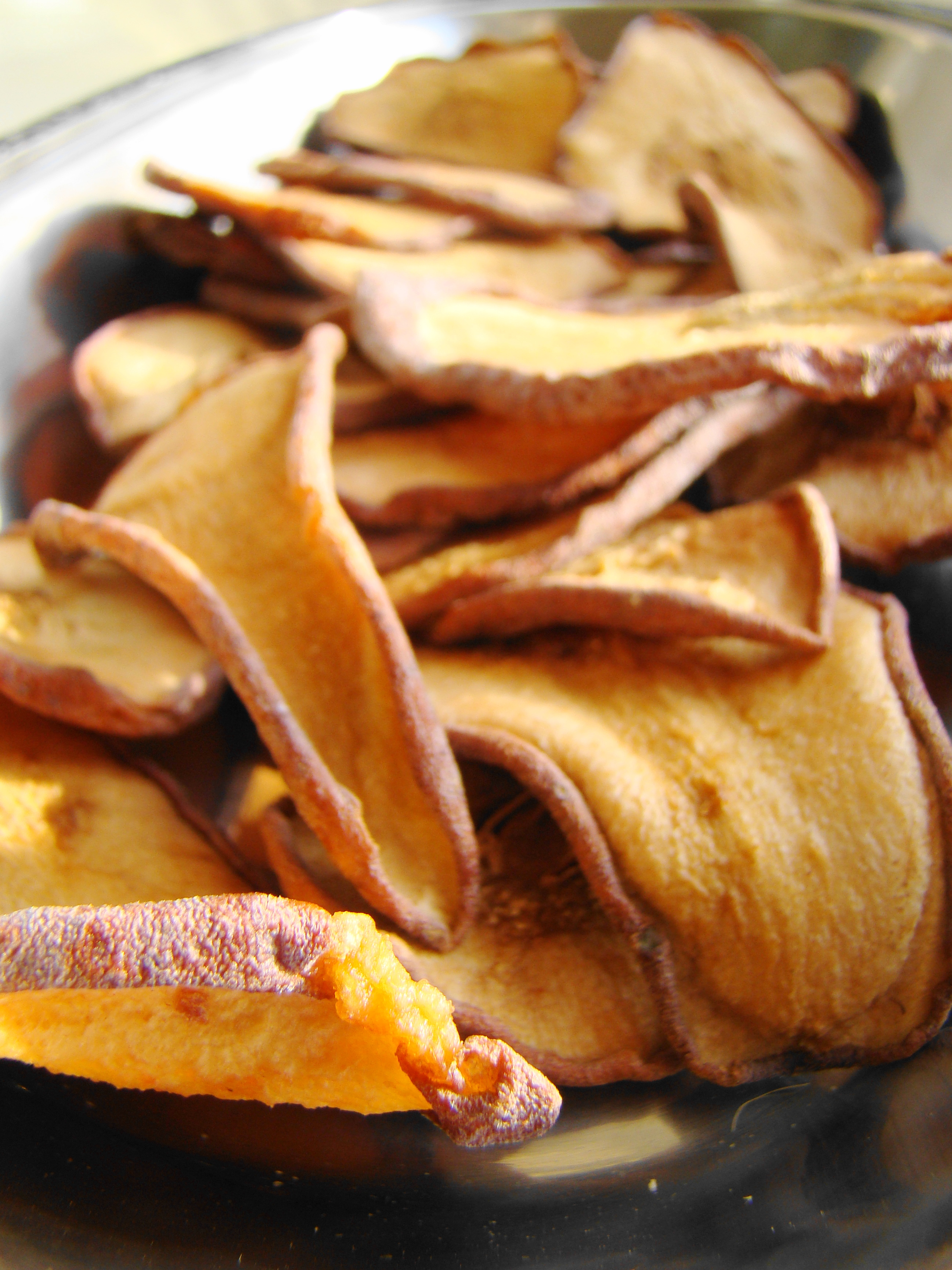
Dried pears

- Haliwa (Heliwe) – sweet, dessert in Arabic
- Marazey (Merezey)
- Nuts with honey (Dere fore zexelhu)
- Dried pears (Q'wzch gheghwa)
- Watermelon honey (X'arbiz fo)
- Zacharis (Zech'eris)
