= Chebureki =

Crimean Tatar savoury pastry

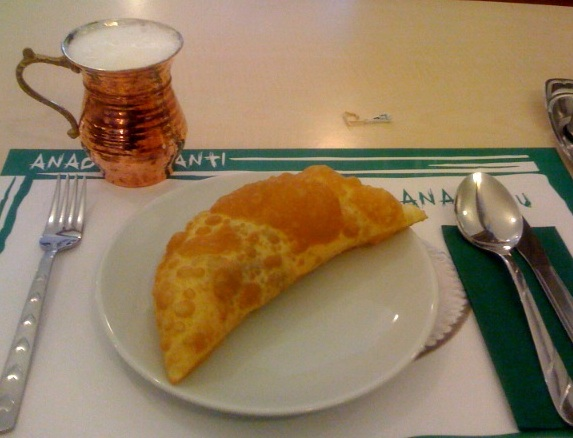
- Çibörek and ayran in a cafe
- Alternative names: Çibörek, çiğ börek
- Course: Main course
- Region or state: Crimean Peninsula
- Created by: Crimean Tatars
- Main ingredients: Lamb or beef
- Food energy (per serving): 283 kcal (1,180 kJ)

Chebureki (Note: from Crimean Tatar: çiberek; via Russian: чебурек, romanized: cheburek, which is the singular; the plural in Russian is Russian: чебуреки, romanized: chebureki; see also wikt:чебурек) (sing. cheburek) are deep-fried turnovers with a filling of ground or minced meat and onions. A popular street dish, they are made with a single round piece of dough folded over the filling in a crescent shape. They have become widespread in Eastern Europe in the 20th century.

Chebureki is a national dish of Crimean Tatar cuisine. They are popular as a snack and street food throughout the Caucasus, West Asia, Central Asia, Lithuania, Latvia, Estonia, Ukraine, Russia, Eastern Europe, as well as in Turkey, Greece and Romania.

== Preparation ==
Chigiriq, traditional Crimean Tatar pastry cutter wheel for making cheburek

A cheburek is a semicircular börek, filled with a very thin layer of ground beef, poultry meat, lamb or basically any ground meat which has been seasoned with ground onion and black pepper.

The dough is made of flour, water (usually of a baker percentage of ~50%), salt, and oil. It is soft and pliable, but not sticky. It is separated into small balls and each is rolled out with a thin rolling pin. Additional flour is added only as needed to prevent the dough from sticking.

The meat fill is layered thinly enough that it will cook fully in the sealed half-moon pocket.

Finally, the whole is fried in oil (usually sunflower oil or corn oil) until the dough becomes golden.

== Etymology ==
Among Crimean Tatars, the pastry is referred to as Şırbörek, Çiborek, and other phonologically similar derivations of these words. From old-Turkic, börek means pastry, and the Şır- morpheme is an onomatopoeia of the sizzling sounds created while frying the pastry. The “Çi-” part derives from the Turkic word “iç” meaning “inside” or “within” as the stuffing is inside/within the cooked bread.

In modern Turkish, the name is written as çiğ börek, a corruption of the Crimean Tatar name based on a false etymology associating the first part of the name with çiğ, literally meaning "raw." In contrast to dishes such as çiğ köfte (raw meatballs), çiğ börek is a cooked dish that more closely resembles içli köfte. It is very popular, especially in Eskişehir.

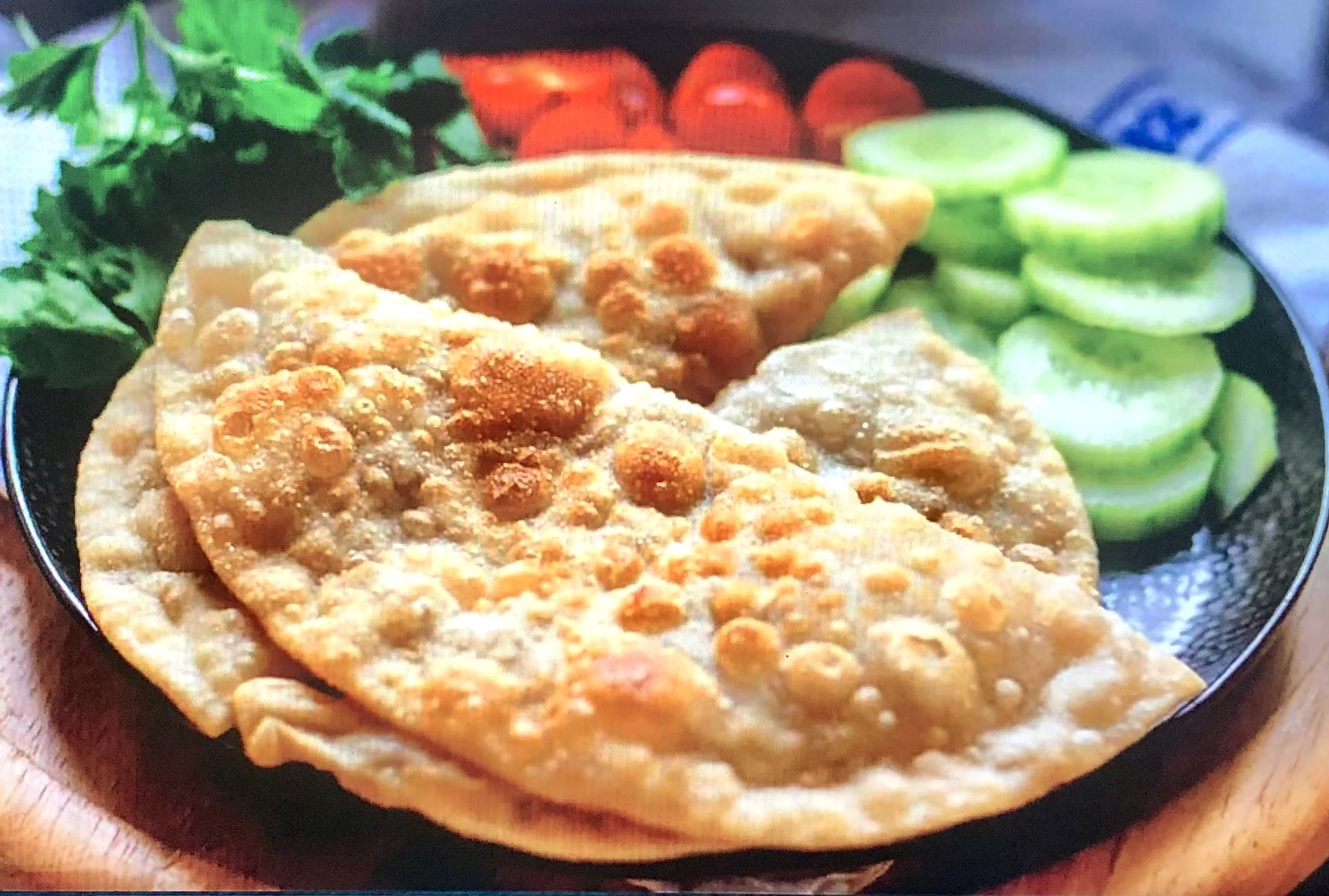
Example of serving Çiğ Börek

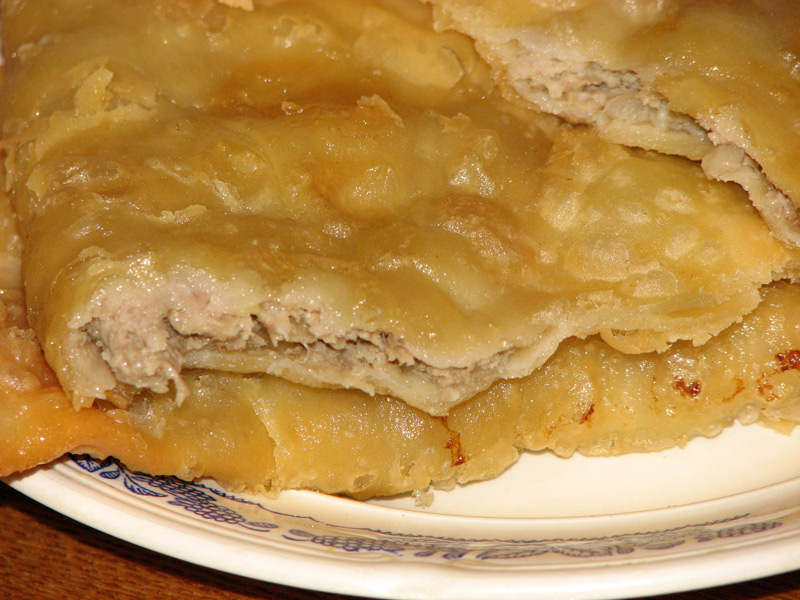
Chebureki, bit open

== See also ==
- List of stuffed dishes
- Cantiq
- Curry puff
- Empanada
- Fleischkuekle, a Black Sea German variant common to diaspora communities in The Dakotas
- Gözleme
- Haliva, a similar Circassian pastry
- Khuushuur, a similar kind of meat pastry in Mongolian cuisine
- Lángos
- Lörtsy, a similar kind of pastry in Finnish cuisine
- Pastel (food)
- Pasty
- Paste, a Mexican variation of the Cornish pasty
- Peremech
- Plăcintă
- Qutab, an Azerbaijani variant
- Sha phaley, a similar Tibetan pastry
