= Hubig's Pies =

Pie brand in Louisiana, United States

- Hubig's Pies mascot "Savory Simon"

Restaurant information
- Established: 1921
- Owner: Ramsey Family
- Food type: Fruit Pies
- Location: New Orleans, LA, United States
- Website: www.hubigs.com

Hubig's Pies, also sometimes called Hubig's New Orleans Style Pies, are a brand of fruit and sweet-filled fried pies that are produced by Hubig's Pies in New Orleans, Louisiana. The product was off the market from 2012 after a fire destroyed the factory, but the business was brought back in 2022.

== History ==
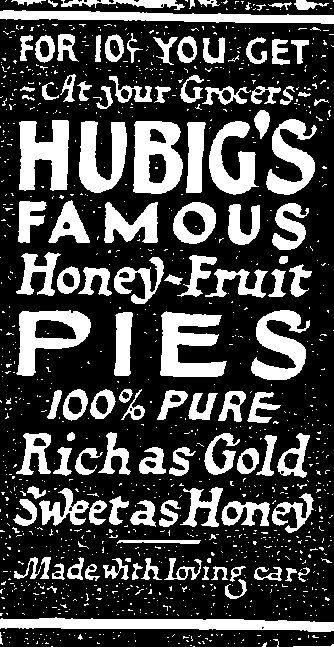
1922 New Orleans newspaper advertisement for "Hubig's Famous Honey-Fruit Pies".

Simon Hubig was born in Newport, KY, right across the river from Cincinnati where he opened the Simon Hubig Baking Company in 1890. It was said to have had the greatest output of all bakeries in the United States. He later closed the first business and founded the Simon Hubig Pie Company in Fort Worth, Texas in 1918. In subsequent years, the company expanded to several locations throughout the Southeastern United States and opened its New Orleans location in 1921. During the Great Depression, all of the locations were forced to close except the New Orleans bakery, which remained profitable. Throughout the life of the company, the New Orleans bakery stayed in the same Dauphine Street location in the Faubourg Marigny it was founded in.

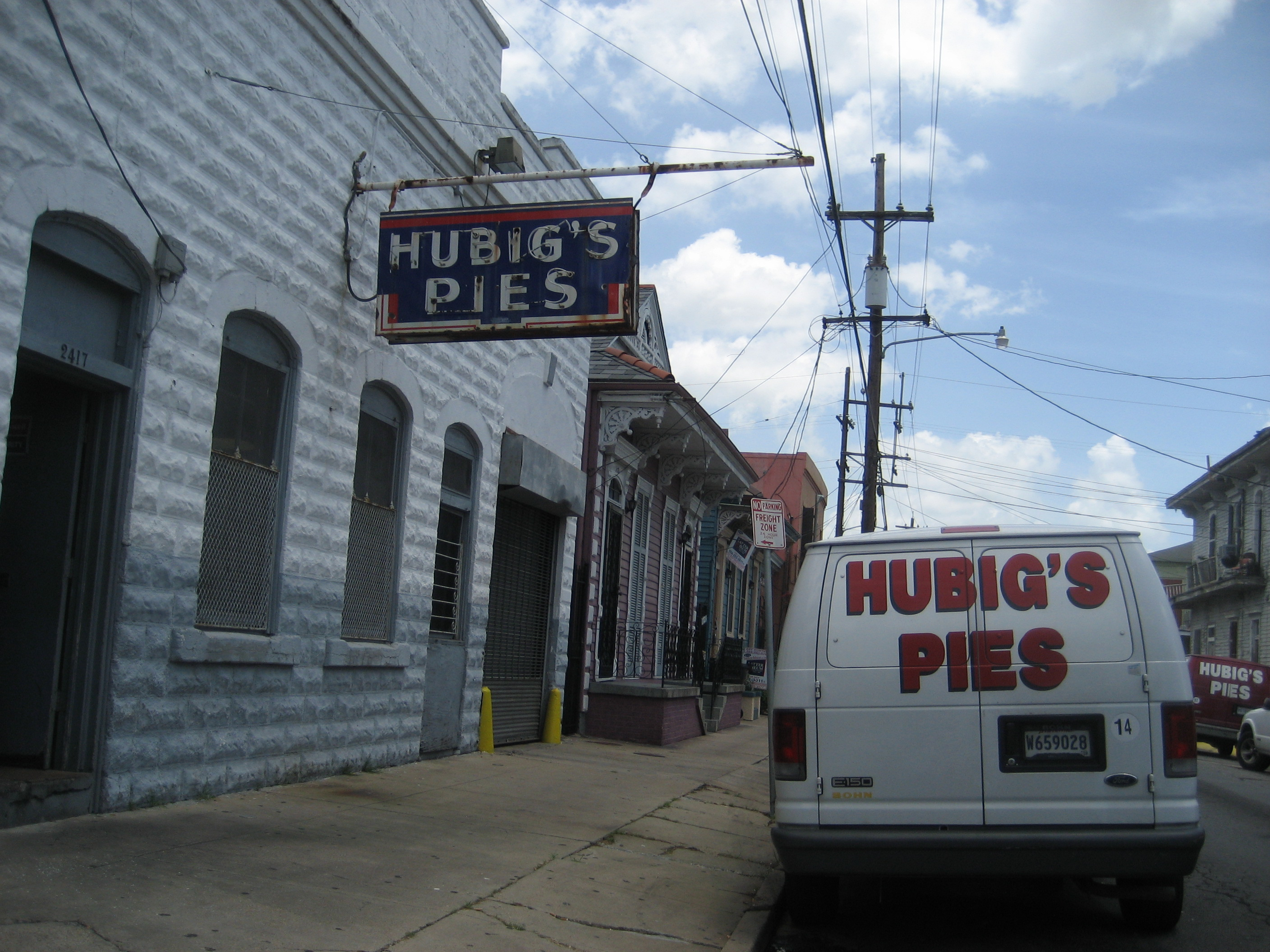
Old Hubig's Pies factory on Dauphine Street, 2008

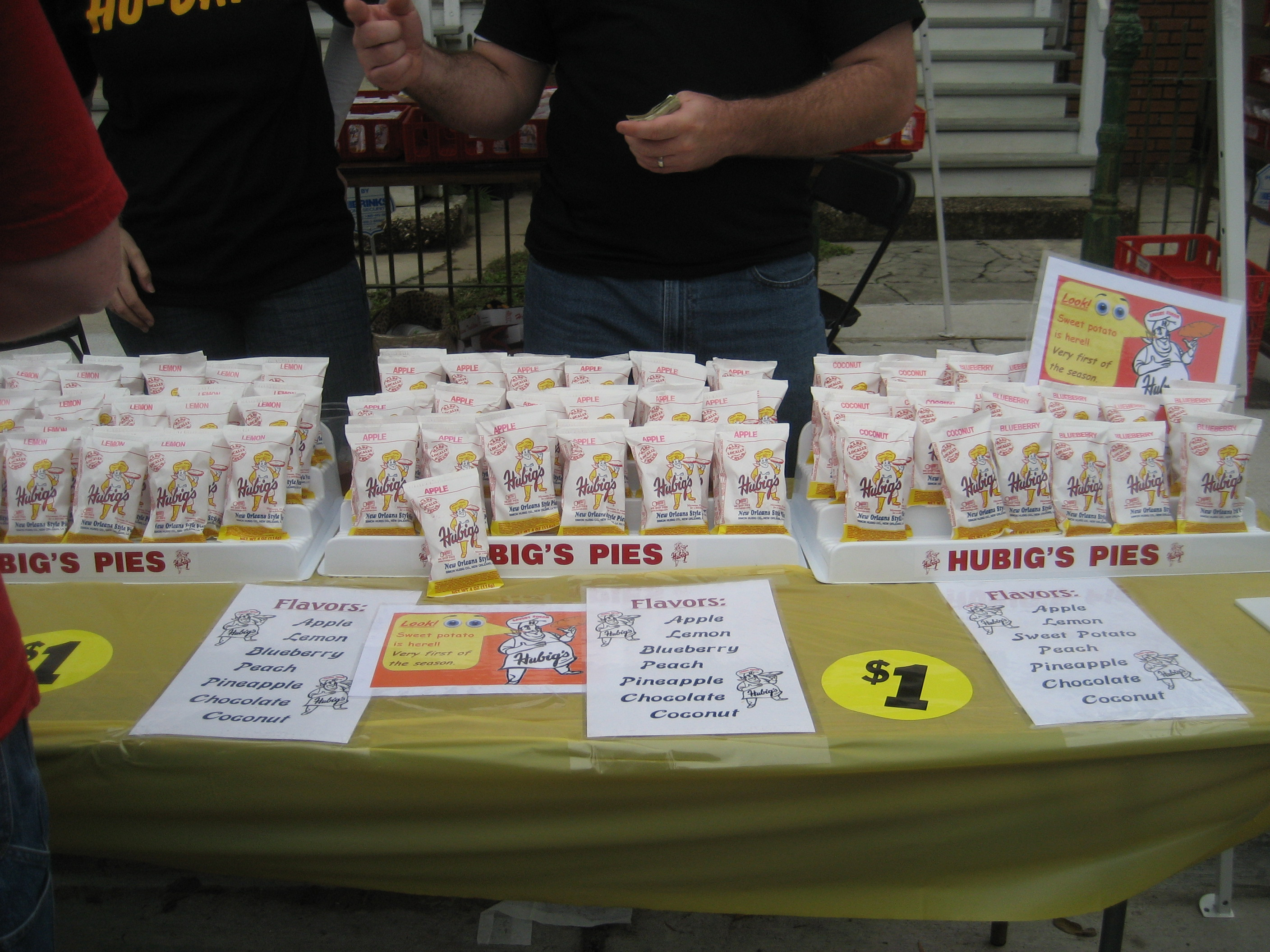
Hubig's Pies at Oak Street Po-Boy Festival, 2009

The production process changed very little over time. Before Hurricane Katrina, in addition to the famous turnover-style pie, Hubig's also made individual and family-sized pies. Hubig's Pies frequently donated fresh products to charitable organizations in the area. The Orleans Parish jail was traditionally one of the largest buyers of pies. The Hubig's bakery remains heavily reliant on laborers rather than automated processes.

When the city of New Orleans was struck by Hurricane Katrina in August 2005, the bakery's ventilation system, an exterior wall, and the roof were damaged. Production of Hubig's pies was halted and did not start again until more than four months later, January 4, 2006, after the neighborhood had clean water, reliable electricity, and sufficient gas pressure. Hubig's pies increased slightly in cost after the storm, and the variety of flavors offered changed. About 30,000 hand-sized pies were made a day to be delivered on the next day.

=== Fire and relocation ===
On July 27, 2012, a fire broke out at the bakery. Flames were seen coming from the front of the building at about 4:30 a.m. The fire grew to five alarms, engulfing the factory. A little more than an hour after the first firefighters arrived, the facade of the building crumbled. No one was hurt, but the facility was a total loss. Andrew Ramsey originally said he planned to rebuild and resume production as soon as possible, and in 2013, the city approved plans by Hubig's to build a factory in a new location. The efforts eventually stalled, however, before any construction work had started. In 2014, Ramsey stated that he could not "give [...] even a tentative date" for a return of Hubig's, because the company's owners were "not in concert about how to proceed". He added that while he himself would favor a re-opening, he had "no control over whether that happen[ed]."

In April 2015, the New Orleans City Planning Commission approved plans to construct residential buildings on the site of the former Hubig's Pies factory.

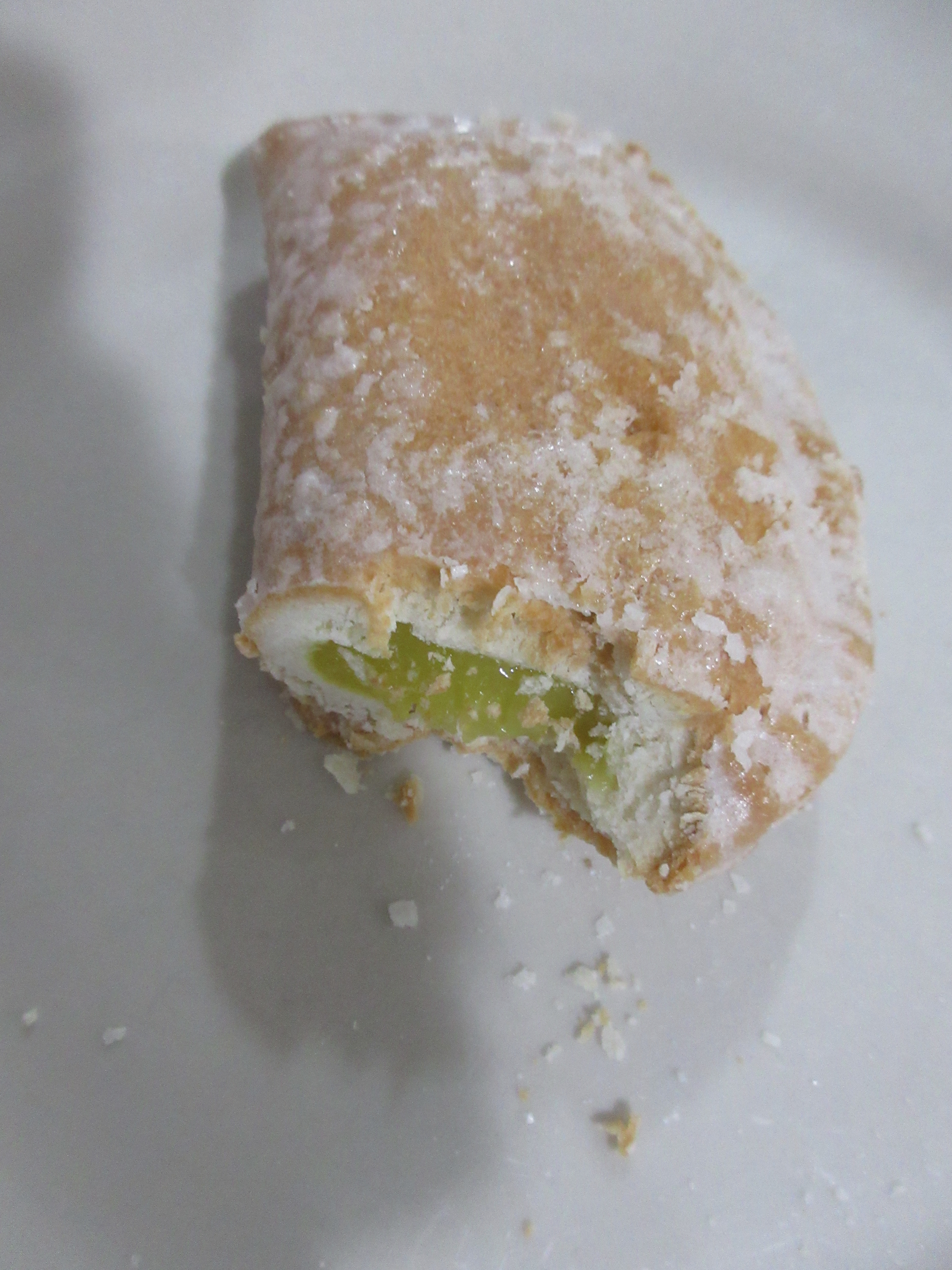
Lemon Hubig's Pie cut open, June 2023

On July 18, 2019, it was announced that production would resume in 2020 from a plant in Elmwood, Louisiana in Jefferson Parish. The company was expected to resume production in 2020.

In November 2022, the company announced it was hiring, and they officially returned later in the month.

== Mascot ==
Savory Simon is the mascot of Hubig's Pies, and he is prominently featured on the packaging and some advertising for their pies.
