= Station Park, Forfar =

Football stadium in Forfar, Scotland

Station Park
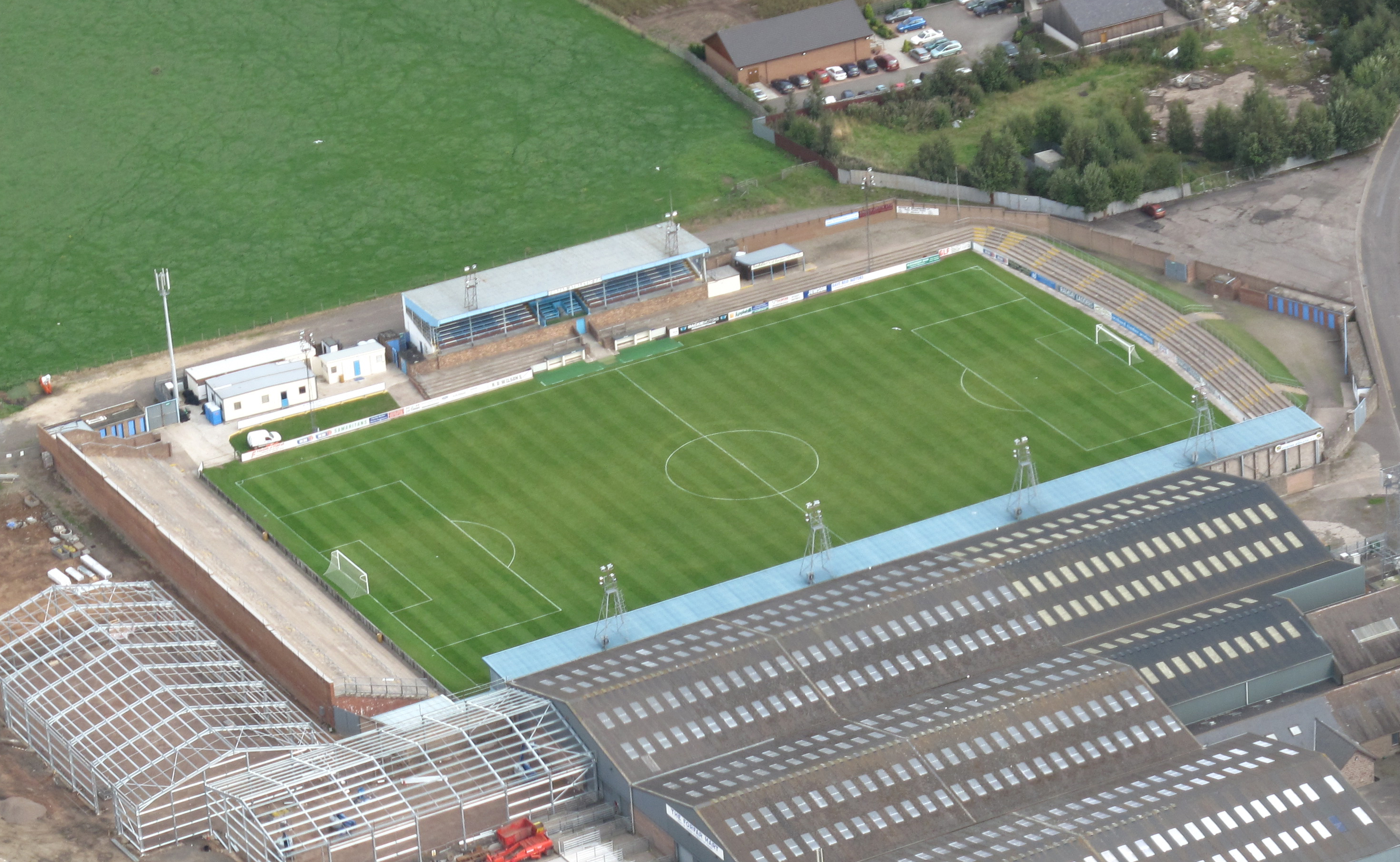

- Location in Angus
- Location: Forfar, Scotland
- Coordinates: 56°39′08″N 2°53′06″W
- Owner: Forfar Athletic F.C.
- Capacity: 6,777 (739 seated)
- Surface: 3G artificial turf
- Record attendance: 10,780

Construction
- Opened: 1888

Tenants
- Forfar Athletic F.C. (1885–present); Forfar Farmington F.C. (2012–present)

Station Park is a football ground in Forfar, Angus, Scotland. It is home to Scottish Professional Football League side Forfar Athletic and to Forfar Farmington of the Scottish Women's Premier League.

Station Park is one of a number of old-fashioned football grounds left in the Scottish League. It has a capacity of 6,777 although this has previously been much higher. The record crowd is 10,780 against Rangers in 1970. The total has been reduced for safety reasons.

The ground allows access to all four sides of the pitch. There is one large terrace behind the goal at the western end of the ground. Called the "mert end" because a cattle market is just over the wall this area is reserved for visiting supporters when occasion and numbers demand separation of fans. A seated grandstand, opened in 1959, is on the north side of the pitch. There is a covered terrace on the south side of the ground and further, uncovered, terracing to the east and in front of the stand and the main catering concession. Catering at the ground includes the local speciality, Forfar bridies and the more usual pie. There are plans to rebuild the main stand in a more modern style with improved facilities.

The ground, as the name suggests, was once close to the town's railway station, situated on the Caledonian Railway's main line from Aberdeen to Glasgow and London, but this station was closed in 1968 as part of the Beeching cuts. Station Park is now one of the furthest Scottish League grounds from a railway station (Peterhead's Balmoor ground is further). The nearest train stations to Forfar are Dundee and Arbroath, both of which are approximately 14 miles (23 km) away. As a result, Station Park is best reached by road.
