= Garlic chive flower sauce =

Condiment in Chinese cuisine

- Type: Dip
- Place of origin: China
- Region or state: Shaanxi province
- Main ingredients: Garlic chive flower

Garlic chive flower sauce (Chinese: 韭花酱; pinyin: jiǔhuā jiàng) is a condiment made by fermenting flowers of Allium tuberosum. It is used in Chinese cuisine (especially in Northwest China) as a dip for its fragrant, savory and salty attributes. The flower has a mild garlic flavor and aroma.

== History ==
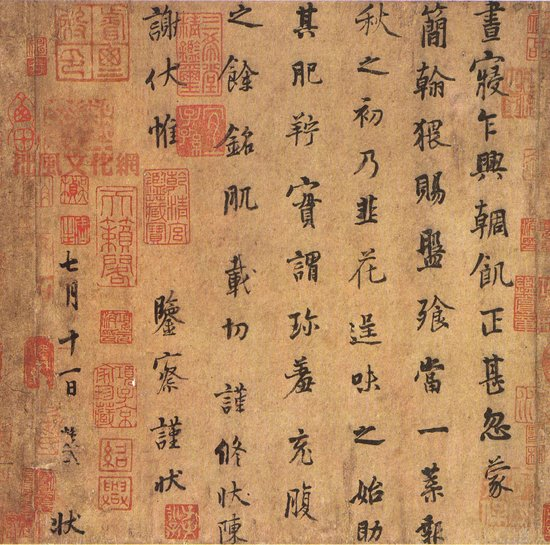
Jiu Hua Tie

The condiment originated in China, where the plant was first cultivated for culinary purposes in the Zhou Dynasty. The usage of garlic chives' flowers in a dipping sauce for mutton dates from the 8th or 9th century CE. In the Jiu Hua Tie, the fifth most important piece of Chinese calligraphy in semi-cursive script, Yang Ningshi (873–954) recorded using garlic chive flowers to enhance the flavors of mutton:

当一叶报秋之初，乃韭花逞味之始，助其肥羜，实谓珍羞，充腹之馀，铭肌载切

— 杨凝式, 韭花帖

At the start of autumn, the chive flowers begin to become flavorful and can be used to enhance lamb flavors. This is a true delicacy that, apart from satiating hunger, gave a memorable experience.

A similar usage is described in written records from the later Qing Period.

The contemporary Chinese writer Wang Zengqi has described and commented on the custom of making garlic chive flower sauce in northern Chinese households, asserting that it originated in Northwest China. He has analyzed the Jiu Hua Tie from the perspective of a fellow writer and epicure; discussing the usage of the flower, he wrote:

It is the first time, and perhaps the only time, that garlic chive flowers made their presence in calligraphy. This piece, named after the flower, has characters intact and is as comprehensible as contemporary language, invoking a sense of familiarity. Though not encyclopedically knowledgeable, I have never seen the flower appear in literature, which is unfair for a delicacy so prevalent yet flavorful. [...]

Record is not given on how the garlic chives flowers are processed. But it appears that it is accompanied by mutton. [The piece mentioned the sentence] "助其肥羜", in which "羜" is five-month-old lamb, which is not necessarily what Yang had actually eaten, but more likely an allusion from the "既有肥羜" verse in Lumbering, Xiao Ya, Shi Jing. Beijingers cannot part from garlic chive flower sauce when eating instant-cooked mutton, a tradition [I] previously thought to have originated from Mongol or Western minorities, but it appears that it already existed during the Wudai period. Yang Ningshi lived in Shaanxi, and serving garlic chive flowers alongside mutton is a tradition that started near there also.

Garlic chive flowers in Beijing are ground and pickled when eaten, and are somewhat juicy in texture. It is good both as dipping for mutton and as a pickle alone.

— Wang Zengqi, 文人与食事：多年父子成兄弟, Chive Flowers

== Preparation ==
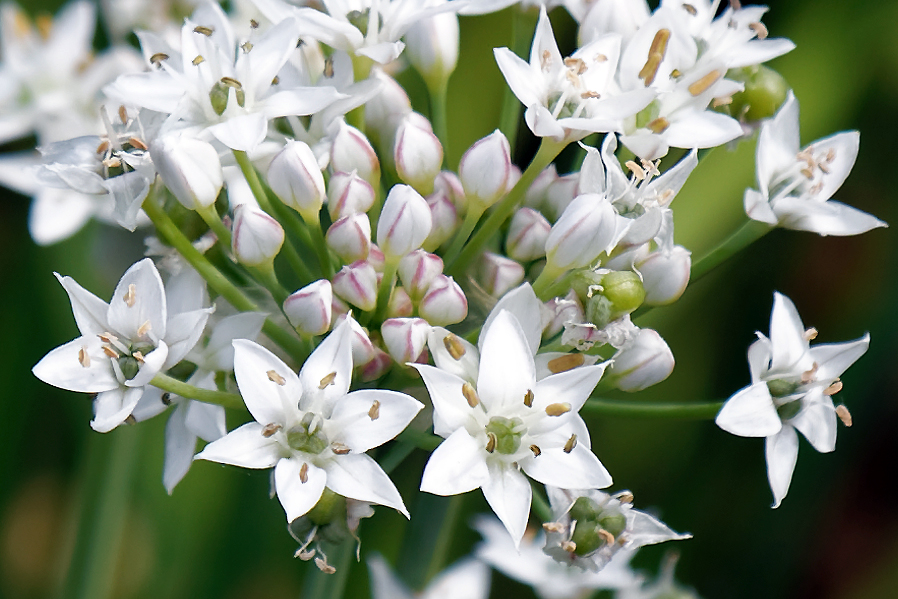
Garlic chive flowers

The condiment is made by fermenting ground flowers of garlic chives in salt, sesame oil, and spices including Sichuan pepper, ginger, and garlic. After it is made, it can be stored for up to a year. Different regions may vary in preference on production methods and the inclusion or exclusion of certain spices, but pickling a combination of predominant chive flowers and supplementary spices is common.

== Culinary uses ==
The condiment can be used as a dipping sauce for boiled mutton and can also be a composite material for the dipping sauce of Chinese hot pot. It is used in small quantities and usually mixed with sesame paste or rice vinegar (among others) to avoid an overwhelmingly salty taste.
