= Jiucai hezi =

Type of Chinese savory pocket pie

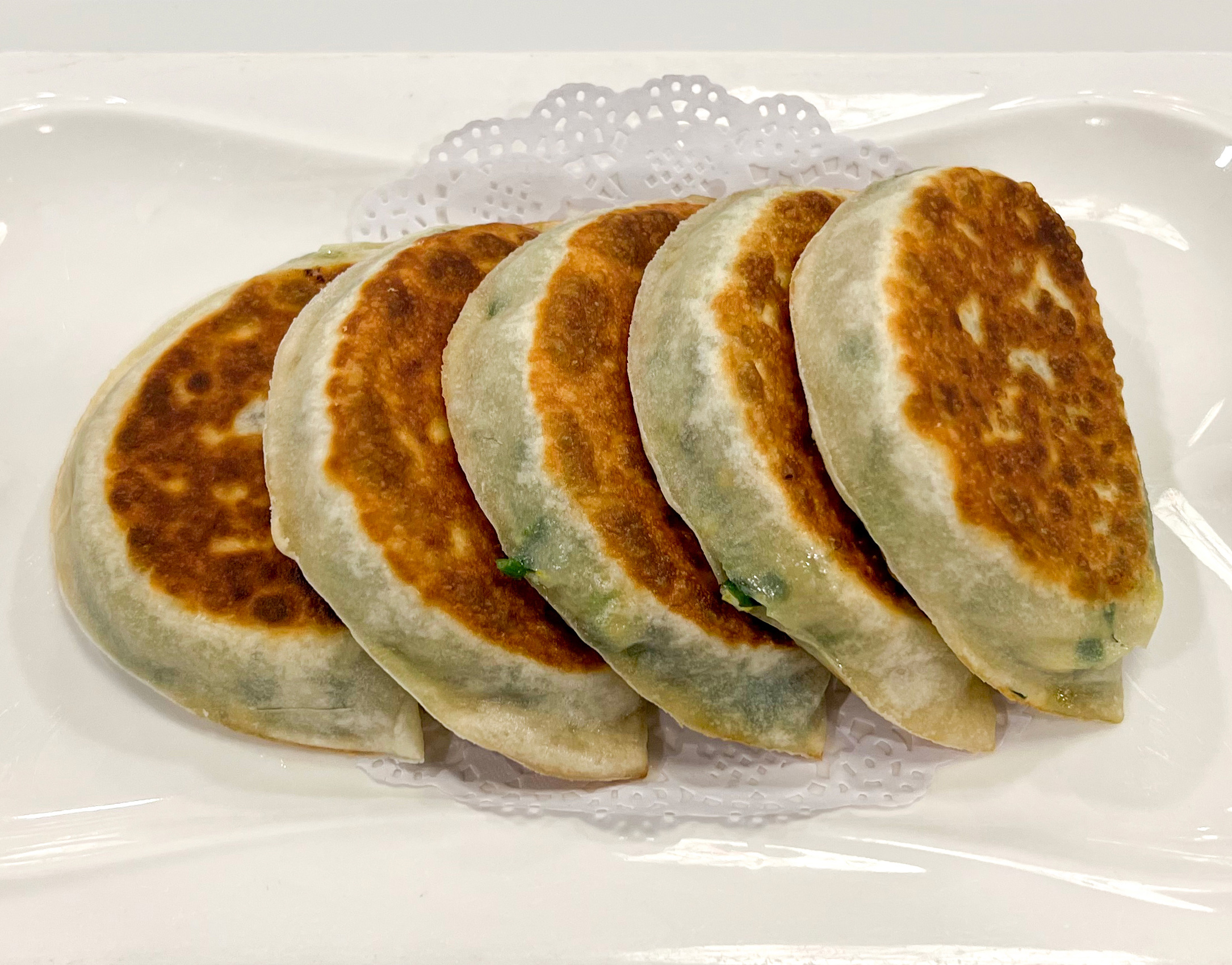
- Pan-fried jiucai hezi at a restaurant in Chongwenmen
- Place of origin: China
- Region or state: Shandong
- Main ingredients: Garlic chives, egg, glass noodles, wheat flour

Jiucai hezi
- Traditional Chinese: 韭菜盒子
- Simplified Chinese: 韭菜合子
- Literal meaning: chive box
Transcriptions
Standard Mandarin
- Hanyu Pinyin: jiǔcài hézi

Jiucai hezi (Chinese: 韭菜盒子 "chive box"), also called chive pockets, are a type of savory pie originating from Shandong, China. They are made of garlic chives and eggs in a flour wrapper, then pan fried or baked. Jiucai hezi are traditionally eaten to celebrate the Chinese New Year.

== Description ==
The dough is made from flour and water, with leavened and unleavened varieties. The stuffing typically includes chopped garlic chives, scrambled eggs, sauteed mini-shrimp and glass noodles. Mushrooms and wood ear fungus are sometimes included. There is also a variety with minced meat as stuffing. The stuffing will be put in the middle of a flat dough, and then folded into half-moon shape. The finished turnover is usually pan-fried instead of baked in the oven like a turnover, and is served with black rice vinegar and sesame oil mixture as dip.

== Gallery ==
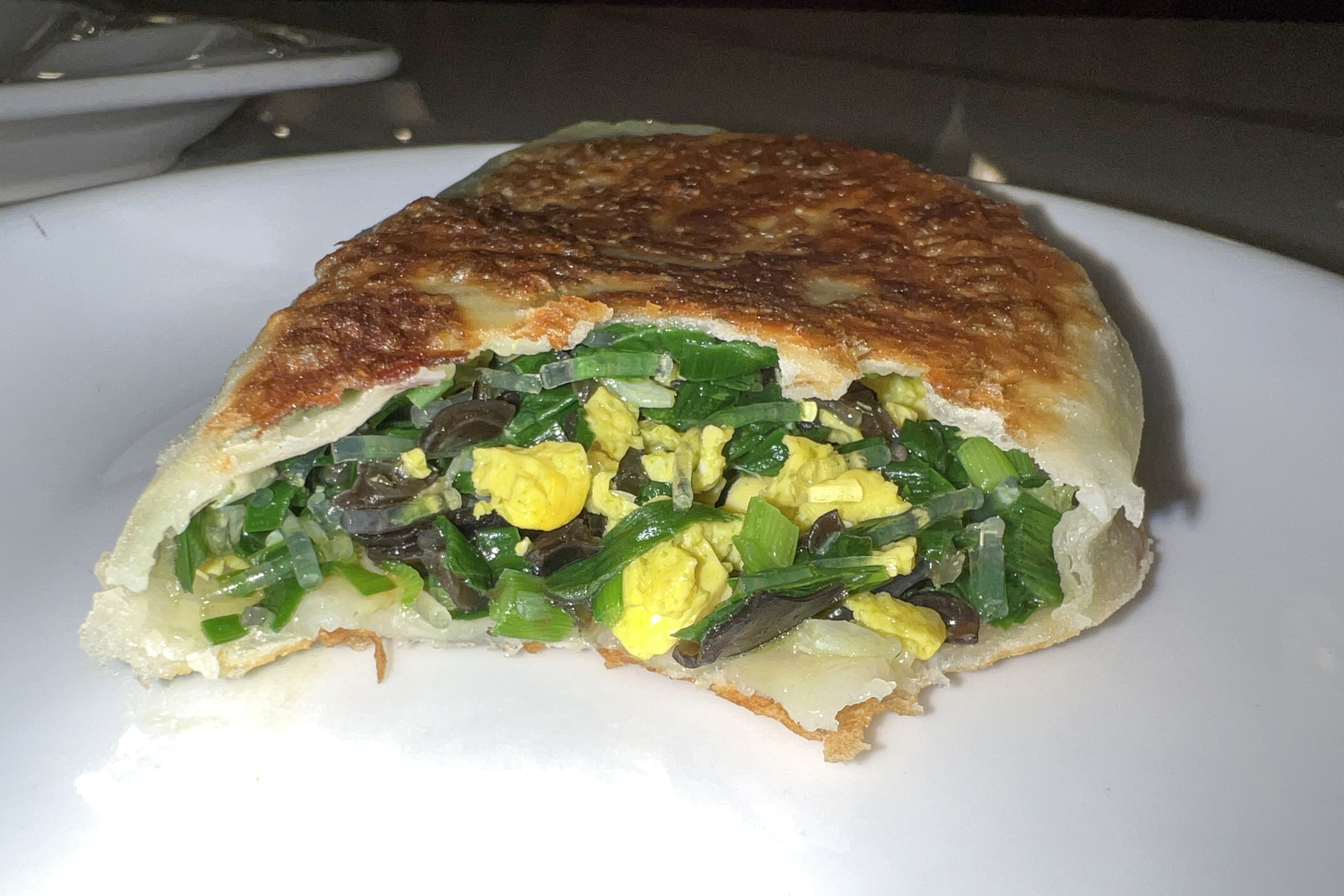
Stuffing inside

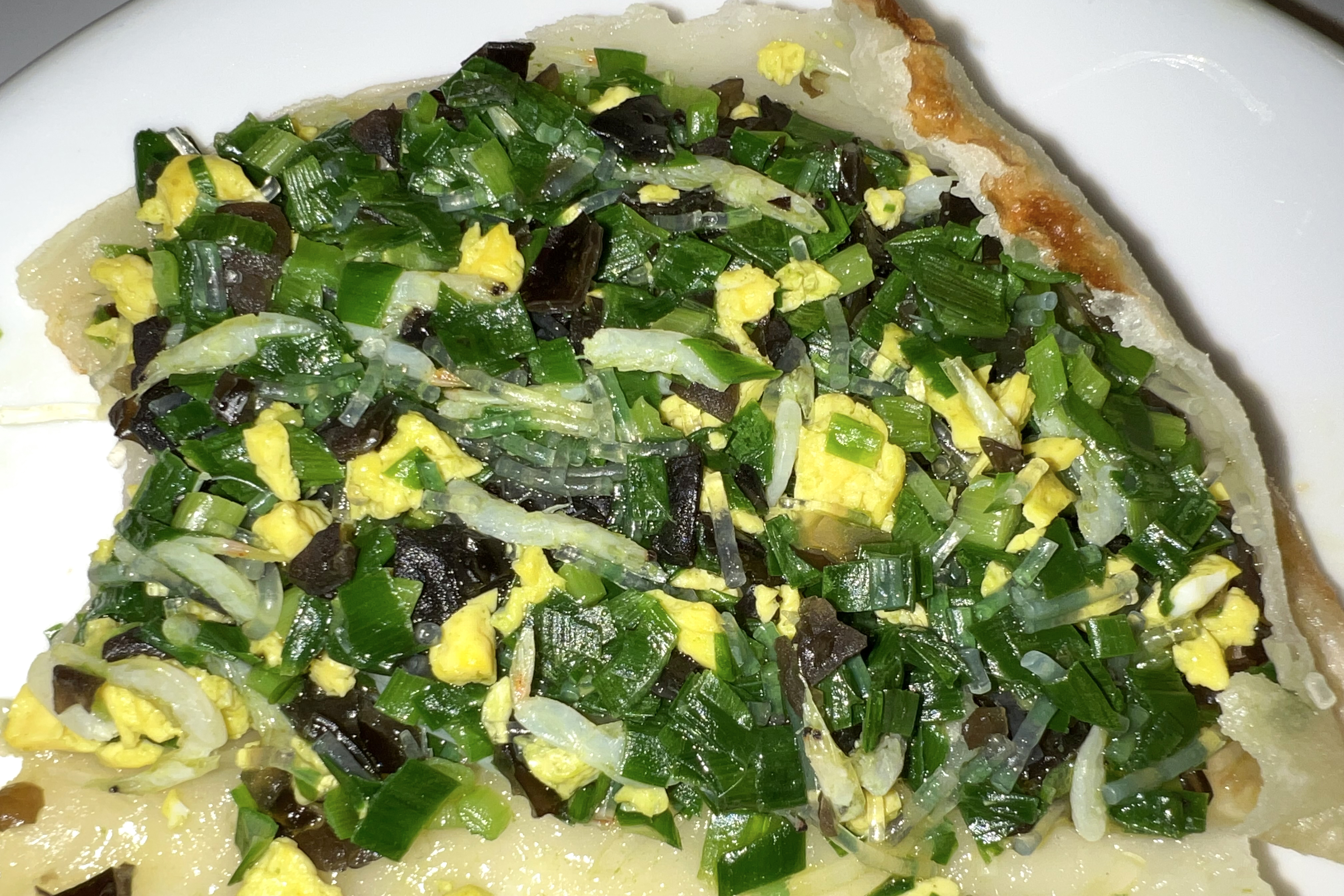

== In popular culture ==
On February 14, 2022, during the second qualifying round of the freestyle skiing women's slopestyle event at the 2022 Winter Olympics, skier Eileen Gu was seen munching on a Chinese chive pocket (jiǔcài hézi) from a plastic bag while awaiting her score. In a later interview, Gu confirmed that the pastry was indeed a chive pocket. The moment went viral across China. According to Meituan data, online searches for "jiucai hezi" surged by over 161% in the week following Gu's mention, with takeaway orders exceeding 1.6 million — a 93% year-on-year increase. Furthermore, China Food Press reported that the post-Olympics surge in chive pocket sales reflected this viral trend, with searches and orders spiking noticeably.

== See also ==
- Cheburek
