= Fried pie =

Type of dessert pie

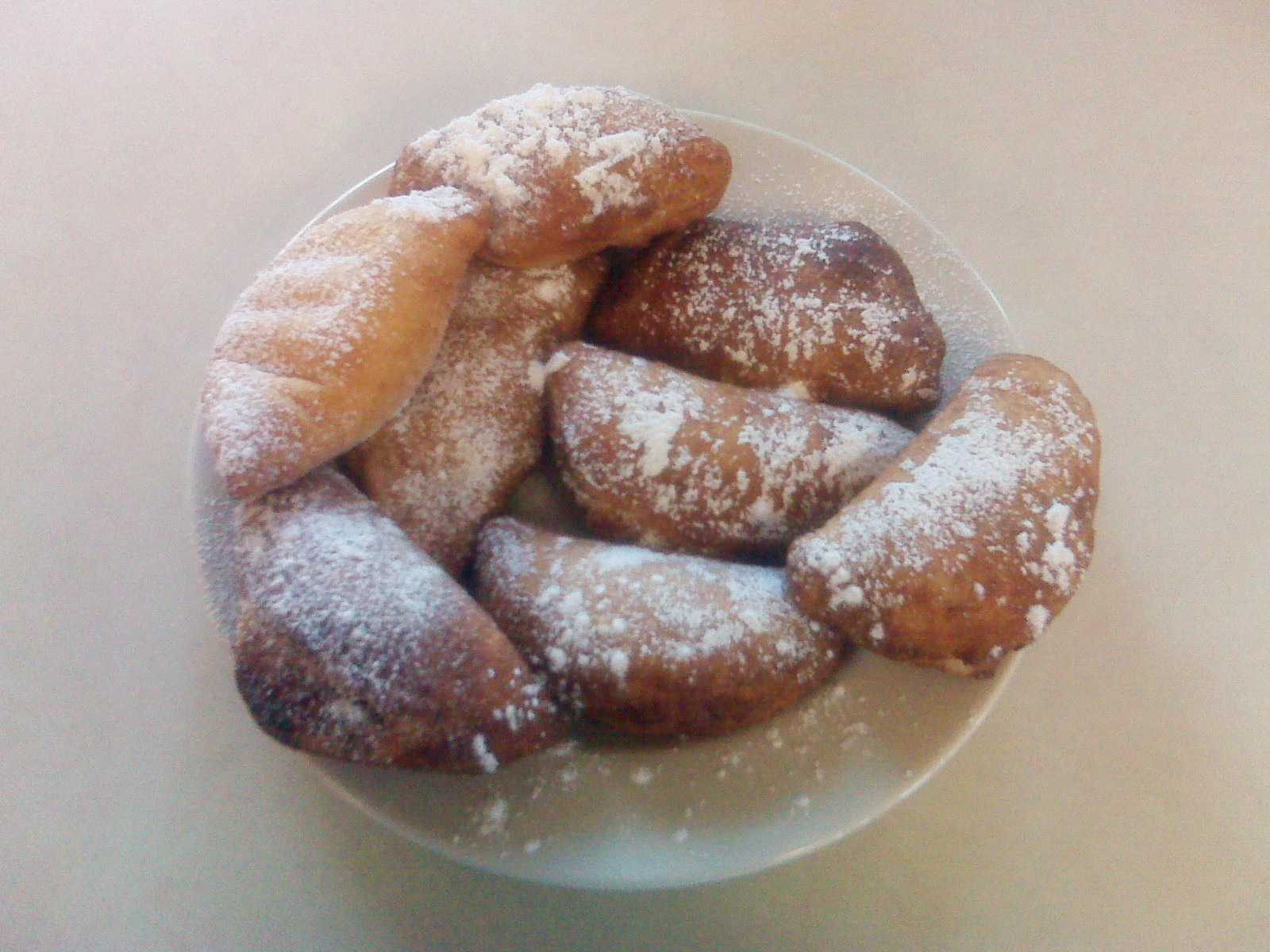
- Fried apple pies
- Alternative names: Fry pie
- Type: Pie or turnover
- Course: Dessert
- Place of origin: United States
- Region or state: American South
- Main ingredients: Fruit, dough

Fried pies, also known as fry pies, are mainly dessert pies that are a type of turnovers, that are fried. The fruit filling is wrapped in the dough, similar to the dough of a pie crust.

== History ==
Historically in the American South, fried pies were known as "Crab Lanterns", a term that dates back to at least 1770, and may originate from crab apple pies that had slits for ventilation, thus resembling a lantern.

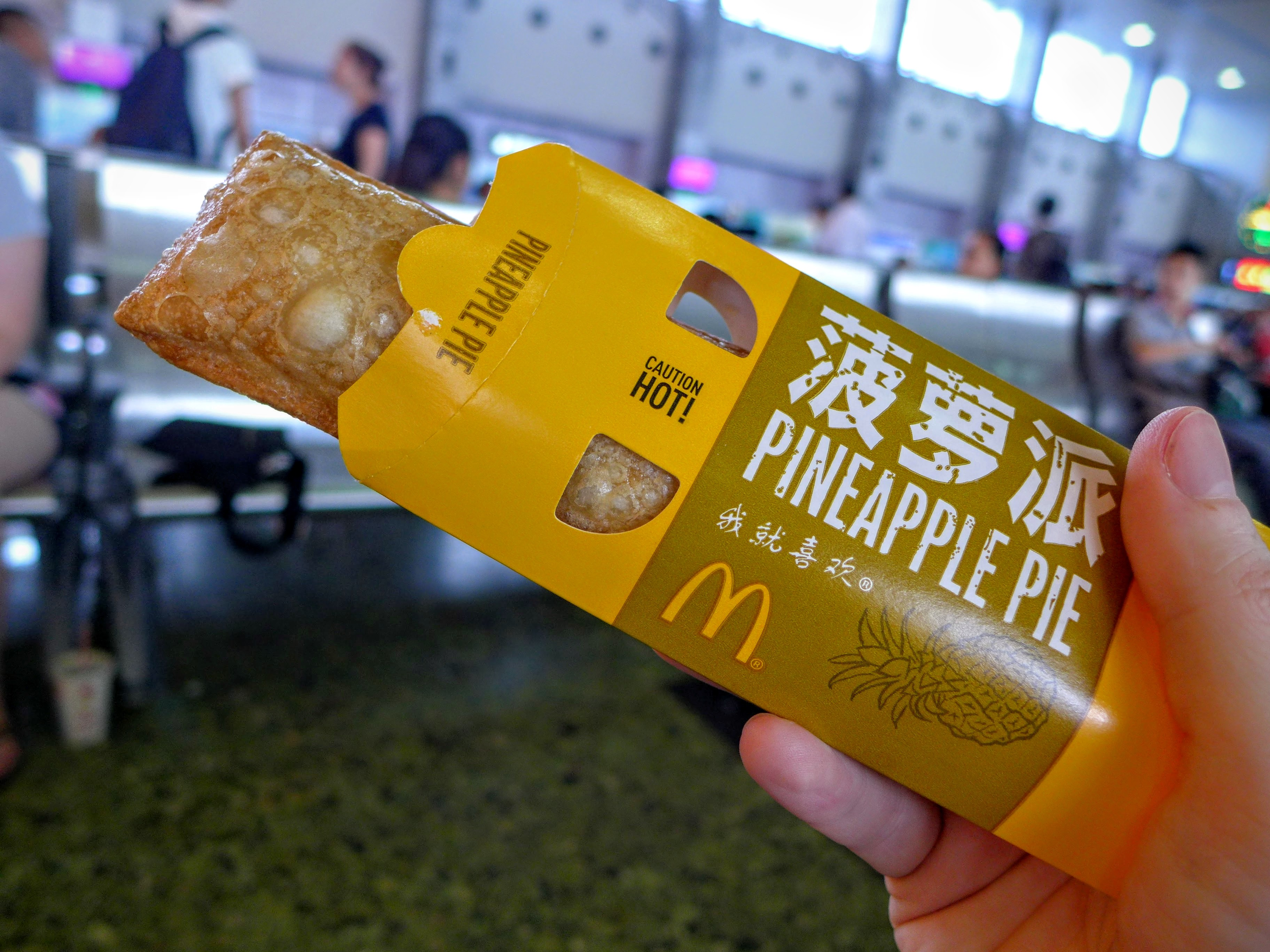
A McDonald's fried pineapple pie, July 2013 in Chengdu, China.

McDonald's introduced apple pies to their menu in 1968. In 1992 they were phased out in the United States citing health concerns, in favor of a baked pie.

New Orleans' company Hubig's has produced fried pies since 1922. Originally a southeastern chain that originated in Texas, its New Orleans bakery was the only of its locations to survive the Great Depression.

== See also ==
- Doughnut
- Empanada
- Fritter
