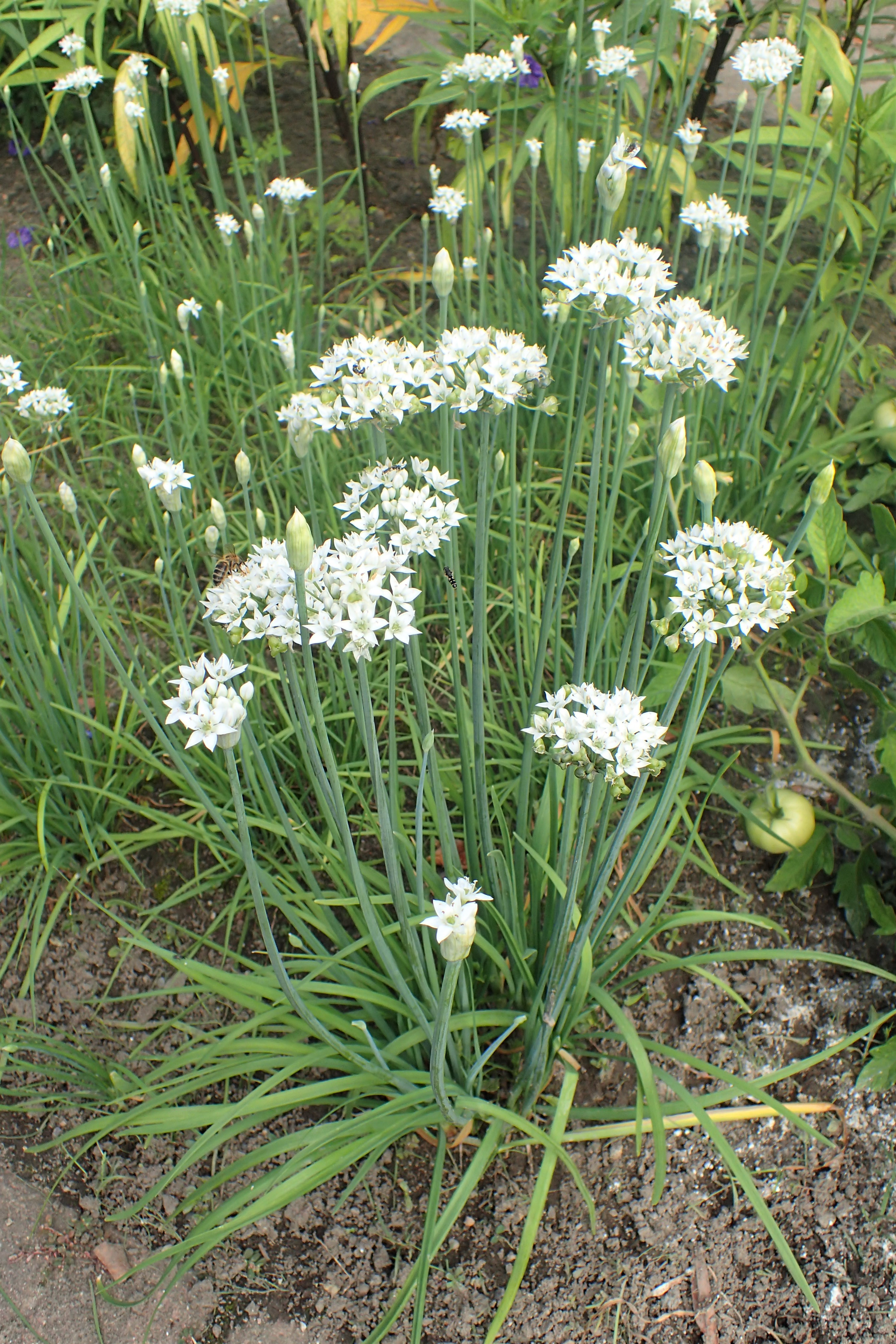
- Flowering garlic chives
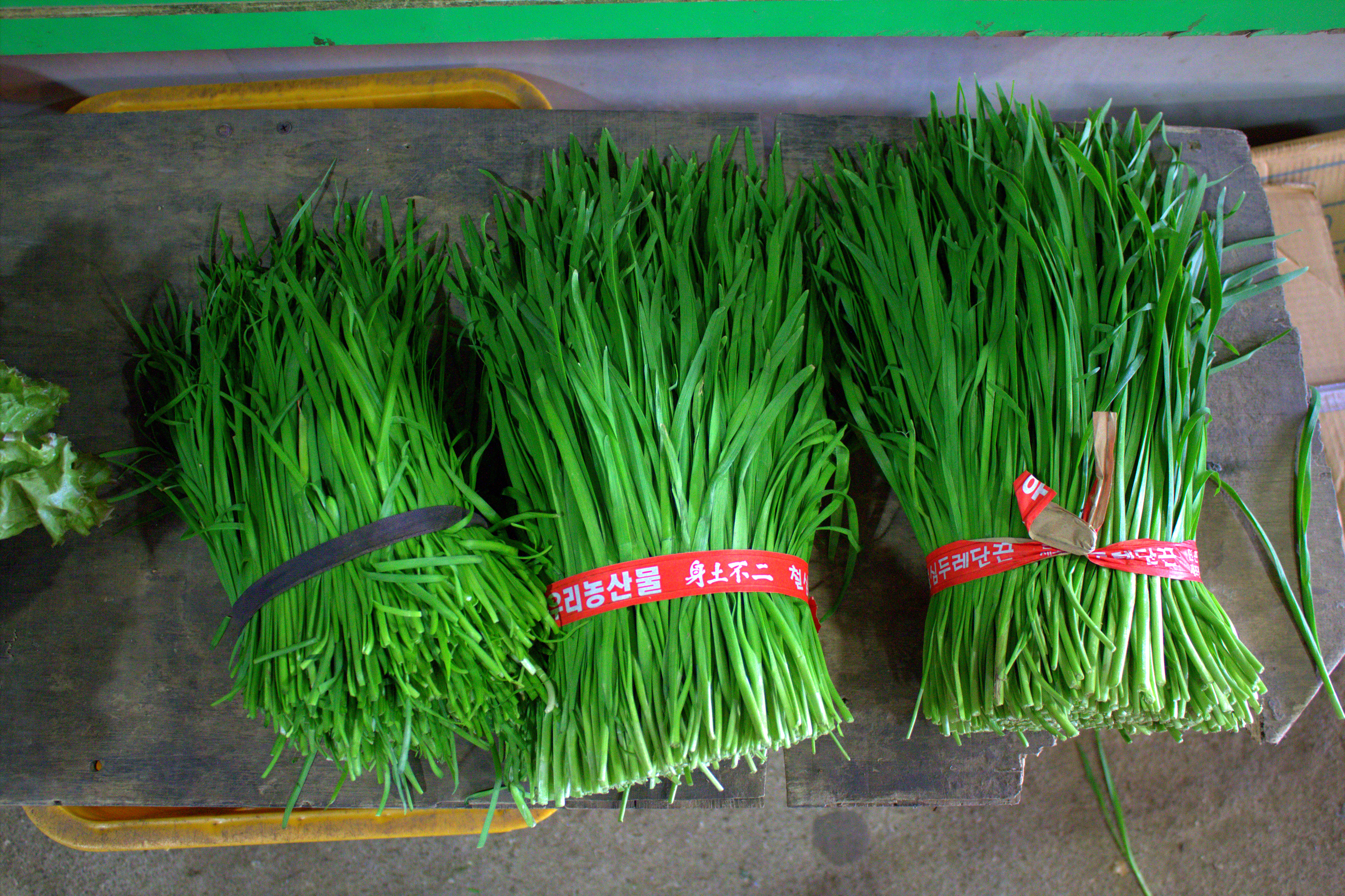
- Allium tuberosum from a store

Scientific classification
- Kingdom: Plantae
- Clade: Tracheophytes
- Clade: Angiosperms
- Clade: Monocots
- Order: Asparagales
- Family: Amaryllidaceae
- Subfamily: Allioideae
- Genus: Allium
- Subgenus: A. subg. Butomissa
- Species: A. tuberosum

Binomial name
- Allium tuberosum Rottler ex Spreng. 1825 not Roxb. 1832

Synonyms
- Synonymy: Allium angulosum Lour. 1790, illegitimate homonym not L. 1753; Allium argyi H.Lév.; Allium chinense Maxim 1859, illegitimate homonym not G.Don 1827; Allium clarkei Hook.f.; Allium roxburghii Kunth; Allium sulvia Buch.-Ham. ex D.Don; Allium tricoccum auct. non Blanco; Allium tuberosum Roxb. 1832, illegitimate homonym not Rottler ex Spreng. 1825; Allium tuberosum f. yezoense (Nakai) M.Hiroe; Allium uliginosum G.Don; Allium yesoense Nakai; Allium yezoense Nakai; Nothoscordum sulvia (Buch.-Ham. ex D.Don) Kunth

= Allium tuberosum =

Species of onion native to Shanxi, China

Allium tuberosum (garlic chives, Oriental garlic, Asian chives, Chinese chives, Chinese leek) is a species of plant native to the Chinese province of Shanxi, and cultivated and naturalized elsewhere in Asia and around the world. It has a number of uses in Asian cuisine.

== Description ==
Allium tuberosum is a rhizomatous, clump-forming perennial plant growing from a small, elongated bulb (about 10 mm; 13/32 inch, across) that is tough and fibrous. Unlike either onion or garlic, it has strap-shaped leaves with triangular bases, about 1.5 to 8 mm (1/16 to 5/16 in) wide. It produces many white flowers in a round cluster (umbel) on stalks 25 to 60 cm (10 to 24 in) tall. It grows in slowly expanding perennial clumps, but also readily sprouts from seed. In warmer areas (USDA zone 8 and warmer), garlic chives may remain green all year round. In cold areas (USDA zones 7 to 4b), leaves and stalks completely die back to the ground, and resprout from roots or rhizomes in the spring.

The flavor is more like garlic than chives.

== Taxonomy ==
Originally described by Johan Peter Rottler, the species name was validly published by Curt Polycarp Joachim Sprengel in 1825. A. tuberosum is classified within Allium in subgenus Butomissa (Salisb.) N. Friesen, section Butomissa (Salisb.) Kamelin, a group consisting of only A. tuberosum and A. ramosum L., which have been variously regarded as either one or two genetic entities.

== Distribution and habitat ==
Allium tuberosum originated in the Siberian–Mongolian–North Chinese steppes, but is widely cultivated and naturalised. It has been reported as growing wild in scattered locations in the United States (Illinois, Michigan, Ohio, Nebraska, Alabama, Iowa, Arkansas, and Wisconsin). However, it is believed to be more widespread in North America because of the availability of seeds and seedlings of this species as an exotic herb and because of its aggressiveness. This species is also widespread across much of mainland Europe and invasive in other areas of the world.

== Ecology ==
A late summer- to autumn-blooming plant, A. tuberosum is one of several Allium species known as wild onion and/or wild garlic that, in various parts of the world, such as Australia, are listed as noxious weeds or as invasive "serious high impact environmental and/or agricultural weeds that spread rapidly and often create monocultures".

== Cultivation ==
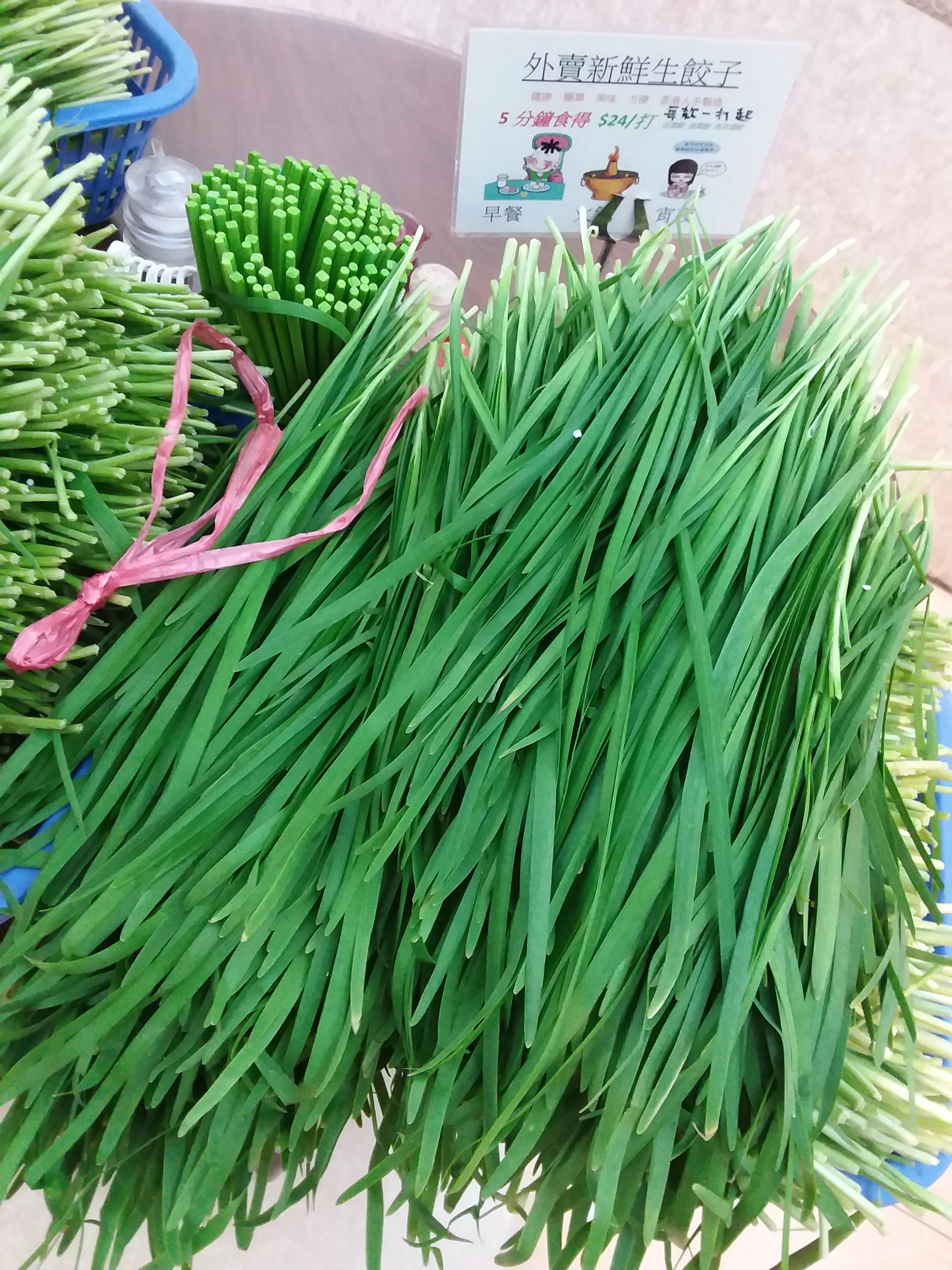
Garlic chives being sold in Hong Kong

Often grown as an ornamental plant in gardens, several cultivars are available. A. tuberosum is distinctive by blooming later than most native or naturalised species of Allium. It is cold-hardy to USDA zones 4–10 (−30 to +35 °F; −34 to 2 °C). Garlic chives are regarded as easy to grow in many conditions and may spread readily by seeds or can be intentionally propagated by dividing their clumps.

A number of varieties have been developed for either improved leaf (e.g. 'Shiva') or flower stem (e.g. 'Nien Hua') production. While the emphasis in Asia has been primarily culinary, in North America, the interest has been more as an ornamental. 'Monstrosum' is a giant ornamental cultivar.

== Uses ==
Garlic chives
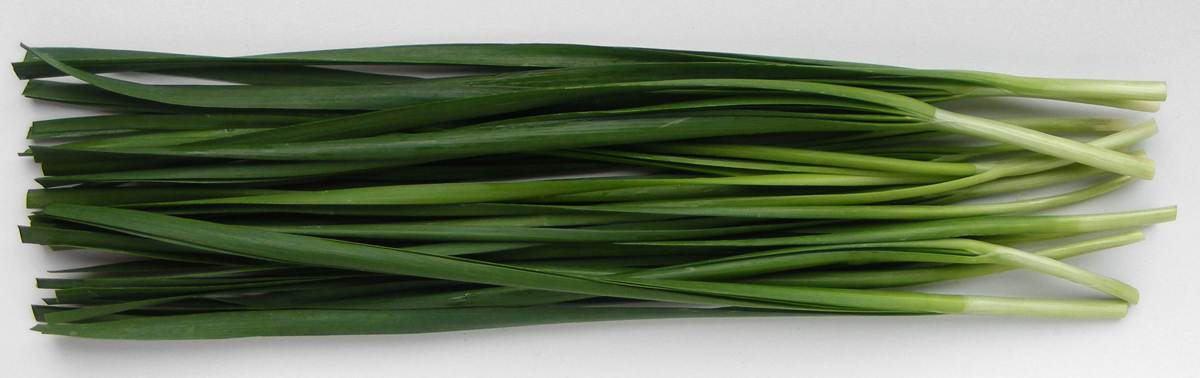

Chinese name
- Chinese: 韭菜
- Hanyu Pinyin: jiǔ cài
- Wade–Giles: chiu^{3} ts'ai^{4}
- Romanization: kíu chhoi
- Yale Romanization: gáu choi
- Jyutping: gau^{2} coi^{3}
- Hokkien POJ: kú chhài
- Tâi-lô: kú tshài

Dunganese name
- Dungan: джуцей

Vietnamese name
- Vietnamese: hẹ
- Chữ Nôm: 𦵠

Thai name
- Thai: กุยช่าย
- RTGS: kuichai

Korean name
- Hangul: 부추
- Revised Romanization: buchu
- McCune–Reischauer: puch'u

Japanese name
- Kanji: 韮
- Kana: にら/ニラ
- Revised Hepburn: nira

Kyrgyz name
- Kyrgyz: жусай

Uses include as ornamental plants, including cut and dried flowers, and as a culinary herb. Garlic chives have been widely cultivated for centuries in East Asia for their culinary value. The flat leaves, the stalks, and immature, unopened flower buds are used as flavouring. Another form is "blanched" by regrowing after cutting under cover to produce white-yellow leaves and a subtler flavor.

=== China ===
The leaves are used as a flavoring in a similar way to chives or scallions, and as a stir fry ingredient. They are often used in dumplings with eggs, shrimp, and/or pork. A Chinese flatbread similar to the scallion pancake may be made with garlic chives instead of scallions. Garlic chives are also one of the main ingredients used with yi mein dishes. Its flowers are fermented to make garlic chive flower sauce (韭花酱).

When the leaves of garlic chives are blanched by growing them in dark environments these are called jiǔhuáng (韭黄) or jiǔ cài huáng (韭菜黄), known in English as yellow garlic chives. These are considered a delicacy and are used in various stir fry dishes.

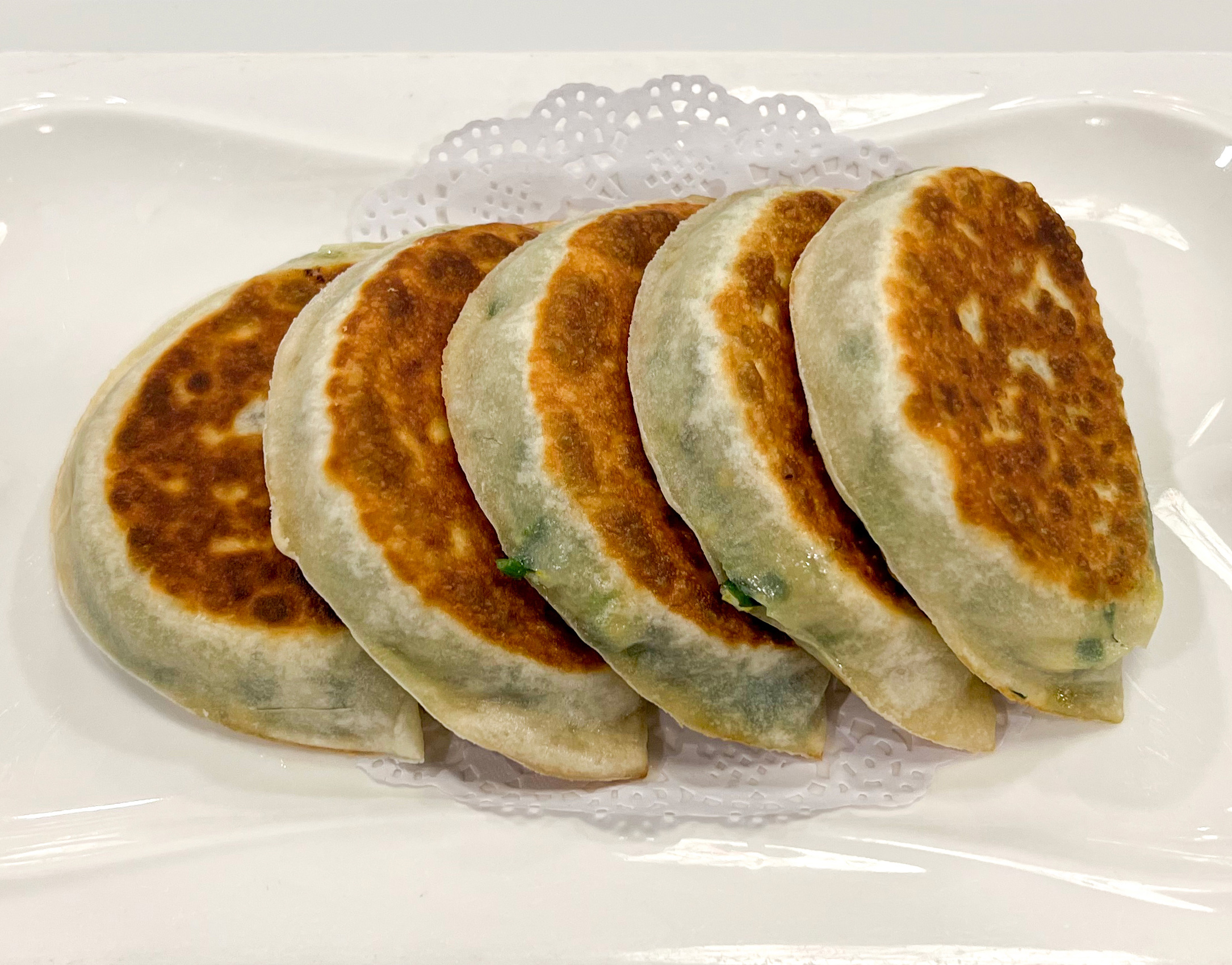
Jiucai hezi, or chive pockets

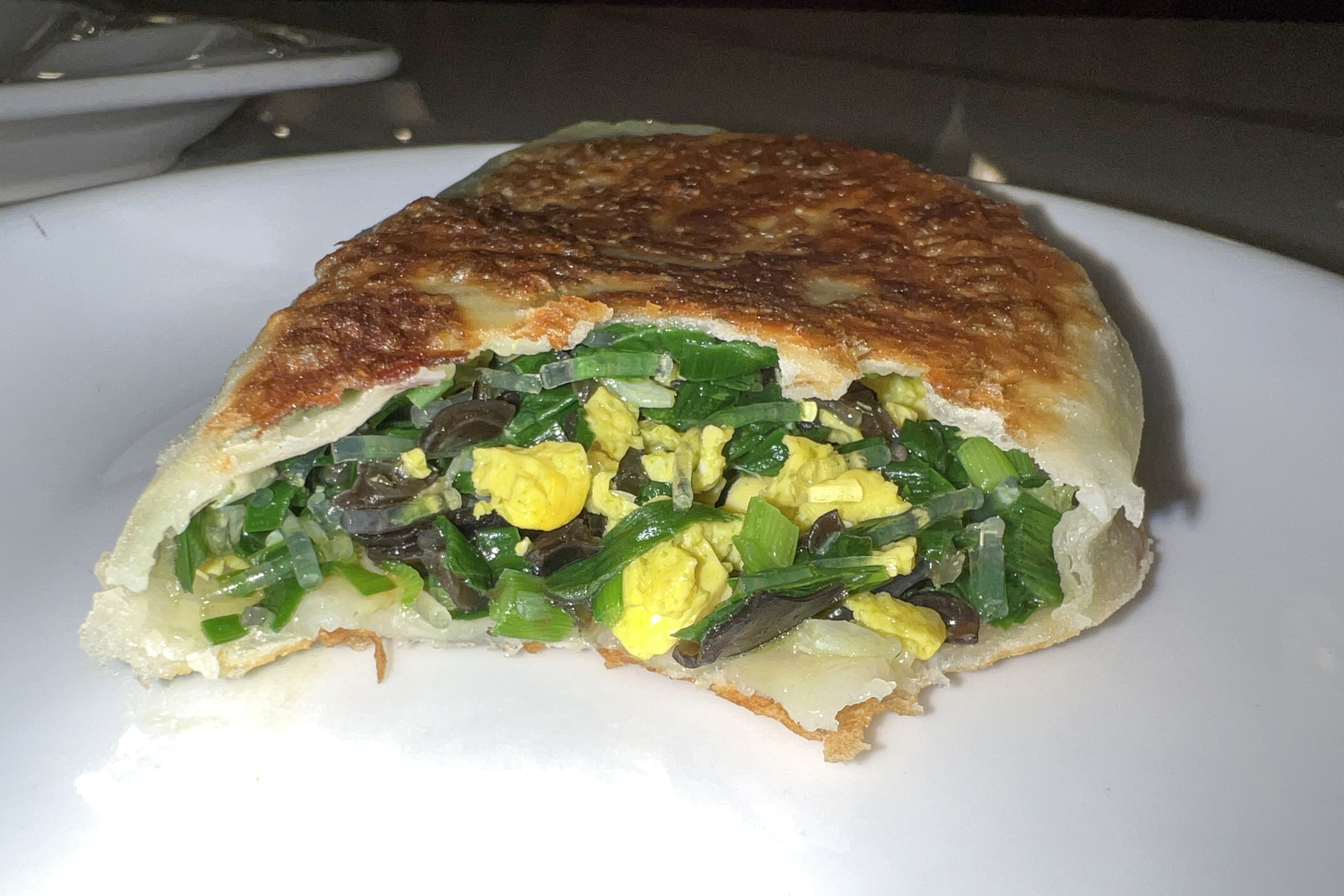
Jiucai hezi, cut open

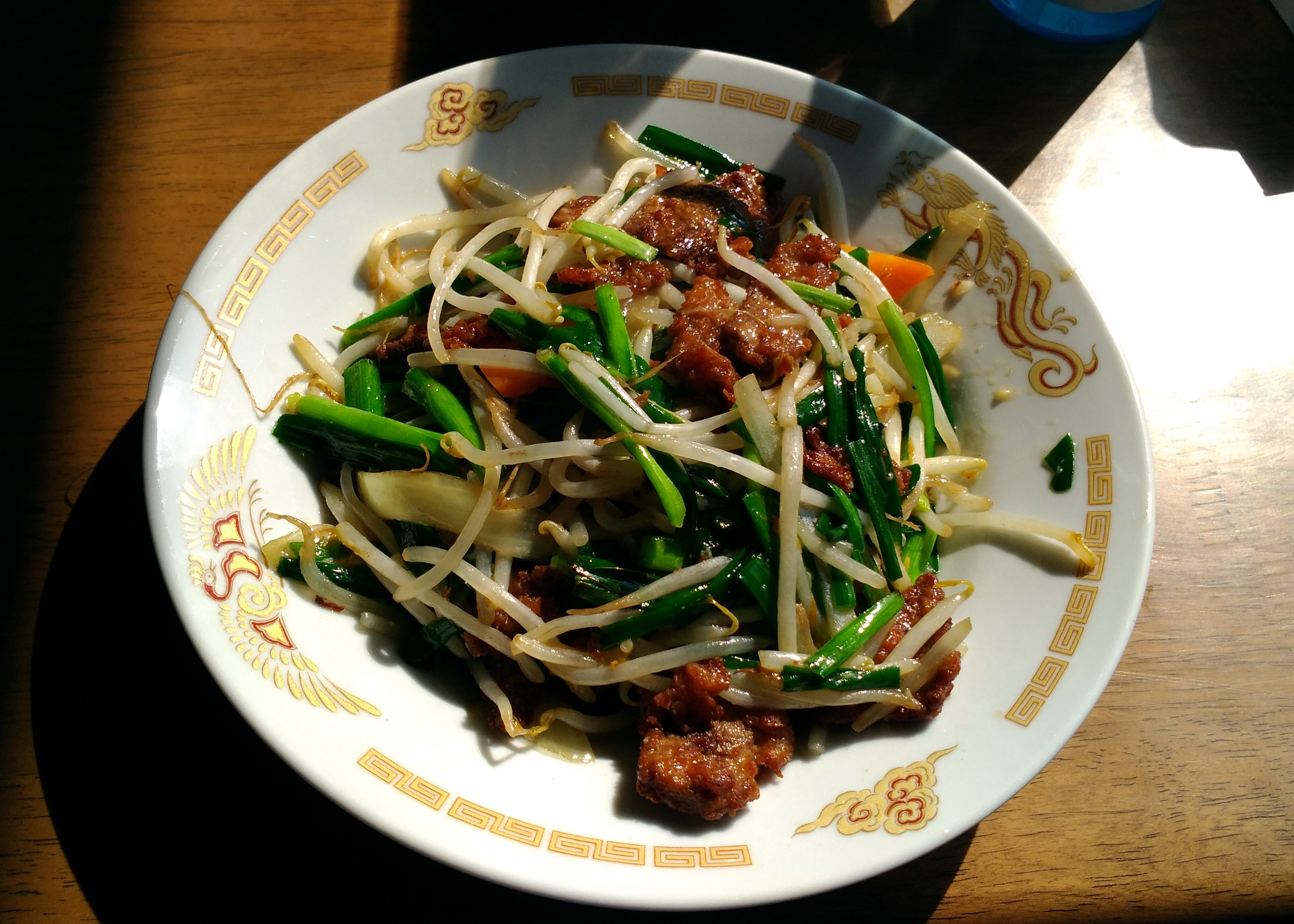
Stir-fried liver and garlic chives

=== India ===
In Manipur and other northeastern states of India, it is grown and used as a substitute for garlic and onion in cooking, and is known as maroi nakuppi (ꯃꯔꯣꯏ ꯅꯥꯀꯨꯞꯄꯤ) or maroi nakupi (ꯃꯔꯣꯏ ꯅꯥꯀꯨꯄꯤ) in Meitei language (Manipuri). In Meitei cuisine, it is prepared into a dish called Maroi Thongba (ꯃꯔꯣꯏ ꯊꯣꯡꯕ), also known as Maroi Bori Thongba (ꯃꯔꯣꯏ ꯕꯣꯔꯤ ꯊꯣꯡꯕ), which is a curry, made with sundried ground lentil nuggets or dumplings.

=== Japan ===
In Japan, where the plant is known as nira (ニラ), it is used both for its garlic-like flavor and its sweetness, in miso soups and salads, stir-fries with eggs, and Japanese dishes such as gyōza dumplings and fried liver.

=== Central Asia ===
In Central Asian countries such as Kazakhstan and Kyrgyzstan, where the plant has been introduced through cultivation by Dungan farmers and ties with neighboring China, garlic chives are known by transliterations of their name. Used in cooking, it is sometimes added as a filling to manty, samsa, laghman, yuta, ashlan-fu, and other typical dishes.

=== Korea ===
Known as buchu (부추), garlic chives are widely used in Korean cuisine. They can be eaten fresh as namul, pickled as kimchi and jangajji, and pan-fried in buchimgae (pancake). They are also one of the most common herbs served with gukbap (soup with rice), as well as a common ingredient in mandu (dumplings).

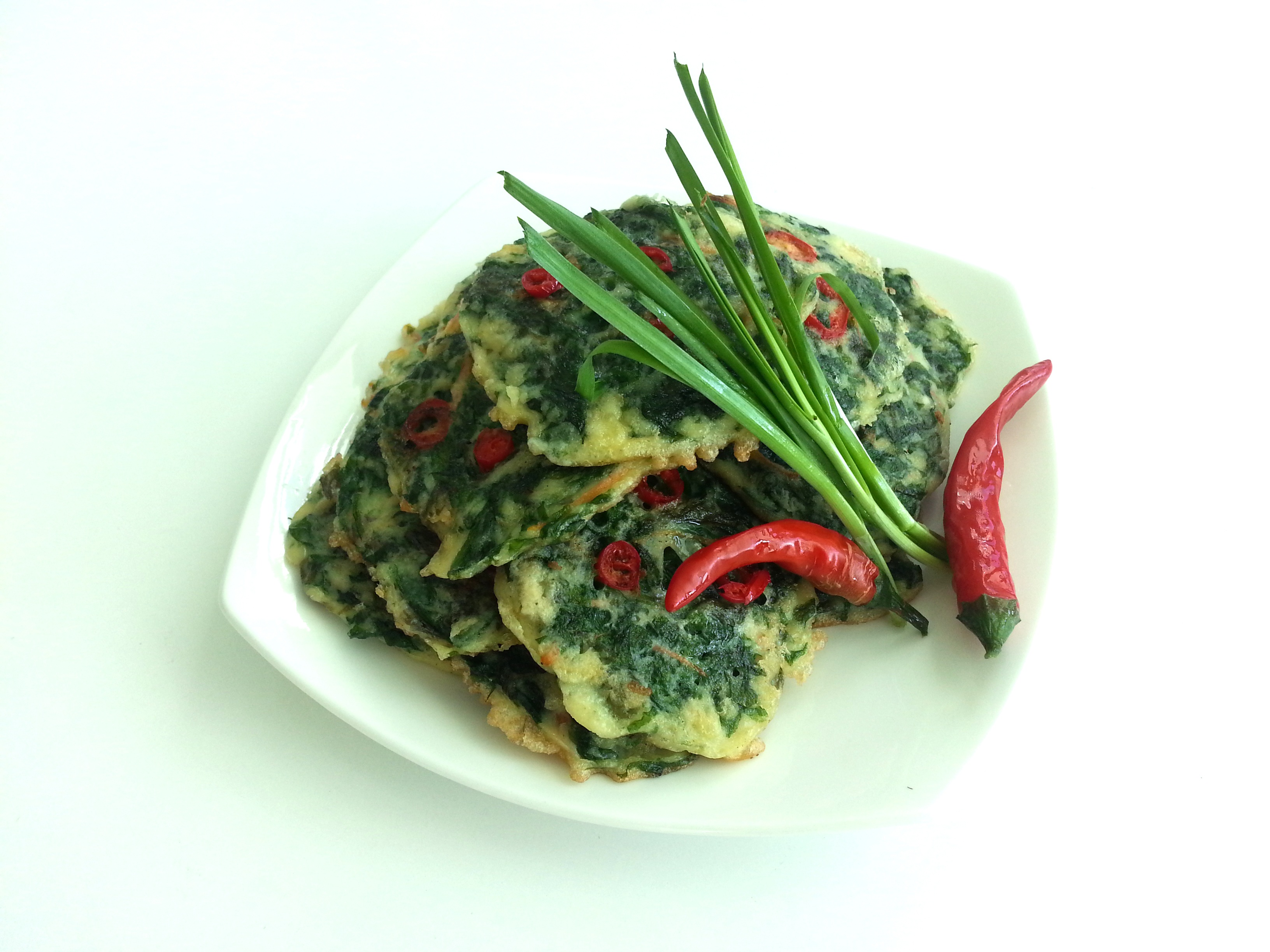
Buchu-jeon (garlic chive pancakes)

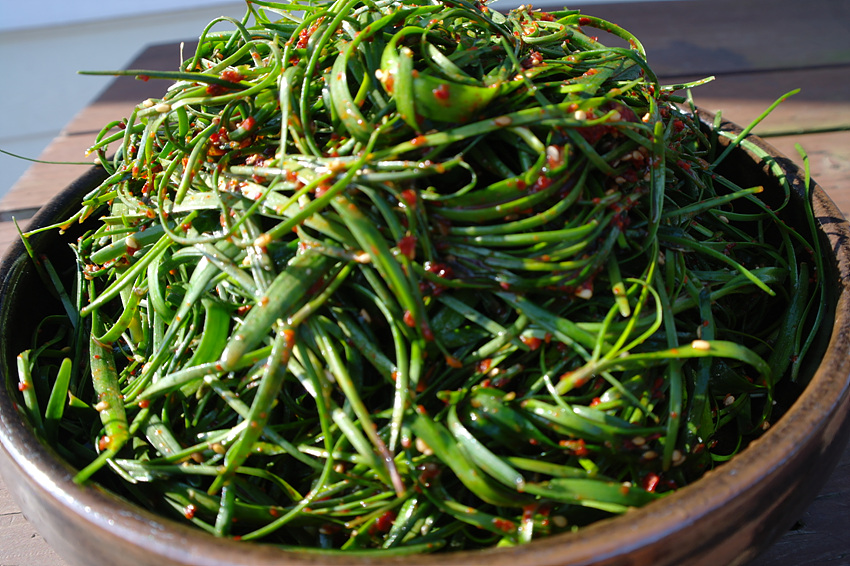
Buchu-geotjeori (garlic chive fresh kimchi)

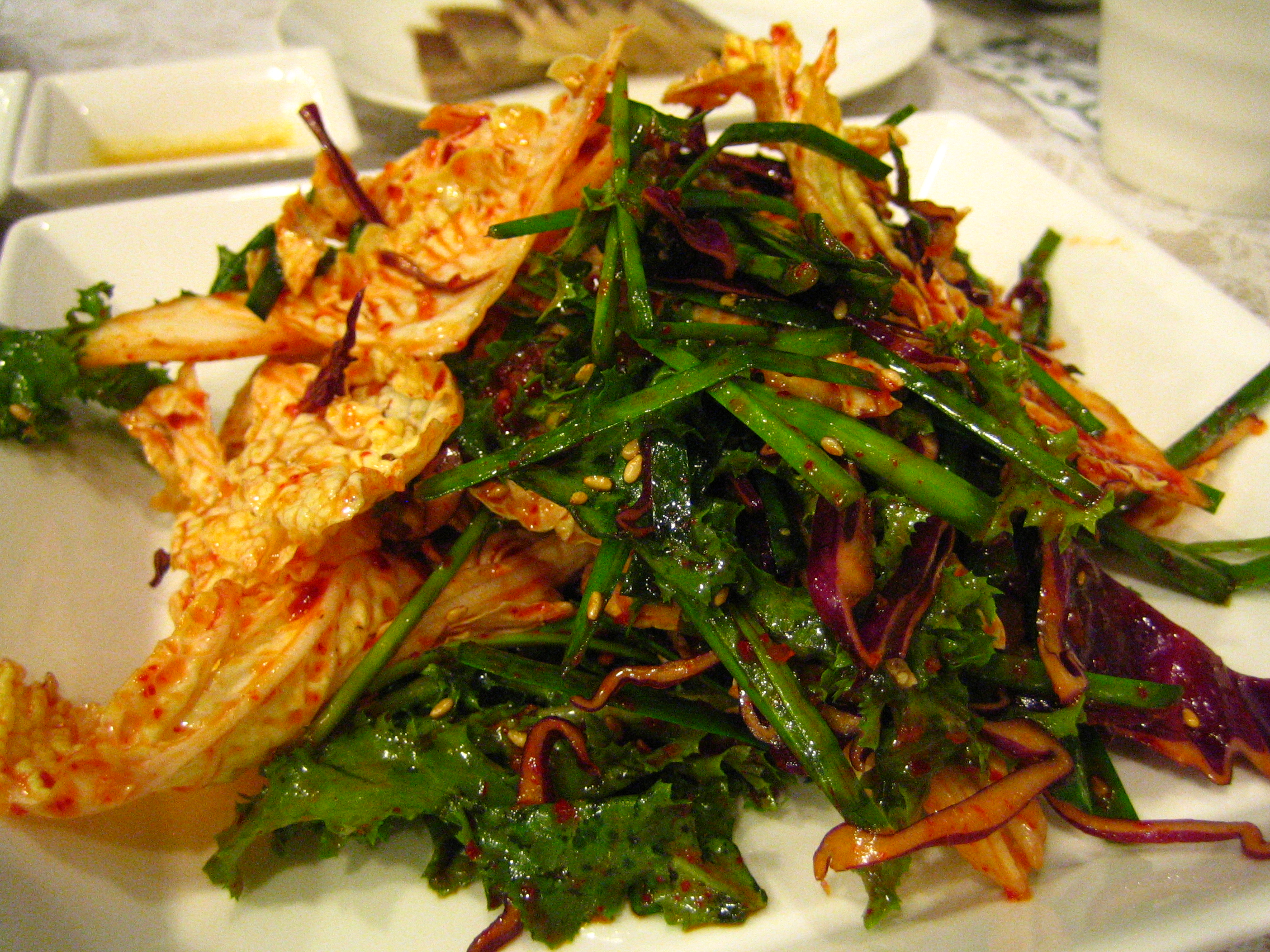
Buchu-kimchi (garlic chive kimchi)

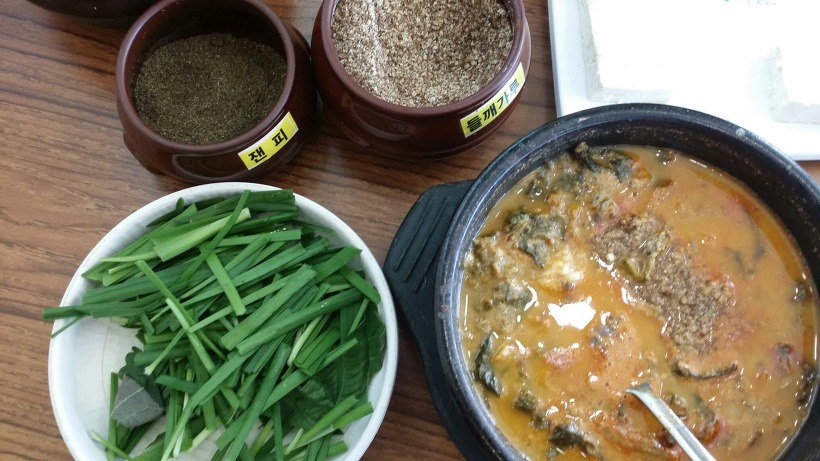
Chueo-tang (loach soup) served with garlic chives

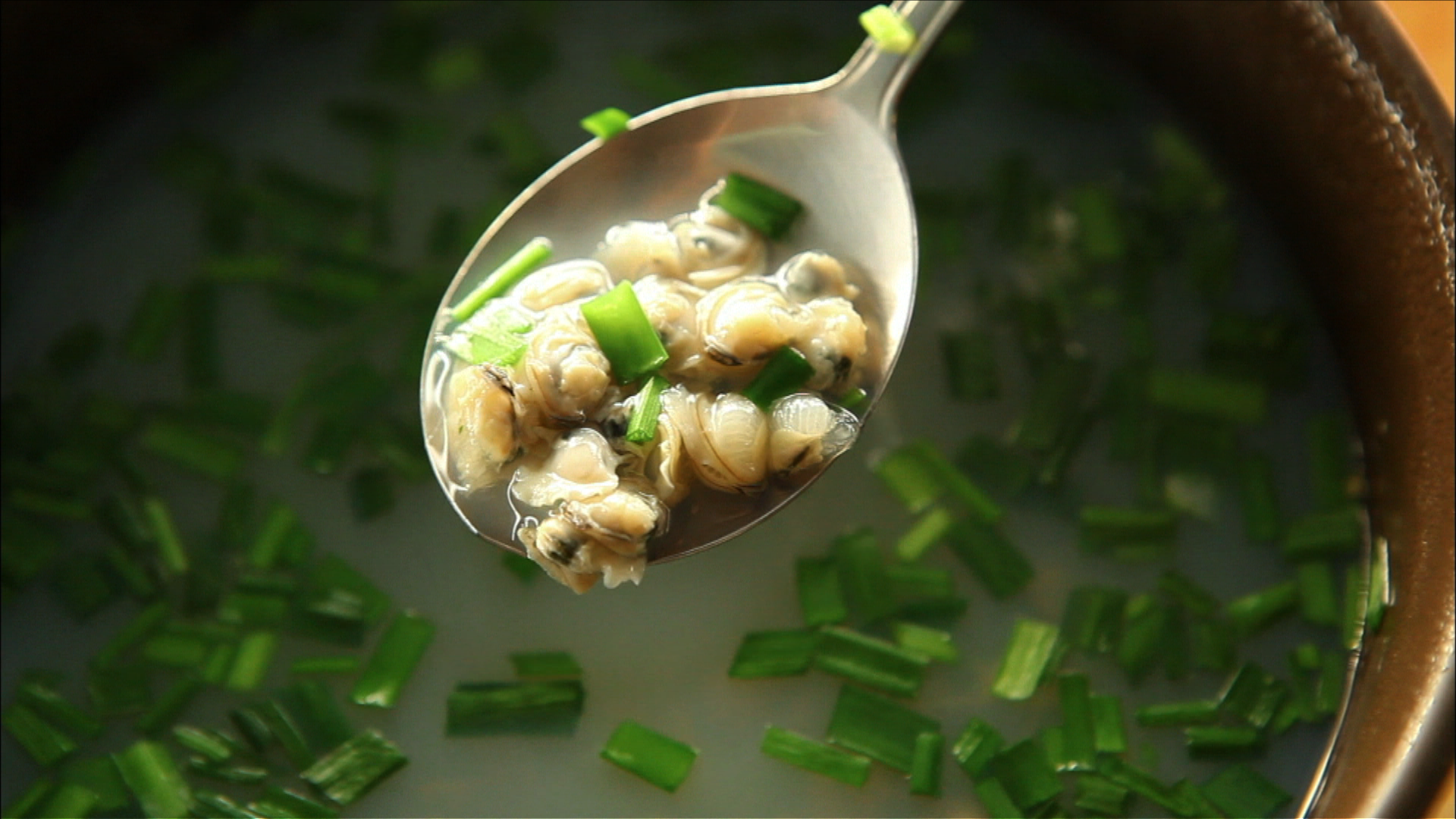
Jaecheop-guk (jaecheop clam soup) with chopped garlic chives in it

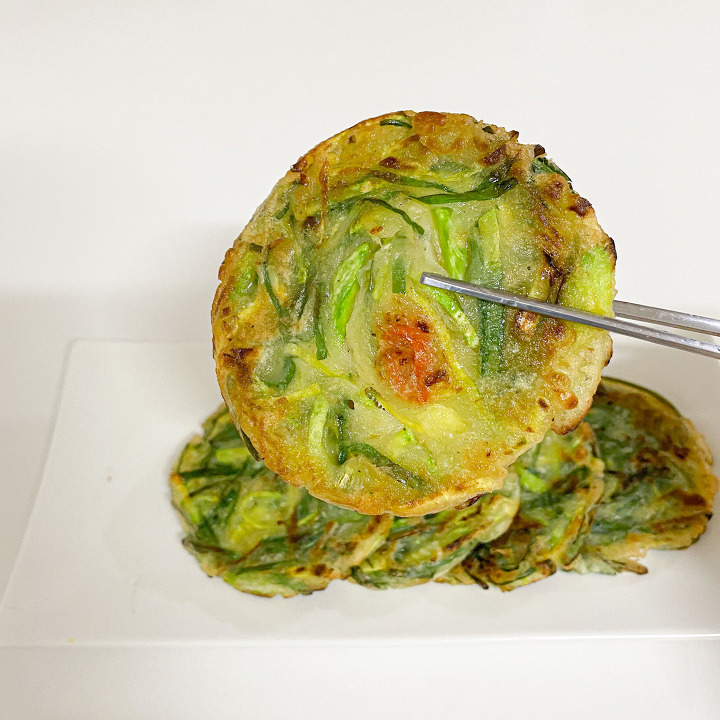
Garlic chive buchimgae (pancake)

=== Nepal ===
In Nepal, cooks fry a curried vegetable dish of potatoes and A. tuberosum known as dunduko sag.

=== Vietnam ===
In Vietnam, the leaves of garlic chives, known as hẹ, are cut up into short pieces and used as the only vegetable in a broth with sliced pork kidneys.

== Gallery ==
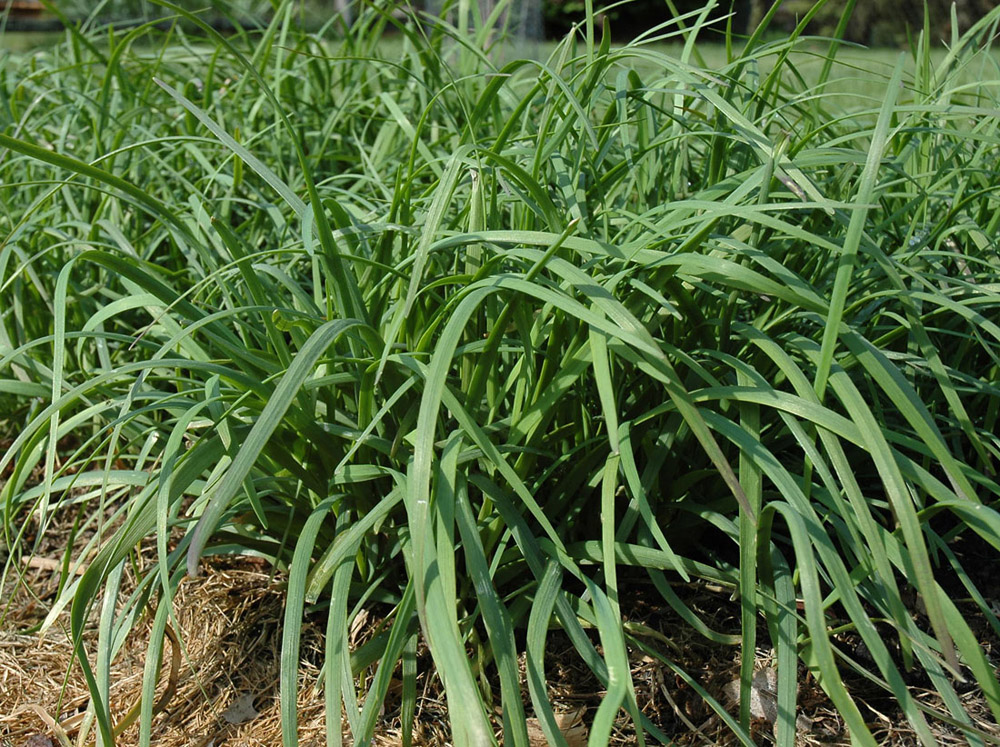
Growing as garden herb

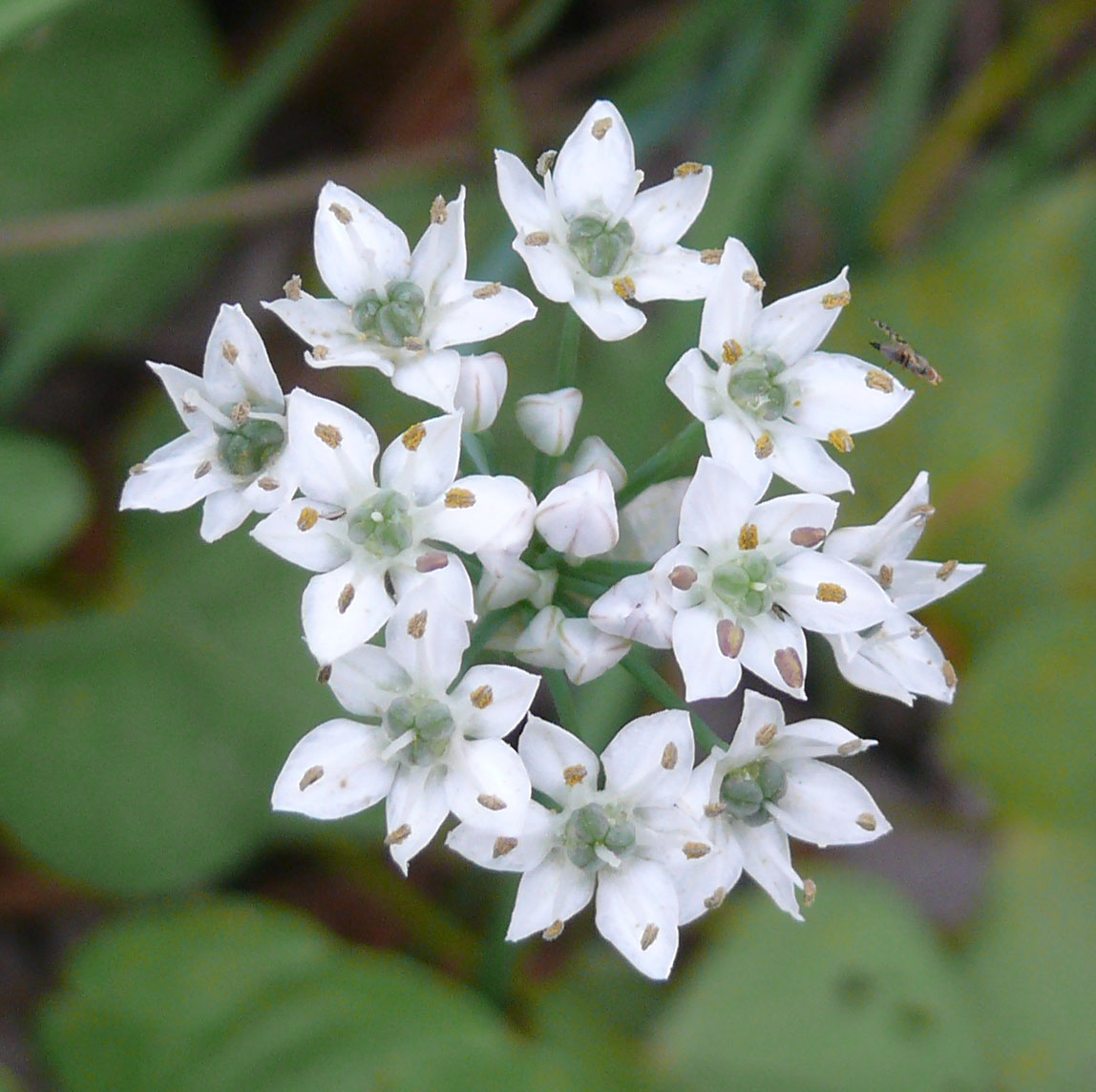
Inflorescence

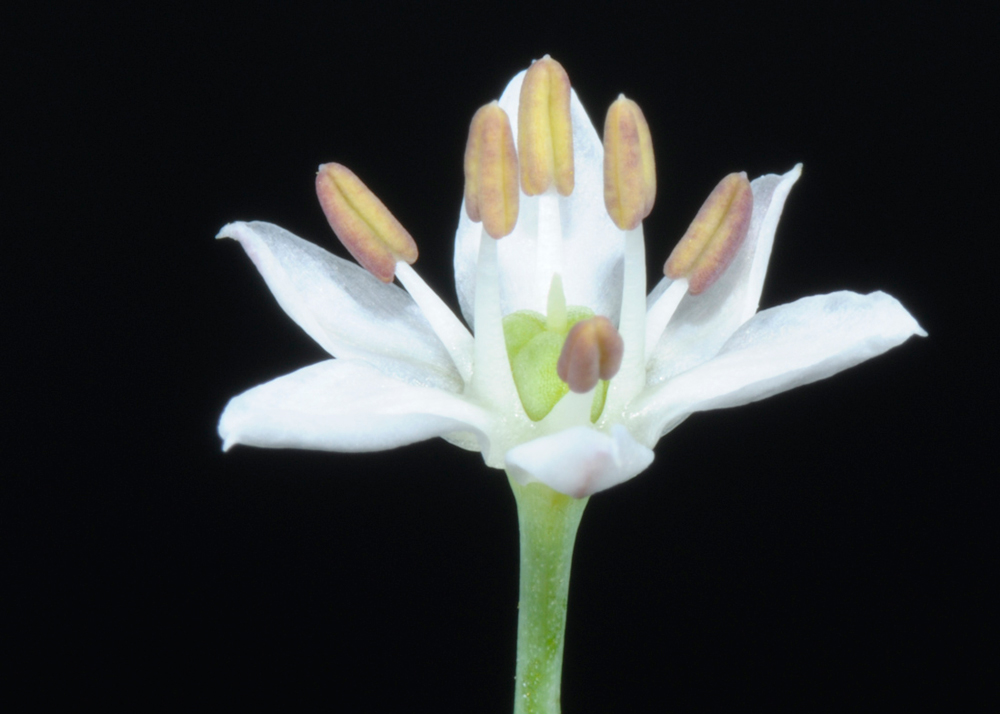
Individual flower

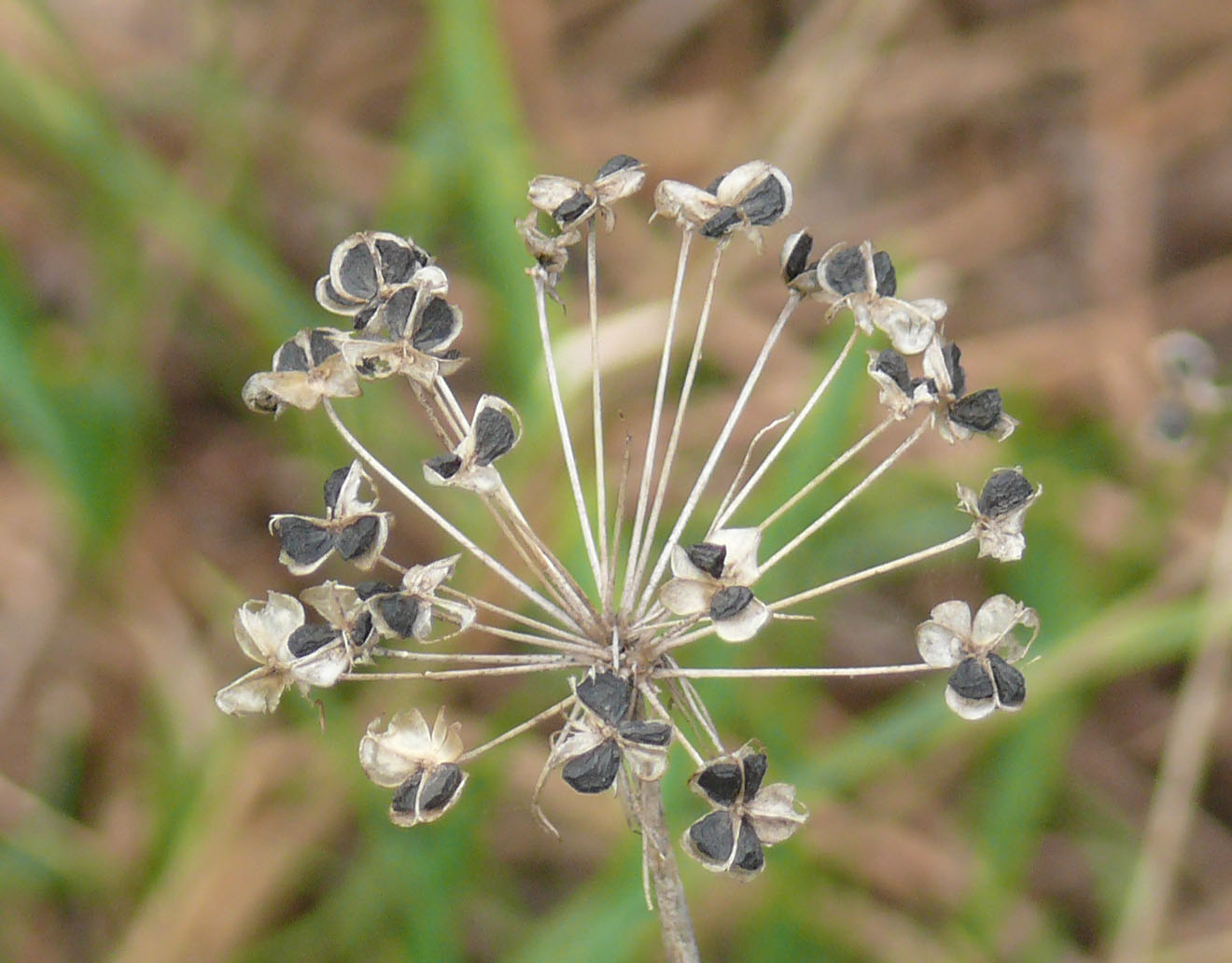
Seeds of garlic chives

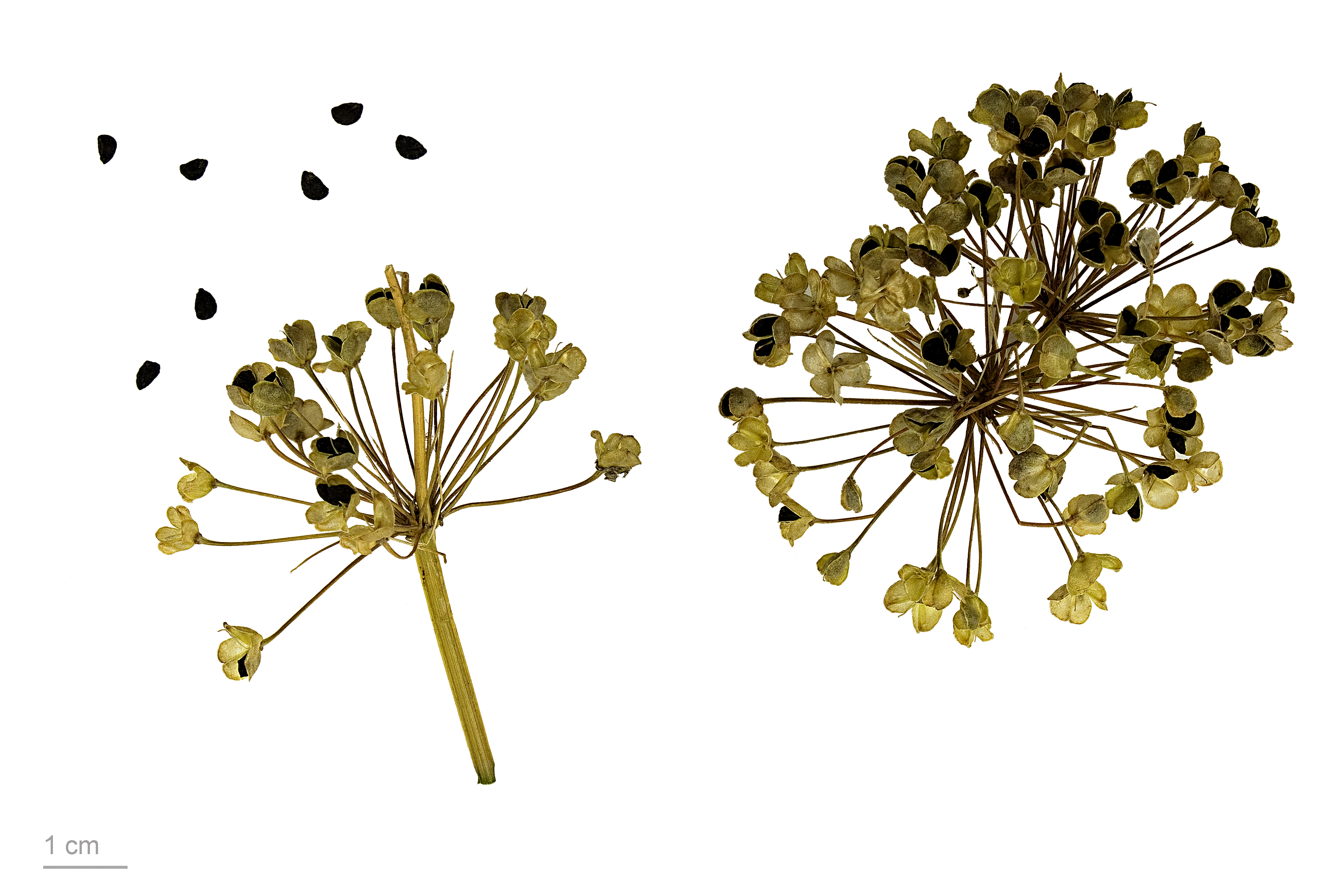
Fruit and seeds

== Bibliography ==
=== Books and monographs ===
- Linnaeus, Carl (1825). Sprengel, Curt Polycarp Joachim (ed.). Systema Vegetabilium vol. ii (16th ed.). Göttingen: Sumtibus Librariae Dieterichianae. p. 38.
- Block, Eric (2009). Garlic and other alliums : the lore and the science. Cambridge: Royal Society of Chemistry. ISBN 978-0-85404-190-9.
- Brewster, James L. (2008). "Chinese chives, Allium tuberosum Rottl.". Onions and other vegetable alliums (2nd ed.). Wallingford, UK: CABI. p. 20. ISBN 978-1-84593-622-8.
- Kays, Stanley J. (2011). "7.13 Allium tuberosum". Cultivated vegetables of the world: a multilingual onomasticon. Wageningen: Wageningen Academic. p. 33. ISBN 9789086867202.
- Larkcom, Joy; Douglass, Elizabeth (2008). Oriental vegetables : the complete guide for the gardening cook (2nd ed.). New York: Kodansha International. ISBN 978-1-56836-370-7.
- Majupuria, Indra (1993). Joys of Nepalese cooking : a most comprehensive and practical book on Nepalese cookery : 371 easy-to-make, kitchen-tested recipes. Lashkar (Gwalior), India: S. Devi. ISBN 9789747315318.
- McGee, Rose Marie Nichols; Stuckey, Maggie (2002). The Bountiful Container. Workman Publishing. ISBN 978-0-7611-1623-3.
- Rabinowitch, H. D.; Currah, L. (2002). Allium Crop Sciences: Recent Advances. CABI Publishing. ISBN 0-85199-510-1.
- Randall, RP (2007). The introduced flora of Australia and its weed status (PDF). Australian Weed Management, University of Adelaide. ISBN 978-1-920932-60-2.
- Zeder, Melinda A.; Bradley, Daniel G; Emshwiller, Eve; Smith, Bruce D, eds. (2006). Documenting domestication: new genetic and archaeological paradigms. Berkeley, Calif.: University of California Press. ISBN 978-0-520-24638-6.

=== Articles and chapters ===
- Friesen, N; Fritsch, RM; Blattner, Frank R (2006). "Phylogeny and new intrageneric classification of Allium (Alliaceae) based on nuclear ribosomal DNA ITS sequences". Aliso. 22: 372–395. doi:10.5642/aliso.20062201.31.
- Li, Q.-Q.; Zhou, S.-D.; He, X.-J.; Yu, Y.; Zhang, Y.-C.; Wei, X.-Q. (21 October 2010). "Phylogeny and biogeography of Allium (Amaryllidaceae: Allieae) based on nuclear ribosomal internal transcribed spacer and chloroplast rps16 sequences, focusing on the inclusion of species endemic to China". Annals of Botany. 106 (5): 709–733. doi:10.1093/aob/mcq177. PMC 2958792. PMID 20966186.
- Oyuntsetseg, B; Blattner, F. R.; Friesen, N. (2012). "Diploid Allium ramosum from East Mongolia: A missing link for the origin of the crop species A. tuberosum?". Erforsch. Biol. Ress. Mongolei (Halle/Saale). 12: 415–424.
- Saini, N; Wadhwa, S; Singh, G. K. (2013). "Comparative study between cultivated garlic (Allium sativum) and wild garlic (Allium tuberosum)". Global R Trad Rep. 1 (1): 12–24. Archived from the original on 2016-03-04.
- Blattner, Frank R; Friesen, N. Relationship between Chinese chive (Allium tuberosum) and its putative progenitor A. ramosum as assessed by random amplified polymorphic DNA (RAPD). in Zeder et al (2006, Chapter 10. pp. 134–142)
- Fritsch, RM; Friesen, N. Evolution, domestication and taxonomy., in Rabinowitch & Currah (2003, pp. 5–30)

=== Websites ===
- "Allium tuberosum", World Checklist of Selected Plant Families, Royal Botanic Gardens, Kew
- "The Plant List: A Working List of all Plant Species v. 1.1". 2013.
- "USDA PLANTS database. Allium tuberosum".
- "Floridata". Floridata Plant Encyclopedia. 2015.
- "Plants For A Future".
- RHS (2015). "Allium tuberosum (Chinese chives)". Royal Horticultural Society.
- Allium tuberosum Rottl. ex Spreng. Medicinal Plant Images Database (School of Chinese Medicine, Hong Kong Baptist University) (in Chinese) (in English)
- Hilty, John (2015). "Garlic chives". Illinois Wildflowers.
- "Allium tuberosum Rottler ex Spreng". nparks.gov.sg.
- "Allium tuberosum Rottler ex Spreng". Schede di botanica. Flora Italiana. Archived from the original on 30 March 2014.
- Norrington-Davies, Tom (8 April 2006). "Spring it on them". The Telegraph.
- Maangchi (26 February 2008). "Asian chives".
- "Chinese Chives – Hẹ". Vietnamese Herbs. 2015.
- Goh, Kenneth (30 March 2015). "Shredded Chicken Braised E-Fu Noodles (鸡丝韭黄伊府面）". Guai Shu Shu.
- Mahr, Susan (30 August 2010). "Garlic Chives, Allium tuberosum". University of Wisconsin Extension Master Gardener Program.
- "Allium tuberosum". Missouri Botanical Garden.
- Miller, Sally G (14 June 2014). "Garlic Chives- Great In the Garden, But..." Dave's Garden.
- "Allium tuberosum". Hortipedia.
- "Allium tuberosum 'Monstrosum'". Staudengärtnerei Gaißmayer. 2015.
