= Turnover (food) =

Baked or fried filled good

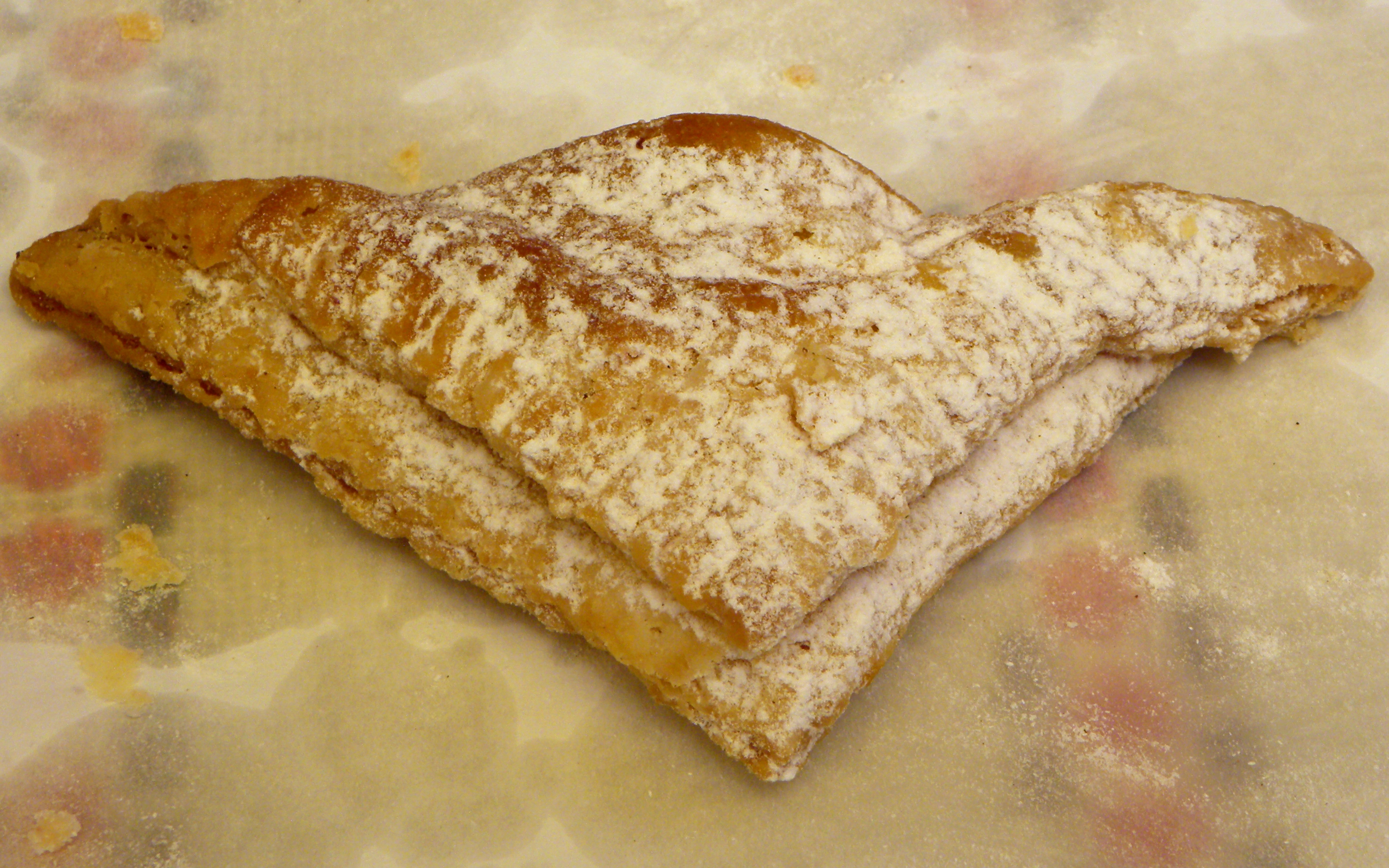
- An apple-filled turnover
- Alternative names: Various (see list)
- Type: Pastry
- Variations: Savoury or sweet

A turnover is a baked or fried food, made by placing a filling on a piece of pastry or viennoiserie dough. The dough is then folded over and sealed, and is then cooked by either baking or frying. Turnovers can be sweet or savoury and are often eaten as a sort of portable meal or dessert. Throughout the world, turnovers are known by different names. For example, in Spanish-speaking countries they are known as empanadas, while pasty, originally a Cornish term, has spread across the globe.

It is common for sweet turnovers to have a fruit filling and be made with a puff pastry or shortcrust pastry dough and covered with icing. Savoury turnovers generally contain meat, vegetables or a mixture of both, and can be made with any sort of pastry dough.

== Fillings ==
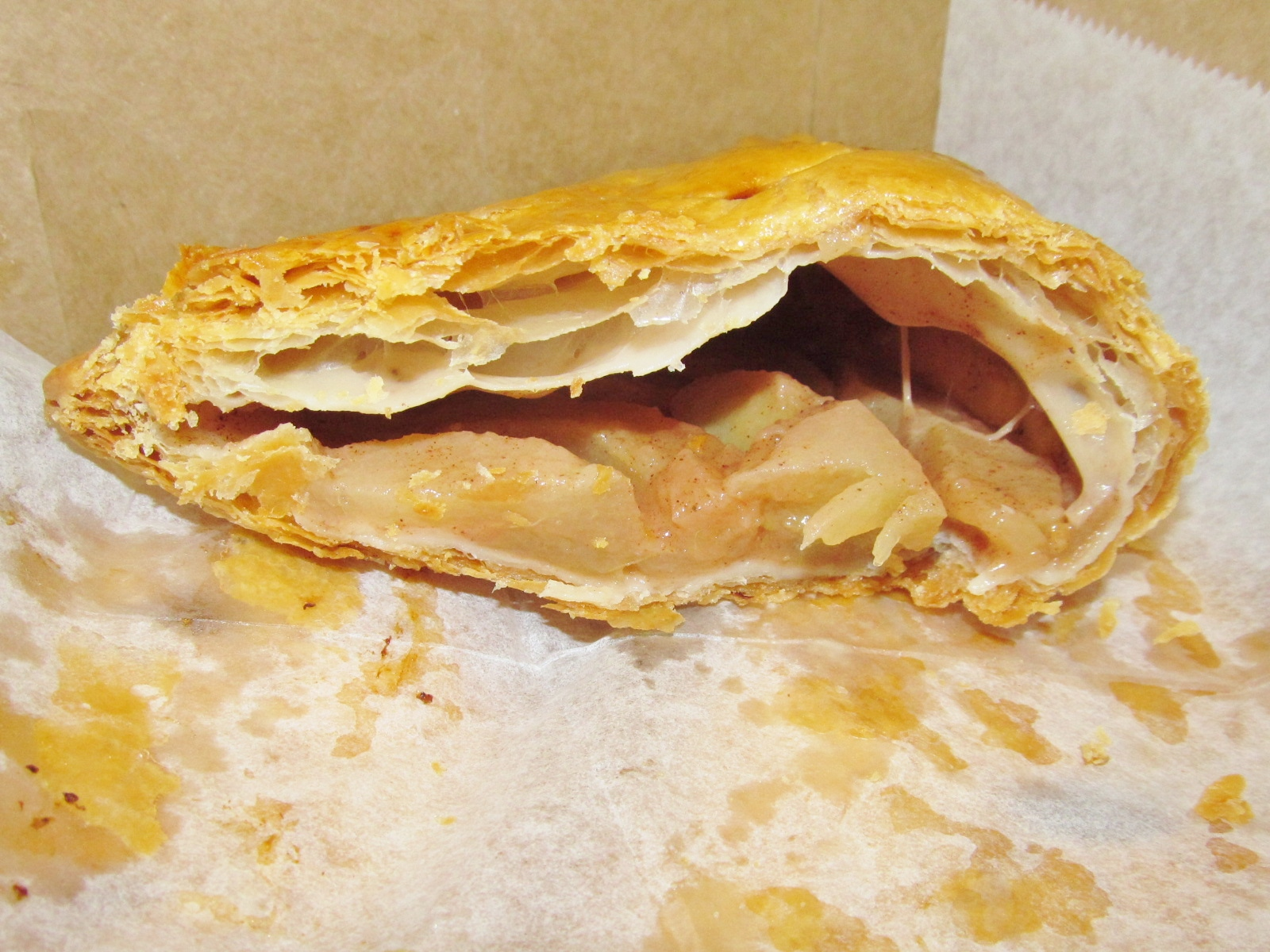
Apple filling in a turnover

Common turnover fillings include fruits such as apples, peaches and cherries, meats like chicken, beef and pork, vegetables such as potatoes, broccoli and onions, and savoury ingredients like cheese. Specialty versions are also found, such as wild rabbit and leek. In the United Kingdom, turnovers are usually filled with cooked apples, but any fruit can be used, as described in Mrs Beeton's Book of Household Management.

In the United States, savoury products that are identified as a turnover (for example, "Beef Turnover" or "Cheesy Chicken Turnover") have to contain a certain amount of meat or poultry under the Food Standards and Labeling Policy. A similar law, the Meat Pie and Sausage Roll Regulation 1967 exists in the United Kingdom, which states that pasties must contain meat that is a minimum 12.75% of the weight of the pastry. In Australia and New Zealand, the Food Standards Australia New Zealand rules on meat pies, which covers turnovers, states that they must contain a minimum of 25% "meat flesh".

== List of turnover names ==
Around the world, turnovers are known by different names. For example, in the United Kingdom, turnover is generally used as the name for sweet versions, however savoury turnovers can be called pasty, bridie (a Scottish term), clanger or oggie. There are different names used around the world:

Name	Image	Sweet or savoury	Countries/Area used	Ref.
Apfeltasche		Sweet	Germany	
Appelflappen		Sweet	Netherlands	
Apple turnover		Sweet	United States, United Kingdom, Australia, New Zealand, Canada	
Börek		Sweet or savoury	Middle East, Balkans	
Bourekas		Sweet or savoury	Israel	
Bridie		Savoury	Scotland	
Briouat		Sweet or savoury	Morocco	
Chausson au Citron		Sweet	France	
Chausson aux pommes		Sweet	France	
Clanger		Savoury	England	
Curry beef turnover		Savoury	Hong Kong	
Curry puff		Savoury	Brunei, Indonesia, Malaysia, Myanmar, Singapore, Thailand	
Echpochmak		Savoury	Russia	
Empanada		Sweet or savoury	Spain, Argentine, Peru, Nicaragua, Chile, Colombia, Cuba, Ecuador, Mexico, Venezuela, Uruguay, Sardinia, Philippines, Sicily, Tunisia, North Sulawesi	
Fish pie		Savoury	Trindad and Tobago	
Flip		Sweet or savoury	Newfoundland and Labrador	
Fried pie		Sweet	United States	
Haitian patty		Savoury	Haiti	
Jamaican patty		Savoury	Caribbean	
Kibinai	A wicker basket filled with Lithuanian Kibinai pastries	Savoury	Lithuania	
Natchitoches meat pie		Savoury	Louisiana	
Nigerian meat pie		Savoury	Nigeria	
Panades		Savoury	Belize	
Pastel Federal		Sweet	Argentina	
Pasty		Sweet or savoury	United Kingdom, United States, Australia, New Zealand, South Africa	
Paste		Sweet or savoury	Mexico	
Pastel		Sweet or savoury	Brazil	
Patties		Savoury	Sri Lanka, Bangladesh	
Salteña		Savoury	Bolivia	
Samosa		Savoury	West Asia, East Africa, Central Asia, Southeast Asia	
Sambousek		Savoury	Middle Eastern	
Shingara		Savoury	Bangladesh	
Welsh Oggie	External image: Welsh Oggie at bethhaslam.com.	Savoury	Wales	

== Similar dishes ==
There are culinary dishes that look similar to turnovers, but are not made from pastry dough. In Italy, the Calzone, which originated in Naples in the 18th century, is essentially a folded pizza. Traditionally made from salted bread dough, baked in an oven and is stuffed with salami, ham or vegetables, mozzarella, ricotta and Parmesan or pecorino cheese, as well as an egg. The Panzerotti, which originated in the Apulia region, are a smaller hand-held version of a Calzone, and are classically filled with tomato and mozzarella, though other typical Italian fillings are common such as cured meats, varied cheeses and greens such as the Pugliese favourite: cime di rapa. Panzerotti are deep-fried instead of being baked. Another folded and stuffed bread item is Scaccia, a Sicilian stuffed flatbread. Bierock are a yeast dough pocket sandwich with savory filling that originated in Eastern Europe, with the yeast dough folded over the fillings.

== See also ==
- List of pastries
- List of stuffed dishes
- List of pies, tarts and flans
- Blachindla
- Calzone
- Hot Pockets
- Jiucai hezi
- Knish
- Panzerotti
- Pâté chaud
- Pot pie
- Stromboli
