= Bridie =

Scottish meat pasty

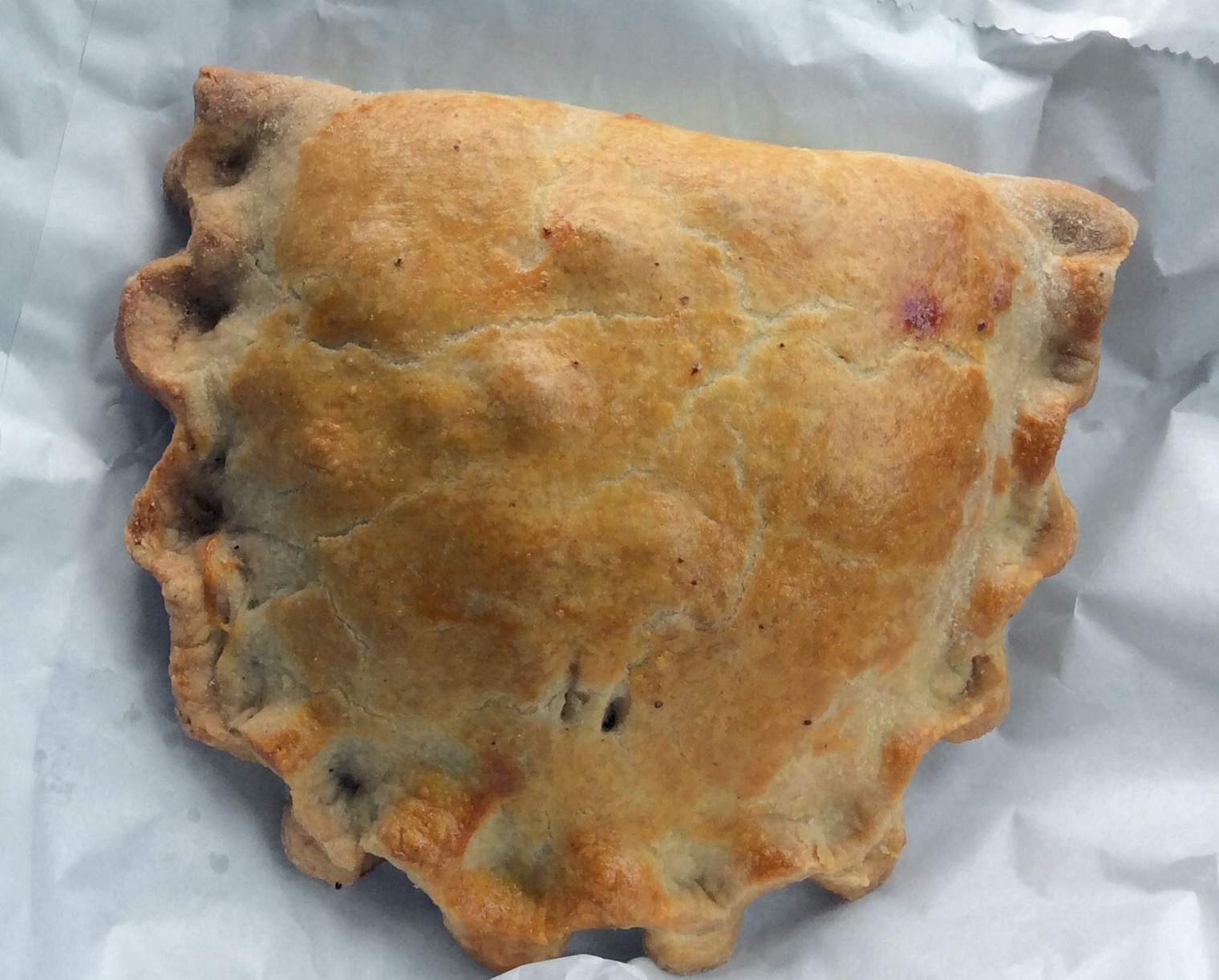
- A bridie
- Alternative names: Forfar bridie
- Type: Savoury pasty / turnover
- Place of origin: Scotland
- Region or state: Angus
- Main ingredients: Pie crust, minced steak, butter, beef suet

A bridie or Forfar bridie is a Scottish meat pasty, a type of turnover that originates from Forfar, Scotland.

== History and preparation ==
Bridies are said to have been invented in the 1850s by a baker in Forfar. The name may refer to the pie's frequent presence on wedding menus, where the horseshoe shape was intended to bring good luck, or to Margaret Bridie of Glamis, who sold the pies at the town's Buttermarket.

Bakers in Forfar traditionally use shortcrust pastry for their bridies, but in other parts of Scotland, flaky pastry is sometimes substituted. The filling of a bridie consists of minced steak, butter, and beef suet seasoned with salt and pepper. It is sometimes made with minced onions. Before baking, the bridie's filling is placed on pastry dough, which is then folded into a semi-circular shape; finally, the edges are crimped. If the baker pokes one hole in the top of a bridie, this indicates that it is plain, or without onions; two holes mean that it does contain onions, a convention which is also applied to a Scotch pie.

== Cultural references ==
The bridie is the subject of the Dundee Scots shibboleth Twa bridies, a plen ane an an ingin ane an a (Two bridies, a plain one and an onion one as well).

Forfar Athletic Football Club, who play in the Scottish Professional Football League, have a bridie as their mascot.

== See also ==
- Turnover (food) – a sweet or savory filled pastry
