= Zom (food) =

Traditional Yemenite soup

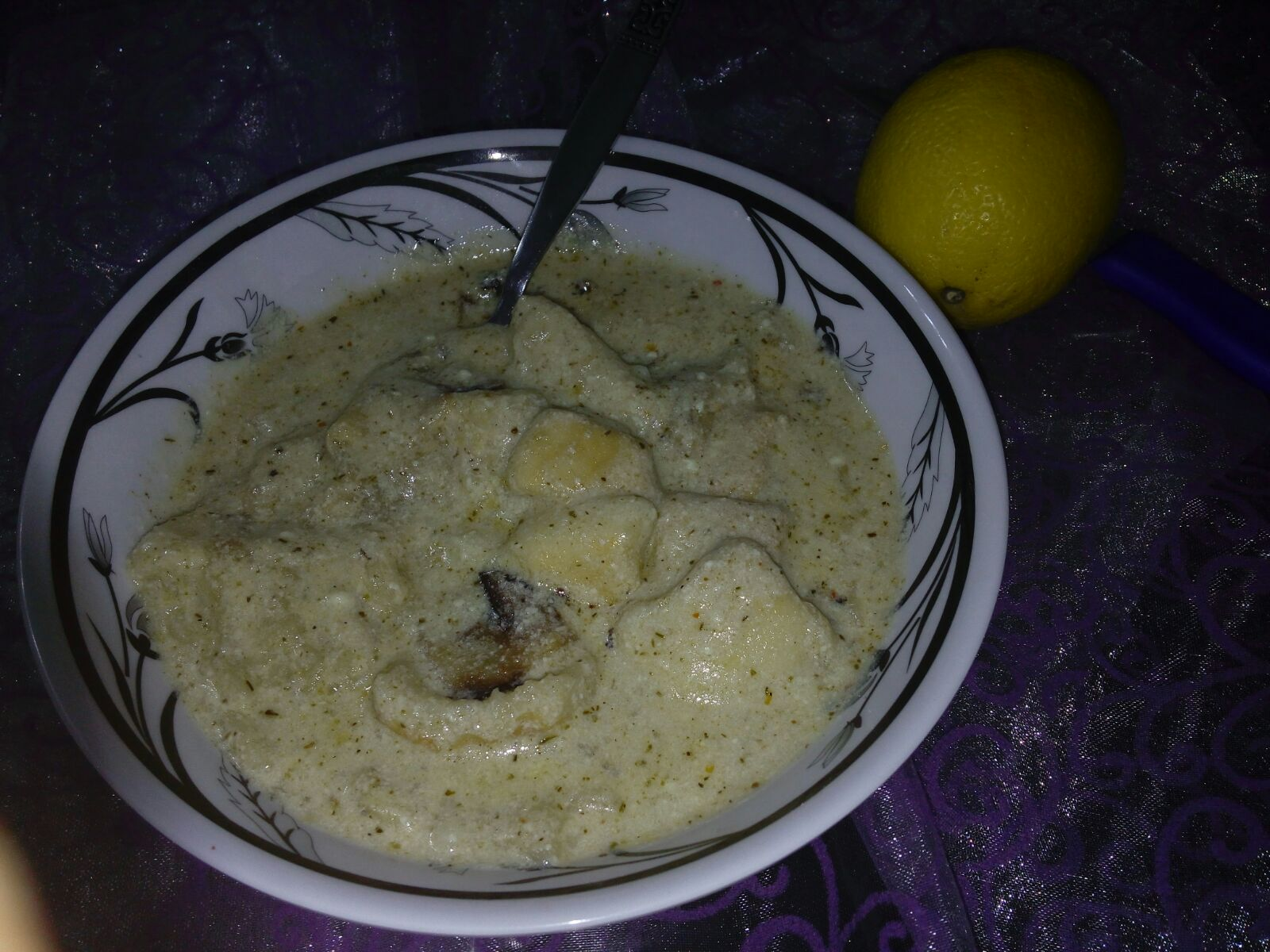
- Alternative names: Yemenite Jewish yogurt soup
- Type: Soup
- Place of origin: Yemen
- Region or state: The Middle East
- Created by: Yemenite Jews
- Serving temperature: Warm
- Main ingredients: Israeli soft cheese or strained yogurt, sour cream, and/or quark, flour, lemon juice, salt

Zom is a traditional Yemenite Jewish soup that is most commonly served as part of the Yom Kippur break fast among those in the Yemenite Jewish community, mostly in Israel.

== Overview ==
"“My mom put challah in the oven until it was crispy and we’d eat the zom with samnah, schug and challah, it’s comforting, it’s hot, and it’s nice after you haven’t eaten for two days. I still eat it every year, after 38 years this is the dish we eat after Yom Kippur.”

— Rinat Tzadok, Yemenite Israeli chef and cookbook author, Jewish Food Society

Zom is typically made by mixing together various Israeli soft cheeses such as the 5% and 9% fat varieties, which are similar to quark or strained yogurt, along with water, a thickener such as flour, and salt. Other Jewish communities such as the Bulgarian Jews eat a similar soup. Zom is traditionally consumed after the observance of Yom Kippur as part of breaking the fast, and is accompanied by samneh (a smoked, fermented clarified butter), schug (a Yemenite Jewish green chili hot sauce), and bread such as challah or kubaneh which is used for dipping.

== See also ==
- Kubaneh
- Fatoot samneh
- Challah
