= Ziva (dish) =

Israeli savoury pastry

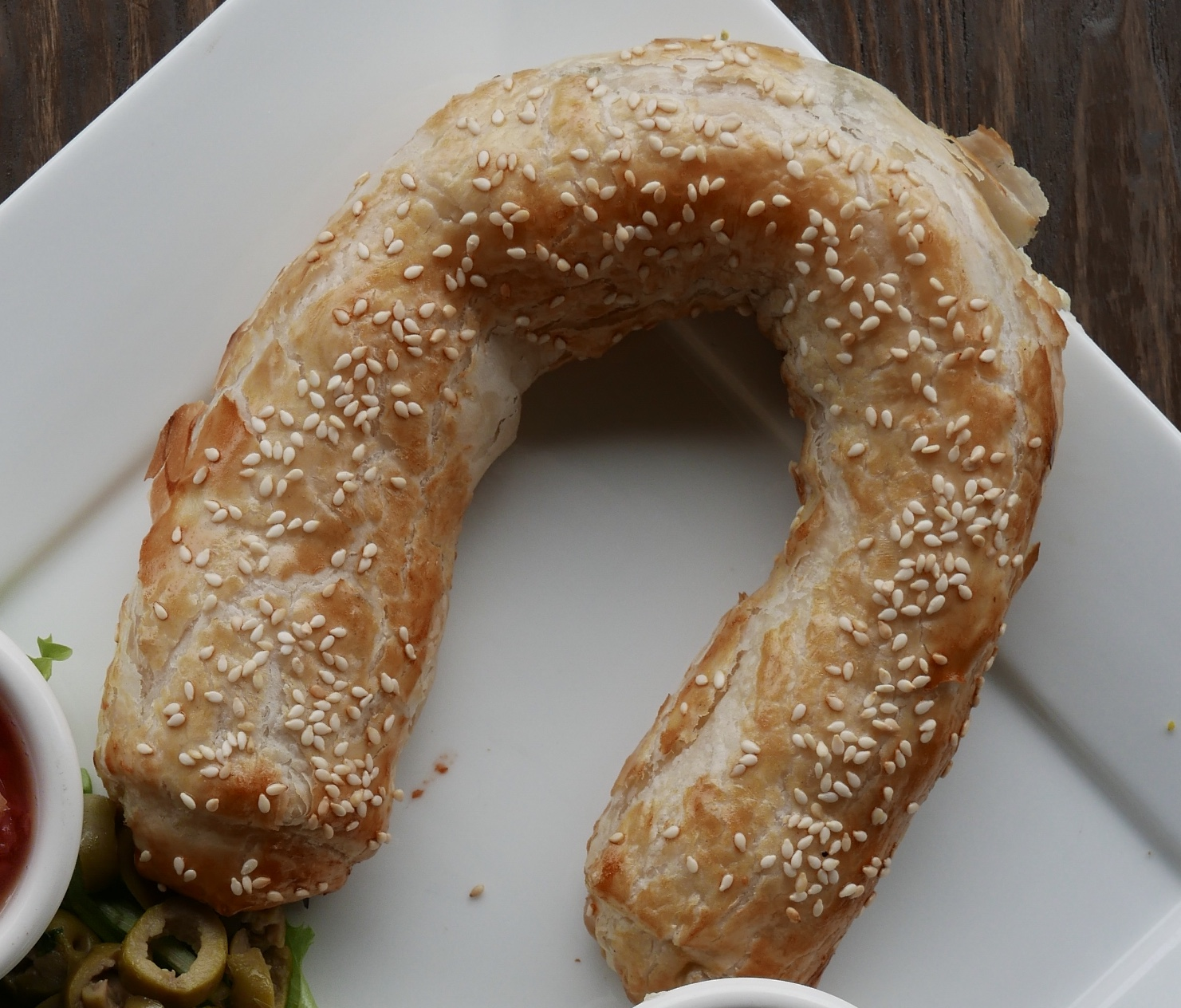
- Type: Meal
- Place of origin: Israel
- Region or state: Tel Aviv
- Main ingredients: Laminated dough, cheese, olives, nigella seeds, sesame seeds.
- Variations: Tzfat cheese, Feta cheese, Emek Cheese stuffing as well as tomato sauce

Ziva (Hebrew: זיוה) is an Israeli dish made of puff pastry topped with sesame seeds, and stuffed with cheese and olives. Ziva is served at home and in restaurants. Ziva is cooked in a style similar to the Yemenite Malawach but its ingredients more closely resemble börek, both of which are also common in Israel. Ziva is usually served alongside a hot sauce (skhug), eggs and Israeli salad.

Ziva is thought to have been invented by chef Neri Avneri's wife at the Nargilla restaurant in 1989. TasteAtlas listed it as the third lowest-rated Israeli snack.

== See also ==
- Malawach
- Bourekas
- Israeli cuisine
- List of pastries
