= Laminated dough =

Layers of dough separated by butter

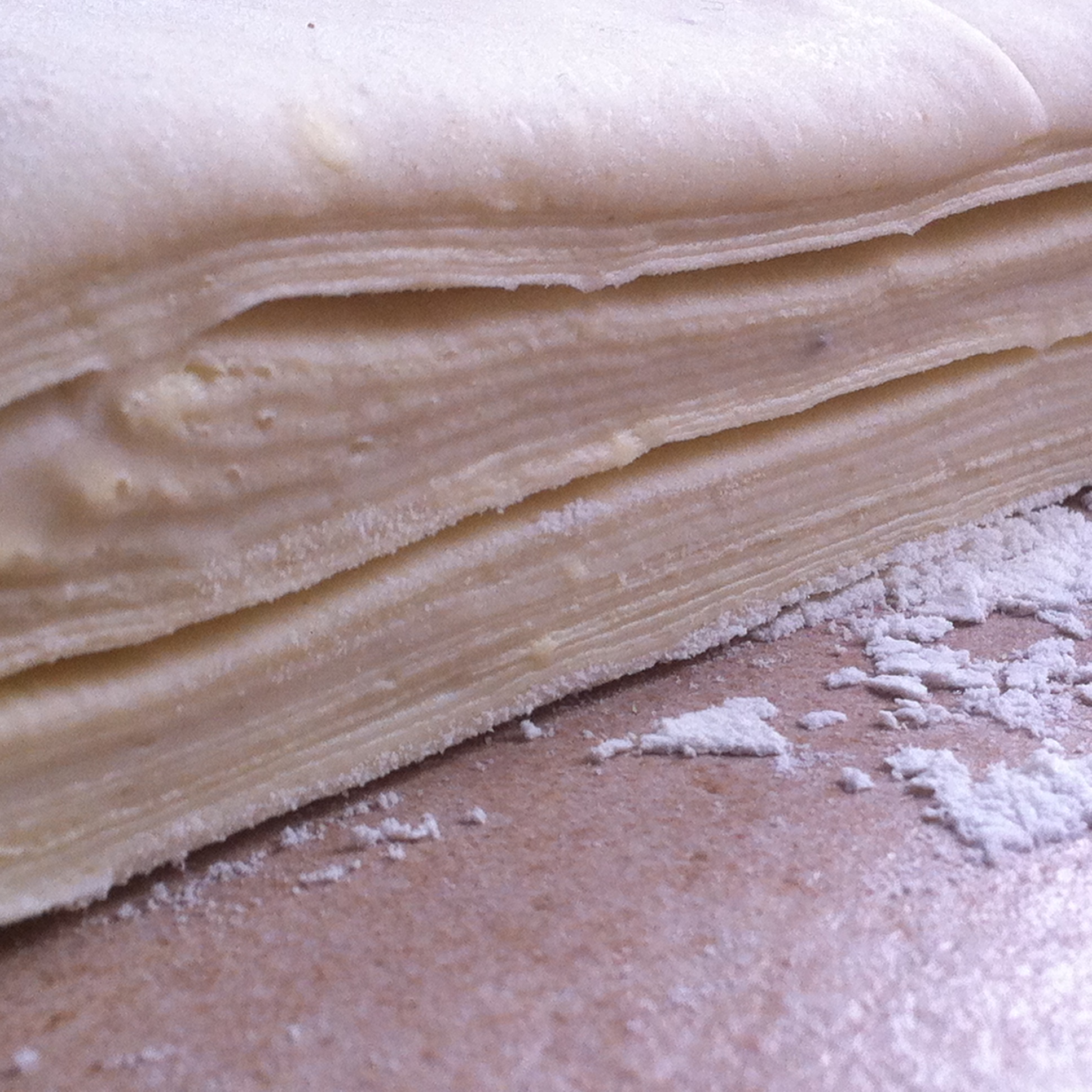
Puff pastry, a type of laminated dough, prior to baking

Laminated dough is a culinary preparation consisting of many thin layers of dough separated by butter or other solid fat, produced by repeated folding and rolling. Such doughs may contain more than eighty layers. During baking, water in the butter vaporizes and expands, causing the dough to puff up and separate, while the lipids in the butter essentially fry the dough, resulting in a light, flaky product.

Pastries using laminated doughs include:

- Viennoiserie, used for croissant, from France
- Danish pastry, a type of Viennoiserie, made with yeast-leavened dough, from Austria via Denmark
- Flaky or Rough Puff pastry
- Jachnun, a Yemenite Jewish pastry
- Kouign-amann, a sweet Breton cake from north-western France
- Kubaneh, a traditional Yemenite Jewish bread
- Malawach, a Yemenite Jewish flatbread
- Paratha, a flatbread native to South Asia
- M'semen, a traditional flatbread of northern Africa
- Puff pastry

== See also ==
- Dough sheeting, an industrial preparation technique
- Filo pastry, used in applications such as baklava, strudel, and spanakopita, where the dough itself is not laminated
- Kâhi, an Iraqi dough that can be mixed with cream and sugar syrup
- List of pastries
