= Bukharan Jewish cuisine =

Traditional cuisine of the Bukharian Jewish community

Bukharan Jewish cuisine is the traditional cuisine originating from the Bukharian Jewish community of Central Asia, who now mostly reside in Israel and the United States.

== Overview ==
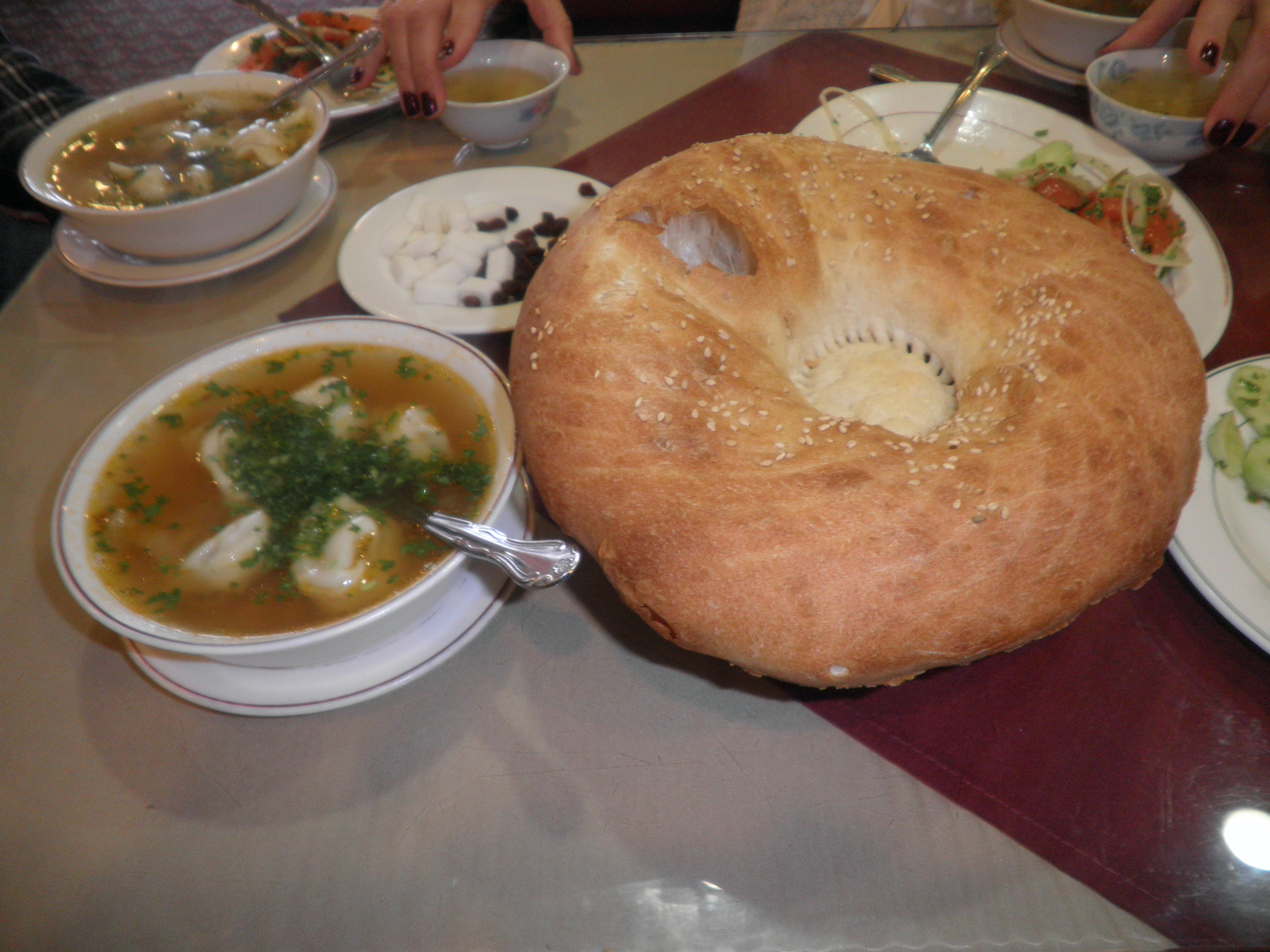
Central Asian–style dumpling soup called shurbo dushpera or tushpera (left), along with traditional tandoor bread called lepyoshka in Russian and non in Uzbek, Tajik, and Bukharian (right)

The cooking of Bukharan Jews forms a distinct cuisine within Uzbekistan, subject to the restrictions of Jewish dietary laws. The most typical Bukharan Jewish dish is oshi sabo (also osh savo or osovoh), a "meal in a pot" slowly cooked overnight and eaten hot for Shabbat lunch. Oshi sabo is made with meat, rice, vegetables, and fruit added for a unique sweet and sour taste. By virtue of its culinary function (a hot Shabbat meal in Jewish homes) and ingredients (rice, meat, vegetables cooked together overnight), oshi sabo is a Bukharan version of cholent or hamin.

In addition to oshi sabo, authentic Bukharian Jewish dishes include the following dishes.

== Meat dishes ==
- Osh palov – a Bukharian Jewish version of palov for weekdays, includes both beef and chicken.
- Bakhsh – "green palov", rice with meat or chicken and green herbs (coriander, parsley, dill), exists in two varieties; bakhshi khaltagi cooked Jewish-style in a small bag immersed in a pot with boiling water or soup and bakhshi degi cooked like regular palov in a cauldron; bakhshi khaltagi is precooked and therefore can be served on Shabbat.
- Khalta savo – food cooked in a bag (usually rice and meat, possibly with the addition of dried fruit).
- Osh savo – rice cooked with meat and vegetables such as red pepper, tomato, and zucchini, and usually cooked on Friday night through Saturday morning in the oven.
- Yakhni – a dish consisting of two kinds of boiled meat (beef and chicken), brought whole to the table and sliced before serving with a little broth and a garnish of boiled vegetables; a main course for Friday night dinner.
- Kov roghan – fried pieces of chicken with fried potatoes piled on top.

== Rice dishes ==
- Serkaniz (sirkoniz) – garlic rice dish, another variation of palov.
- Oshi piyozi – stuffed onion.
- Shulah – a Bukharian-style risotto.

== Vegetable dishes ==
- Boyjon – eggplant puree mixed only with salt and garlic, the traditional starter for the Friday-night meal in Bukharan Jewish homes.
- Slotah Bukhori – a salad made with tomato, cucumber, green onion, cilantro, salt, pepper, and lemon juice. Some also put in lettuce and chili pepper.

== Bread dishes ==
- Noni toki – a crispy flatbread baked on the back of a wok. This method creates a bowl-shaped bread.

== Fish dishes ==
- Fried fish with garlic sauce (for Friday night dinner): "Every Bukharian Sabbath ... is greeted with a dish of fried fish covered with a pounded sauce of garlic and cilantro." In the Bukharan dialect, the dish is called mai birion or in full mai birion ovi sir, where mai birion is fried fish and ovi sir is garlic sauce (literally "garlic water"). Bread is sometimes fried and then dipped in the remaining garlic water and is called noni-sir.

== See also ==
- Israeli cuisine
- Jewish cuisine
- Mizrahi Jewish cuisine
- Sephardi Jewish cuisine
