= Fatoot samneh =

Israeli fried pita and egg dish

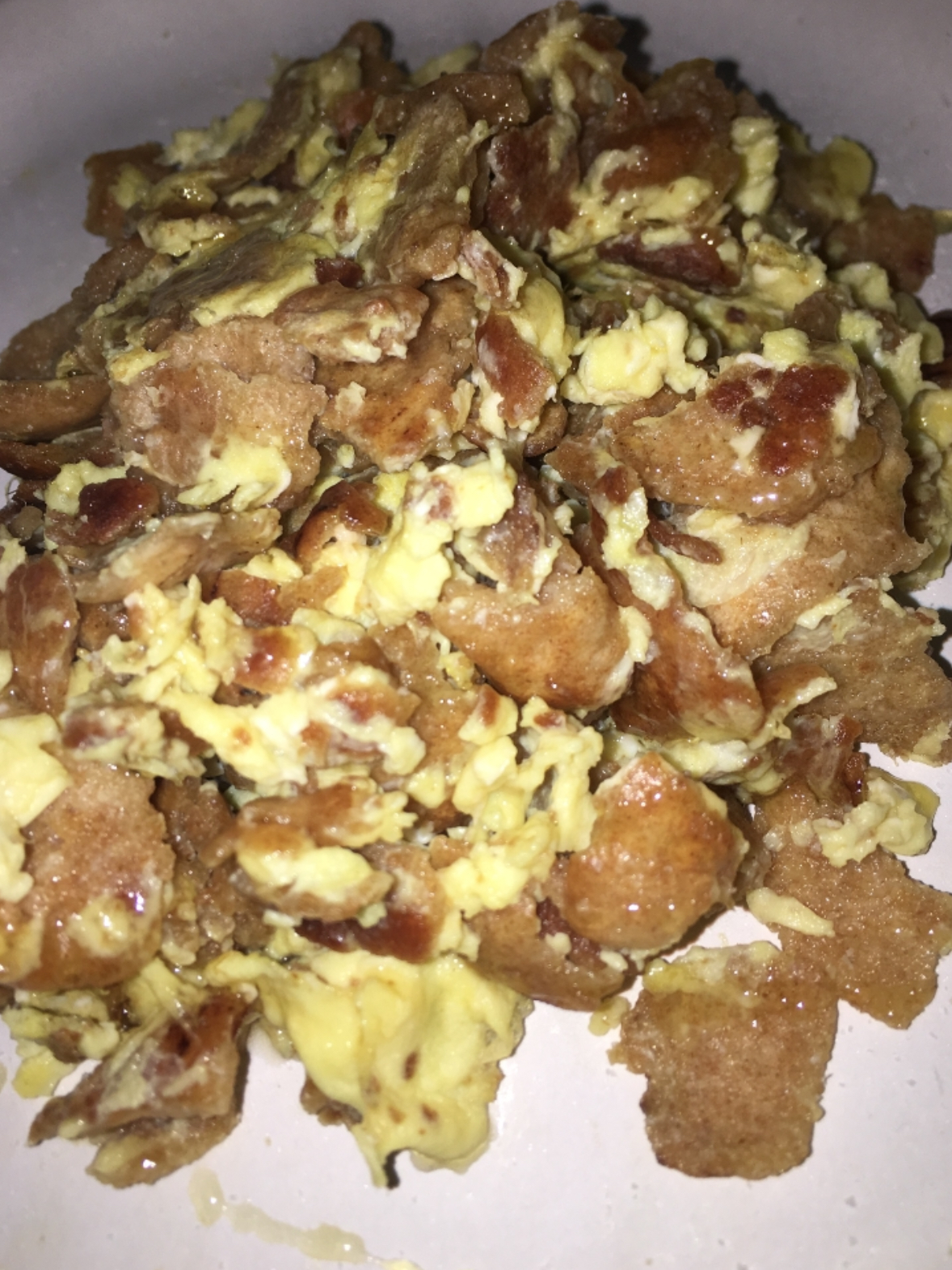
- Fatoot samneh, as traditionally served by Yemenite Jews, topped with honey
- Type: Fried pita and scrambled egg dish
- Place of origin: Yemen
- Serving temperature: Breakfast, or dinner
- Main ingredients: Pita or other flatbread, clarified butter (samneh), or butter, or schmaltz, beaten egg, kosher salt, honey

Fatoot samneh (Hebrew: פטאוט סמנה) is a dish originating in Yemeni cuisine, consisting of pieces of saluf or malawach (Yemeni flatbreads), or pita, that have been fried in clarified butter and combined with beaten egg. It is commonly served as a breakfast or dinner dish. It was brought to Israel by Yemenite Jews. It is somewhat similar to the Jewish matzah brei or the Mexican-American migas, which are made with matzo, and corn tortillas, respectively, although fatoot samneh is made with pita bread.

== Origins ==
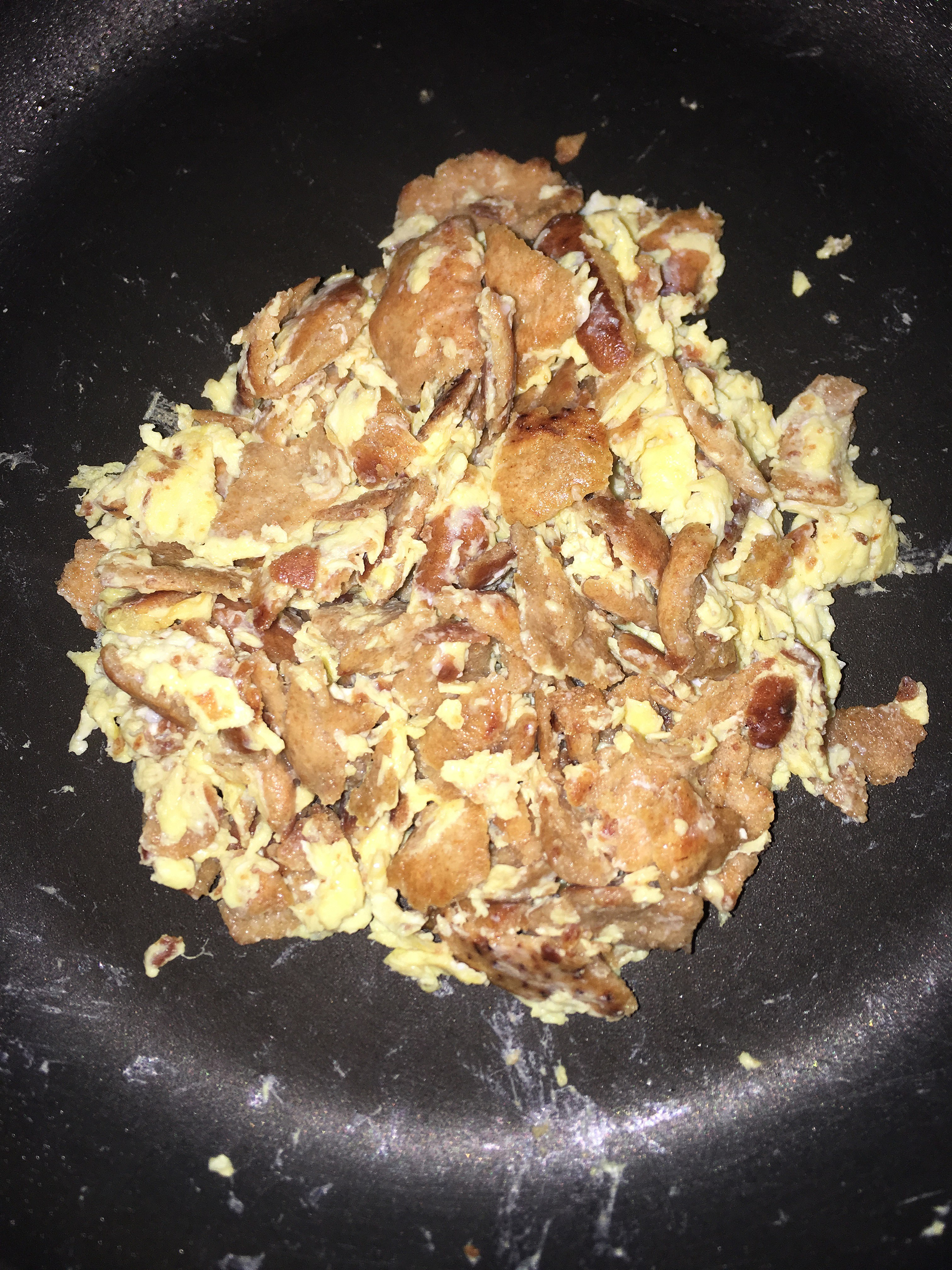
Fatoot samneh

Fatoot samneh originated as a way for the Yemenite Jewish community to use and repurpose stale pita bread that would have otherwise been discarded. The Yemenite Jewish community was historically very poor, and most of their meals consisted of various soups and stews. Bread such as pita was very valuable, as was samneh, or clarified butter, and their families were often large, with women of the community traditionally having to make do and cook as many meals as possible from their limited resources to feed their families. Over time fatoot samneh became a popular and traditional dish among the Yemenite Jews as both a way to use up stale pita bread that was past its prime, as well as a popular breakfast or dinner dish.

== Overview ==
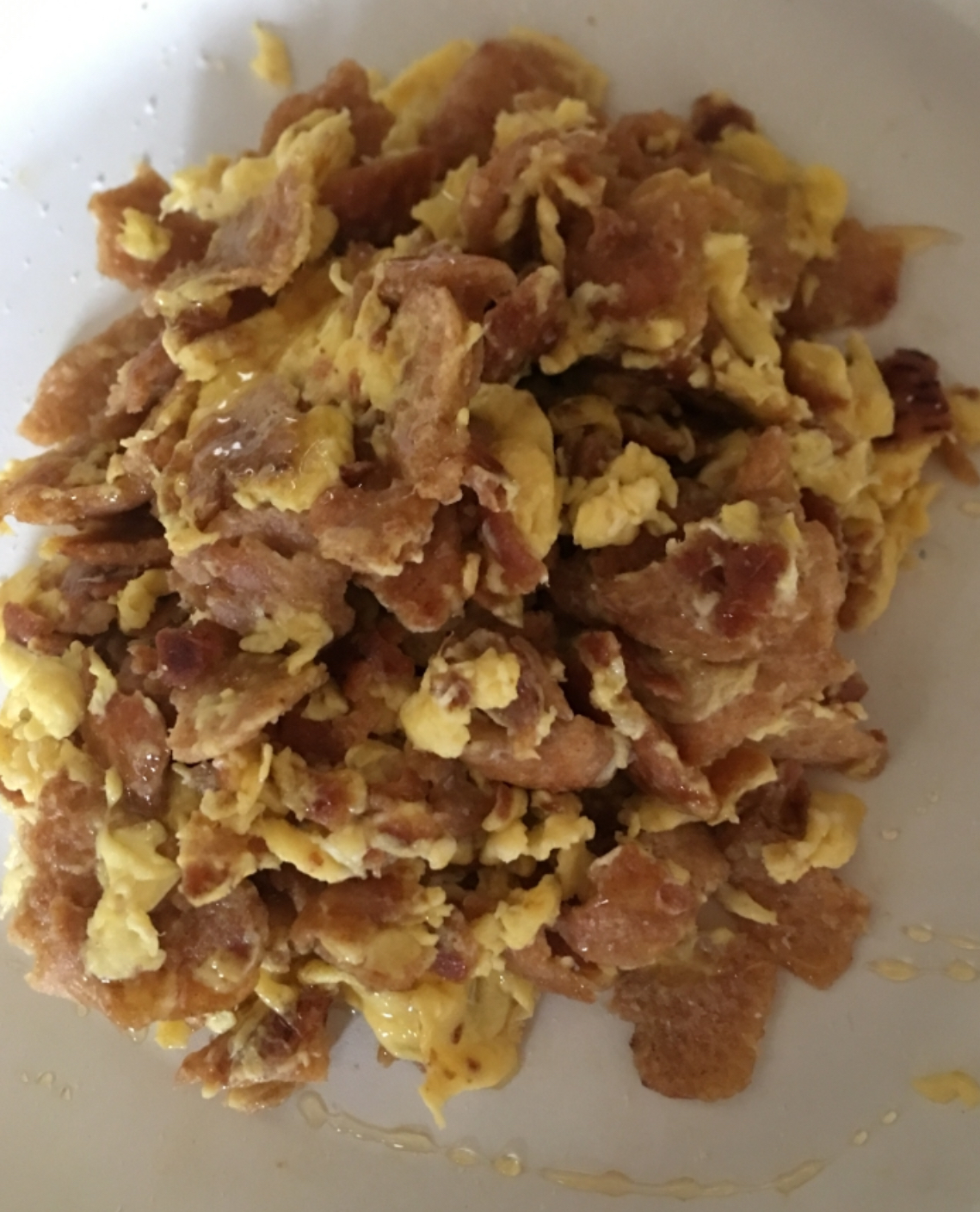
Fatoot samneh drizzled with honey

Fatoot samneh consists of pita bread or some other flatbread such as saluf, laffa, or malawach, that was often leftover from another use or stale, and has been torn or cut into pieces and fried until crisp in a large amount of samneh (clarified butter), although butter or chicken schmaltz are also sometimes used. The mixture is combined with beaten/scrambled eggs, and cooked together in a manner similar to matzah brei or migas. In Israel it is traditionally topped with honey as a sweet dish, although savory versions also exist and some top it with labneh, tahini, zhug, resek avganiyot (grated tomatoes), among other toppings. Fatoot samneh has been compared by some to various dishes such as matzo brei, and migas, among others.

== Preparation ==
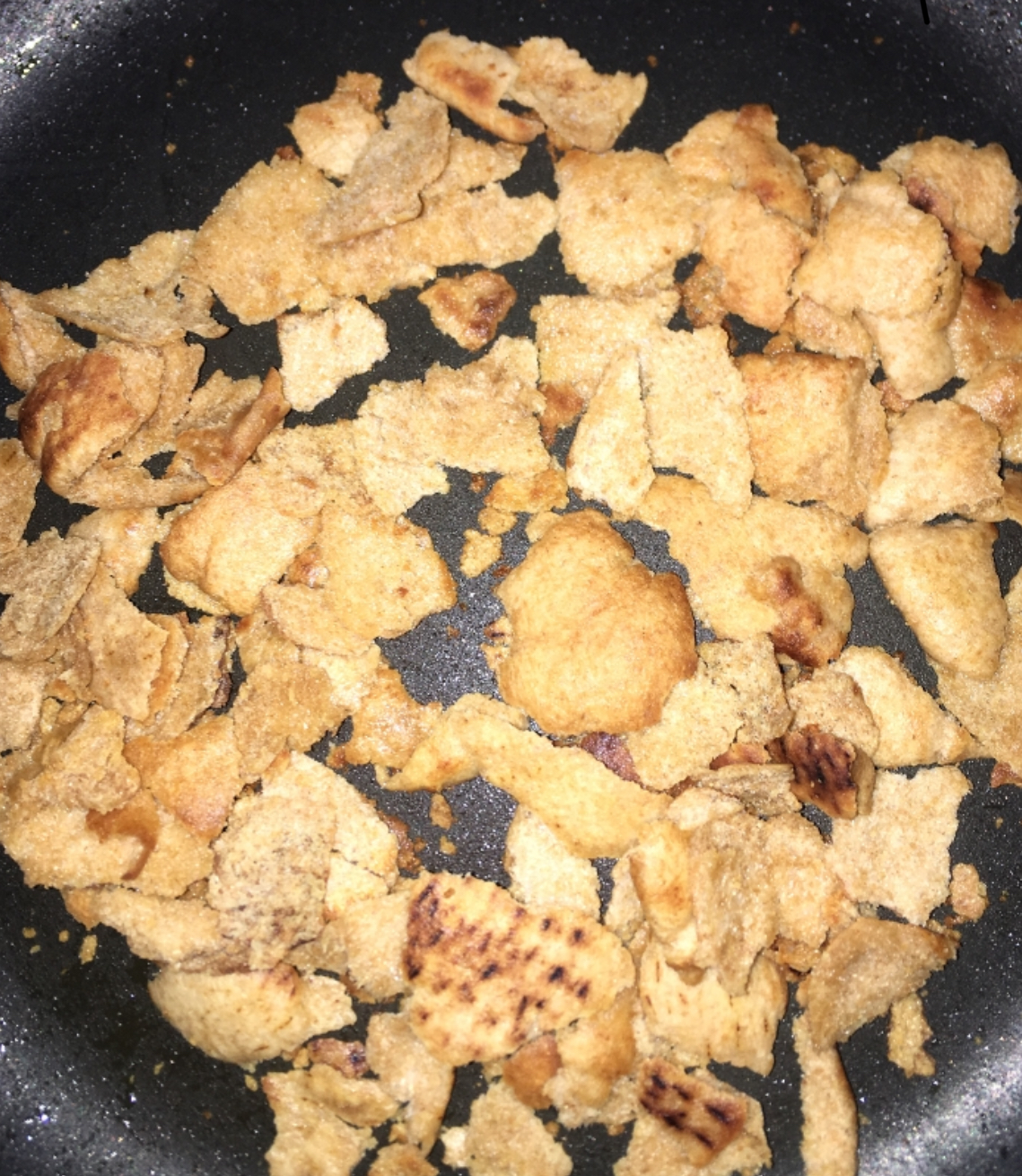
Pita pieces frying in butter for fatoot samneh

Fatoot samneh is typically made in the following manner. Stale flatbread is torn into small pieces and fried in a large amount of hot clarified butter, butter (for milchig/dairy variations), or schmaltz (for fleishig/meat variations, until the pita pieces are toasted and become crispy). Several eggs are heated with kosher salt, and added to the fried pita mixture, which is stirred continuously similar to scrambled eggs, until the eggs are set and have been somewhat absorbed by the pita. Once the fatoot samneh is cooked through it is then topped with honey, silan, or a range of other toppings, condiments, and seasonings.
