= Chraime =

Spicy fish stew from Maghrebi cuisine

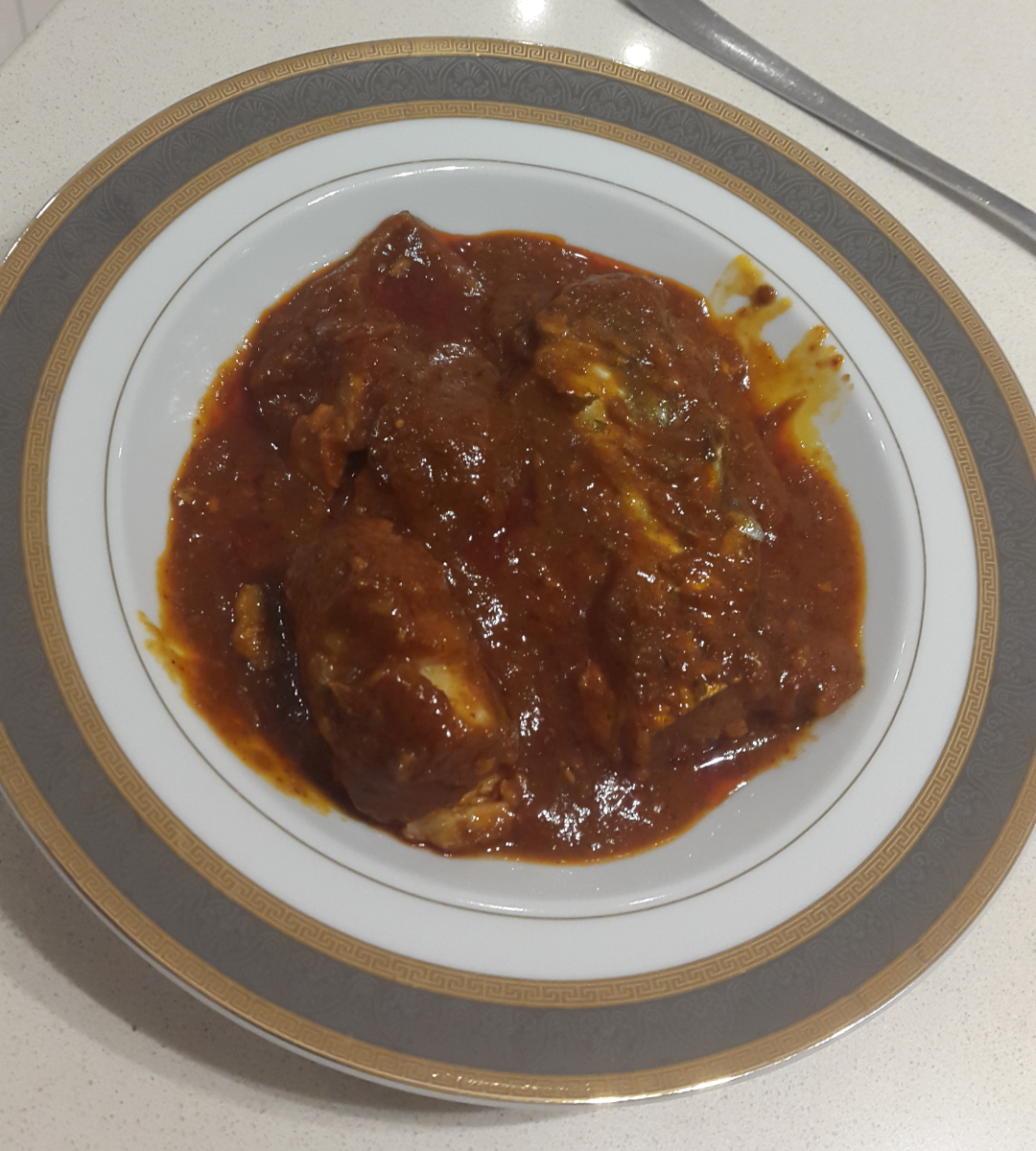
Chraime

Chraime (Hebrew: חריימה, Arabic: حرايمي haraime) is a spicy fish stew with tomatoes from North Africa. The name of the dish comes from the Arabic word for "hot".

Chraime is traditionally eaten by Jews on Erev Shabbat as well as on Rosh Hashanah and Passover for the Seder. Libyan-Jewish immigrants have popularized the dish in Israel.

== See also ==
- Jewish cuisine
- Arab cuisine
- Harira
- Cuisine of the Mizrahi Jews
- Cuisine of the Sephardic Jews
