= Palov =

Palov may refer to:

- Květoslav Palov (born 1962), Czech-Australian cyclist
- Pilaf, also called palov, a rice dish
- Uzbek plov, also called palov, an Uzbek rice dish
