= Mizrahi Jewish cuisine =

Cooking traditions of Mizrahi Jews

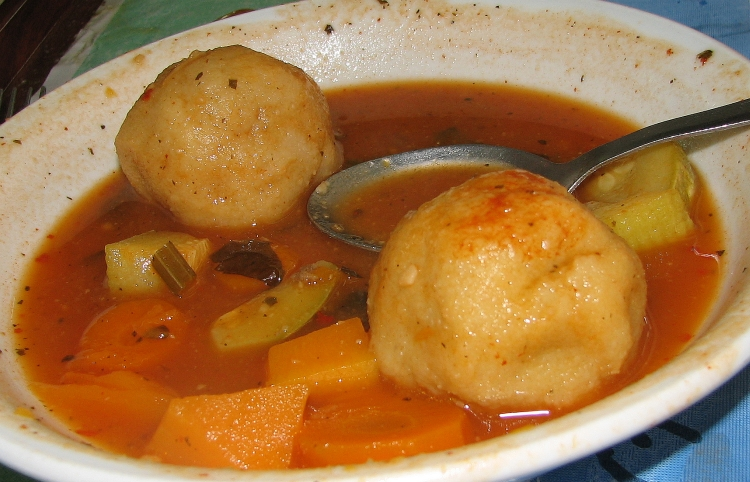
Iraqi-Jewish cuisine, kubbeh matfuniya

Mizrahi Jewish cuisine is an assortment of cooking traditions that developed among the Mizrahi Jewish communities of the Middle East, North Africa and Central Asia. Influenced by the diverse local culinary practices of countries such as Morocco, Libya, Egypt, Iraq, Iran, Yemen, and Syria, Mizrahi cuisine prominently features rice, legumes, meats (especially lamb and chicken), and an array of spices such as cumin, turmeric, and coriander. Signature dishes include kubbeh (dumplings), pilafs, grilled meats, and stews like hamin.

Jews of the Mizrahi communities cook foods that were and are popular in their host countries, while following the laws of kashrut. Many dishes go back thousands of years, while others were brought in from their host countries and/or altered to varying degrees. The cuisine is based largely on fresh ingredients, as marketing was done in the local souq.

Meat is ritually slaughtered in the shechita process, and is soaked and salted. Meat dishes are a prominent feature of Shabbat, festival, and celebratory meals. Cooked, stuffed and baked vegetables are central to the cuisine, as are various kinds of beans, chickpeas, lentils and burghul (cracked wheat). Rice takes the place of potatoes.

== History ==
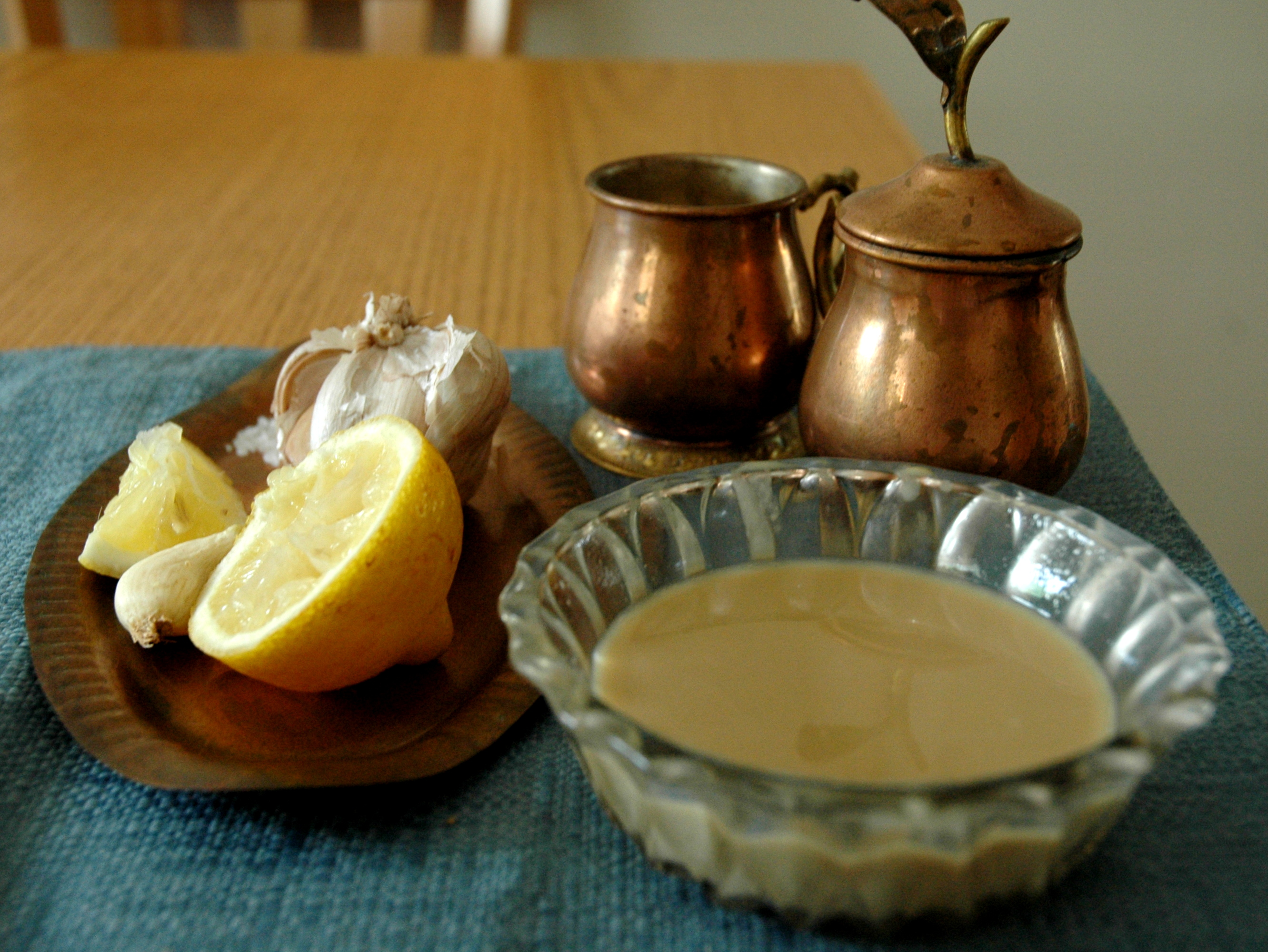
Tahina with lemon and garlic, a staple of Mizrahi Jewish cuisine as a dip or cooking sauce

Mizrahi Jews are the Jews of the Middle East, and points south and east, largely along the Mediterranean coastal areas and the Levant. In some countries, there was much mixing of populations after 1492 when the Jews were expelled from Spain.

Cuisine of the Mizrahi Jews includes the cuisines of the Jews of Iraq, Syria, Lebanon, Yemen, Iran (Persia), Afghanistan, Egypt, the Berber communities, Kurdistan, Eastern Caucasus and Georgia.

Some of these communities and cuisine styles overlap with Sephardic communities who fled to many Eastern, Middle-Eastern, and North African countries after the Spanish expulsion.

Coming from the Mediterranean, especially Israel in the past centuries, and "sunny" climes, Mizrahi cuisine is often light, with an emphasis on salads, stuffed vegetables and vine leaves, olive oil, lentils, fresh and dried fruits, herbs and nuts, and chickpeas.

Meat dishes often make use of lamb or ground beef. Fresh lemon juice is added to many soups and sauces. Many meat and rice dishes incorporate dried fruits such as apricots, prunes and raisins. Pine nuts are used as a garnish. Pomegranate juice is a staple of Persian-Jewish cooking.

Kubbeh, a meat-stuffed bulgur dumpling, features in the cooking of many Mizrahi communities. It is served in the cooking broth, as a kind of soup.

== Breads ==
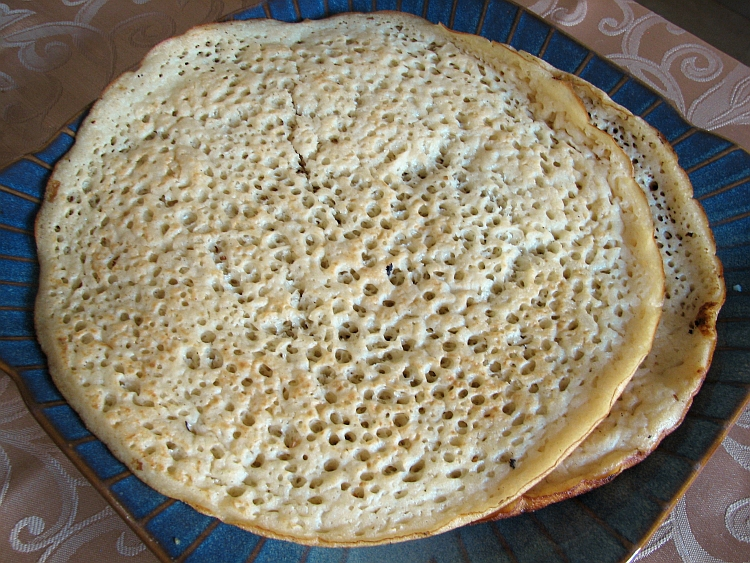
Lahoh, a spongy, pancake-like bread that originated from Somalia and the Horn of Africa

Flatbreads of many varieties are central to middle eastern cooking. Various flatbreads such as pitas, laffa, malawah, and lavash are used instead of challah, which was only used by Ashkenazim of Europe, and in the Turban-shaped variety by Moroccan Jews. Lahoh is a flatbread of the Yemenite Jews with a spongy texture.

== Herbs, spices and seasoning blends ==
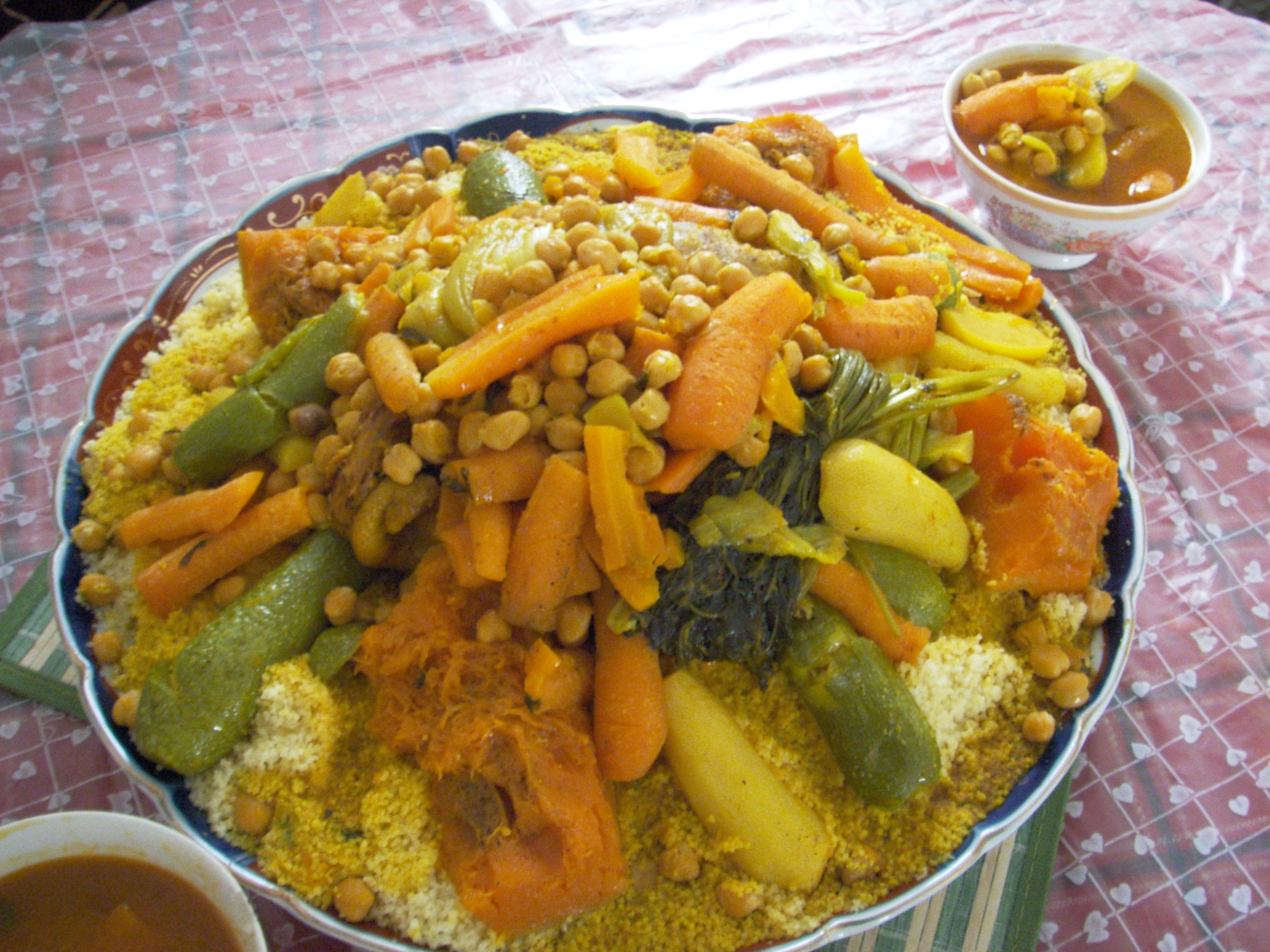
Couscous with vegetables and chickpeas

Mizrahi cuisine makes liberal use of cumin, pepper, sesame seeds, and various spices common to all Middle-Eastern cuisines. Saffron, a staple of Sephardic cuisine, is also featured in certain Mizrahi dishes.

Many foods are flavored with seasoning blends or pastes, and light sauces. Hilbah, a paste made from fenugreek seeds and hot pepper, is added to soups and other traditional Yemenite dishes. Skhug, a hot pepper sauce, comes in red and green varieties. A diluted version of skhug is spooned over falafel. Hawaij is a Yemenite spice mixture that comes into two varieties. One, a blend of powdered ginger, cinnamon, cloves and cardamom, is added to coffee and baked goods. The other, a blend of turmeric, black pepper, onion, cumin, cardamom and cloves, is added to soup.

Pastes and sauces are very often served on the side in small dishes on the table during meals, to be added by each diner as desired. Certain spice combinations are characteristic of particular countries, such as coriander and cumin in Egyptian cuisine.

The souqs of the Middle East and North Africa sell ready-made spice blends sold in bulk, but traditionally, Mizrahi Jews bought fresh herbs and prepared their own blends at home to maintain kashrut, fearing insects in the blends sold in the open-air bazaar.

- Adeni hawaij (Aden)—cumin, coriander, black pepper
- Adeni black tea spice (Aden)—cardamom, cinnamon, cloves
- Advieh-e halegh, halegh (charoset) (Iran)—may contain: cinnamon, cloves, ginger, nutmeg, and cardamom (optional)
- Hawaij (Yemen)—black pepper, cardamom, turmeric, saffron
- Kama (Morocco)—black pepper, cumin, ginger, turmeric, nutmeg
- Quatre épices or four spices (Egypt)—cinnamon, nutmeg, allspice, cloves
- Za'tar or zahtar—za'atar, thyme or hyssop with ground sesame seeds, sumac and salt

== Pickles and condiments ==
Olives and pickled vegetables, such as cucumbers, carrots, cabbage and cauliflower, are a standard accompaniment to meals. Amba is a pickled mango sauce. Small pickled lemons are a Tunisian and Moroccan delicacy.

== Desserts ==
Hot sahlab, a liquidy cornstarch pudding originally flavored with orchid powder (today invariably replaced by artificial flavorings), is served in cups as a winter drink, garnished with cinnamon, nuts, coconut and raisins. Arak from the anis drinks family, is the preferred alcoholic beverage. Rosewater is a common ingredient in cakes and desserts. Malabi, a cold cornstarch pudding, is sprinkled with rosewater and red syrup.

Ikaddaif or kadaif is a very sweet pastry similar in style and technique to baklavah. It consists of shredded dough, which is wrapped around crushed nuts, baked and then soaked in syrup. It is common in various parts of the Middle East and is served at festive meals.

== Cooking techniques ==
As cooking on Shabbat is prohibited for religious Jews, Mizrahi Jews take advantage of slow-cooking techniques, such as baking on a low temperature overnight, to have available hot dishes on the Sabbath. This technique is virtually universal to all Jewish cuisines. One staple of this technique is hamin or chamin (from the word kham, which means "hot").

In North Africa this dish is known as dafina. There are many varieties of hamin and dafina, as particularly local spices and ingredients are used, as well as the method of preparation. Some varieties are denser than others, and some use rice as a staple instead of the common root vegetables.

Bourekas are often served on Shabbat morning. In Yemenite cooking, Shabbat dishes include jachnun and kubbanah.

== Shabbat and holiday cooking ==
=== Shabbat ===
Shabbat foods are often slow-cooked prior to Shabbat, and kept warm overnight once cooked, as cooking is forbidden on Shabbat by Jewish law. In Yemenite cooking, Shabbat dishes include jachnun and kubaneh. Mafrum is a stuffed vegetable dish traditionally eaten by Libyan Jews on Shabbat.

On Shabbat, the Jews of North Africa in Tunisia and Morocco serve chreime, fish in a spicy tomato sauce.

=== Passover ===
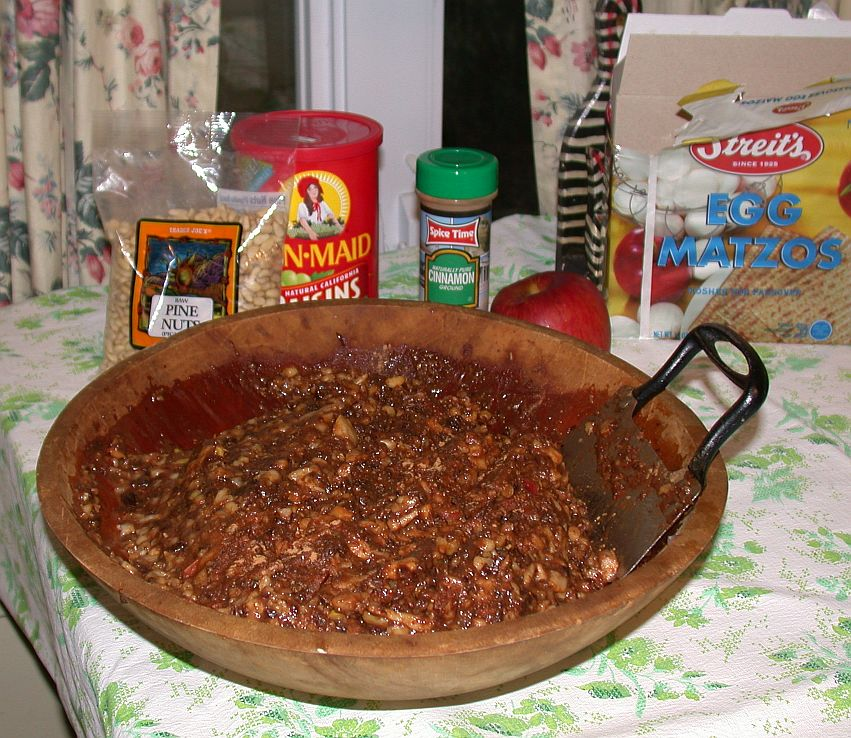
Charoset

Mizrahi cuisine allows the use of kitniyot, which is forbidden amongst the Ashkenazim. Kitniyot are legumes and some grains, which include rice and a variety of beans and pulses.

Whereas charoset in Ashkenazi homes is a blend of chopped apples and nuts spiced with wine and cinnamon, Mizrahi charoset is often based on dried fruits, especially dates, and is much thicker in consistency.

Other Mizrahi Jewish dishes are tebit, a chicken and rice dish, and ingriyi, sweet and sour meat topped with aubergines (eggplant), both from the cuisine of Iraqi Jews.

=== Rosh Hashanah ===
Makroudh are pastries stuffed with spiced dates and scented with orange-flower water prepared for Rosh Hashanah by Algerian Jews.

Slow-cooked vegetables stuffed with meat are a popular holiday dish. Moroccan Jews season the stuffing with cinnamon, turmeric, and nutmeg. Holiday meals start with at least a dozen small salads.

=== Yom Kippur ===
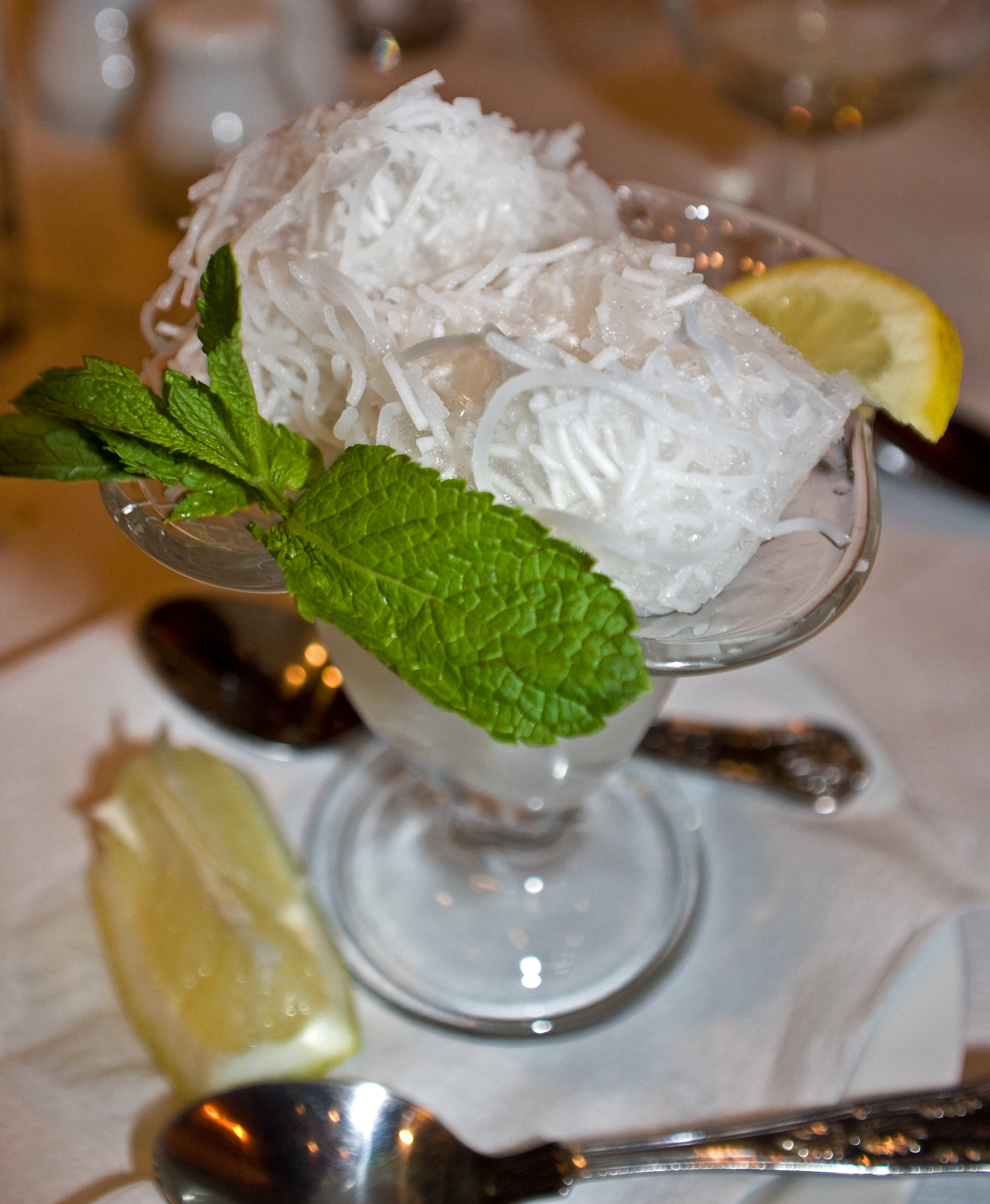
Faloodeh

Customs for the first food eaten after the Yom Kippur fast differ. Iranian Jews often eat a mixture of shredded apples mixed with rose water called faloodeh seeb. Syrian and Iraqi Jews eat round sesame crackers that look like mini-bagels. Turkish and Greek Jews sip a sweet drink made from melon seeds.

== Special dishes ==
- Couscous—small steamed balls of crushed durum wheat semolina traditionally served with stew spooned on top
- Falafel—a deep-fried ball or patty-shaped fritter made from ground chickpeas, fava beans, or both
- Ful—a stew of cooked fava beans served with vegetable oil, cumin, and optionally with chopped parsley, garlic, onion, lemon juice, chili pepper and other vegetable, herb and spice ingredients
- Halvah—a sweet sesame-based confection
- Hummus—a Middle-Eastern dip, spread, or savory dish made from cooked, mashed chickpeas blended with tahini, lemon juice, and garlic
- Ka'abur—Tunisian-Jewish potato patties made with chicken, bread, and spices
- Kibbeh—dishes usually made by pounding bulgur wheat together with meat into a fine paste and forming it into balls with toasted pine nuts and spices
- Ma'amoul—shortbread pastries filled with dates or nuts
- Matbucha—cooked tomatoes and roasted bell peppers seasoned with garlic and chili pepper
- Moroccan cigars—ground beef wrapped in dough
- Sabich—a sandwich of pita or laffa bread stuffed with fried eggplant, hard-boiled eggs, salat katzutz, parsley, amba and tahini
- Shakshuka—eggs poached in a sauce of tomatoes, olive oil, peppers, onion and garlic, commonly spiced with cumin, paprika, cayenne pepper, and nutmeg

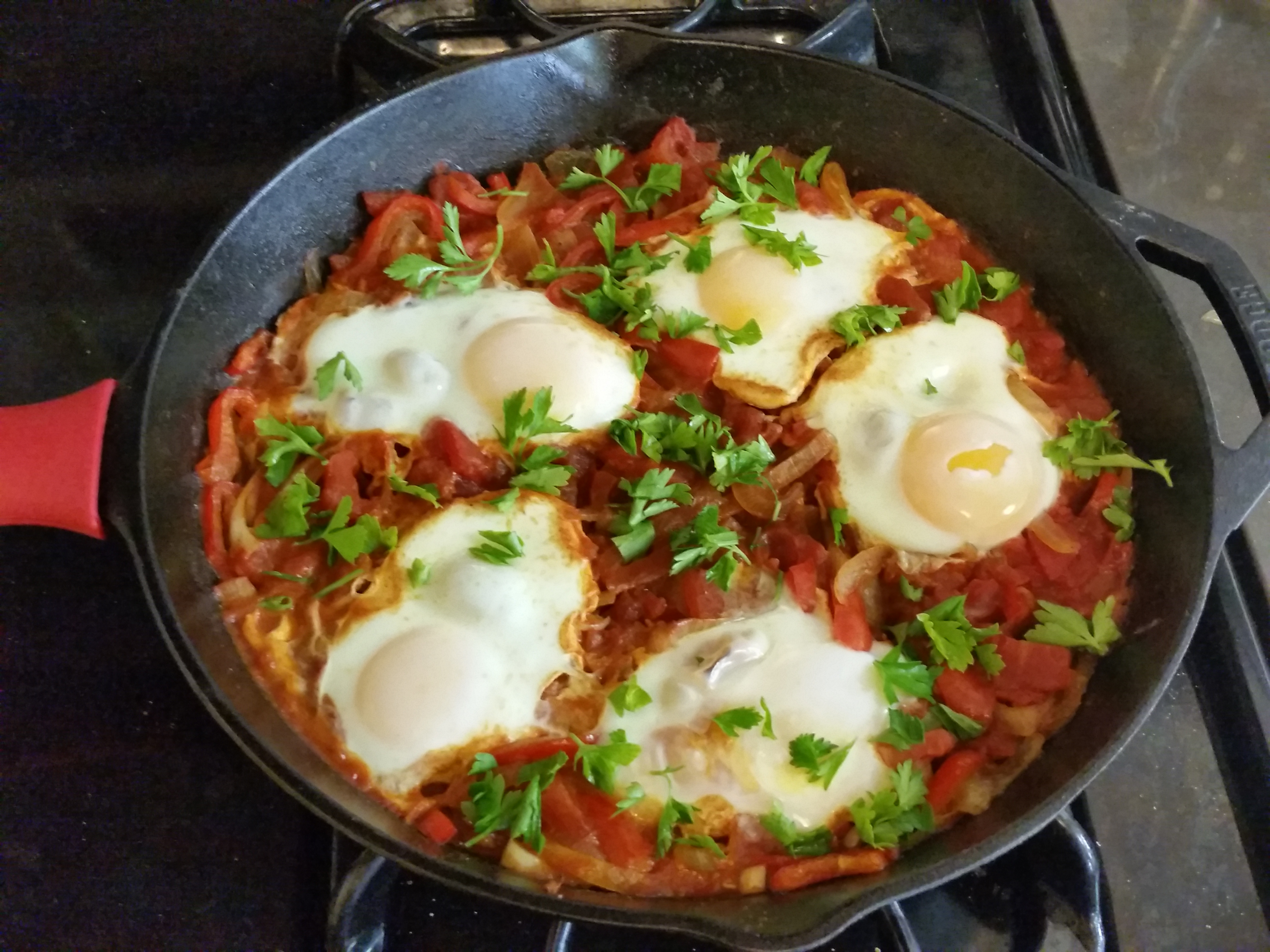
Shakshouka in a cast-iron pan

- Skhug—a hot sauce originating in Yemen
- Tabbouleh—vegetarian salad made mostly of finely chopped parsley, with tomatoes, mint, onion, bulgur, and seasoned with olive oil, lemon juice, salt and sweet pepper
- Tagine—a slow-cooked savory stew, typically made with sliced meat, poultry or fish together with vegetables or fruit
- Tunisian mulukhiyah—a thick beef stew

== Gallery ==
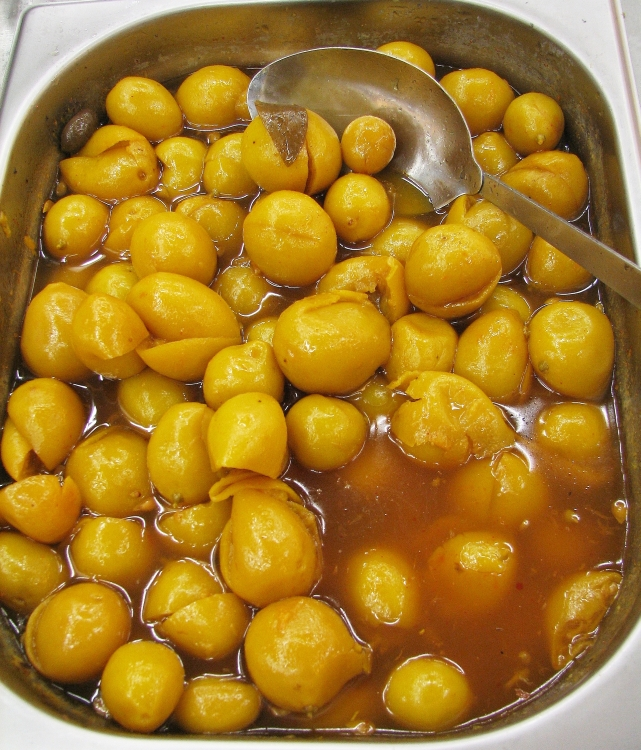
Moroccan pickled lemons

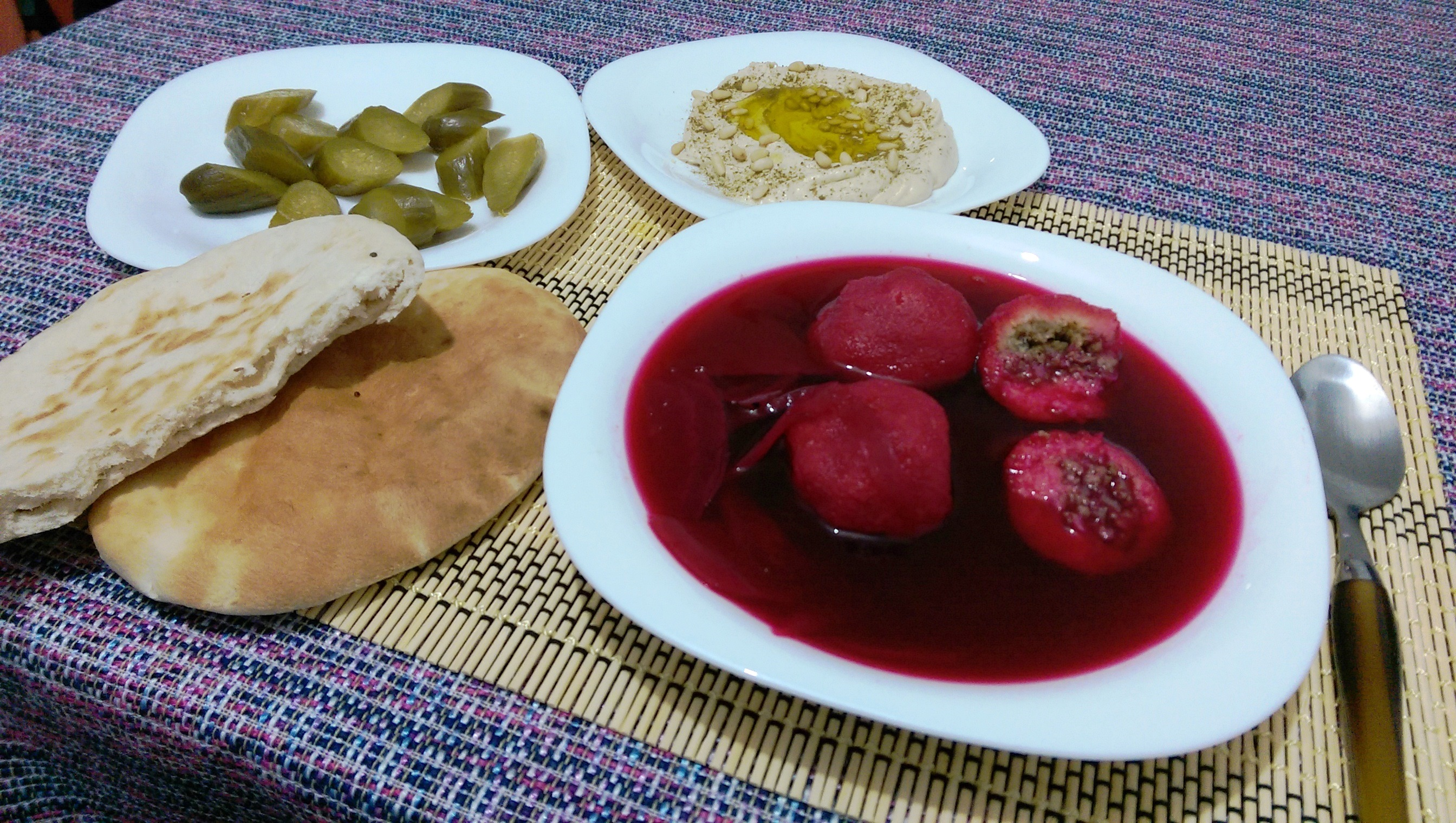
A bowl of kubbeh adom, or red kubbeh in a beet broth

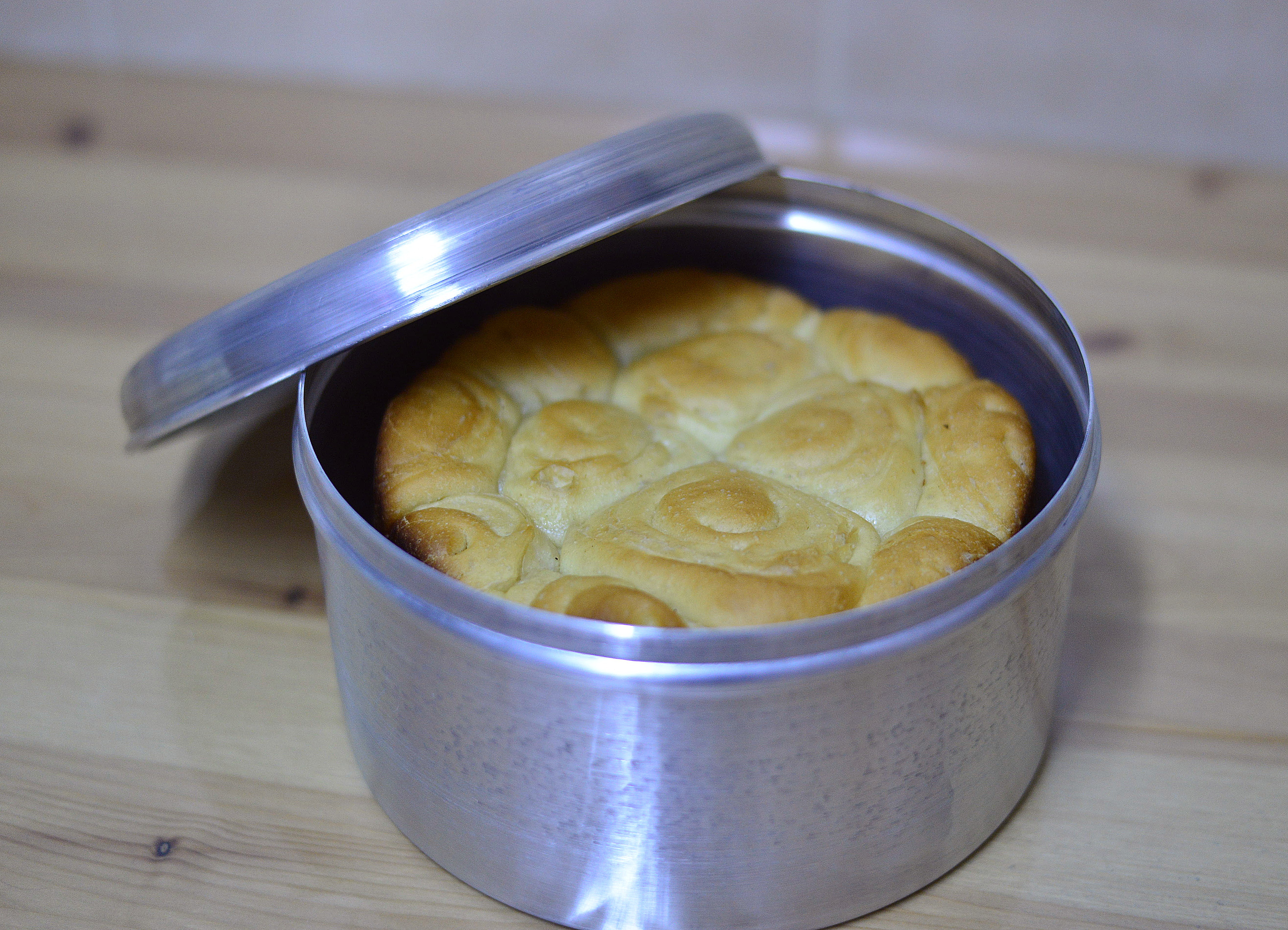
Kubaneh, traditional Yemenite Shabbat pull-apart bread

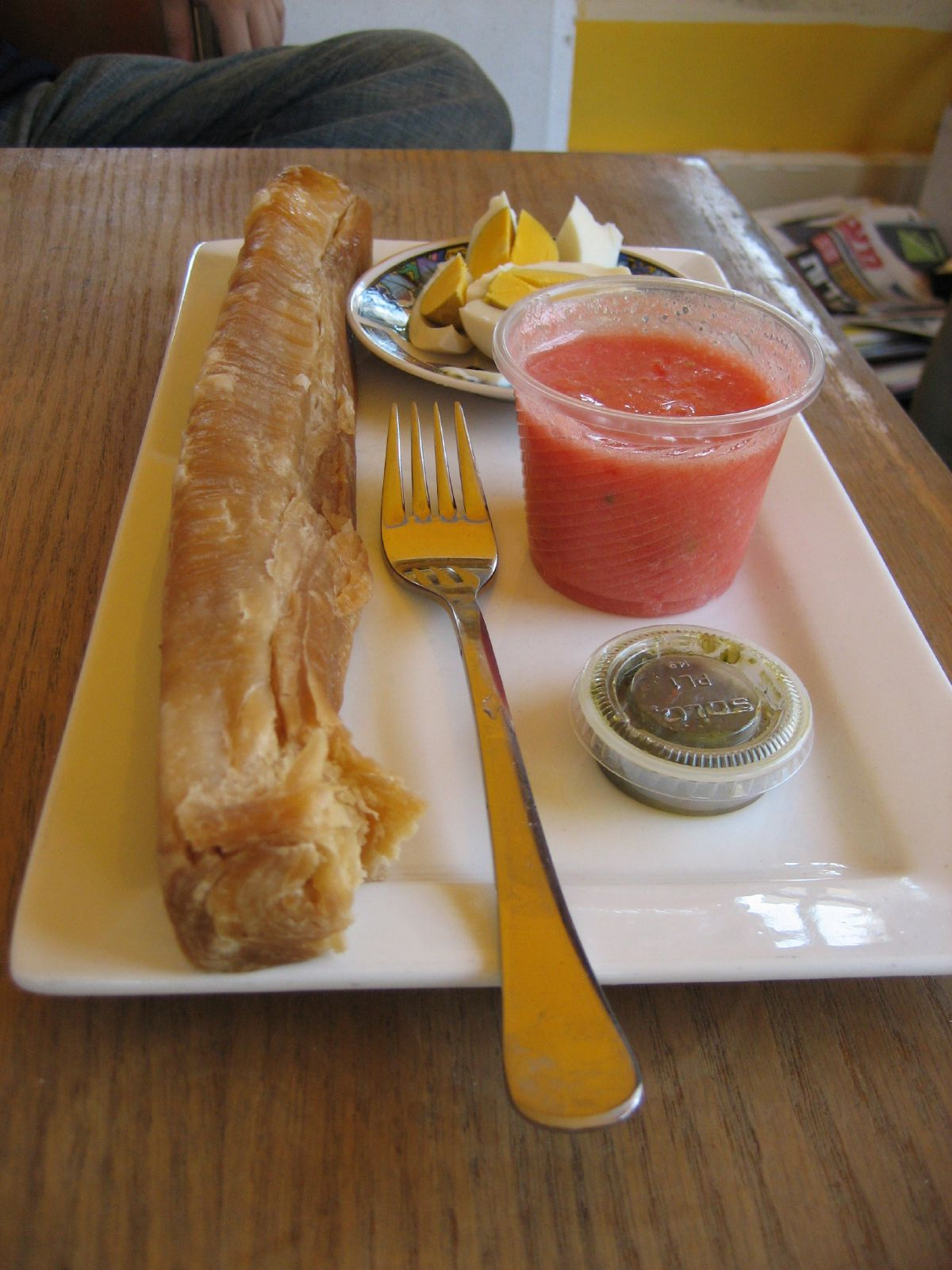
Jachnun served with oven-baked egg, fresh grated tomato and zhug

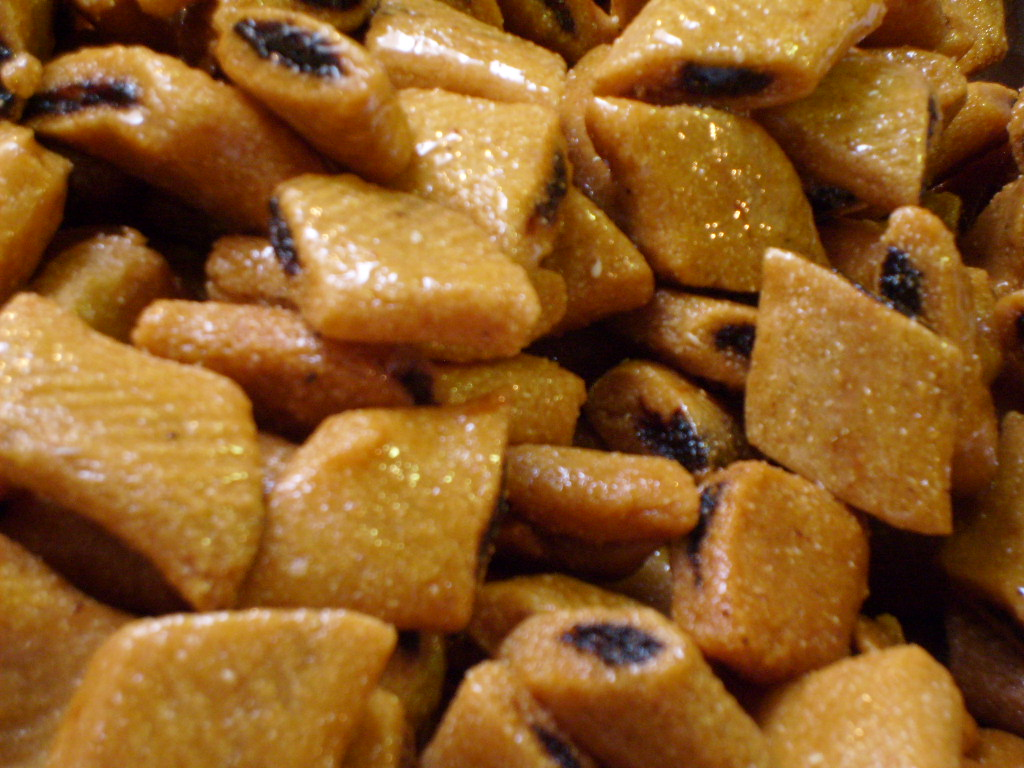
Makroudh covered in honey

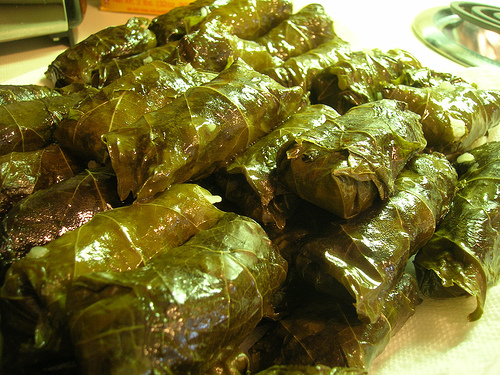
Yaprak stuffed vine leaves

== See also ==
- Jewish cuisine
- Cuisine of Israel
- Cuisine of the Ashkenazi Jews
- Cuisine of the Bukharan Jews
- Cuisine of the Ethiopian Jews
- Cuisine of the Sephardic Jews
- Cuisine of the Moroccan Jews
- Cuisine of the Syrian Jews
- Middle Eastern cuisine
- Maghrebi cuisine
