= Resek agvaniyot =

Israeli tomato condiment

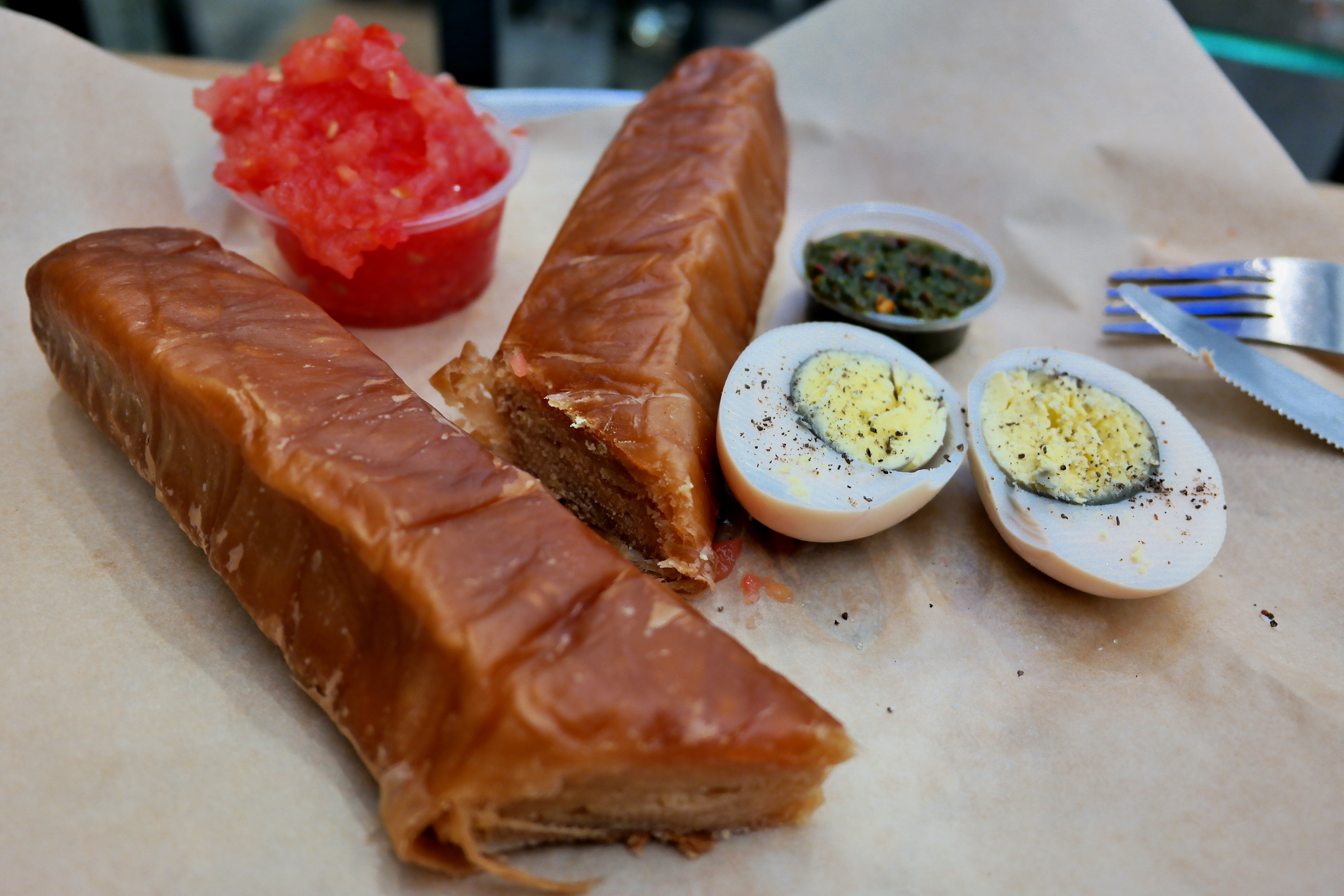
- Resek agvaniyot (upper left), as served with jachnun, zkhug, and a Hard-boiled egg
- Alternative names: Resek, grated tomato, grated tomatoes, Israeli tomato sauce
- Type: Condiment
- Place of origin: Israel or Yemen
- Created by: Yemenite Jews
- Main ingredients: Fresh tomatoes, kosher salt, black pepper; occasionally olive oil, garlic, parsley, cilantro, zhoug

Resek agvaniyot, or resek (Hebrew: רסק עגבניות or רסק, lit. 'tomato puree'), is an Israeli condiment made of grated tomatoes that is traditionally served with malawach, jachnun, bourekas, kubaneh, and other dishes. It is frequently paired with zhug, and is also commonly served as part of the Israeli breakfast.

== Origins ==
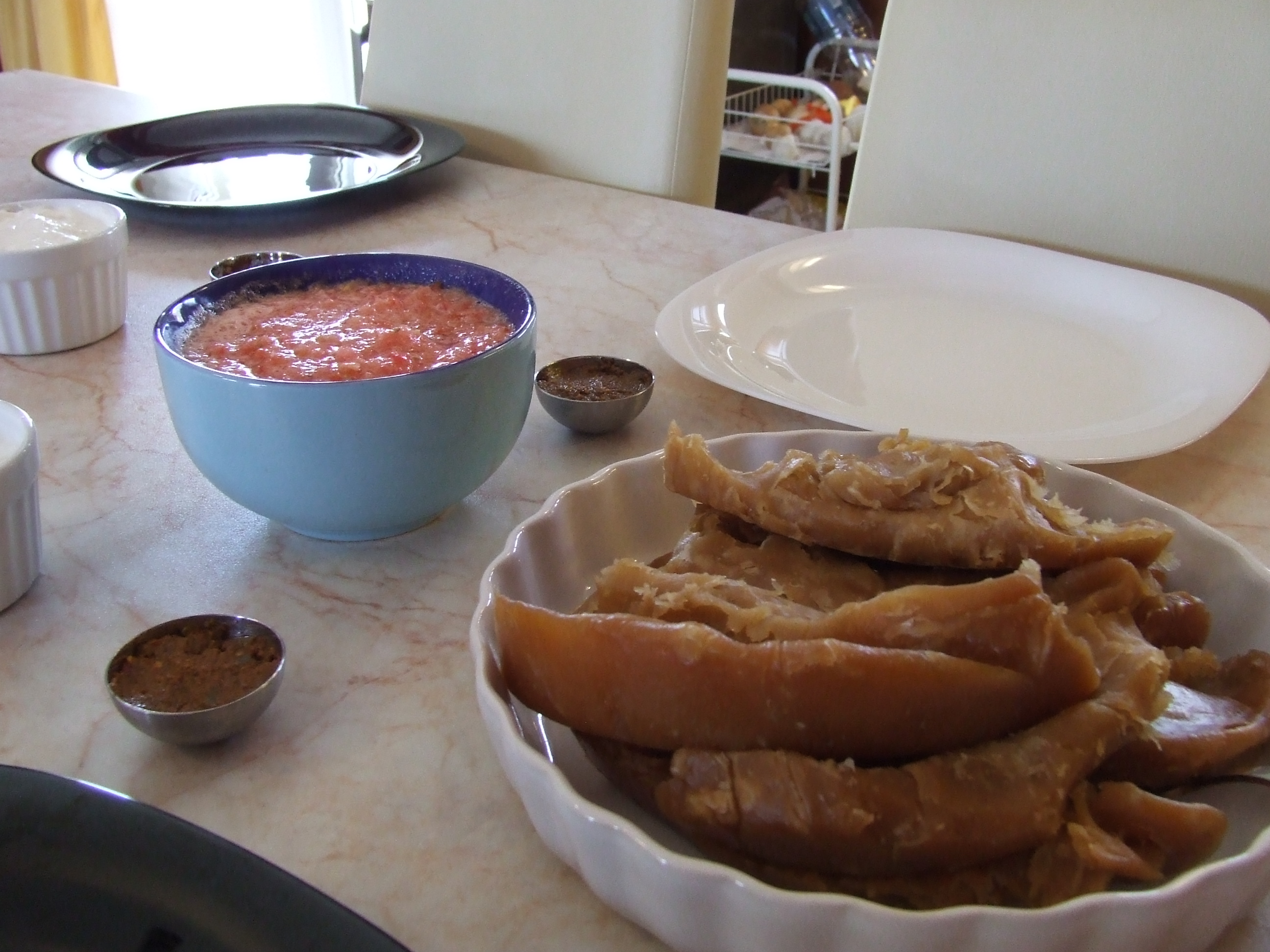
Resek agvaniyot served in a bowl as a condiment or dip

Resek agvaniyot originated in the Yemenite Jewish community several hundred years ago, following the introduction of tomatoes to their cuisine, and as part of their traditional Shabbat morning meals.

== Overview ==
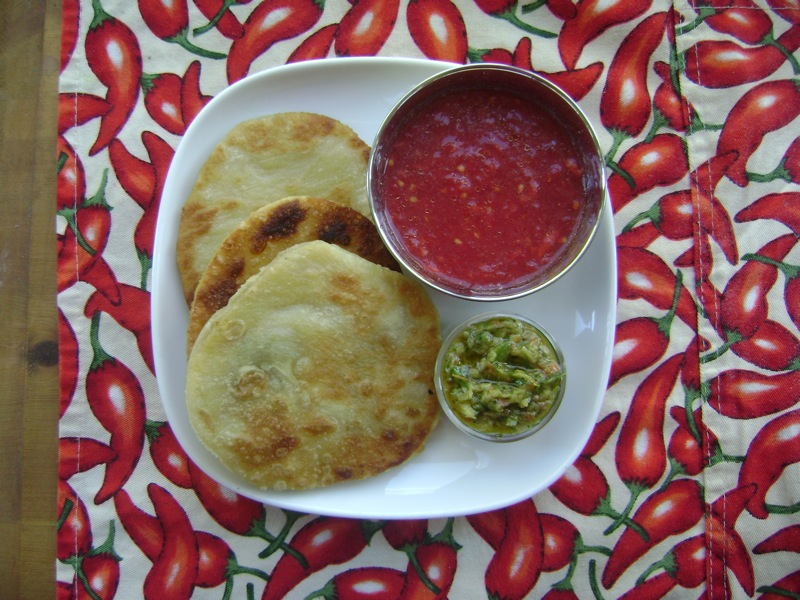
Resek agvaniyot served alongside zhoug with malawach

Resek agvaniyot is a condiment made of salted, grated raw tomatoes. It is somewhat similar to a salsa or a tomato puree, except it is never cooked and it always has a very fine, smooth consistency. Resek is a common condiment in Israel, and has been prepared by the Yemenite Jews for centuries, who traditionally pair it with zhoug and haminados (slow-cooked eggs) and serve it with kubaneh, malawach, and jachnun as part of their Shabbat morning breakfast. With the arrival of Yemenite Jews to Israel seeking refuge after a series of pogroms, and their later expulsion from Yemen; it has since become a popular dish across Israeli society. Resek is commonly paired with a number of other dishes in both Yemenite Jewish, and non-Yemenite dining establishments across the nation such as bourekas, challah, falafel and pita.

== Preparation ==
Resek agvaniyot is typically prepared by blanching fresh, whole tomatoes in boiling water then transferring them to an ice bath. The tomatoes are then peeled, and grated and seasoned with coarse/kosher salt. Sometimes olive oil, zhug or fresh herbs such as parsley, or cilantro are added as well

== See also ==
- Kubaneh
- Tomato paste
- Israeli cuisine
