= Jachnun =

Yemenite Jewish pastry

Gahnun
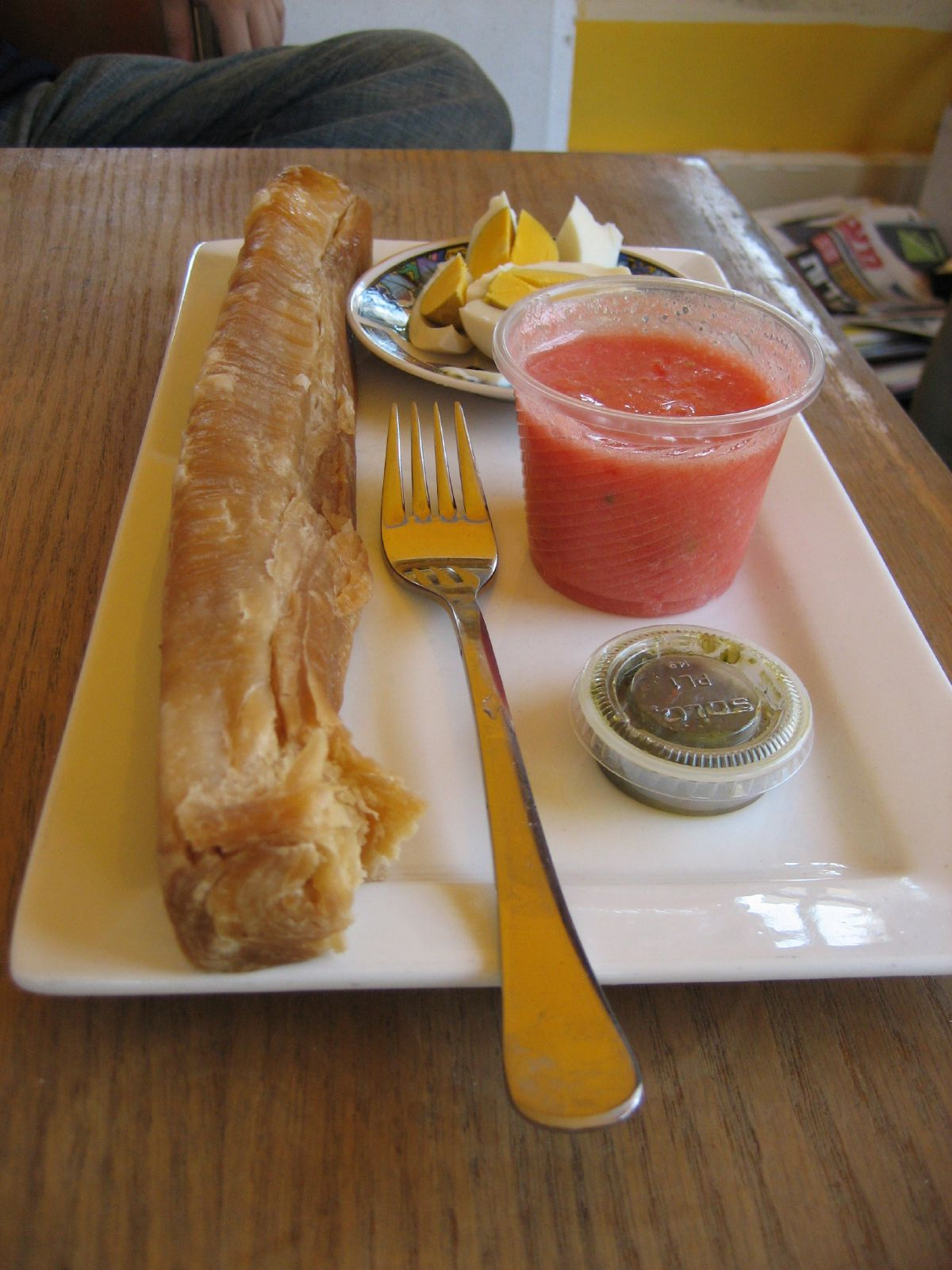
- Gahnun served with oven-baked egg, fresh grated tomato and zhug
- Type: Bread
- Place of origin: Yemen
- Region or state: Israel
- Created by: Adeni Jews
- Serving temperature: Hot

Gachnun or gahnun (Hebrew: גַחְנוּן, Hebrew pronunciation: ['d͡ʒaχnun], ['d͡ʒaħnun]) is a Jewish enriched bread, originating from the Adeni Jews, and traditionally served on Shabbat morning, with resek agvaniyot (a freshly grated tomato dip), hard-boiled eggs, and zhug (a type of spicy green herbal condiment).

With the flight of Yemeni Jews, Gachnun persists in Israeli cuisine, where it is served in homes (usually on Shabbat), as fast food at roadside stalls, and in restaurants, events, and dining halls.

== Preparation ==
Gahnun is prepared from enriched bread dough which is rolled out thinly and brushed with (traditionally) samneh, which is clarified butter spiced with 'hilbe' (fenugreek seeds) and aged in a smoked vessel, traditionally using smoke from the wood of a specific tree, the דודינה tree (presumably Dodonaea viscosa, sheth in Arabic), though regular clarified butter or shortening can be used. A little honey is sometimes added when the dough is rolled up before cooking.

It is traditionally cooked overnight on a 'Shabbat hotplate' at a very low temperature, starting the cooking process on the Friday (usually in the morning), to be taken out and eaten on Shabbat (Saturday) morning, as it is forbidden by Jewish custom to start cooking or turn electrical implements on/off during the Shabbat. The Gahnun pieces are baked/steamed in a lidded pot (trapping moisture and preventing drying and burning).

This cooking process turns the dough a dark amber, endowing it with a deep, sweet, caramelized taste. The dough used for Gachnun is the same as that used for malawach.

== History ==
The idea of slow-cooking food in a way that conforms with Shabbat restrictions is ancient, originating with cholent, or hamin, a slow-cooked stew that originated in ancient Israel. Gachnun and its pan-fried cousin malawach probably originated as variations of Sephardic Jewish puff pastry, brought to Yemen by Jews expelled from Spain, according to Gil Marks.

== See also ==
- Cholent
- Malawach
- Fatoot samneh
- Kubaneh
- Israeli cuisine
- Jewish cuisine
