= Uzbek plov =

Central Asian rice dish

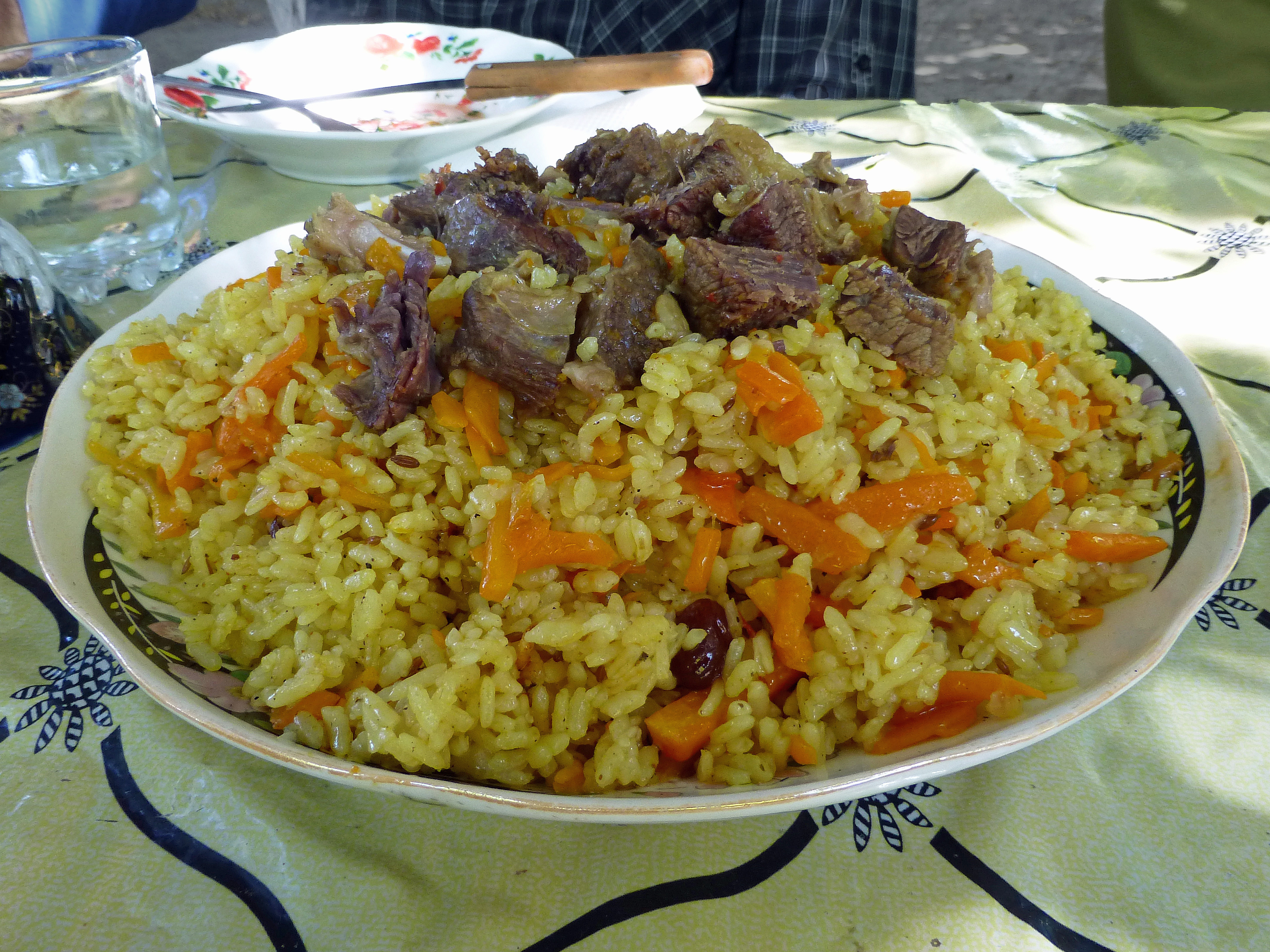
- A preparation of plov, the national dish of Uzbekistan
- Alternative names: Plov, osh, palov
- Type: Rice dish
- Place of origin: Uzbekistan
- Region or state: Central Asia
- Associated cuisine: Uzbek cuisine
- Serving temperature: Hot
- Main ingredients: Rice, lamb or beef, carrots, onions
- Ingredients generally used: Spices (cumin, coriander), garlic, oil
- Variations: Over 50 variations exist, some over 10 centuries old
- Similar dishes: Pilaf, biryani, Kabuli palaw

Palov culture and tradition
- UNESCO Intangible Cultural Heritage
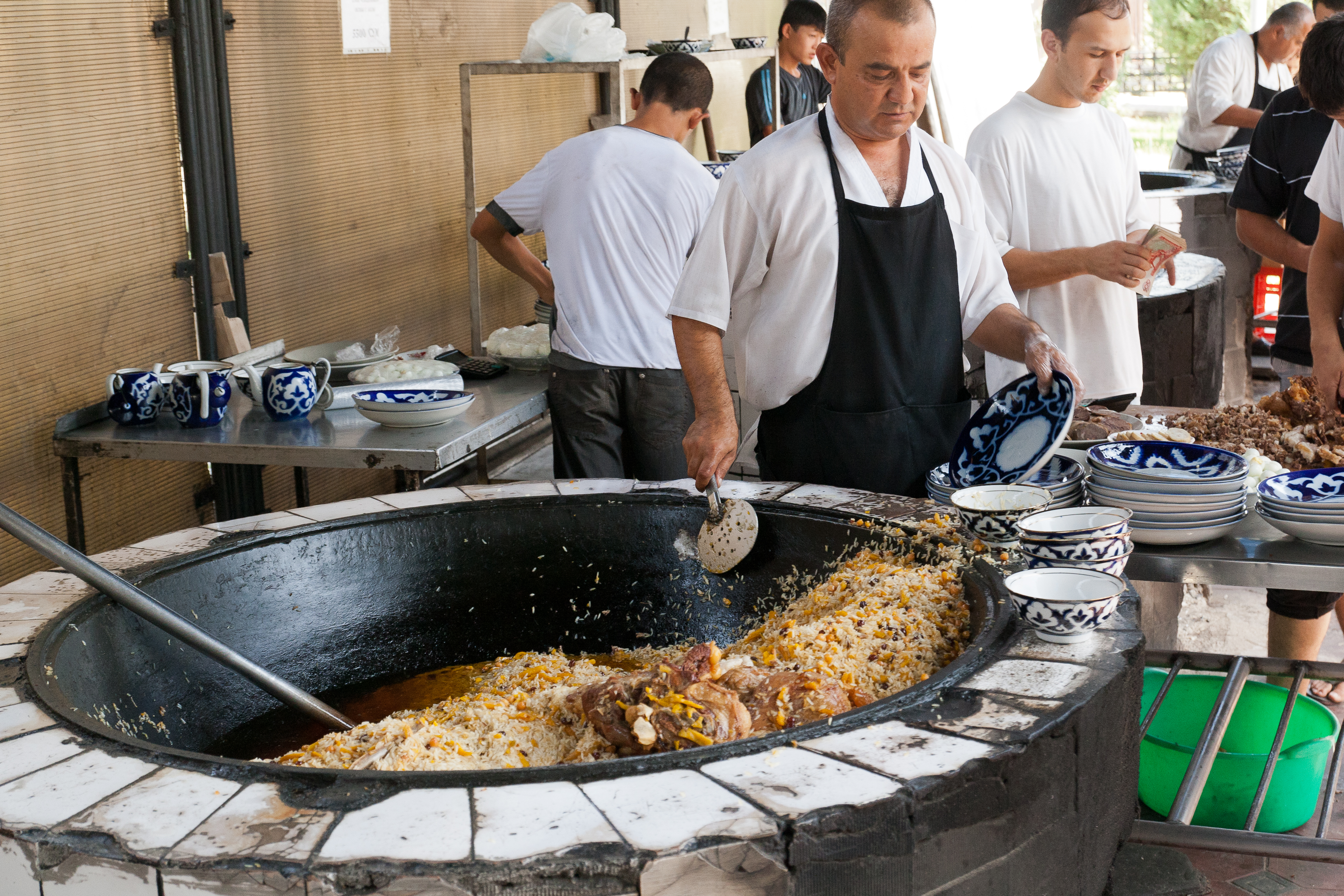
- Public plov cooking in Tashkent, Uzbekistan
- Country: Uzbekistan
- Reference: 01166
- Region: Asia and the Pacific

Inscription history
- Inscription: 2016 (11th session)
- List: Representative List of the Intangible Cultural Heritage of Humanity

Uzbek plov, also known as palov or osh, is a traditional Uzbek rice dish made with meat (typically fatty lamb cuts), julienned carrots, onions, garlic, rice, cumin powder and cooked together in oil or fat. It is regarded as the national dish of Uzbekistan and is of significant importance to the country's history, tradition, and culture.

== History ==
Pilaf is believed to have originated in Persia and throughout history, was spread throughout Central Asia along migration and trade routes in the ancient Silk Road, primarily present day Tajikistan. Over time, local variations of pilaf were developed in various regions and Uzbek plov specifically evolved distinctive characteristics in Uzbekistan, such as a "zirvak" base and layering method in a kazan. Over many centuries, it became well established into Uzbek culture and can be found prepared traditionally for weddings, holidays and communal gatherings, often in large quantities as a symbol for hospitality.

== Ingredients and preparation ==
The core ingredients are carrots, onions, fatty lamb cuts and long-grain rice. Other ingredients may include chickpeas, raisins, garlic, and spices such as cumin, black pepper, and coriander.

The first steps are to peel and julienne the carrots into strips. Then fry the meat and carrots in oil or lamb fat. This creates a rich aromatic base called a "zirvak".

The next step is layering uncooked rice on top of the zirvak, then add water and simmer until the rice is fully cooked. This layering technique allows flavours to meld together, while keeping the rice fluffy and separate.

This dish is frequently cooked in cast-iron cauldrons or kazān, but can also be made with other cookware, such as a Dutch oven, pressure cooker, large sauté pan, or heavy wok.

== Cultural significance ==
In Uzbekistan, large-scale plov cooking, typically in open-air settings with a very large kazan, is a traditional way to celebrate and show hospitality in connection with, for example, weddings, national holidays and large communal gatherings.

In 2016, UNESCO recognized not only the culinary aspects of the dish, but also its cultural importance, and transmission of cultural knowledge over many generations. The dish and its culture was inscribed into the UNESCO Representative List of the Intangible Cultural Heritage of Humanity, following a decision adopted by Intergovernmental Committee for the Safeguarding of the Intangible Cultural Heritage. This recognition aims to help promote and conserve the traditions of plov to be passed down within families and communities.

== See also ==
- Pilaf
- Biryani
- Kabuli palaw
- Central Asian cuisine
