= Malawach =

Yemenite Jewish flatbread

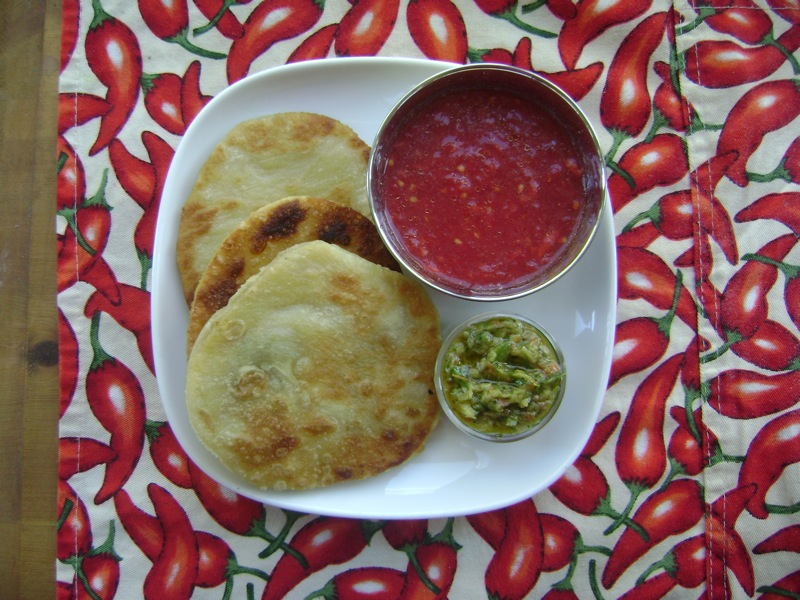
- Malawach, as traditionally served by Yemenite Jews, with zhoug and resek
- Type: Bread
- Place of origin: Yemen
- Region or state: Israel
- Created by: Yemenite Jews
- Main ingredients: Laminated dough, clarified butter, or butter, or cooking oil, occasionally Nigella sativa

Malawach or melawwaḥ (Hebrew: מלוואח), is a Jewish Yemenite flatbread that is traditional in Yemeni cuisine and Israeli cuisine. The name of the dish comes from the Arabic "ملوح", literally “board-like bread”. It was brought to Israel by Yemenite Jews whose population no longer exists in Yemen. Malawach resembles a thick pancake but consists of thin layers of puff pastry brushed with oil or fat and cooked flat in a frying pan. It is traditionally served with hard-boiled eggs, zhug, and resek agvaniyot. Sometimes it is served with honey.

== History ==
The dough traditionally takes three days to make, since it is a multi-stage process, and the dough must rest in between each phase.

— Regev Eibenschutz

According to Rabbi Gil Marks, a Jewish food historian, malawach is made from the same dough as jachnun, and both originated as a variation of puff pastry, brought to Yemen by Jews expelled from Spain. It later became "ajin", an enriched dough made by the Yemenite Jews.

== Preparation ==
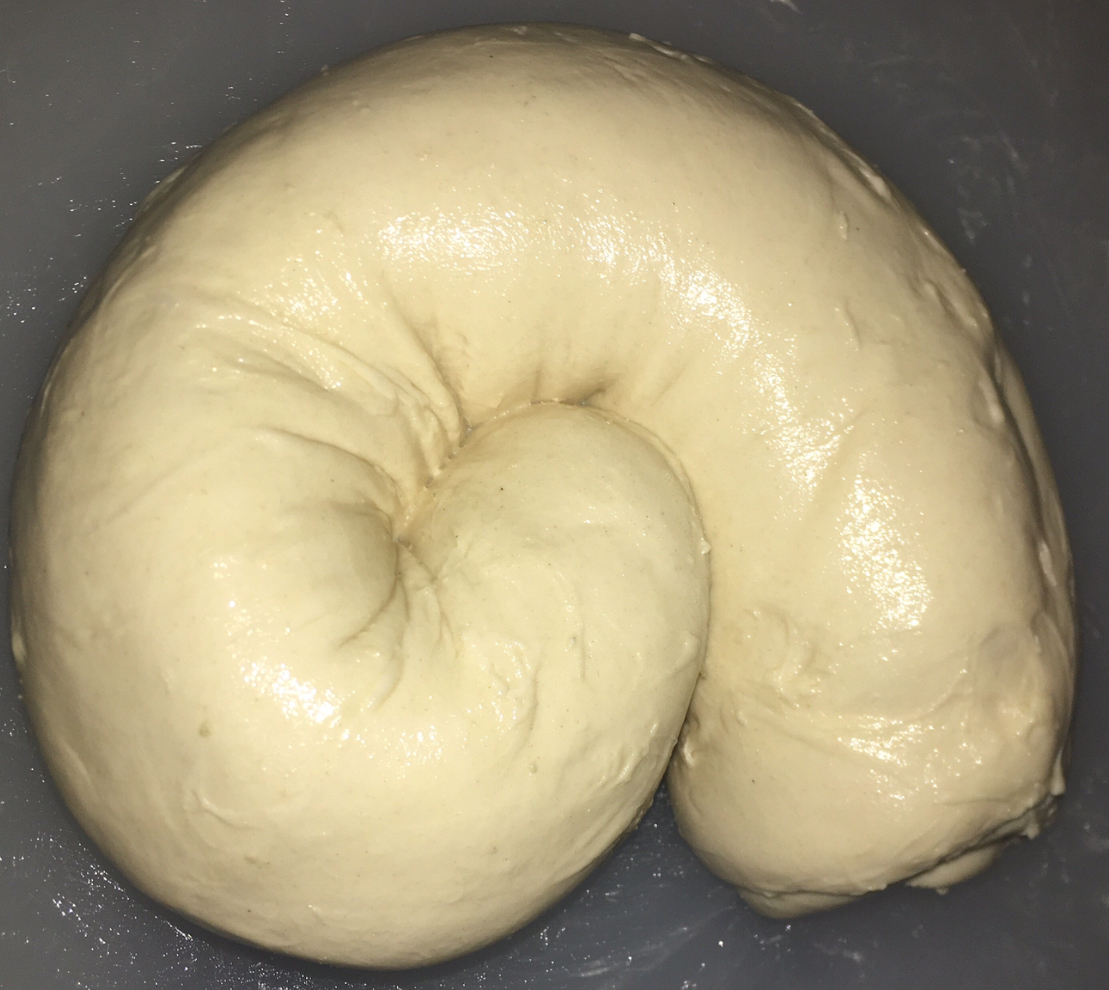
Malawach dough that has been rolled in out, spread with butter and formed into a coil

Malawach was traditionally prepared at home by the women in the Yemenite Jewish community, and is made out of a laminated dough similar to puff pastry that has been enriched with either butter, clarified butter, or margarine if pareve; creating a very flaky consistency with many layers, similar to a croissant. The dough is divided into balls, and is rolled out, and then commonly placed between wax paper and placed in the freezer. It is then fried in a small amount of oil from a frozen state, as if it is fried fresh, the butter or other fat will seep out of the dough, making it harder to work with and not flaky. Freezing the dough helps the butter or other fat remain in solid form once the malawach comes into contact with the hot oil, causing the creation of its signature flaky layers, and causing the bread to rise somewhat. Malawach is typically fried as one large flatbread, though sometimes it is fried in smaller pieces. It is served hot, traditionally with zhoug, resek, and hardboiled egg, although a variety of other pairings and dips are now popular as well such as honey, jam, labneh, shakshouka, baba ghanoush, matbucha, and muhammara, among others.

== Popularity in Israel ==
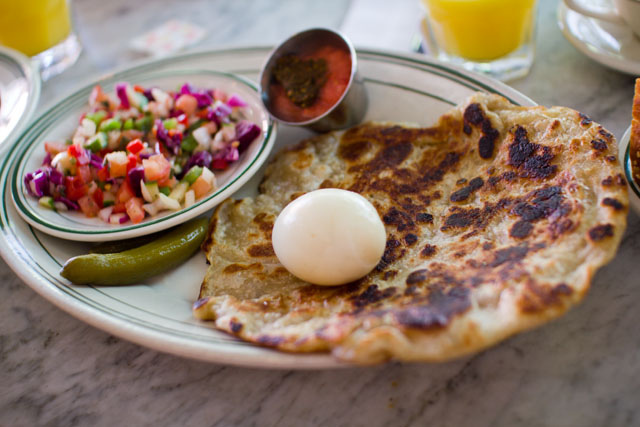
Malawach as traditionally served in Israel, with hard-boiled egg, resek (grated tomato) with zhug, Israeli salad, and an Israeli pickle

Malawach has historically been a staple of the Yemenite Jews. Through exodus of Yemenite Jews from Yemen in the mid-20th century, and their subsequent aliyah to Israel, it has become a very popular dish in Israel, and a favorite comfort food for Israelis of all backgrounds and origins. Malawach is traditionally made at home by members of the Yemenite Jewish community, but with the newfound, widespread popularity of malawach in Israel in recent decades, it is now commonly served at restaurants in Israel, many of which are dedicated to serving malawach and related dishes such as jachnun. It is commonly used as a sandwich wrap similar to a laffa, and is commonly served with shakshouka, hummus, sabich, and many other dishes. It is also commonly served as a dessert with labneh and jam. It is also used as a pizza crust. Frozen malawah is commonly available in grocery stores across the nation, by brands such as Ta'amti, and Osem, and is exported abroad to kosher supermarkets in the United States, United Kingdom, Canada, France, and other nations. Frozen malawach can be used as a substitute for dough in different recipes such as bourekas, sambusak, and many others.

== See also ==
- Yemenite Jewish cuisine
- Israeli cuisine
- Israeli culture
- Jewish cuisine
- Sephardic Jewish cuisine
- Jachnun
- Kubaneh
