= Kubaneh =

Traditional food from Yemeni cuisine

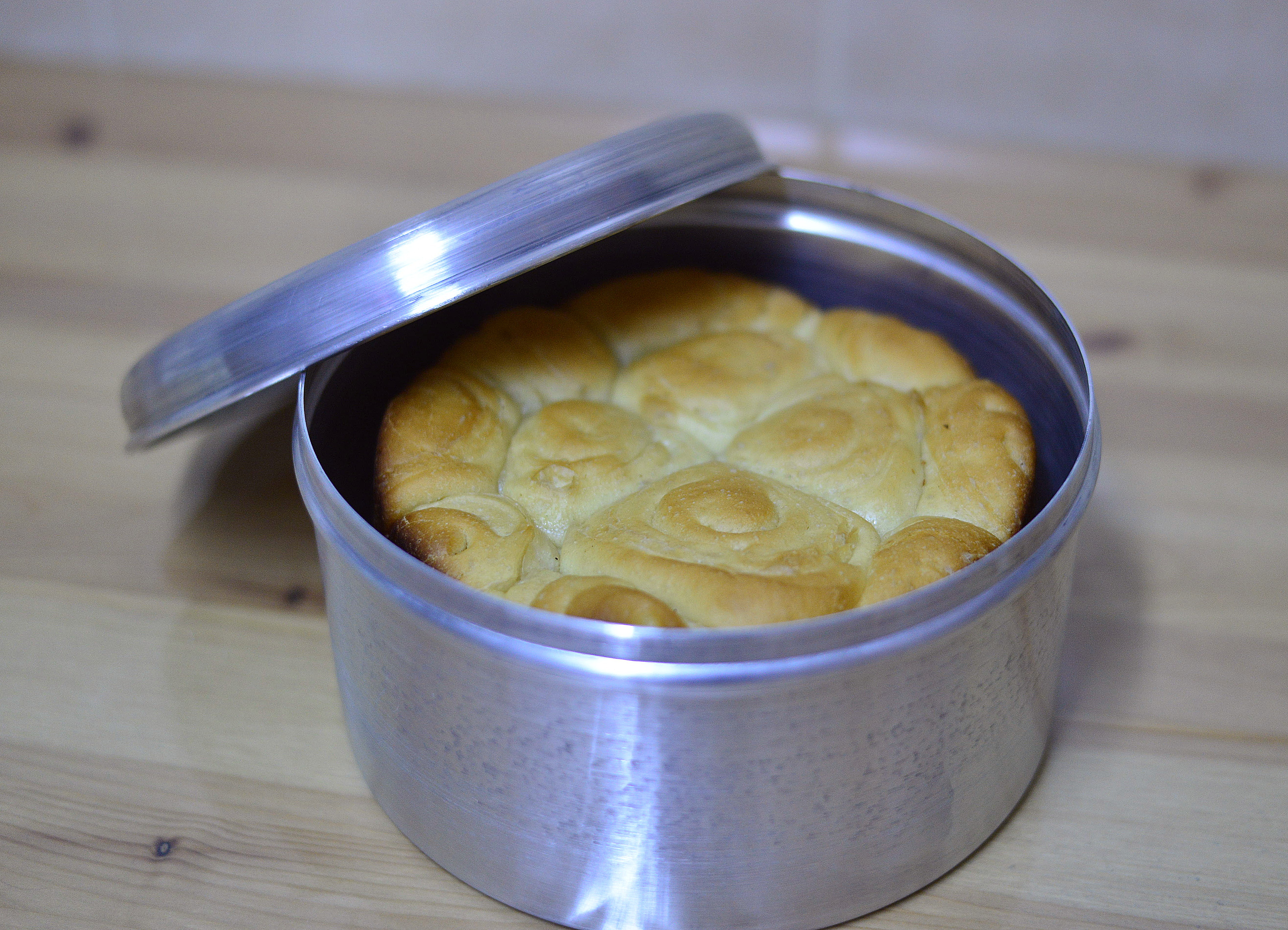
- The Kubaneh
- Alternative names: kubani, kubneh, kubane
- Type: Bread
- Place of origin: Yemen
- Created by: Yemenite Jews
- Main ingredients: Flour, yeast, sugar, salt, water, butter or margarine, vegetable oil

Kubaneh (Hebrew: כֻּבַּאנֶה) is a traditional Yemenite Jewish yeast bread that is popular in Israel. It is traditionally baked overnight to be served for Shabbat breakfast. The bread is often served alongside haminados (eggs that are baked in their shells along with the bread), and grated tomato.

== History ==
Although a Jewish community existed in Yemen for thousands of years, only a very small community of Jews remains in Yemen today. Yemenite Jews traditionally made their kubaneh from either sorghum flour or cornmeal during the regular weekdays, but used wheat flour on Sabbath days and holidays.

Some would add to the dough either sugar, honey or black cumin. Baking was done in a greased pot, tightly sealed, and left to cook overnight. The kubāneh was eaten the following day while it was still hot, and many of the diners have been known to ask for the qaʻeh – the hard and oily lower crust, known for its delicate taste. During the winter months, some were known to insert in the kubāneh the fatty-tail of sheep, or some other piece of meat, which was baked overnight along with the dough. This was considered a delicacy and was served to women after childbirth.

== Overview ==
Kubaneh is a Yemenite Jewish bread baked overnight and eaten for breakfast or brunch on Shabbat. It is baked at a low temperature in a tightly covered container. Ingredients include flour, sugar, salt, and butter (or margarine). Eggs in their shell are sometimes added to the container and served as an accompaniment. Kubaneh is traditionally served with grated tomatoes, or served with zhug, clarified butter, and hot pepper-garlic chutney.

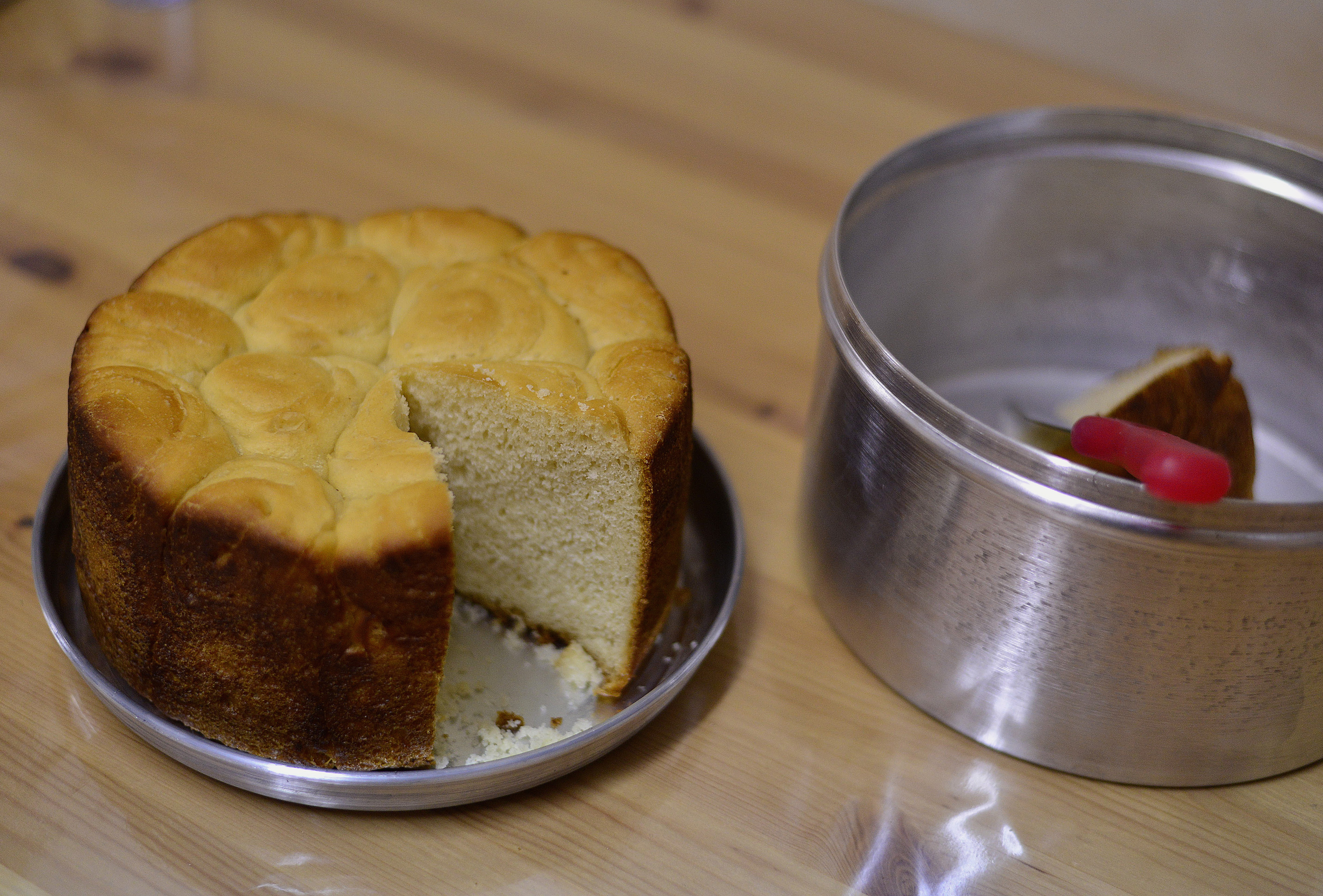
Kubaneh, freshly baked

== In popular culture ==
Kubaneh was featured in the popular Israeli television series Beauty and the Baker, as the lead character Amos Dahari, played by Aviv Alush (who himself is of Yemenite and Tunisian Jewish descent) is from a Yemenite Jewish family.

== See also ==
- Jachnun
- Malawach
- Israeli cuisine
- Jewish cuisine
- Mouna- a similar bread prepared by Algerian Jews
- Russian Mennonite zwieback
- Monkey bread
