= Zhug =

Yemeni hot sauce

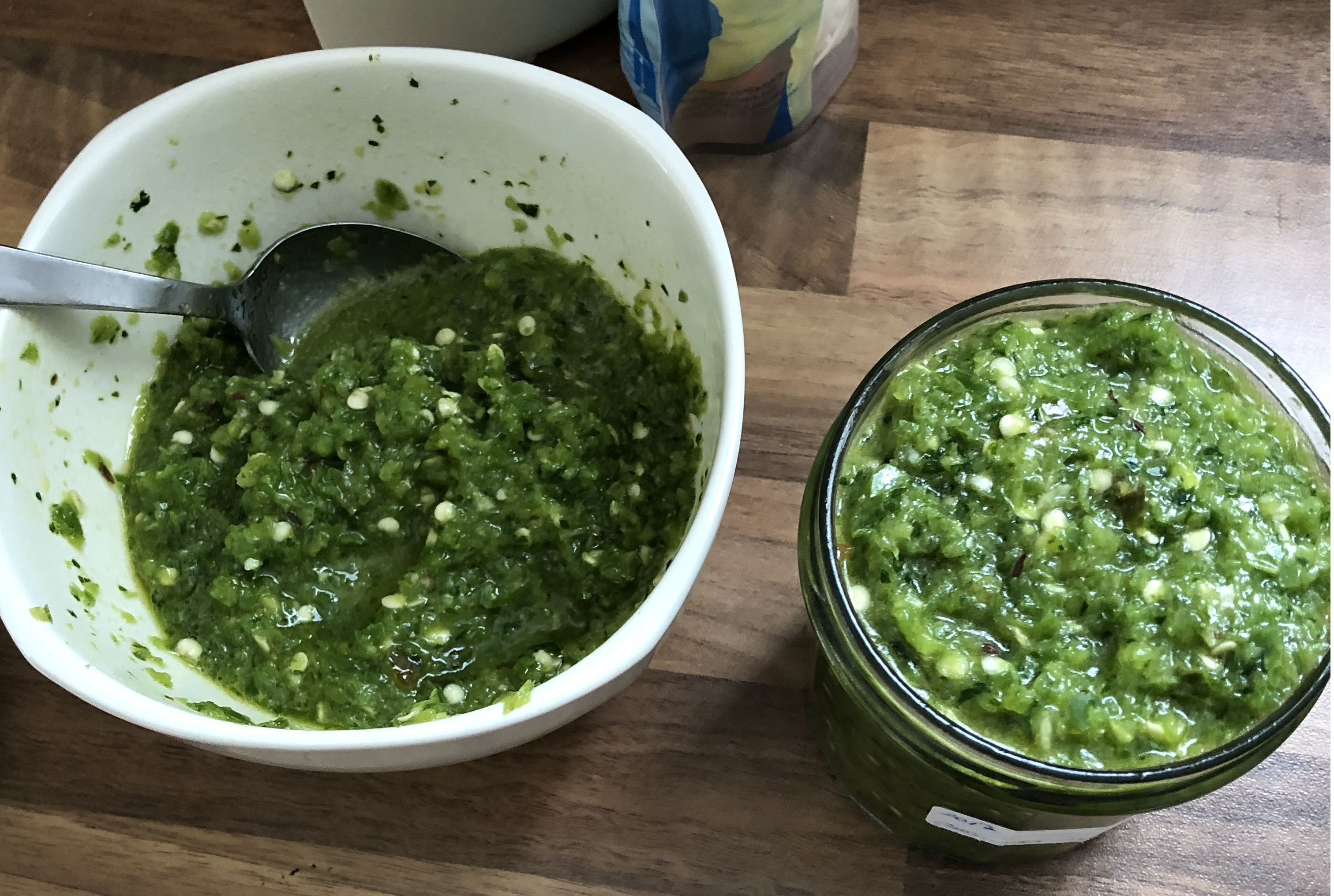
- Green zhug
- Alternative names: Harif, mabooj, sahawiq, sahowqa, schugg, skhug, bisbaas
- Type: Condiment
- Place of origin: Yemen
- Main ingredients: Hot peppers, garlic, coriander
- Variations: Red sahawiq, green sahawiq, brown sahawiq

Zhug (from Yemenite Arabic سحوق or זחוק IPA: [zħuːq] through Hebrew: סְחוּג, romanized: skhug), also known as sahawiq (Yemeni Arabic: سَحاوِق, IPA: [saħaːwiq]), is a hot sauce originating in Yemeni cuisine. In other countries of the Arabian Peninsula it is also called mabooj (Arabic: معبوج), and bisbaas.

== Etymology and pronunciation ==
The Hebrew word is pronounced [sχug], and not [ʒug] as the English spelling zhug might suggest.

The word sahawiq [saħaːwiq] comes from the Arabic root (s-ḥ-q) which means to pestle or to crush. This makes it semantically equivalent to pesto. Formally, it is a plural form.

== Varieties ==
Varieties in Yemen include sahawiq akhdar (green sahawiq), sahawiq ahmar (red sahawiq), and sahawiq bel-jiben (sahawiq with cheese, usually Yemeni cheese). Sahawiq is one of the main ingredients of saltah. Wazif (traditional Yemeni dried baby sardines) is sometimes added to the sahawiq's ingredients and it is known as sahawiq wazif (Arabic: سحاوق وزف).

In Israel, one can find skhug adom ("red zhug"), skhug yarok ("green zhug") and skhug khum ("brown zhug"), which has added tomatoes. Red zhug is made with red peppers while green zhug is made with green peppers, or jalapeños.

Zhug may be referred to by the generic term harif (Hebrew: חריף; lit. "hot/spicy"). Also known as zhoug, it is a popular condiment at Israeli falafel and shawarma stands, and served with hummus.

== Preparation ==
Zhug is made from fresh red or green hot peppers (like bird's eye chilies or, less traditionally, jalapeños) seasoned with coriander, garlic, salt, black cumin (optional) and parsley, and then mixed with olive oil. Some also add lemon juice, caraway seed, cardamom, and black pepper.

Traditional Yemeni cooks prepare zhug using two stones: a large stone called marha' (مرهى) used as a work surface and a smaller one called wdi (ودي) for crushing the ingredients. Alternative options are a mortar and pestle or a food processor. Yemenis sometimes add Pulicaria jaubertii.

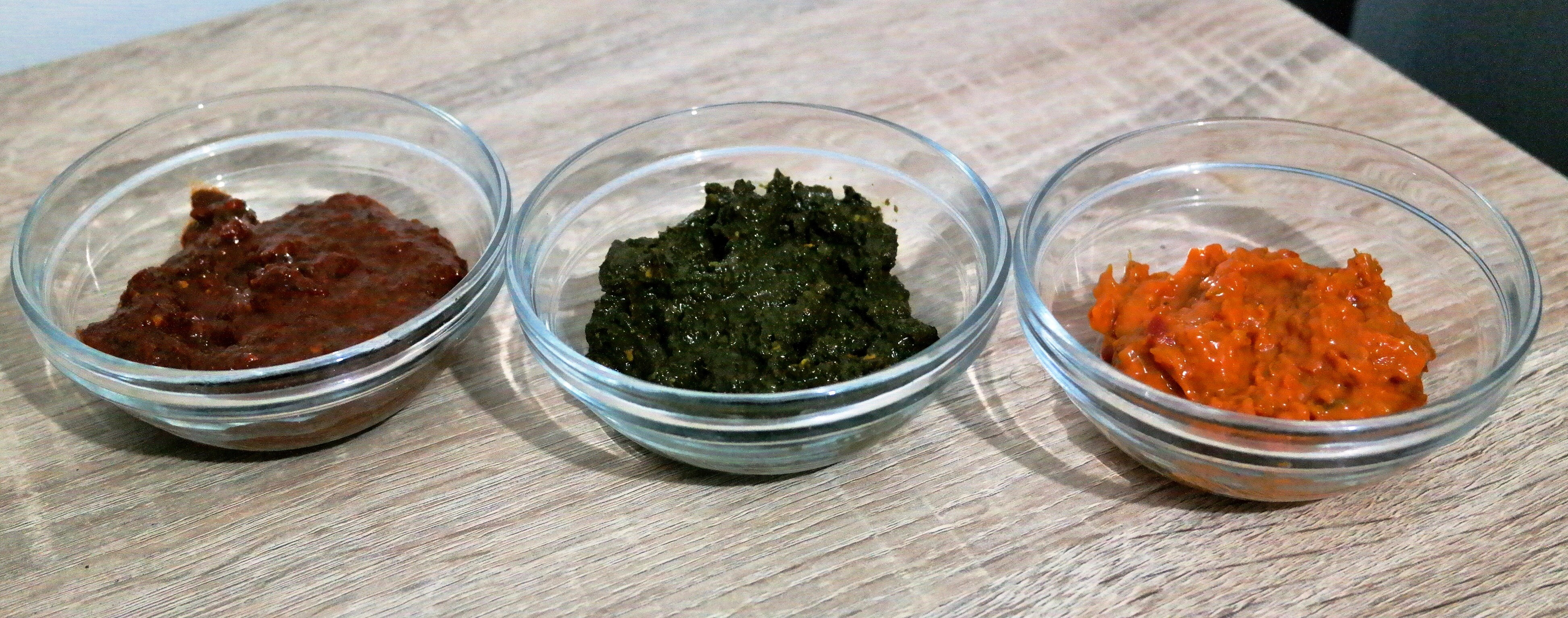
Red, green, and smoked zhug

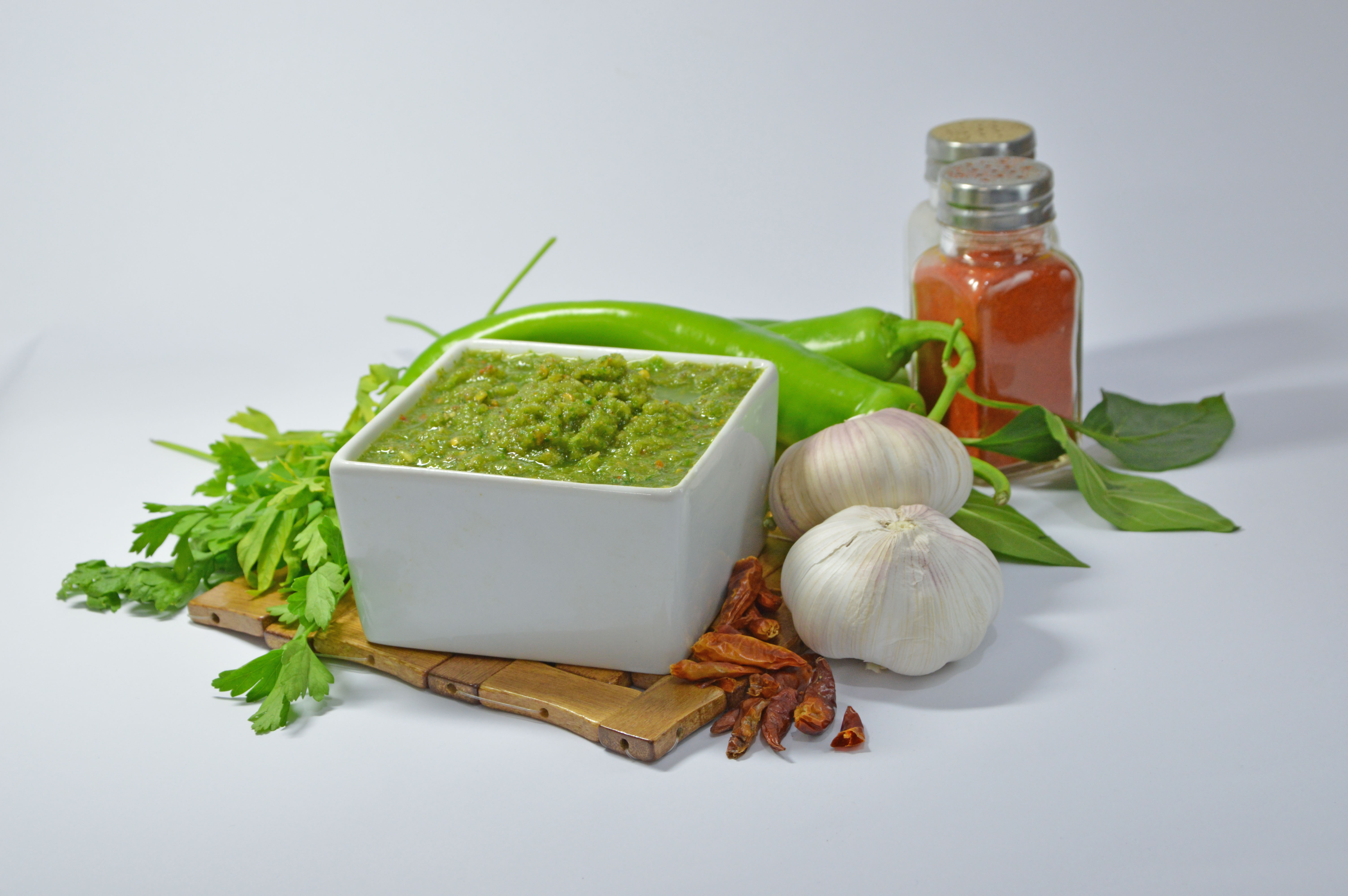
Zhug and its ingredients

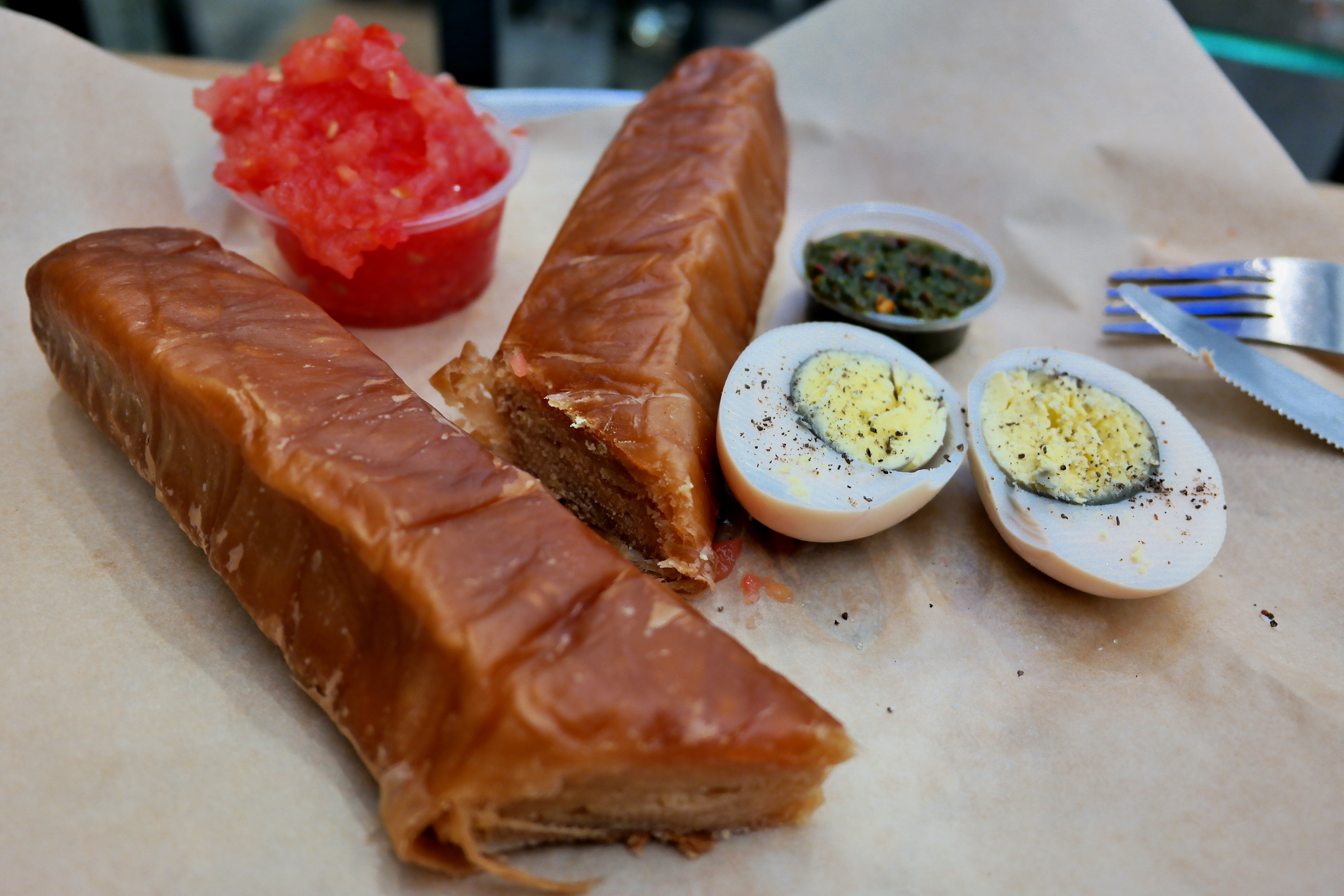
Jachnun served alongside boiled eggs, grated tomatoes, and zhug

== See also ==
- Ajika, a hot dip in Caucasian cuisine
- Harissa, a hot chili pepper paste in Maghreb cuisine
- Muhammara or acuka, a hot pepper dip in Levantine cuisine
- Pesto, a sauce made with crushed herbs and garlic in Italian cuisine
- Chutney
- Arab cuisine
- Cuisine of the Mizrahi Jews
- List of dips
- List of sauces
