= Yemeni cuisine =

Culinary traditions of Yemen

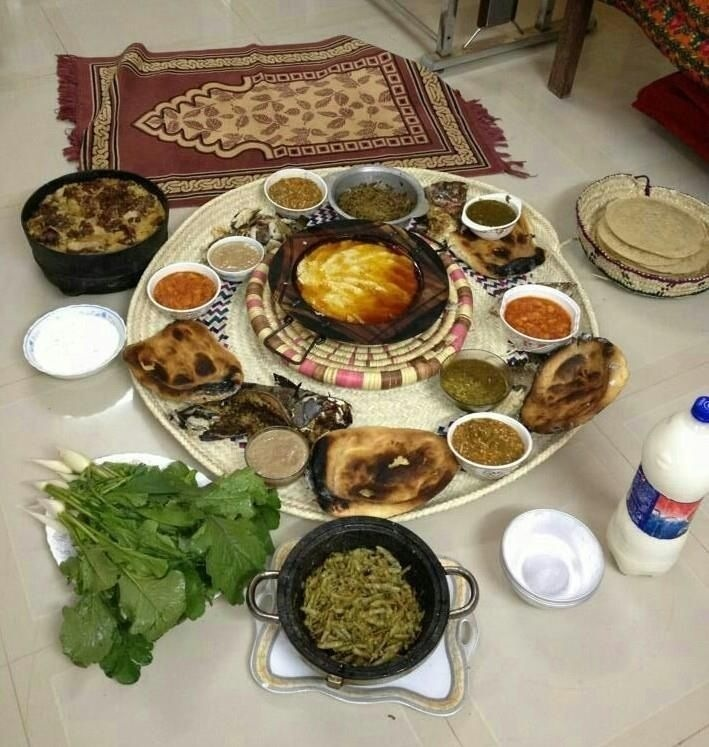
A typical Yemeni breakfast

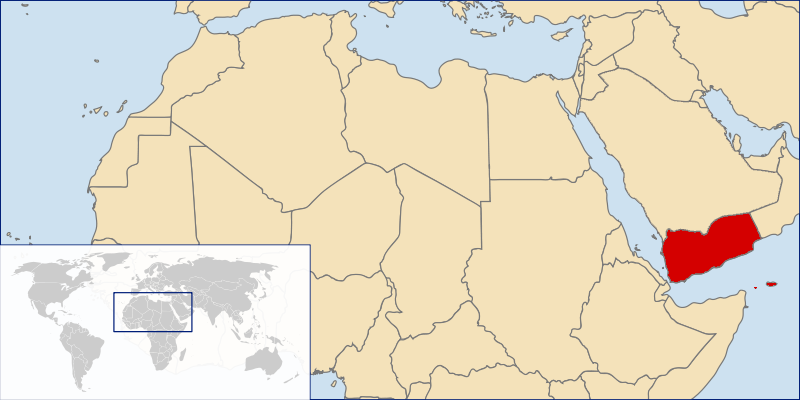
Location of Yemen

Yemeni cuisine is distinct from the wider Middle Eastern cuisines with regional variation. Despite being an Arab country, Yemeni cooking traditions have been influenced more by Indian and Indonesian methods as a result of its maritime history.

== Customs ==
The generous offering of food to guests is one of the customs in Yemeni culture, and a guest not accepting the offering is considered an insult. Meals are typically consumed while sitting on the floor or ground. Unlike the tradition in Arab countries and like the tradition in Mediterranean countries, lunch is the main meal of the day in Yemen, not dinner.

== Food preparation ==
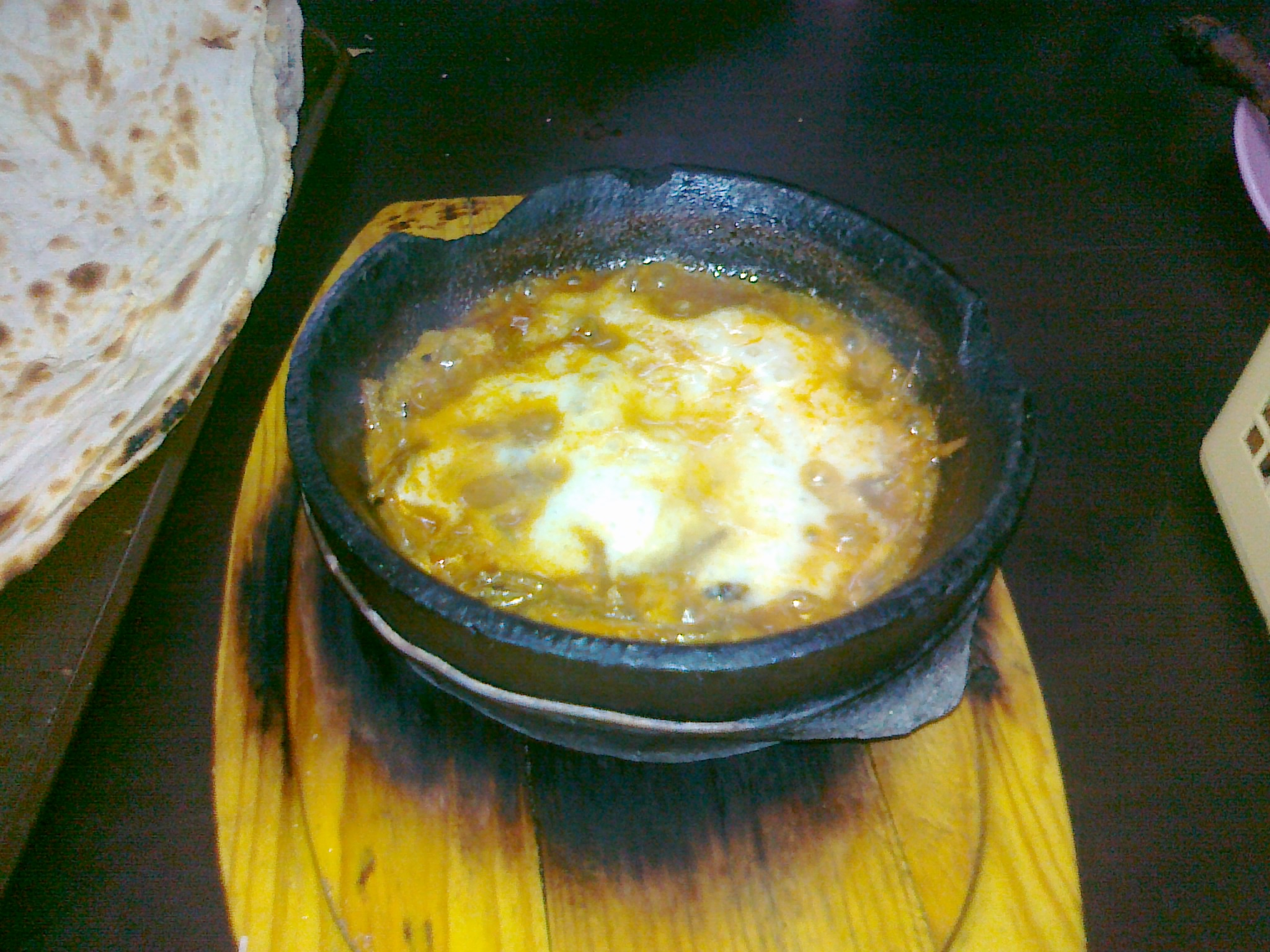
Fahsa served in a stony madra.

In Yemen, many kitchens have a tandoor (also called tannur), which is a round clay oven. Madra (مدرة) is a cooking utensil made from clay or soapstone that is also used as a serving bowl that preserves the heat of the dish.

== Fruits and vegetables ==
Tomatoes, onions, and potatoes are some of the staple fruits and vegetables in Yemen.

== Meat and dairy ==
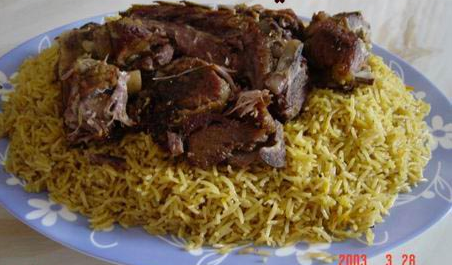
Homemade mandi is considered the national dish of Yemen; it is originally from the province of Hadhramaut, Yemen.

Chicken, goat, and lamb are the staple meats in Yemen. They are eaten more often than beef. Fish is also eaten, especially in the coastal areas.

Cheese, butter, and other dairy products are less common in the Yemeni diet. Buttermilk, however, is enjoyed almost daily in some villages where it is most available. The most commonly used fats are vegetable oil and ghee used in savory dishes, while clarified butter, known as semn (سمن), is the choice of fat used in pastries.

Pork consumption is forbidden to Muslims in Yemen, in accordance with Islamic dietary laws.

The city of Taiz is famous for its production of smoked cheese, called "Taiz cheese".

== Legumes ==
Broad beans are used in Yemeni dishes, such as bean salad. Lentils are also used in dishes such as stews.

== Yemeni dishes ==
=== Breakfast dishes ===
Yemeni people prefer to have warm dishes in the morning. Typically, the meal consists of different types of pastries with a cup of Yemeni coffee or tea.

A more hearty meal often includes legumes, eggs, or even roasted meat or kebab, which is usually served with a type of bread either aside or as a sandwich. People in Yemen also make a breakfast dish from lamb or beef liver, which is considered a bizarre delicacy to non-Yemenis.

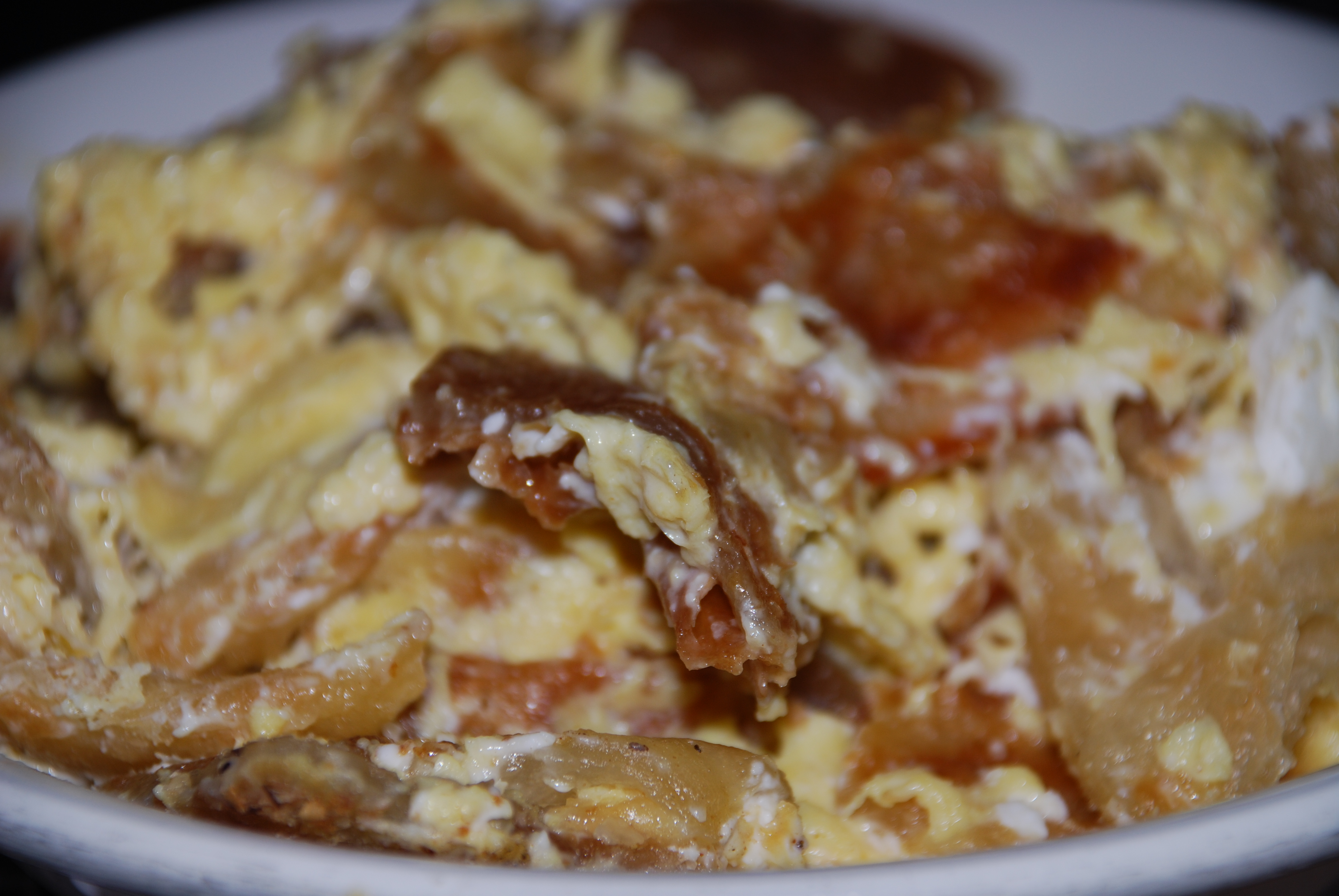
A fatoot of fried bread with eggs

Dishes common at breakfast include masoub, fatoot, ful medames, mutabbaq, and shakshouka.

=== Lunch dishes ===
Unlike most countries, and like Greece, Spain and Portugal, lunch is the main meal of the day in Yemen, not dinner. The largest amount of meat, poultry, and grains are consumed at lunch.

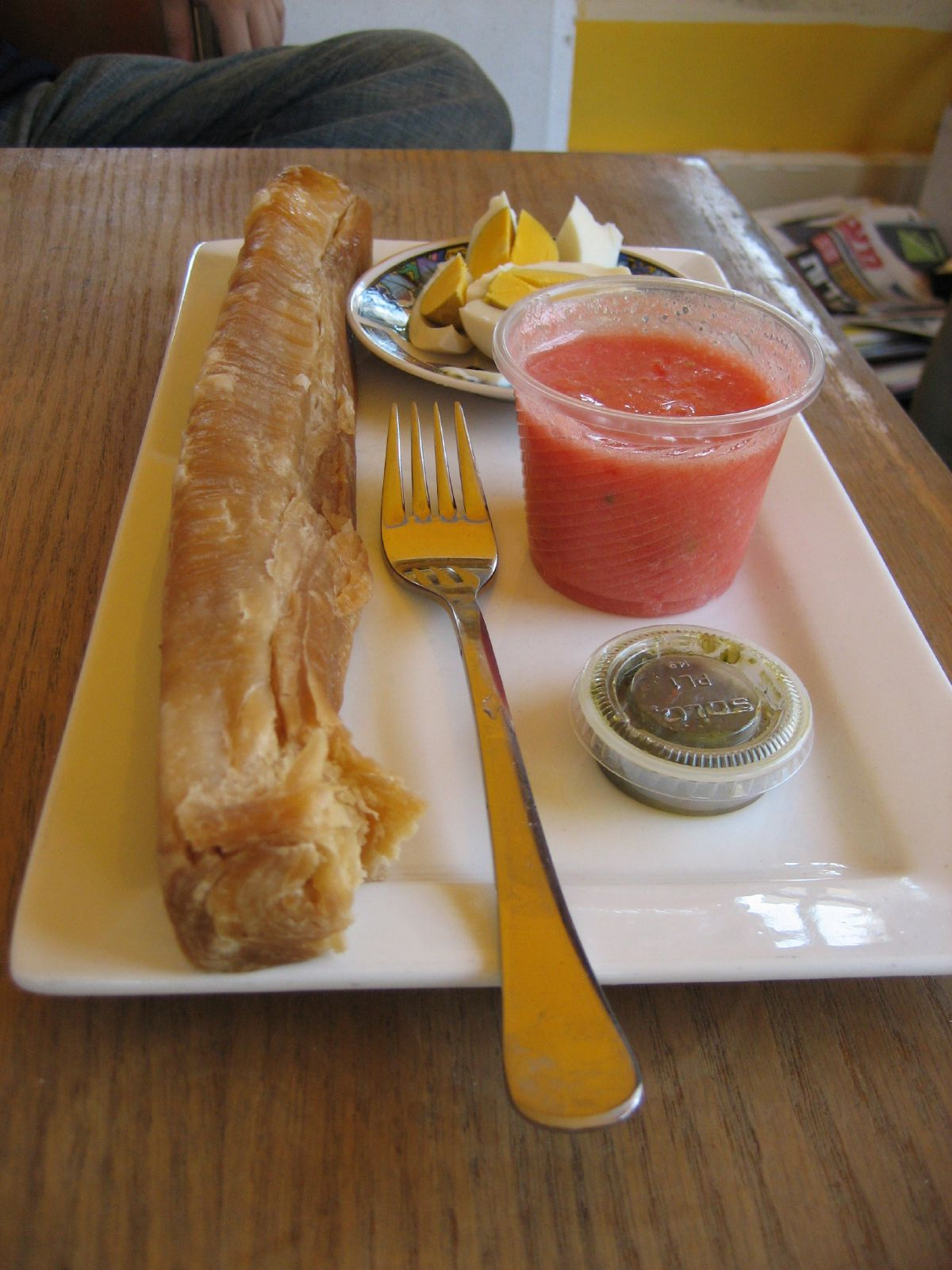
Jachnun served with oven-baked egg, fresh-grated tomato, and zhug

Dishes common at lunch include:

- Aseed—a dish made from a cooked wheat-flour lump of dough, sometimes with added butter or honey
- Fahsa—a Yemeni stew made from lamb cutlets with lamb broth

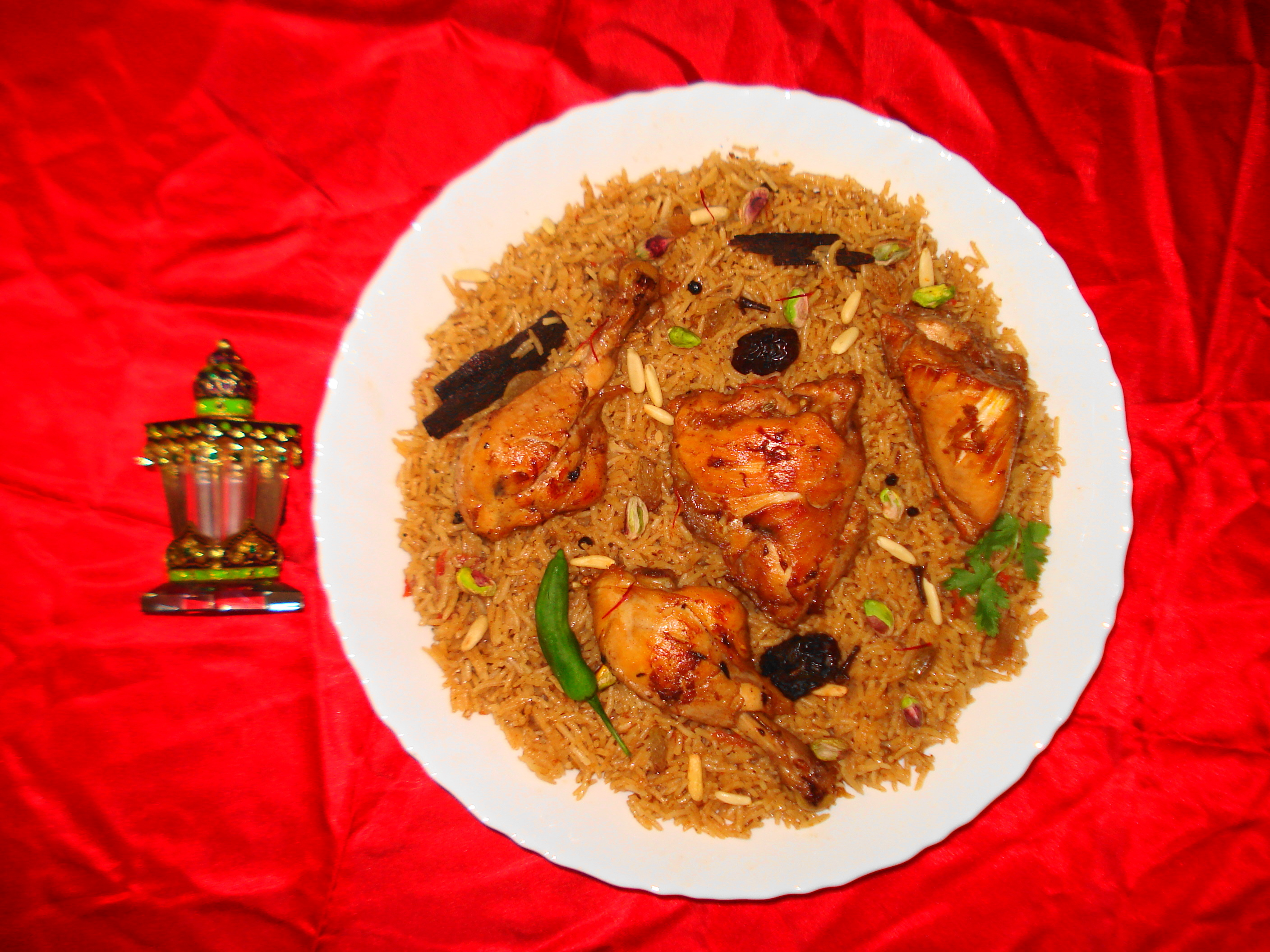
Kabsa is also known as machbūs in Arab countries in the Persian Gulf

- Fattah—a dish made with pieces of fresh, toasted, grilled, or stale flatbread covered with other ingredients
- Haneeth—a slow-roasted lamb dish cooked in a tannour with a spice rub, usually served on a plate of rice
- Harees—boiled, cracked, or coarsely ground wheat, mixed with meat and seasoned

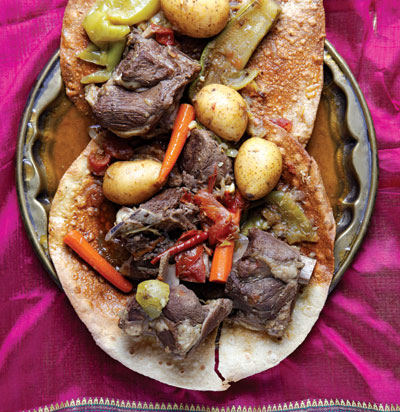
A dry preparation of lamb thareed

- Jachnun—an Adeni Jewish pastry, traditionally served on Shabbat morning
- Kabsa—a mixed rice dish, served on a communal platter
- Komroh—made with fava beans, garlic, ghee, black pepper, and salt
- Mandi—meat and rice with a special blend of spices, cooked in a pit underground
- Samak mofa—Yemeni-style grilled fish
- Shafut—typically made with lahoh (a sourdough flatbread) or shredded bread, hakeen (traditional buttermilk) or yogurt, zhug, and leek
- Shawiyah—Yemeni-style rotisserie chicken
- Thareed—pieces of bread in a vegetable or meat broth
- Sahawiq—a spicy green sauce made of fresh herbs, garlic, chilies, olive oil, lemon, and freshly ground spices.
- Zurbiyan—made with lamb, rice, and saffron

== National dish ==
After Yemen united in 1990, both North and South Yemen had similar cuisines. Despite its regional variations, saltah is considered to be the national dish of Yemen. The most common dishes consumed all over Yemen are made with rice and lamb.

There are many ways of preparing lamb in Yemen. In general though, the lamb is usually bone-in large chunks. It can be boiled in its broth and called maraq, it can be roasted in an oven like haneeth, or underground like mandi.

== Yemeni bread varieties ==
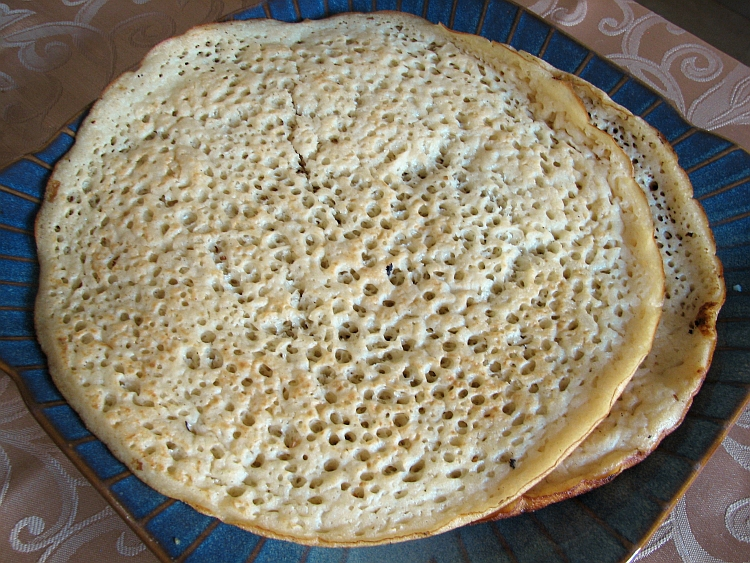
Lahuh

Breads are an integral part of Yemeni cuisine, most of which are prepared from local grains. Unleavened flatbreads are common. Ṣalūf, a flatbread made from wheat flour, is the most common of all breadstuffs. The dough is allowed to ferment with ḫamīra (yeast), while some would baste the surface of the dough with a prepared batch of unseasoned fenugreek (ḥilba) prior to baking. These were almost always baked at home in an earthenware oven called tannour (تنور) in Arabic, the size of each bread roughly being 2 cm (0.79 in) in thickness with a diameter of 20 cm (7.9 in) to 30 cm (12 in).

Khobz al tawa, tameez, malooga, kader, kubane, fateer, kudam, khameer, and mulawah are also popular breads eaten in Yemen. Malooj, khubz, and khamir are popular homemade breads. Store-bought pita bread and roti (bread rolls like French bread) are also common. Khaliat Naḥl (Arabic: خلية نحل), or "honeycomb bread", is commonly associated with Yemeni cuisine.

=== Other Yemeni grain dishes ===
- ʻAṣīṭ—sorghum meal, cornmeal, or green barley meal made into a thick paste after being boiled in water. Before eating, samneh or oil is added. Some eat ʻaṣīṭ during the afternoon meal (usually scooped up with one's fingers), where soup and meat are served, while others place it in the soup, along with ḥilba ("fenugreek dollop").
- Harīš—a thick dish (groats), made with cracked wheat, 1/4–1/3 of the kernel's full size, known collectively as ğašūš. There are some who add samneh (clarified butter), honey or sugar to harīš.
  In Yemen, harīš is usually eaten on cold winter mornings, and, because of perceived health benefits, is given to women during the first weeks after childbirth, also to the infirm, the weak, and the frail.

Similarly, harīs is a thick grain dish (groats), made with broken wheat, rice, lentils or beans, pre-cooked in water with an added fatty portion of meat or bone marrow, along with vegetables—spring onions (scallions), garlic, tomatoes, and more.

- Maṭīṭ—a thin, farinaceous dish (porridge), made with ground wheat or barley (maṭīṭ šiʻīr), drunk with samneh, and occasionally with grated onions or sweet marjoram, which gives it a bitter taste.
- Našūf—a thin, grain-based dish (porridge), made with broken wheat, cooked with either samneh, sugar or honey, and sipped from a bowl, usually for breakfast. Villagers cook našūf with sour milk, adding sahawiq (a hot cayenne-pepper sauce) for added flavoring, a dish known locally as našūf ʻalā zūm.

== Spices ==
A spice mixture known as hawaij is employed in many Yemeni dishes. Hawaij includes aniseed, fennel seeds, ginger, and cardamom.

Yemeni cuisine is often prepared hot and spicy with the use of chili peppers, cumin, coriander seeds, turmeric, and other spices. Herbs such as fenugreek, mint, and cilantro are also used. Fenugreek is used as one of the main ingredients in the preparation of a paste or sauce called holba (also spelled hulba). A popular spice used in breads (including kubane and sabayah) is black cumin, which is also known by its Arabic name habasoda (habbat as sowda).

== Desserts and sweets ==
Bint al-sahn (sabayah) is a sweet honey cake or bread from Yemeni cuisine. It is prepared from a dough with white flour, eggs, and yeast, which is then served dipped in a honey and butter mixture. The tulumba of the city of Taiz are popular as a Ramadan sweet.

Other common desserts include fresh fruit (mangoes, bananas, grapes, etc.), baklawa, basbousa, kunafah, zalābiya, halwa, rawani, and masoob. Masoob is a banana-based dessert made from over-ripe bananas, ground flatbread, cream, cheese, dates, and honey.

=== Honey ===
In Yemen, honey is produced within the country, and is considered a delicacy. Locally produced honey is in high demand, and it is also considered as a status symbol in the country.

== Beverages ==
Shahi haleeb (milk tea), black tea (with cardamom, clove, or mint), qishr (coffee husks), qahwa (Arabic coffee), karkade (an infusion of dried hibiscus flowers), naqe'e al zabib (cold raisin drink), and diba'a (squash nectar) are examples of popular Yemeni drinks. Mango and guava juices are also popular.

Although coffee and tea are consumed throughout Yemen, coffee is the preferred drink in Sanaa, whereas black tea is the beverage of choice in Aden and Hadhramaut. Tea is consumed along with breakfast, after lunch (occasionally with sweets and pastries), and along with dinner. Popular flavorings include cloves with cardamom and mint. A drink made from coffee husks, called qishr, is also enjoyed.

Alcoholic beverages are considered improper due to cultural and religious reasons.

== Internationally ==
=== United States ===
In the United States, Yemeni coffeehouses became a trend in the 2010s and 2020s, offering foods like Adeni tea or Khaliat nahl. As of 2026, 6 major Yemeni coffee chains were running 136 Yemeni-style cafes in the US, a number 50% higher than the previous year. Most such cafes were in the vicinity of areas with large Arab American populations, like Dearborn, Michigan. In 2025, Bon Appétit reported 30 distinct Yemeni-owned cafe brands in the US. Those shops have been attributed to Yemeni Americans, of whom there were 91,300 in 2020.

== See also ==
- Arab cuisine
- Halas (food)
