= Saudi Arabian cuisine =

Culinary traditions of Saudi Arabia

Saudi Arabian cuisine (Arabic: المطبخ العربي السعودي) is the cooking styles and dishes of Saudi Arabia. Varying throughout the diverse landscapes and regions of the country, the environmental, geographic, and cultural differences have led to a wide variety of dishes. Saudi Arabia encompasses different regions, resulting in cuisines from the Central region, Eastern, Southern and Western regions. Furthermore, Saudi Arabia's position along global trade routes has led to the introduction of various spices.

Cooking in Saudi Arabia is influenced by the native Arab and the Islamic culture. Dates, for example, are associated with the tradition of breaking the fast after Ramadan. Most food ingredients, such as wheat, dates, ghee, meat, fish and vegetables, are sourced locally. Through these ingredients, dozens of delicious dishes have been created, which are closely linked to Saudi Arabian customs and traditions. These dishes are typically enjoyed during festive seasons, Hajj, special occasions, weddings, and the arrival of a newborn. Serving these dishes to guests is a way of expressing generosity and the renowned hospitality of the people of Saudi Arabia. Some of these traditions continue to be practiced to this day.

Pork consumption is forbidden to Muslims in Saudi Arabia, in accordance with Sharia, the Islamic law.

== Traditional cuisine ==
=== Foods and dishes ===
Dish name	Image	Description
Mufattah		A method of serving a roasted lamb on rice. This method is considered a symbol of generosity and hospitality, and it is one of the main techniques used to serve feasts during major occasions and celebrations.
Kabsa		One of the best-known Saudi Arabian dishes found in most regions of the Kingdom is typically made with rice, vegetables, spices, herbs and either chicken, lamb, camel, or beef. Spices are considered the main ingredient in any kabsa since they, alongside herbs, provide its distinctive flavor. Among the mix of spices added to kabsa are black pepper, cardamom, saffron, cinnamon, cloves, dried lemon, and bay leaves, while the cooking sauce (kushnah) is made from caramelized onions and tomatoes.
Matazeez		Matazeez, a rich and filling main dish, is one of the best-known dishes in the Central region. Its origin and etymology are unclear as it is not found in Arabic dictionaries. It is believed that the word may be a combination of two words: mata, meaning to press or compress, referring to the dough that shrinks when cooked with meat and vegetables. Others believe that the word's origin is mataqiq, as the dough produces a cracking sound when kneaded, assuming that the letter q was gradually replaced with the letter z. This dish is popular throughout Saudi Arabia and is called by different names in various regions, such as marasi', al-quraysat, al-masabieh, or al-dahalis. Often consumed during winter for its ability to provide warmth, this dish is highly favored during Ramadan. Matazeez dough is made of whole wheat produced locally in Qassim. It is cut into relatively thick round shapes called mathayel. It is then dipped into a meat and vegetable marinade. The water level must be concentrated for the food to acquire a thick and rich taste and texture.
Jareesh		A well-known Saudi Arabian dish, especially in the Central region, consisting of crushed wheat. It is cooked with yogurt and chicken or other meat, and served with fried onion kushnah. At the beginning of 2023, it was chosen as a national dish.
Qursan		Thin bread discs soaked in meat and vegetable broth.
Margoog		Prepared from whole wheat flour (wheat bran), salt, and water. The ingredients are kneaded together and left until the meat is partially cooked. The vegetables are then added, and the dough is spread thinly over the same pot on top of the broth until it becomes soft.
Kleja		A well-known dessert in the Qassim region, made of wheat flour, sugar, honey, and spices.
Hanini		Mashed dates mixed with bread made from wheat flour.
Kabeba		Grape leaves stuffed with meat and rice.
Maqshush		A well-known winter dish in the Hail region and some northern regions of Saudi Arabia. Maqshush is made from brown flour, white flour, eggs, yeast, and milk. After preparation, it is topped with honey or ghee. Maqshush was chosen as the national dessert of Saudi Arabia in early 2023.
Sha'atha		A mixture of dates, hard dry laban (iqt), and ghee. It is well-known among the people of al-'Aridh and Sudair, and although the presentation may vary between them, the ingredients remain the same.
Harees		Prepared from meat, wheat, ghee, black pepper, cinnamon, and salt.
Saleeg		Cooked white rice with broth (chicken or meat) to which milk is added. It is one of the dishes of the Western region.
Fermoza		Meat-stuffed pastries baked in the oven.
Debyaza		This dish originates from Mecca, and it is called khushaf, or mixed nut, dates and apricot compote. It is a traditional dish that is always present during the celebration of Eid al-Fitr, marking the end of the holy month of Ramadan. This dish has a dense consistency similar to jam, which helps preserve it for up to six months. It is made from dried apricots, cardamom, cloves, cinnamon, dried dates and sugar. It is then left to soak for half an hour until it thickens before adding roasted nuts. It can be served cold or hot in decorative bowls called tutuah during the first few days of Eid. Some people enjoy dipping bread or shuraik in debyaza.
Bukhari rice		One of the best-liked dishes in the kingdom, equally widespread as kabsa. It is prepared by cutting the meat into medium-sized portions and lightly frying it in ghee or clarified butter. Ground chickpeas and finely chopped onions, known as kushnah, are added, as are tomato juice, black pepper and cumin. When the meat is nearly cooked, sliced carrots are added, followed by rice. The dish is then left to absorb the water and cook until done.
Mutabbaq		Mutabbaq is a well-known everyday snack, especially in the western part of Saudi Arabia. Especially during Ramadan or during Hajj and Umrah, it is enjoyed by many visitors in Mecca. It consists of a square-shaped fried (or baked in some regions) thin layer of bread stuffed mainly with minced meat (boiled with garlic), beaten eggs, chopped leeks, and green onion. Once cooked, it is cut further into smaller squares and is eaten with lemon and green chili.
Tharid		This dish dates back to the pre-Islamic Arab period and is called mashrubiyah. It is primarily made with meat and vegetables or bread (or both) which are combined and then formed into small pieces to be dipped into a deep meat broth dish.
Talbina		Porridge made from barley flour and its bran. A cup of water is added and then it is cooked over a low heat for 5 minutes. Then, a cup of milk and a tablespoon of honey are added. It is garnished with cinnamon or shredded almonds. In his Hadith on Talbina, Muhammad recommended it when sad events happen for its effect on soothing hearts and relieving sadness.
Areekah		Liquid dough is grilled on the griddle, then served in a dish with the addition of ghee and honey in the middle of the dish. It is decorated with dates on the side.
Mifa bread		Oval-shaped bread made of brown flour without any filling, with sesame or nigella seeds on top, giving the bread a distinct taste and flavor when baked.
Heneeth		Heneeth is associated with the well-known sala and markh trees in Asir. It is one of the best-known dishes in the province. Heneeth is often prepared outdoors, in an iron pot or in a sand pit referred to as a mahnaz. After ignition of the firewood in the pit, the heat reaches a high and balanced degree to complete the process of cooking, so the meat is in the best condition. To prepare the dish, a layer of markh plant is put in the iron pot, then meat pieces are added that are then covered with another layer of markh. Finally, a piece of cloth is placed on top before the heneeth is tightly covered. The process of cooking takes between two and three hours. The dish is usually served with rice.
Mathlotha		Mathlotha, traditionally served on special occasions, consists of three essential layers: a hearty wheat-based porridge with vegetables and meat (jareesh), shredded pieces of paper-thin flatbread (qursan), and basmati rice. Chunks of roasted chicken, lamb, or other meat are placed on top of the rice. The layers are arranged on a large circular platter for serving.
al-Raqash		Dough made from barley flour and salt, filled with minced meat, special spices, and tomatoes, is baked on a griddle. Afterwards, some are stacked in a vessel called an al-mudhann and baked further.
Daghabis		Daghabis consists of dough that is placed on broth until it is cooked. It is known for being a rich meal and is considered by some to be heavy on the stomach.
Aseeda		Wheat flour is kneaded with water and a little salt, then served with broth, meat, and sometimes milk and ghee. Its variations differ depending on the region.
Ma'soub		A traditional breakfast meal that became famous in Mecca and Jazan. The name is derived from the word asb, which means 'mixing' or 'mashing', as the ingredients (butter, bread, bananas, and honey) are mashed during cooking. It is cooked in the deep wooden dish (an al-qudhah) in which the ingredients were mixed together. Ma'soub is generally a breakfast dish; some prefer it in the evening, although it is a rich dish. Chefs in Mecca typically use a special type of wheat called hamees, grown in the Taif region and its surroundings, to make the ma'soub, along with local bananas known as zima. It can be served with cream, cheese, dates, or cornflakes.
Mahshoosh		Particularly consumed during Eid al-Adha, this dish is made of lamb cutlets pan-fried in fat and seasoned with cinnamon and salt.
Tasabea		Tasabea is often prepared at traditional events and celebrations. For preparation, it relies on milk and water; to which flour is added, all to be cooked until done. At the end, it is served with margarine, cooked with stone, known as radfa, in its center.
al-Wafd		It is made from Bur (wheat), which is placed in a special container after being baked. It is then pressed by hand to form a ball shape. Afterwards, it is placed in a basket-like vessel called Matrah and served with broth.
Hassawi Rice Kabsa		Hassawi Kabsa is distinguished by its short, red rice grains, known as al-Aish al-Ahmar. Traditionally, the rice is ground using a mortar and pestle and cooked in a copper pot, which acts as a pressure cooker in a process known as Um al-Kaak. However, it is typically cooked nowadays in a regular pressure cooker. The Hassawi Kabsa is similar to the traditional Kabsa, except for the rice preparation method.
Aish al-Jazar		This seasonal recipe is only prepared mid-winter in al-Ahsa when the local markets are filled with red carrots resembling radishes. As the carrots become redder, their price typically increases. It is prepared with dried shrimp and served with boiled eggs.
Maadous		This is a traditional winter dish served in Mecca and Medina. It used to be prepared with rainwater, and families enjoyed it as a celebration of rainfall; as such, it is known as a cloud and rain meal. The dish is made by cooking soaked and drained lentils with washed rice, spices, and chicken or vegetable broth. It is simmered until the broth dries and the ingredients are cooked. It is typically served with a variety of vegetable salads, including onions, fenugreek, and tamarind sauce, to balance the flavors with the taste of Maadous. It is accompanied by pickled lemons and radishes. In a similar way to the main dish, Maadous can be served with dried fish that is grilled until cooked. The origin of the dish can be traced back to the city of Yanbu, located on the Red Sea coast.
Maghaziliyah		The dish derives its name from the word ghazal (spinning), originating from Taif. It is also popular in Mecca, but without meat and with tomatoes, seasoned and caramelized onions instead. This dish is always accompanied by yogurt and cucumber salad. To prepare it, the pulses are boiled in a pot until soft, while the meat is boiled separately in another pot until it cooks and the foam is removed. Salt and bay leaves are added, and once cooked, it is set aside. The rice is cooked in a small pot over medium heat with the meat broth. The yogurt is mixed with cornstarch and half the number of spices. Onions are sautéed with vegetable oil or ghee, then garlic, spices, and meat are added. The pulses are placed on top, followed by the yogurt and flour mixture. Then the rice is added, sprinkled with saffron water, and served hot with boiled eggs and roasted almonds.
Sh'ayriyah		One of the most famous desserts in Mecca is Sh'ayriyah. The name is derived from the word She'er (or hair) due to the resemblance between the strands of vermicelli and hair in their softness. Housewives in the Mecca region used to spend long hours stretching and cutting the vermicelli dough into thin, long threads, which were then cooked in a pan with ghee until they turned golden brown. Hot water was poured over the vermicelli and stirred until the water dried up. Then, a mixture containing milk, saffron, cardamom, sugar, and almonds was prepared and poured over the vermicelli. The dish was left on heat until the vermicelli absorbed all the milk, and it was served hot.
Khaliat Nahl		A dessert made from bread rolls stuffed with cheese and topped with a syrup made from honey.

=== Beverages ===
Traditional coffeehouses (maqha) used to be ubiquitous, but are now being displaced by food-hall-style cafes. According to the Saudi Arabian Cultural Mission, "serving Gahwah (Coffee) in Saudi Arabia is a sign of hospitality and generosity". Traditionally, the coffee beans were roasted, cooled and ground in front of the guests using a mortar and pestle. The host would then add cardamom pods to the coffee beans during the grinding process. Once the coffee was brewed, it would be poured for the guests. Today though, gahwah is not prepared in front of the guests; instead it is elegantly served in a dallah and poured into small cups called finjan.

Yoghurt is normally made into a drink called laban.

Sobia is a cold drink usually made in the Hijaz but now available all over Saudi Arabia, especially during Ramadan. It is made from a light fermented mixture of barley/brown bread, date palm sap, herbs and spices. It may be either white or colored depending on the flavor.

== Regional dishes ==
In January 2024, the Saudi Culinary Commission, which operates under the Ministry of Culture, announced the regional dishes of Saudi Arabia's 13 regions. The following is a list containing Saudi Arabia's regional dishes:

Region	Dish Name	Image	Description
Riyadh	Margaouq		Thin round pieces of whole wheat dough, cooked with a broth made from meat and vegetables such as eggplant, pumpkin, and zucchini
Makkah	Saleeq		Made of boiled rice with meat broth and served with meat on top, to which some add a quantity of milk, mastic, and salt
Al-Madinah	Madini Rice		White steamed rice, topped with tender meat in a rich and flavorful broth, giving it a distinctive red color
Eastern Province	Hassawi Rice		A traditional dish distinguished by its red-colored rice grains, which are renowned for being cultivated in Al-Ahsa
Al-Qaseem	Kleja		Dessert made from whole wheat flour, stuffed with a mixture of sugar, cardamom, cinnamon, ground black lime, local ghee, and ginger
Hail	Keubaibat Hail		A dish made of grape leaves stuffed with rice, cooked with meat, and seasoned with onions, tomatoes, salt, and spices "Sarar Hail"
Northern Borders	Mulayhiya		A dish consisting of rice, meat, and meat broth, with dried yogurt, garnished with parsley and pine nuts
Al-Jouf	Bukayla		A dessert made from equal amounts of "Samh" flour and de-pitted dates, blended together, and a small amount of local ghee may be added
Tabouk	Sayadiah		A dish in which the rice is special by its brown color, from being mixed with onions sautéed in oil.
Al-Baha	Muqana Bread		Whole wheat flour dough, which is rolled out on a heated stone slab over firewood, until it becomes a dark brown color
Aseer	Haneeth		It is a traditional food made of rice and fresh meat, which is placed in special ovens under the ground with "Marakh" herb, and left until cooked
Najran	Ruqsh		Small pieces of whole wheat bread placed in a granite bowl, with meat broth and meat added over it
Jazan	Maghsh		Pieces of meat are placed in a stone pot called "Al-Maghash" and then cooked in the "Al-Meefa" oven

== Fast-food and chain restaurants ==
Chain restaurants have been slow to gain ground in Saudi Arabia, yet are steadily becoming a part of the local cuisine. Although chain restaurants only account for 25% of sales in the service industry, chains have seen far more growth than independent players in recent years. Al Baik, a chain focused on the sale of broasted fried chicken, has led the charge as far as Saudi-owned chains go, and has expanded operations into several neighboring gulf states.

== Islamic dietary laws ==
Islamic dietary laws forbid the eating of pork and the drinking of alcoholic beverages. This law is enforced throughout Saudi Arabia. According to Islamic law, animals must be butchered in a halal way and blessed before they can be eaten.

According to the Saudi Arabian cultural mission,

"guests are served hot coffee and dates as a symbol of generosity and hospitality. The same practice is carried out in the month of Ramadan. Muslims in Saudi Arabia break their fast with dates, water and Arabian coffee. The caffeine in the coffee and the carbohydrates and iron in dates nourishes the fasting person with a lot of energy. This helps them perform the Tarawih held in the evenings during Ramadan."

== See also ==
- Eastern Arabian cuisine
- Ministry of Culture (Saudi Arabia)
