= Mandi (food) =

Arab dish cooked in a pit

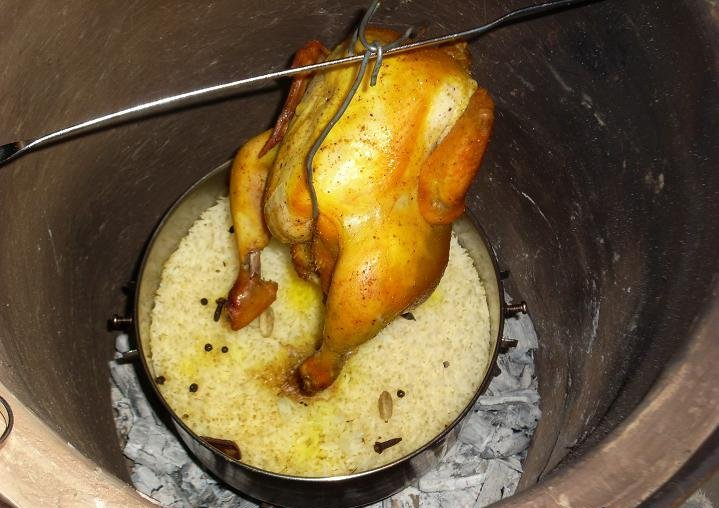
- Chicken is suspended in the air and cooked from the steam and heat under it
- Course: Lunch or dinner
- Place of origin: Arab world
- Variations: Zarb, quzi

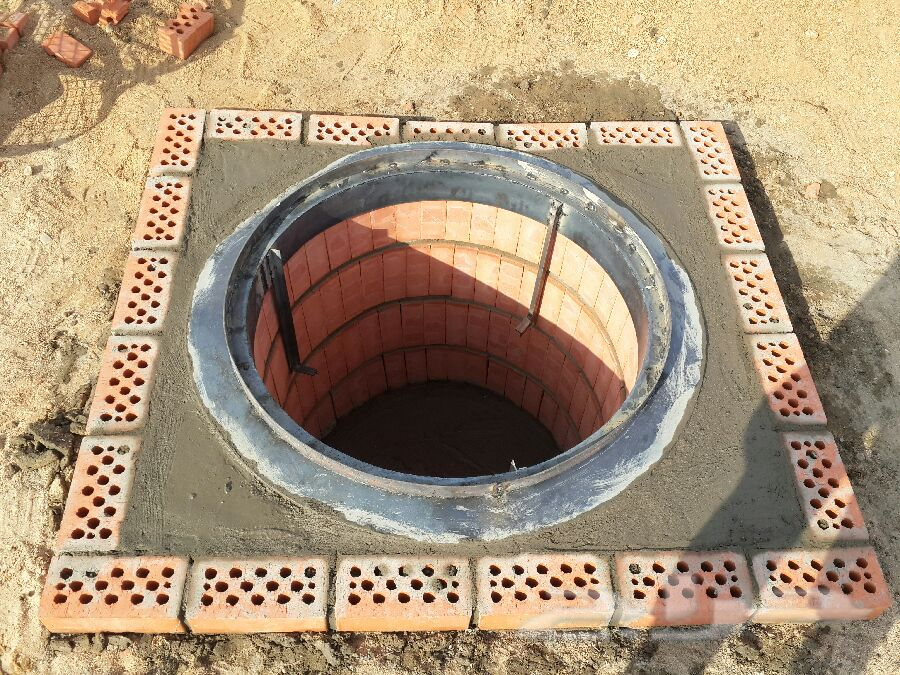
A pit made for cooking Mandi

Mandi (Arabic: مندي, also known as zarb or quzi) is a traditional Arab dish with regional variations across the Arab world. It consists mainly of meat and rice with a blend of spices, and is cooked in a pit. It is consumed in most areas of the Arabian Peninsula and also found in Egypt, Hyderabad Deccan (where many people of Yemeni descent live), the Levant, Southern Iran, Turkey, Kerala, and Southeast Asia.

Mandi is strongly associated with Yemeni cuisine, as it spread from Yemen to many parts of the world. Zarb; a variety of mandi, is strongly associated with the bedouins of Jordan.

== History ==
The 13th-century Aleppan cookbook Kitab al-Wuslah ila l-habib mentions a recipe for roasting whole lamb in an underground pit, food historian Nawal Nasrallah likens this dish to the modern bedouin zarb found in Jordanian cuisine.

Palestinian ethnographer Tawfiq Canaan described zarb in 1927:

Zarb is a roasted sheep, where the whole (when the animal is young) or a part of a sheep is placed in a small freshly-prepared, cave like oven. This oven is heated very strongly, the meat is salted and placed in it after which the oven is hermetically closed.

He also commented that "a holy dbihah should not be prepared as a zarb".

Mandi was introduced to Hyderabadi cuisine by Yemeni migration to Barkas.

== Etymology ==
The word "mandi" comes from the Arabic word "nada" (ندى), meaning "dew", and reflects the moist 'dewy' texture of the meat.

== Technique ==
Mandi was usually made from rice, meat (lamb, camel, goat or chicken), and a mixture of spices called hawaij. The main technique that differentiates mandi from other meat dishes is that the meat is cooked in the tannour.

Dry wood (traditionally samer or gadha) is placed in the tandoor and burned to generate heat turning the wood into charcoal.

The meat is then boiled with whole spices until tender, and the spiced stock is then used to cook the basmati rice at the bottom of the tandoor. The meat is suspended inside the tandoor above the rice and without touching the charcoal. After that, the whole tandoor is then closed with clay for up to eight hours.

== Regional variations ==
Mandi has transcended its Yemeni roots and is now popular in many parts of the Arabian Peninsula, including Saudi Arabia, the UAE, and Egypt. It is also eaten in regions such as the Levant, Turkey, and South Asia, where it is known as "kuzhi mandi" in Kerala, India. Each region often incorporates local spices and cooking methods, leading to unique interpretations of the dish.

=== Iraq ===
Iraqi Quzi is a variety of mandi.

=== Yemen ===
In Yemen, mandi is traditionally served on large communal platters and often accompanied by a tangy tomato sauce, known as zahawig in Yemen or dakoos in Saudi Arabia, which enhances the dish's flavors. Salatah, a fresh vegetable salad, is also commonly served alongside mandi, providing a contrast to the flavors of the meat and rice.

Yemeni mandi was popularized in Karnataka, Telangana and Kerala cuisines through immigration by the Indian diaspora in the Middle East. It also spread to Istanbul, Turkey, by the Yemeni diaspora who fled to Turkey during the Yemeni civil war.

=== The Levant ===
In Jordan and Palestine, mandi is also known as zarb (زرب), and typically involves a variety of meats and vegetables. It is associated with Jordanian Bedouins in Wadi Rum. Palestinian and Jordanian zarb is typically cooked in a large barrel-like tiered utensil made containing metal racks. Palestinian zarb may use chicken, turkey, lamb or beef, typical alongside a variety of vegetables, as many as 20 chickens can be cooked at once in a single batch.

=== Egypt ===
Abu Mardam (Arabic: أبو مردم), also called mandi, is a dish found in Egyptian cuisine made by cooking chicken or duck alongside vegetables in an underground pit, it is in Siwa Oasis.

== Gallery ==
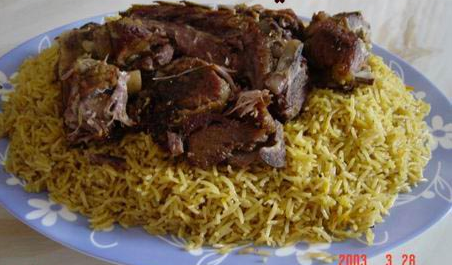
Lamb meat Mandi

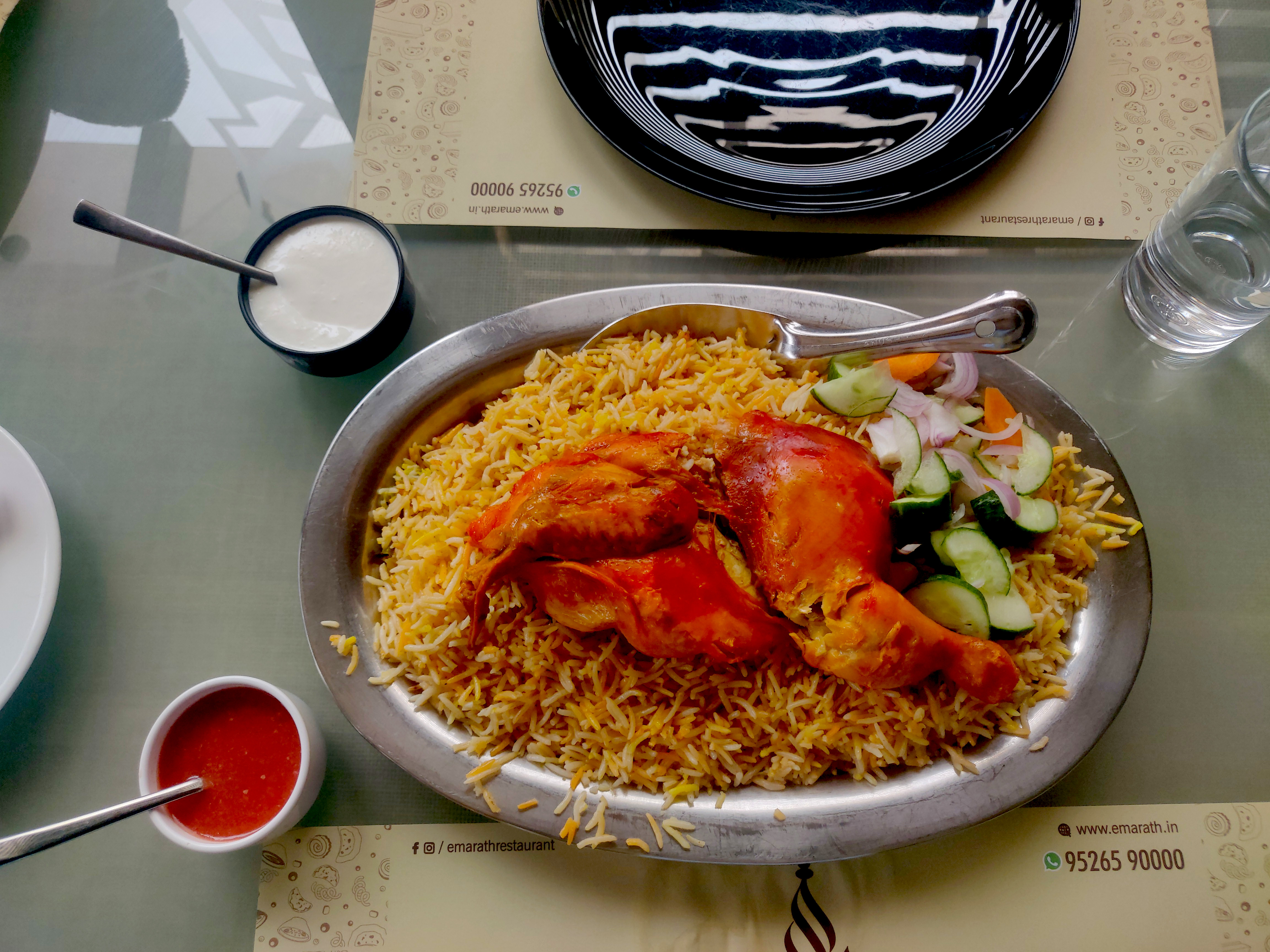
Mandi is popular in Kerala by the name kuzhi mandi

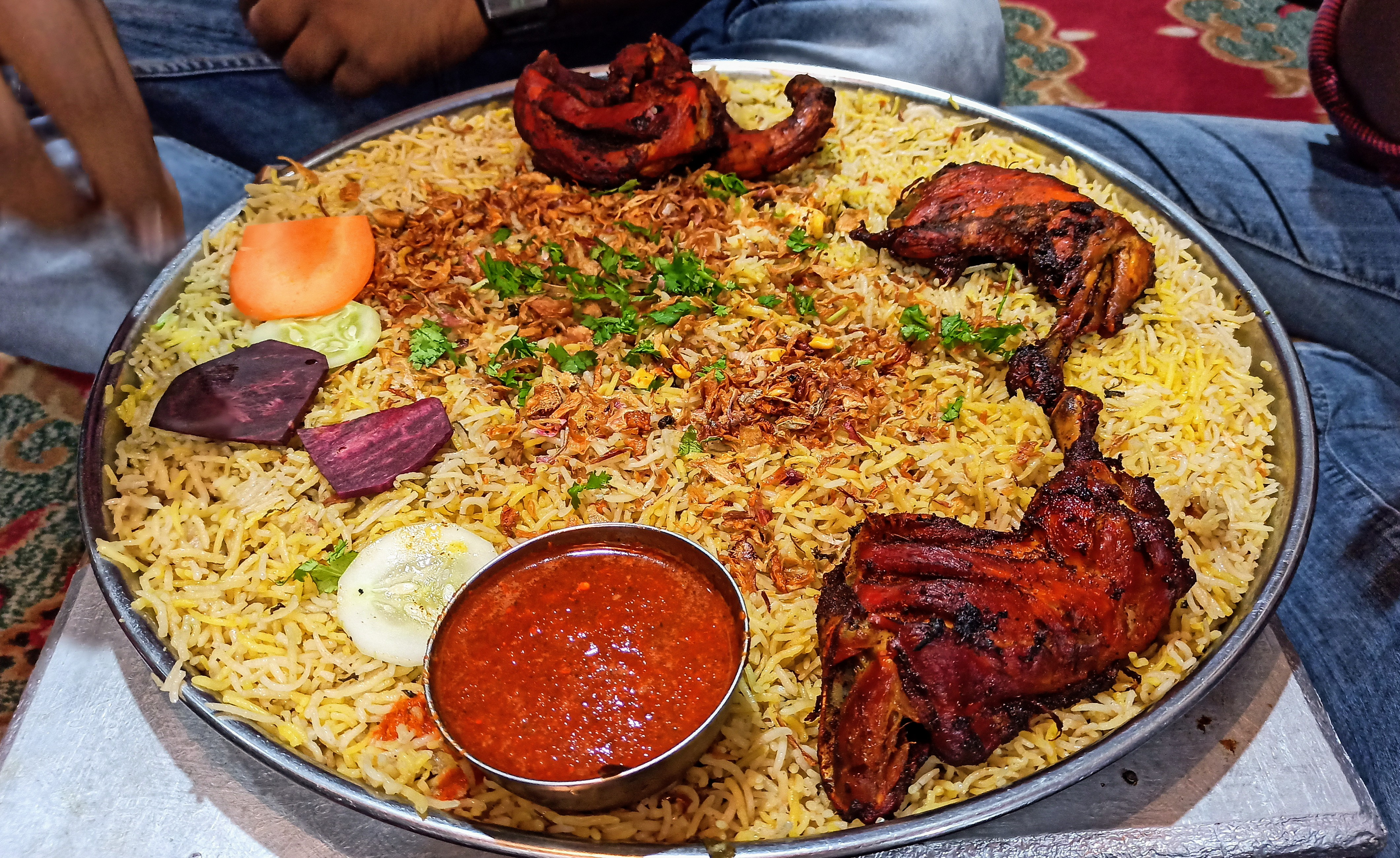
Chicken Mandi in Hyderabad.

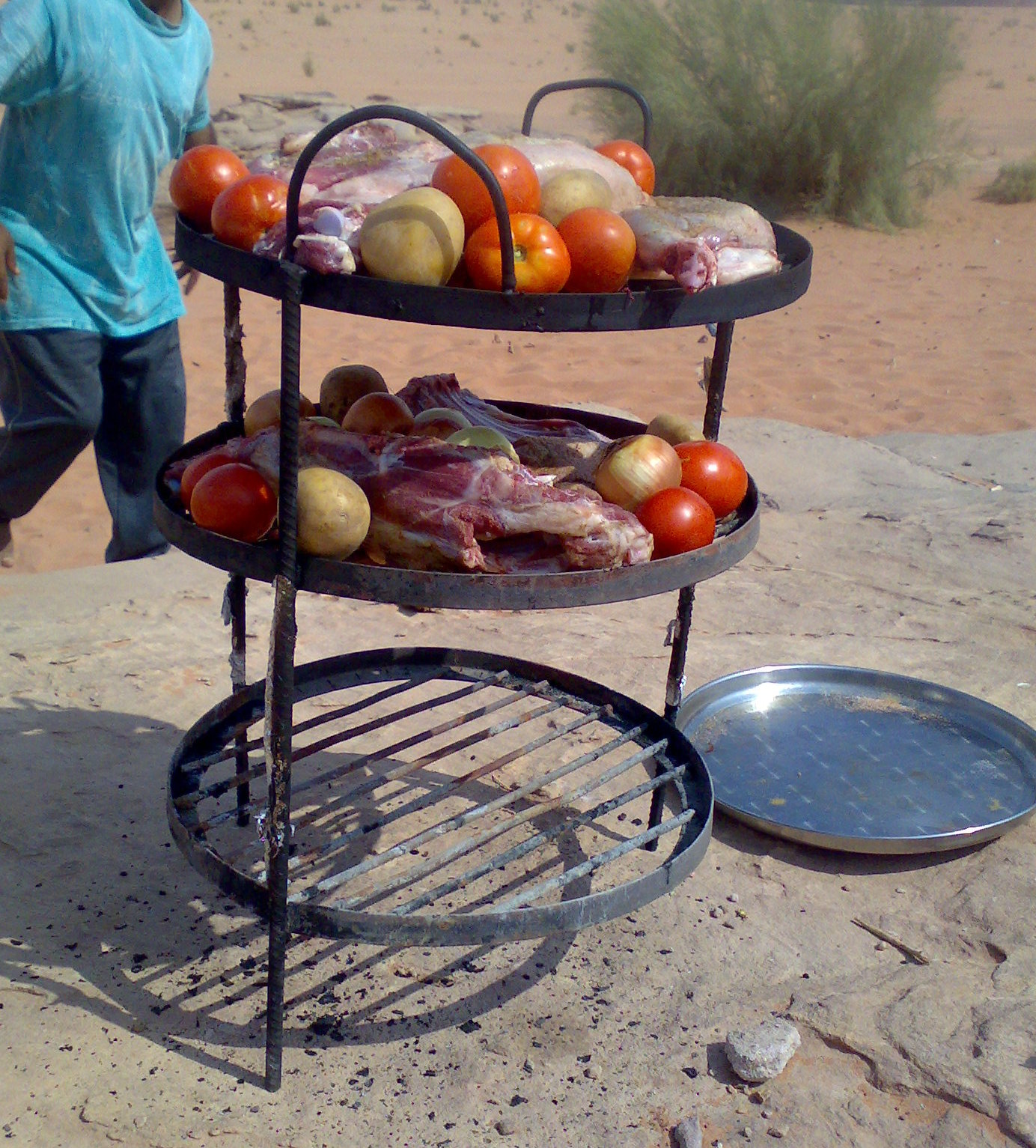
Uncooked zarb, Jordan

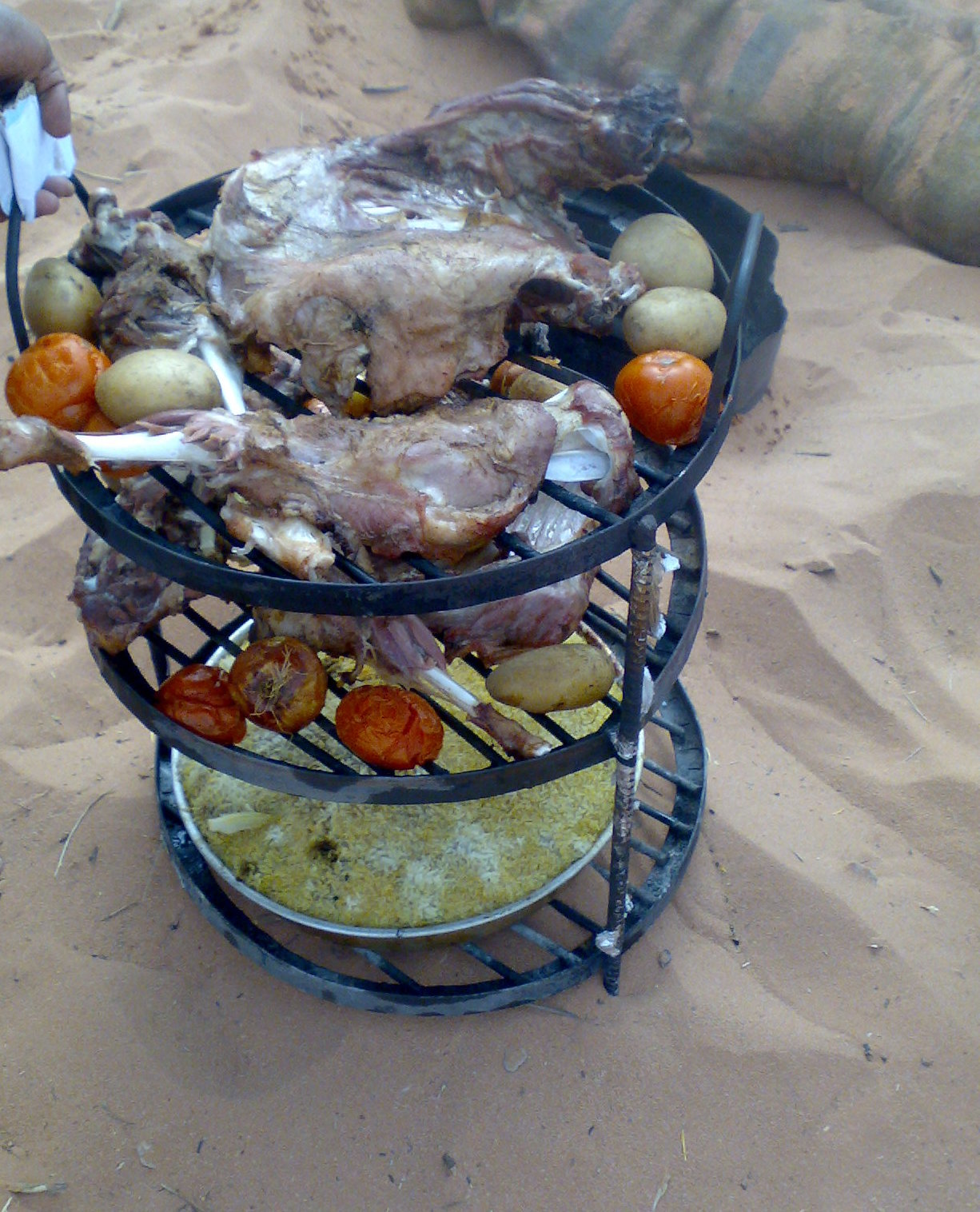
Cooked zarb, Jordan

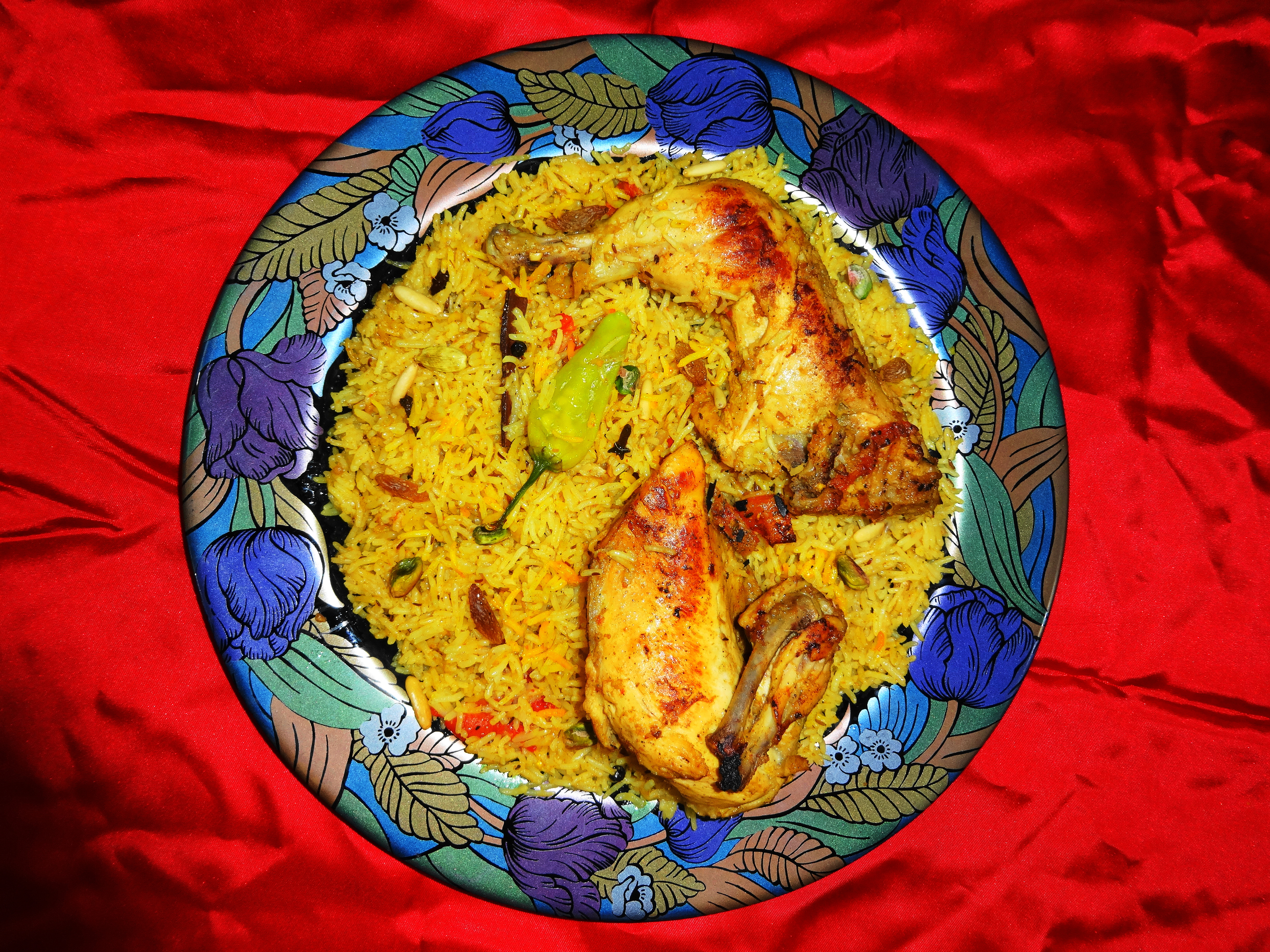
A serving of chicken mandi

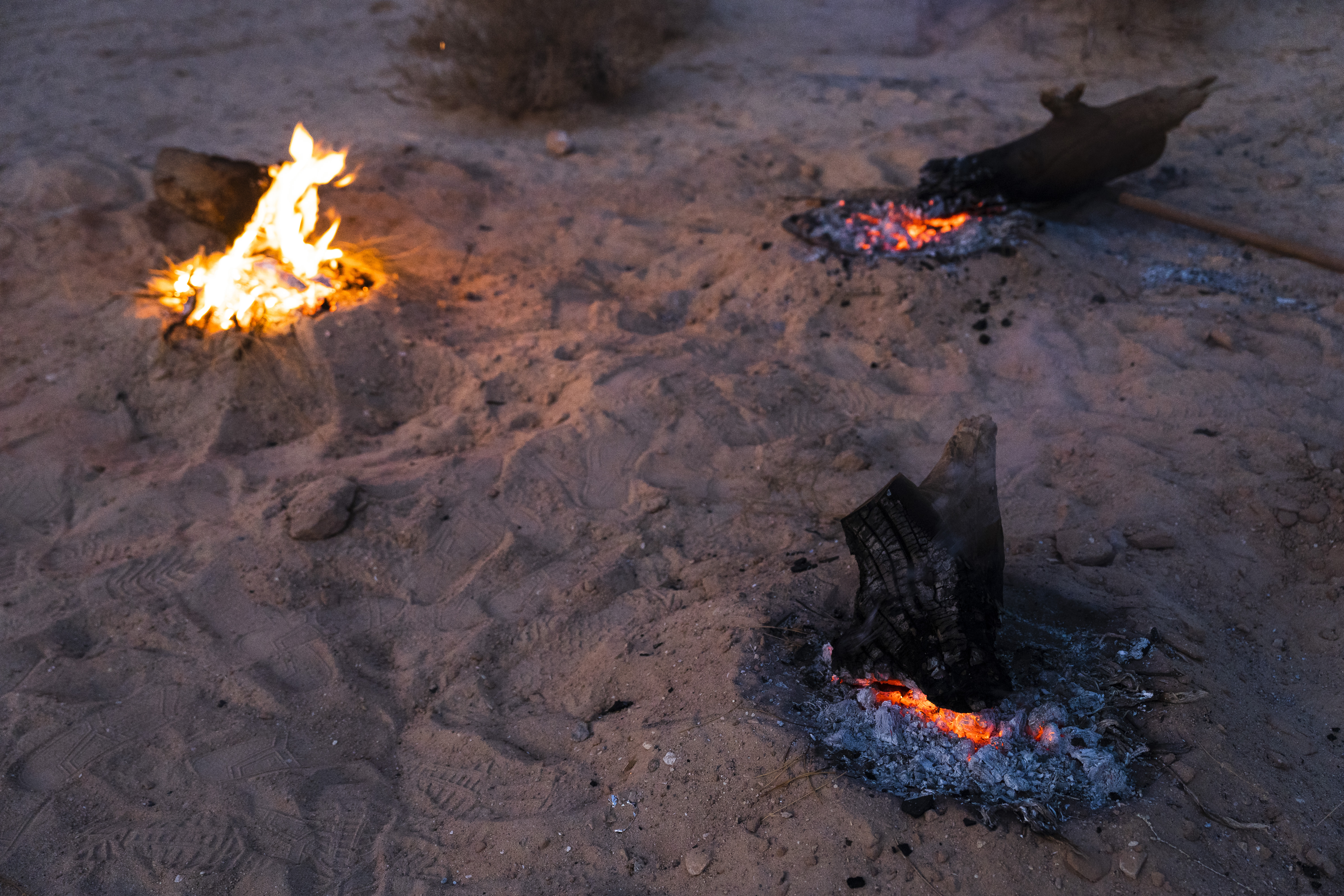
Chicken mandi after being buried, Egypt

== See also ==
- Arroz con pollo
- Biryani
- Haneeth
- Kabsa
- List of rice dishes
- Maqluba
- Mansaf
- Nasi kebuli
- Pilaf
- Paella
- Quzi
- Arab Indonesian cuisine
