= Zorbian =

Yemeni rice dish

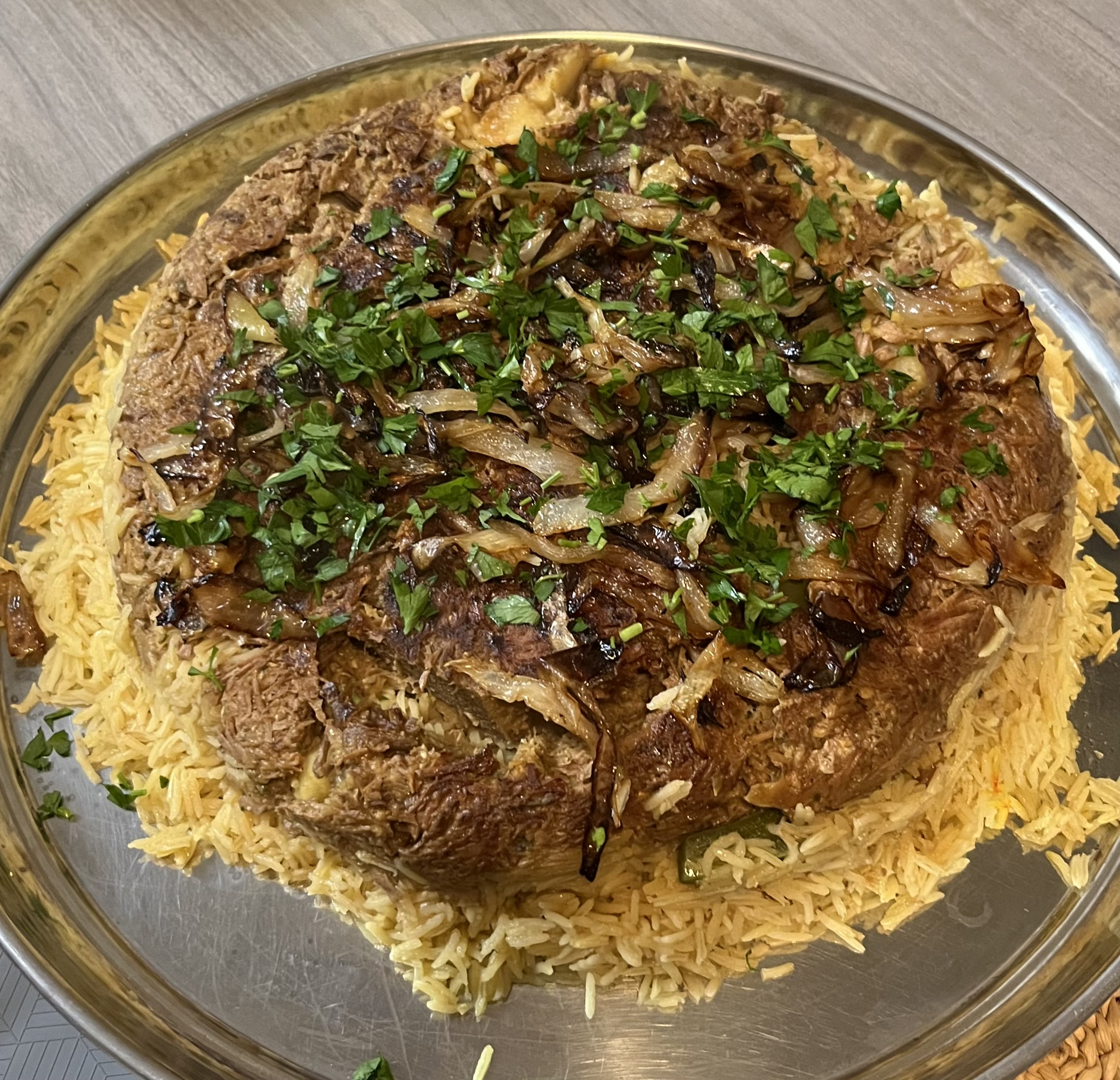
Lamb and potato Zurbian topped with fried onions and parsley

Zorbiyan, Zurbian, or Zorbian, (Arabic: زربيان) is a Yemeni rice dish that mainly consists of either chicken or lamb, potatoes, basmati rice, and Zorbiyan spices. It is commonly served with sahawiq, a vegetable hot sauce. It is nicknamed 'the Yemeni biryani' and is popular throughout Yemen's neighboring countries in the Arabian Peninsula and Somalia.

== Etymology ==
Theories of the origin of this dish's name vary. The most widely accepted view is that Zorbiyan is a combination of a metathesis of the Arabic word roz (Arabic: رز), meaning rice, and biryani (Persian: بریان). A lesser-adopted theory is that Zorbian is related to the term Zarb (Arabic: زرب), which is the name of a lamb dish from the Syrian Desert.

== History ==
Zorbiyan originates in the south of Yemen where it is noted as a descendant of Hyderabadi biryani, a result of the historical Indian community's influences namely during the British Raj.

Since at least the mid-19th century, the dish has gained popularity across the rest of the Arabian Peninsula, and throughout East Africa, especially Somalia. It is now often served at Yemeni restaurants all over the world.

== Preparation and tradition ==
Base ingredients of Zorbiyan include:

- Meat (chicken or lamb) which is plated in large pieces,
- Onions,
- Basmati rice, which is cooked in the meat/chicken broth,
- Potatoes
- A spice mix which may include cumin, cardamom, coriander, turmeric, paprika, cloves, and bay leaves. It is commonly seasoned and colored with saffron.

Zorbiyan is usually made in large portions and served in a circular plate to be shared between multiple enjoyers. It is commonly served as an entrée in Yemeni lunches and dinners, often during special occasions such as weddings, Eid al-Fitr, Eid al-Adha, and for Ramadan meals.

Zorbiyan is commonly sided with ʿoshar and garnished with parsley and sliced almonds.
