= Khaliat nahl =

Arabian sweet bread dish

Khaliat al Nahl
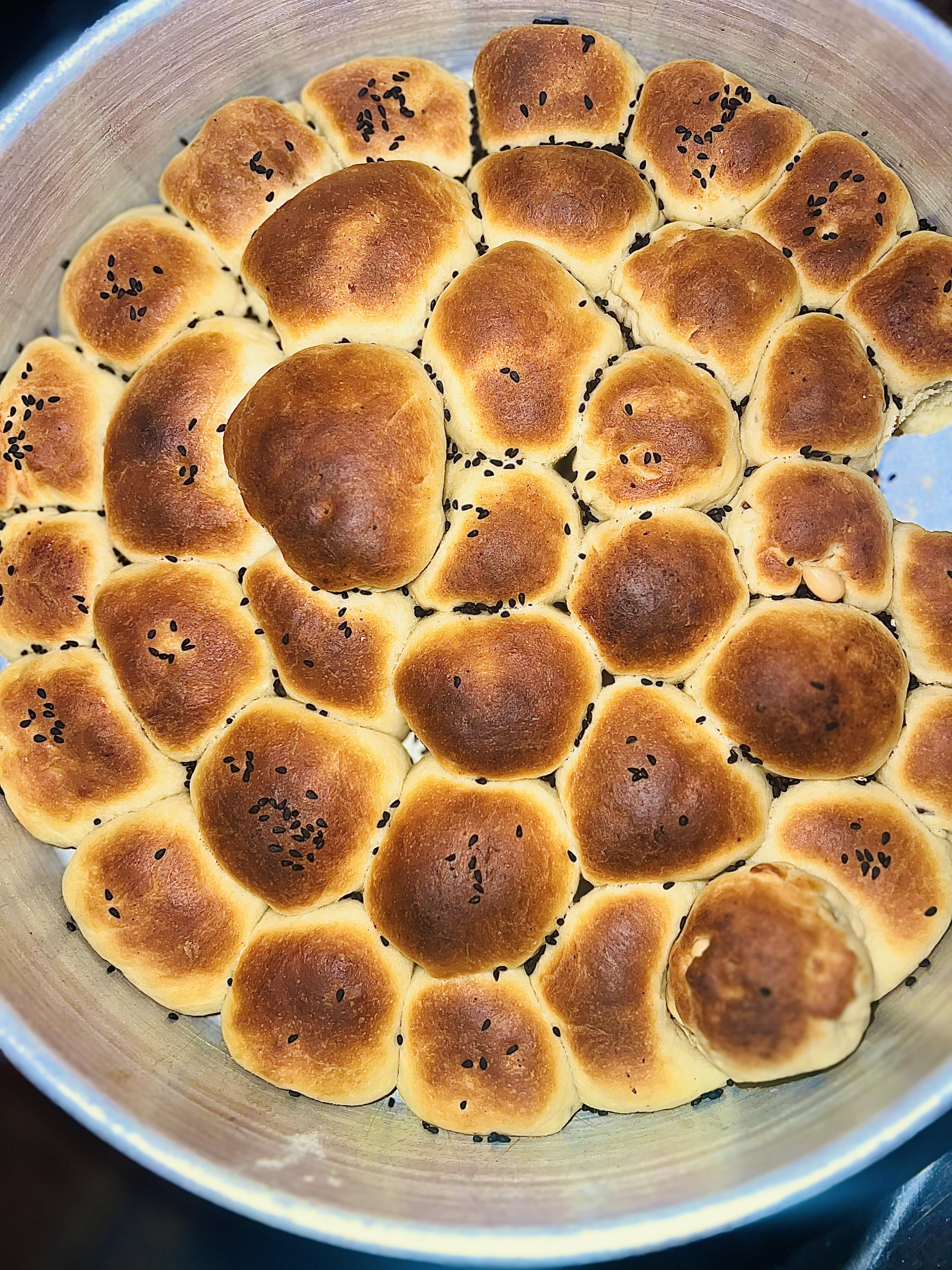
- Khaliat al-Nahl, before the syrup is added
- Alternative names: Honeycomb bread, Beehive Buns
- Course: Dessert, snack
- Place of origin: Arabian Peninsula
- Serving temperature: Warm or room temperature
- Main ingredients: Enriched dough, cheese, sugar syrup or honey

Khaliat al Nahl (Arabic: خليّة النحل, lit. 'Beehive'), also called Khaliat Nahl, or Honeycomb Bread in English, is an Arab dessert made of small, soft, cheese-filled bread rolls arranged in a pattern similar to hexagonal packing arrangement, resembling a honeycomb or beehive, and topped with nigella seeds and honey or syrup. It is associated with Arabian cuisine, specifically Yemeni cuisine.

== Ingredients and preparation ==
The dough for the bread rolls is leavened with yeast to give it its soft texture. The rolls are typically brushed with egg wash before baking and glazed with sugar syrup or honey once out of the oven, sesame and nigella seeds are ubiquitous toppings as well.

Common fillings include cream cheese, processed cheese, or traditional soft white cheeses.

The syrup will typically be sweetened with honey and contains orange juice or orange flower water added to it, similar to qatir.

== Popularity ==
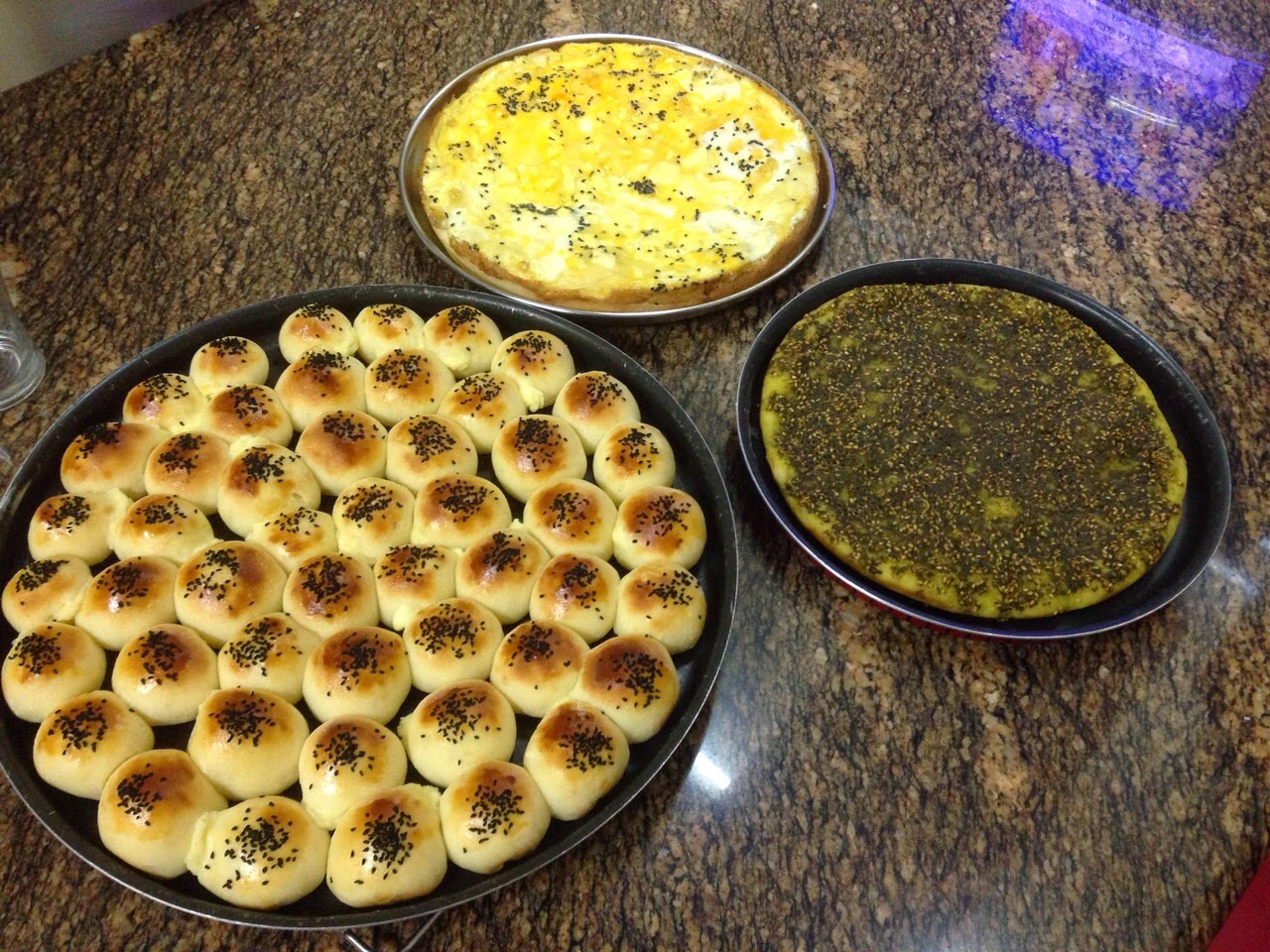
Khaliat al-Nahl in Jordan in the bottom left, next to some manakish

Honeycomb bread is popular in much of the Arab world, and especially common in the Arabian Peninsula. It is often served as a dessert or snack, and is especially popular during the month of Ramadan.

In Oman, the dessert is popular during Qaranqasho.

In the United States, Yemeni-style coffeehouses have popularized the dish.

The texture of the bread is described as "soft", "pillowy", and "fluffy".

== Similar dishes and variations ==
In Somali cuisine, rooti farmaajo is a similar dish, it is topped with shredded coconut and milk instead of syrup.

== See also ==
- List of Middle Eastern dishes
- Kubaneh
- Bint al-sahn
- Fatayer
- Challah
- Mouna
- Bread roll
