= Khubz mulawah =

Yemeni flatbread

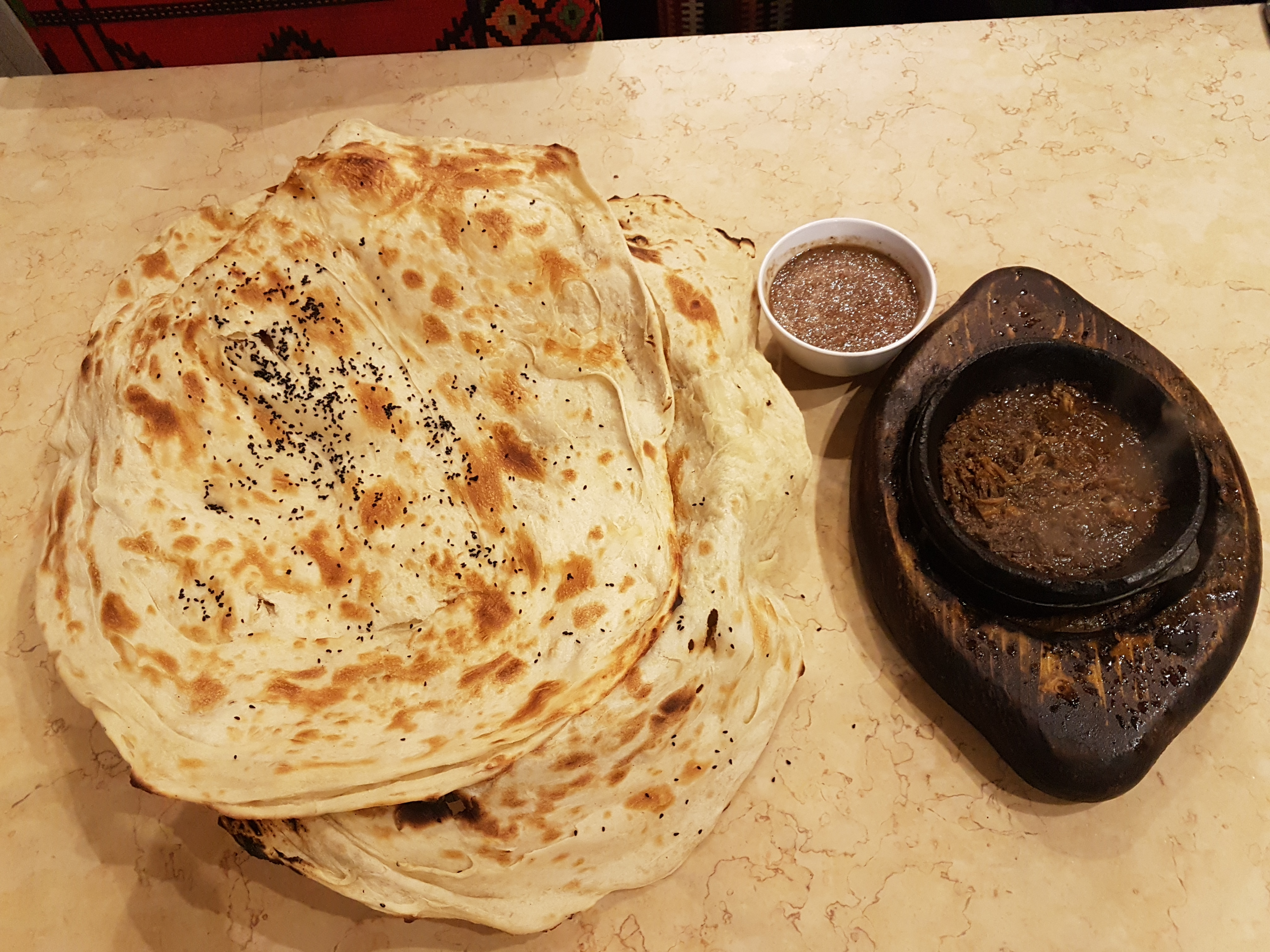
- Mulawah next to fahsa and sahawaq
- Alternative names: Mulawah, khobz mulawah
- Type: Bread
- Place of origin: Yemen
- Main ingredients: Puff pastry, Nigella sativa, ghee or oil

Khubz mulawah (Arabic: خبز ملوح), mulawah (Arabic: ملوح), or rashush (Arabic: رشوش) is a flatbread that is baked in a traditional tannur in Yemeni cuisine. A similar bread, malawach, has been brought to Israel by Yemenite Jews. The bread is prepared by folding it into layers using butter or ghee.

Khubz mulawah is often eaten for breakfast with ghee and honey on weekends.

== Etymology ==
Both mulawah and Lahoh terms come from the Arabic root (l-w-ḥ) which means the thing that is flat.

== See also ==
- Yemeni cuisine
- Arab cuisine
- Shafoot
- Fatoot
- Zhug
