= Saltah =

Traditional Yemeni food

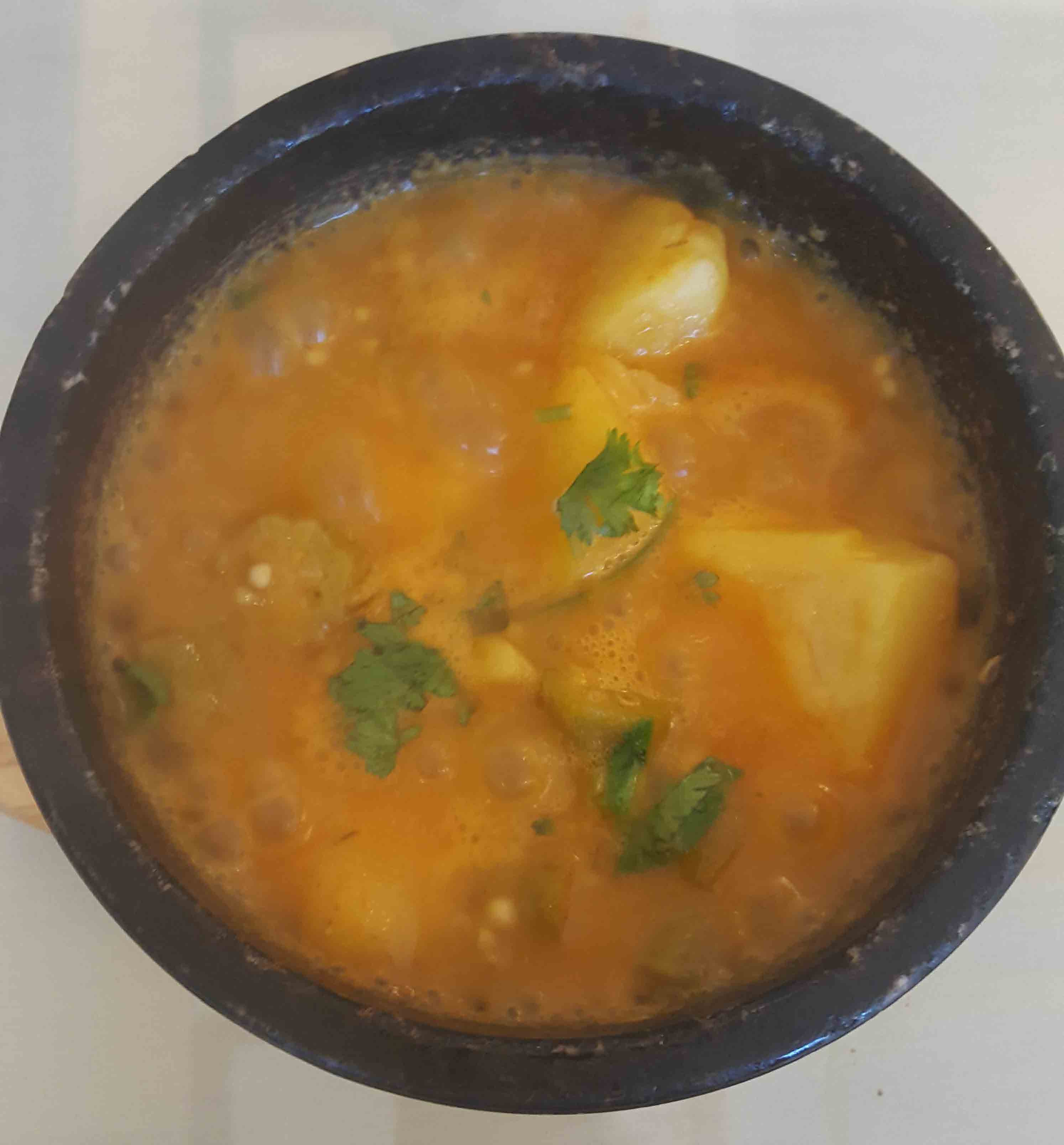
- Bowl of saltah
- Type: Stew
- Place of origin: Yemen
- Region or state: Yemen
- Main ingredients: Maraq, fenugreek, sahawiq (chillies, tomatoes, garlic, and herbs)

Saltah (Arabic: سلتة) is a traditional Yemeni dish. Saltah is considered to be the national dish of Yemen. In the Ottoman Empire, saltah was used as a charitable food and was made with leftover food that was donated by the wealthy or the mosques. It is widely eaten in northern parts of the country. It is mainly served for lunch. The base is a brown meat stew called maraq, a dollop of fenugreek froth, and sahawiq (a mixture of chillies, tomatoes, garlic, and herbs ground into a salsa). Rice, potatoes, scrambled eggs, sambal and vegetables are common additions to saltah. It is eaten traditionally with khubz mulawah, a Yemeni flatbread used as a utensil to scoop up the dish.

== See also ==
- List of stews
- Arab Indonesian cuisine
