= Bint al-sahn =

Yemeni pastry

Bint al-Saḥn
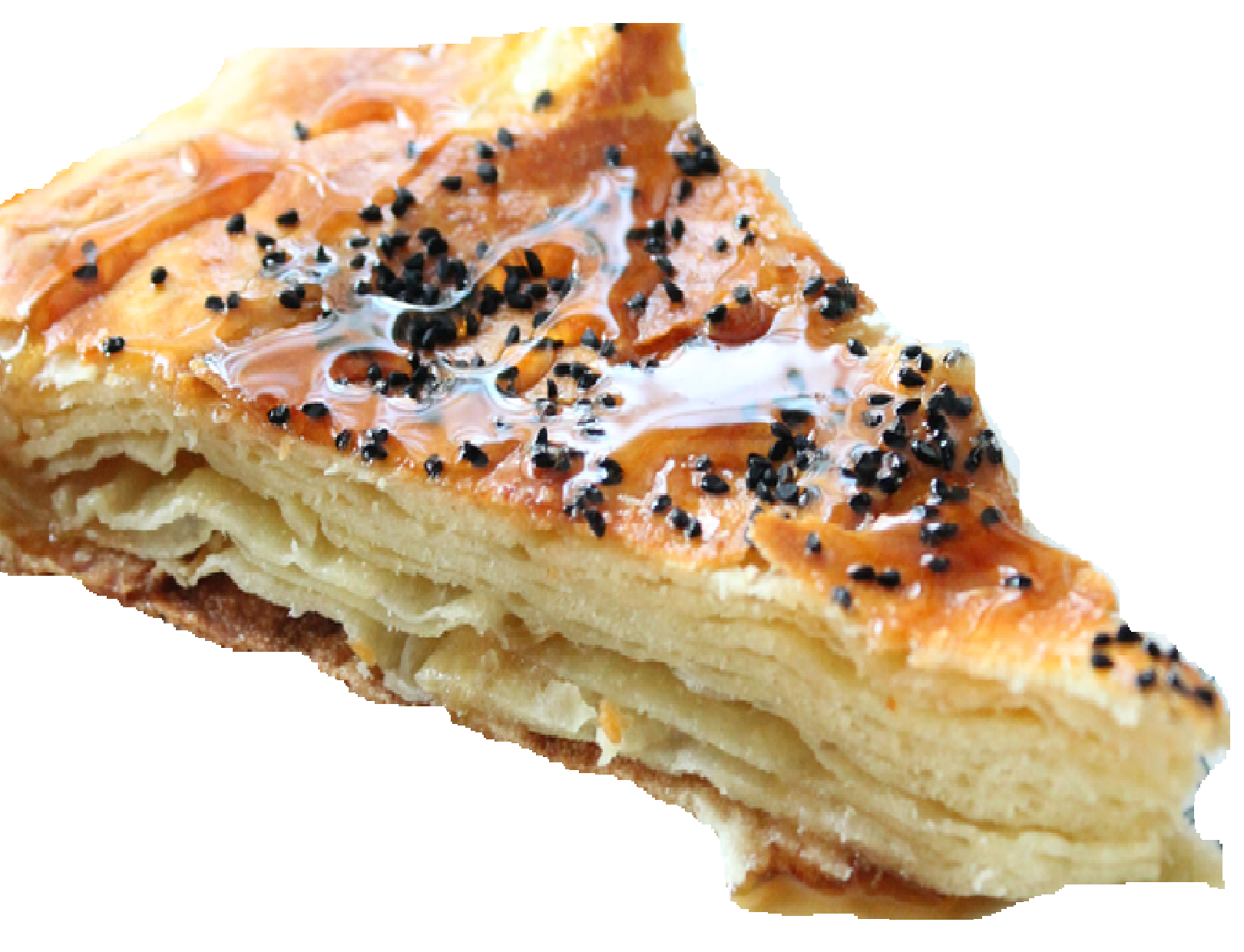
- Bint al-Saḥn
- Place of origin: Yemen
- Main ingredients: white flour, eggs, vanilla extract, baking powder and cinnamon

Bint al-sahn (Arabic: بنت الصحن, romanized: Bint as-Saḥn, lit. 'daughter of the plate'), also known as sabayah, is a Yemeni pastry made from a dough, which is prepared by mixing white flour, eggs, yeast and clarified butter, known as samn (سمن). It is baked in multiple layers and typically served with honey and sprinkled with habbat as sowda (Nigella sativa, black cumin).

Bint al-sahn is one of the most popular Yemeni dishes (along with shai haleeb). It is often translated as honey cake into English, but in reality falls more under the category of a rich, flaky pastry which is served with honey and melted ghee. Like most breads, it is best served fresh and warm. Despite the simple ingredients, making the dough is technically challenging. For this reason, it is rarely found in Yemeni restaurants and it is something which is most often made at home. The most important thing is that the layers need to be paper-thin. In order to achieve this, the dough needs to be the right consistency and the dough balls must be allowed to relax so that it becomes easy to toss them out.

== See also ==
- Yemeni cuisine
- List of desserts
