= Maluj =

Yemeni flatbread

- Type: Flatbread
- Place of origin: Yemen
- Main ingredients: Flour, water, yeast, salt, fenugreek

Maluj (Arabic: ملوج) or Malooga (Arabic: ملوجة) is a leavened Yemeni flatbread eaten with bean dishes, scrambled eggs, spiced buttermilk, and many other Yemeni savory dishes.

Maluj is typically made with flour, cooking oil, yeast, fenugreek, and salt.
