= Qaranqasho =

Mid-Ramadan children's celebration in Oman

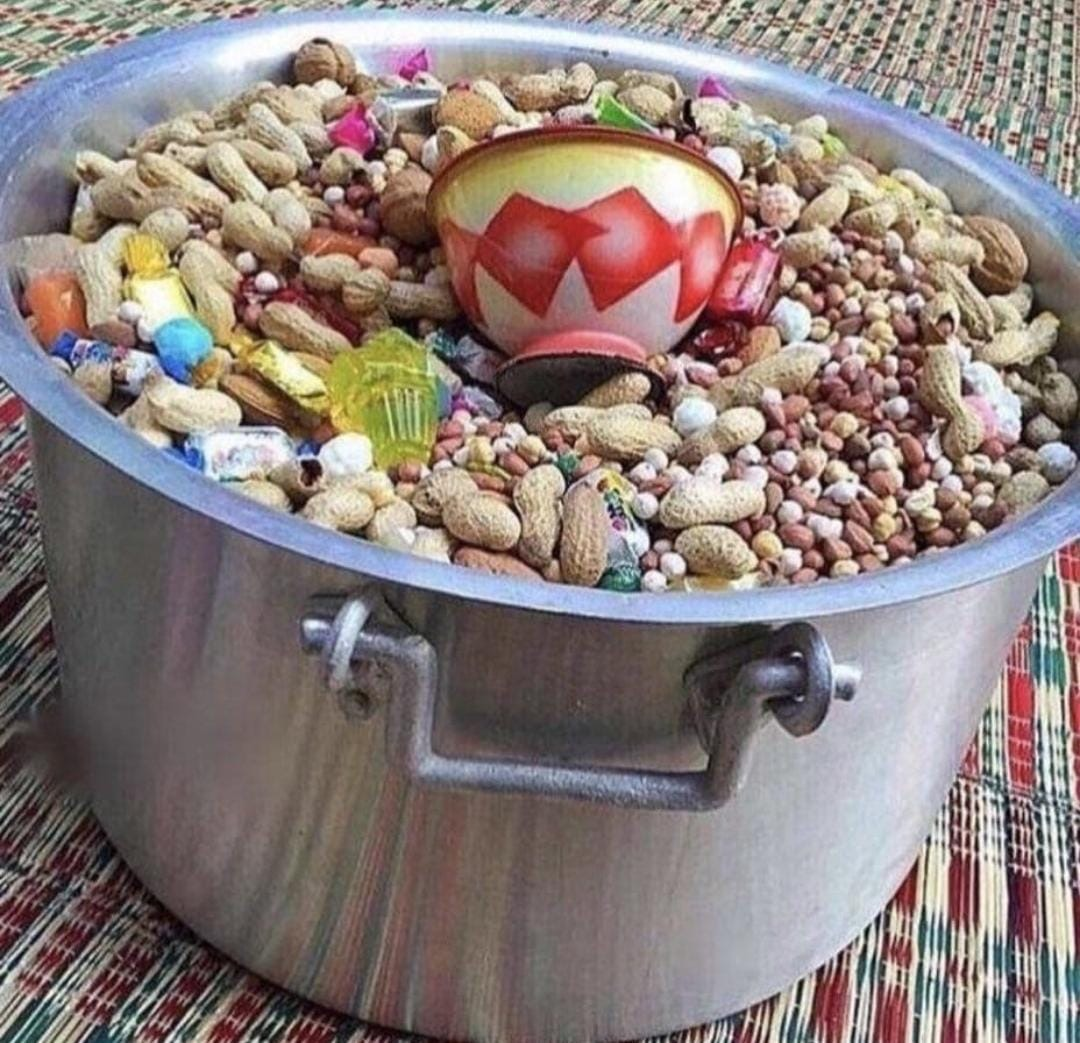
A Qaranqasho pot composed of candy and nuts

Qaranqasho (Arabic: القرنقشوه), also known in northern Oman as Tog (Arabic: طوق), is an annual traditional children’s celebration observed in the Sultanate of Oman, where on the night before the 15th day, or half-way through Ramadan, children celebrate by wearing traditional costumes and going door-to-door through their neighbourhoods and villages singing songs and collecting candy, nuts, money, and halwa. In the past, children used to carry shells and beat them against each other while singing. This celebration started as a way to reward children for successfully fasting for the first half of the month, and to encourage them to continue through the second half.

== Etymology ==
Qaranqasho is derived from the Omani colloquial term Qarqash, meaning "give me."

== Tradition ==
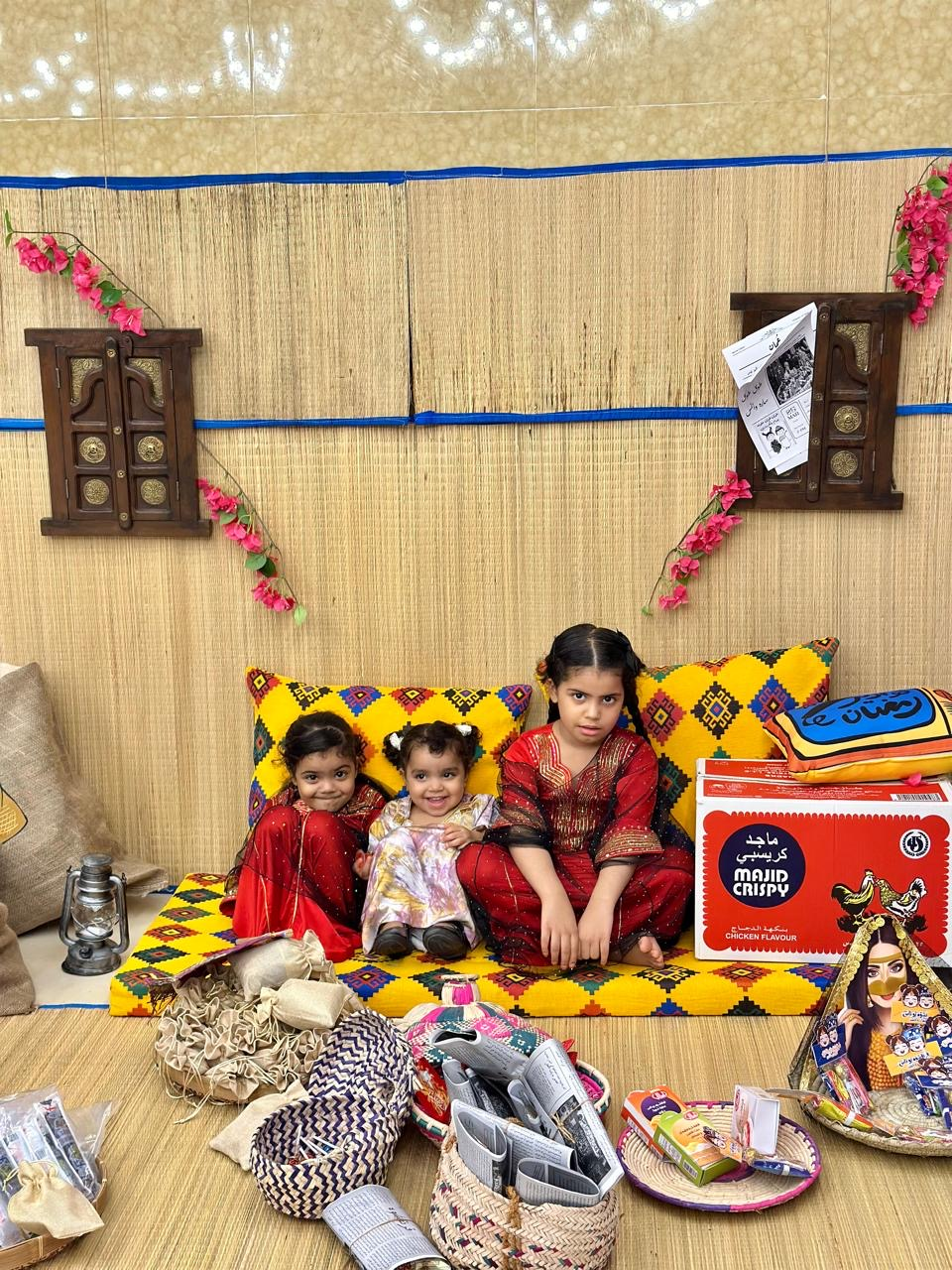
Three girls at a Qaranqasho celebration in Harmul

Qaranqasho is a deeply rooted Omani cultural tradition, celebrated annually during the middle of the holy month of Ramadan. Anticipated with enthusiasm by both children and adults, preparations for the festival begin several days in advance. On the night of the celebration, children don elaborately tailored and brightly colored traditional attire, chosen with care to reflect cultural pride and festive spirit.

Following the Maghrib prayer, children embark on a neighborhood procession that lasts until approximately 11:30 PM. They then visit homes in their community, singing the traditional Qaranqasho chant: "Qaranqasho ya nas, ‘atuna shwayat halwa," which translates to "It is Qaranqasho time, give us some sweets." This is repeated at each household as children collect a variety of treats—typically sweets, nuts, and occasionally small sums of money, offered in festively wrapped packages. After completing the procession, the children come together to exchange treats and chat with one another, often comparing who managed to collect the most sweets.

Historian Ahmed al Farsi offered insights into how Qaranqasho is celebrated differently across Oman. “In Muscat and other urban areas, Qaranqasho has become a larger public celebration with organised get-togethers in neighbourhoods. In contrast, rural areas still maintain a more intimate, family-centred celebration, where children walk from house to house, often covering great distances to visit each home in their community. Regardless of the setting, the core values of the event remain unchanged – togetherness, generosity, and family.”
