= Kabsa =

Arab rice dish

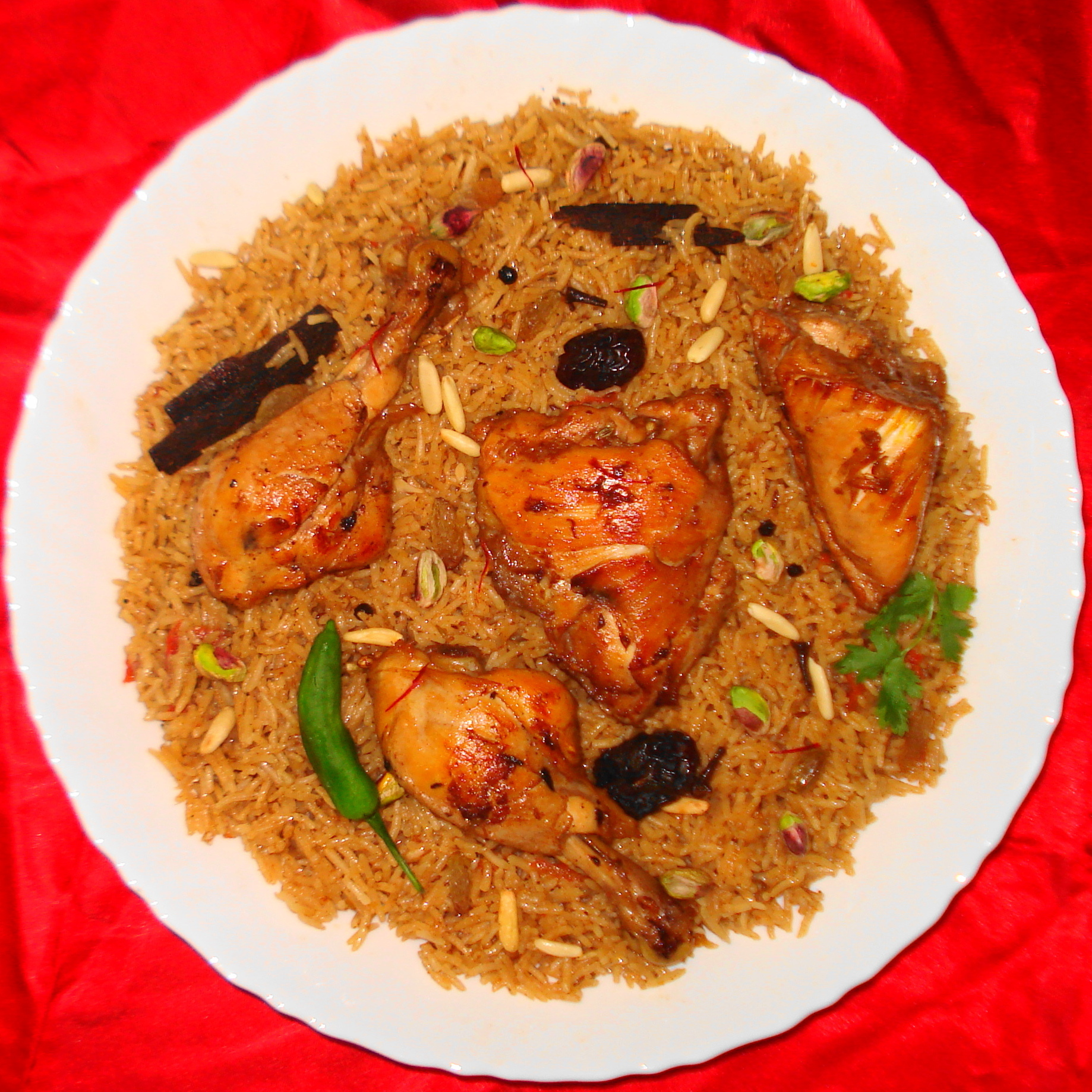
- Alternative names: Arabic: كبسة
- Course: Meal
- Region or state: Arabian Peninsula
- Main ingredients: Rice (usually long-grain, almost always basmati), chicken, vegetables, and a mixture of spices (cardamom, saffron, cinnamon, black lime, bay leaves and nutmeg)
- Variations: Machboos (Arabic: مكبوس/مچبوس, romanized: makbūs/machbūs)

Kabsa (Arabic: كبسة, romanized: kabsah), also known as Makboos (Gulf Arabic: مكبوس) or Machboos (Gulf Arabic: مچبوس [mətʃˈbuːs]), is an Arab mixed rice dish that originates from Saudi Arabia or Yemen. It is commonly regarded as a national dish in all the countries of the Gulf Cooperation Council. It can also be found in regions such as southern Iran and Gaza in Palestine.

== History ==
The dish's origins are contested, with several theories as to its origin. It is believed that the Kabsa was prepared by Bedouin tribes who roamed the deserts of the Arabian Peninsula. They relied on simple and readily available ingredients: rice, meat (usually lamb or chicken), and a blend of spices. Another theory is that the Kabsa is inspired from another Yemeni dish, the mandi, a rice dish cooked with meat in a pit. A third theory says that the dish was inspired from the Paella, a Spanish rice dish that used to be prepared by the Andalusians.

Over time, as trade routes expanded and new ingredients became accessible, variations of kabsa began to emerge. Each region in Saudi Arabia has its own version of kabsa. Despite these differences, the essence remains—the combination of rice, meat, and aromatic spices.

In 2021, the Ministry of Culture of Saudi Arabia, announced an initiative to promote Kabsa as part of its national heritage.

== Etymology ==
The name comes from the Arabic root k-b-s (Arabic: ك ب س), literally meaning to press or squeeze, alluding to the technique used in the cooking where the ingredients are all cooked in (or "squeezed into") one pot.

== Ingredients ==
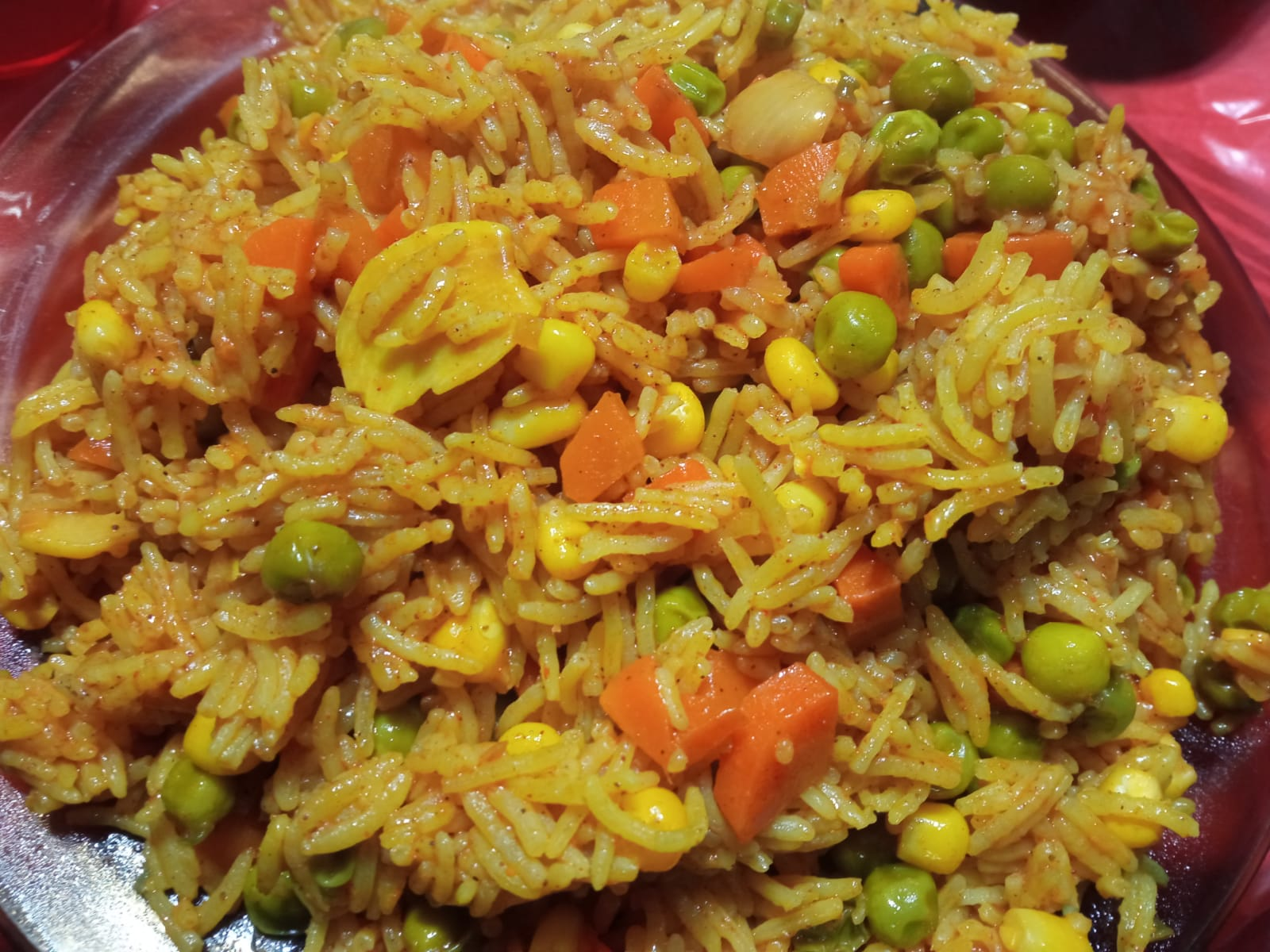
The Palestinian kabsa, consisting of rice, vegetables, and some spices added to it. It is served with grilled chicken.

These dishes, of which there are many variations, are usually made with rice (usually basmati), meat, vegetables, and a mixture of spices.

Pre-mixed kabsa spices are now available under several brand names. These reduce preparation time, but may have a flavor distinct from traditional kabsa. The spices used in kabsa are largely responsible for its taste. These are generally black pepper, cloves, cardamom, saffron, cinnamon, black lime, bay leaves and nutmeg.

The main ingredient that accompanies the spices is the meat. The meats used are usually chicken, goat, lamb, camel, beef, fish or shrimp. In chicken machbūs, a whole chicken is used.

The spices, rice, and meat may be augmented with almonds, pine nuts, peanuts, onions, and sultanas. The dish can be garnished with ḥashū (Arabic: حشو) and served hot with daqqūs (Arabic: دقّوس), which is a home-made Arabic tomato sauce.

== Methods of cooking ==
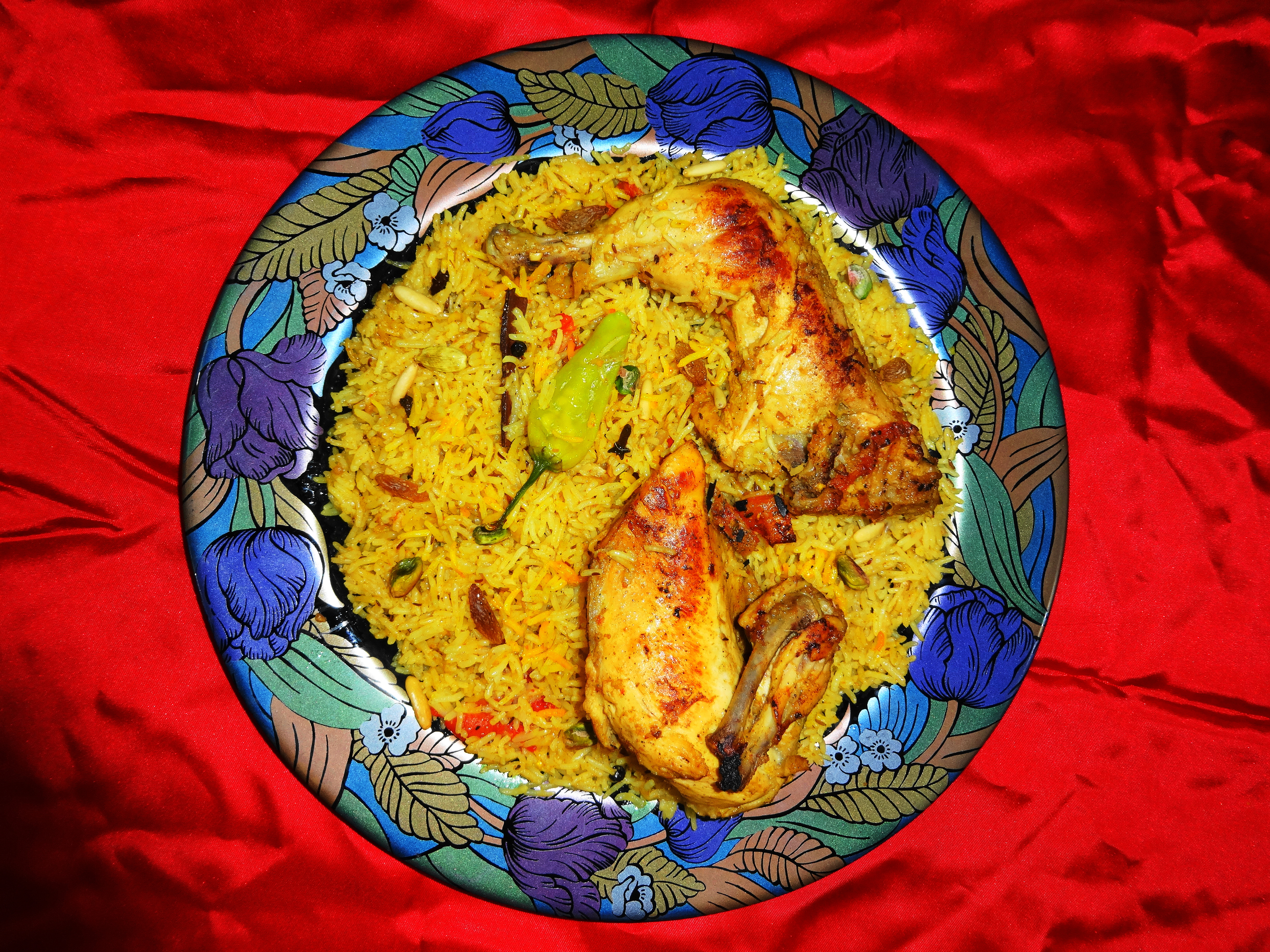
Mandi is one of the most popular ways of eating this dish. It originates from Yemen.

Meat for kabsa can be cooked in various ways. A popular way of preparing meat is called mandi. This ancient technique originates from Yemen, and involves a type of earth oven called the tannor, whereby a whole lamb meat is barbecued in a deep hole in the ground that is then covered while the meat cooks. Another way of preparing and serving meat for kabsa is mathbi, where seasoned meat is grilled on flat stones that are placed on top of burning embers. A third technique, madghūt, involves cooking the meat in a pressure cooker.

== See also ==
- Haneeth, mixed rice dish from Yemen
- Maqluba, mixed rice dish from the Levant
- Arab cuisine
- National symbols of Saudi Arabia
- National symbols of Kuwait
