= Shahi haleeb =

Yemeni beverage made from milk and tea

- Alternative names: Shai haleeb, shai Adeni, shai mulaban, haleeb shai
- Type: Milk tea
- Place of origin: Yemen
- Region or state: Yemen
- Main ingredients: Black tea powder, condensed or evaporated milk, cardamom pods, cloves

Shahi haleeb, Shai Adeni, or shai mulaban is Yemeni milk tea. It is made from black tea powder brewed in condensed or evaporated milk. Cardamom pods and cloves are usually added to the tea; some recipes include added sugar, honey, or saffron. The tea has a very sweet taste and is popular in Yemen and parts of the Arabian Peninsula.
