= Fatoot =

Yemeni bread dish

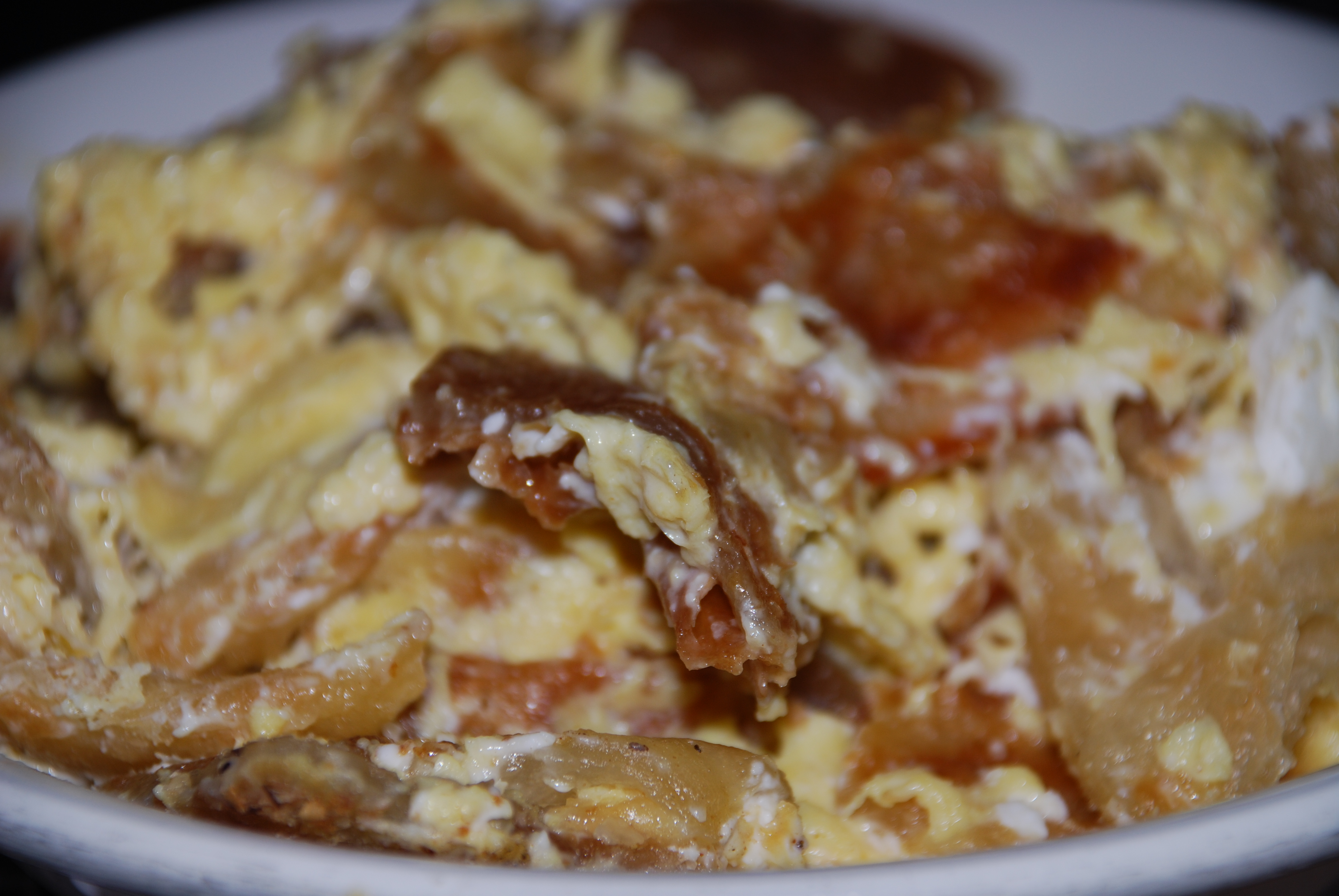
- Fatut of fried bread with eggs
- Type: Bread dish
- Place of origin: Yemen

Fatoot (Arabic: فتوت, romanized: Fatoot or Fatut) is a group of Yemeni dishes based on shredded bread. Fatoot is commonly served as a side dish or breakfast item, especially during the Islamic holiday of Ramadan.
