= Masoob =

Yemeni dessert dish

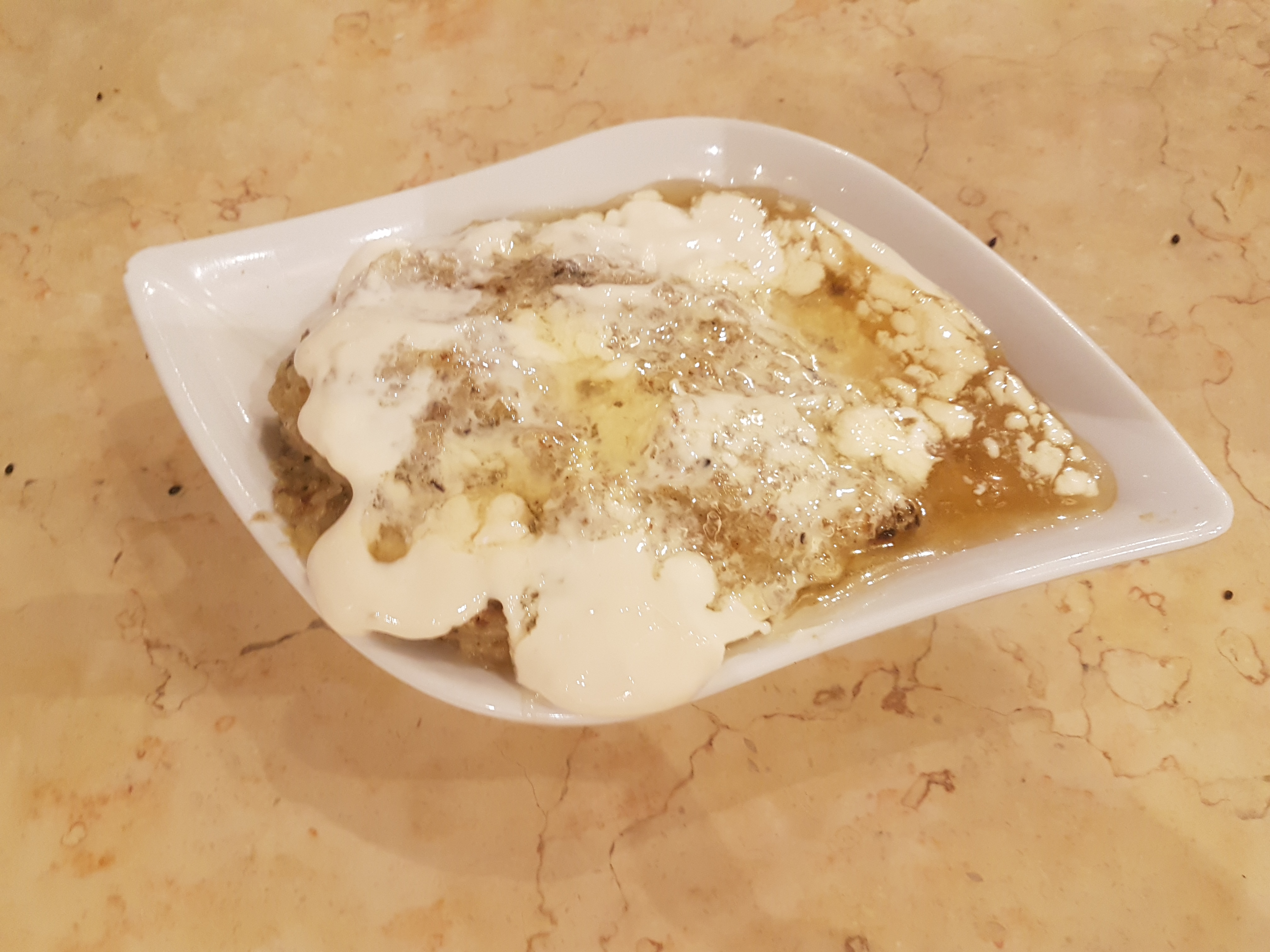
- Alternative names: Masoub, Malikia, Fattah
- Place of origin: Hadhramaut, Yemen
- Main ingredients: Over-ripe bananas, ground flat bread, cream, cheese, dates, and honey.

Masoob (Arabic: معصوب) is a traditional banana-based pudding from the Hadhramaut region in Yemen. It is made from over-ripe bananas, ground flat bread, cream, cheese, honey, and sometimes dates. It is popular in other Arab states like Saudi Arabia and the UAE, where Hadhrami immigrant communities introduced the dish.

== Description ==
Masoob is a bread pudding prepared with mashed bananas, honey, and cream along with whole wheat bread. The dish combines richness from the cream, sweetness from the bananas and honey, and an earthy flavour from the bread. Masoob is eaten both as a dessert and for breakfast.

== Health Benefits ==
Being rich in dietary fiber, healthy fats, and carbohydrates, Masoob is a wholesome breakfast choice. Additionally, it contains bananas that provide good amounts of potassium, which is necessary for controlling fluid balance, nerve impulses, and muscular contractions.

== Variations ==
Masoob comes in many different varieties. Some variations have reduced cream content for a lighter breakfast. Other, more indulgent forms are made with additional cream and nuts. Additional styles include dates, almonds, raisins, or cheese.

== Recipe ==
Masoob is a very easy dish to prepare. Typically, it just requires a few ingredients like ripe bananas, whole wheat flatbread or Arabic bread, cream (qishta or table cream), honey, and Ghee or melted butter which is optional.

The mashed bananas are mixed with the crumbled bread, milk, honey, and optional ghee or butter. The combination is then served and topped with a dab of yogurt or clotted cream.

== Cultural Significance ==
Masoob is a communal dish that is often served on huge platters. This serving style makes it a common centerpiece for shared feasts.
