= Shafoot =

Traditional Yemeni appetizer

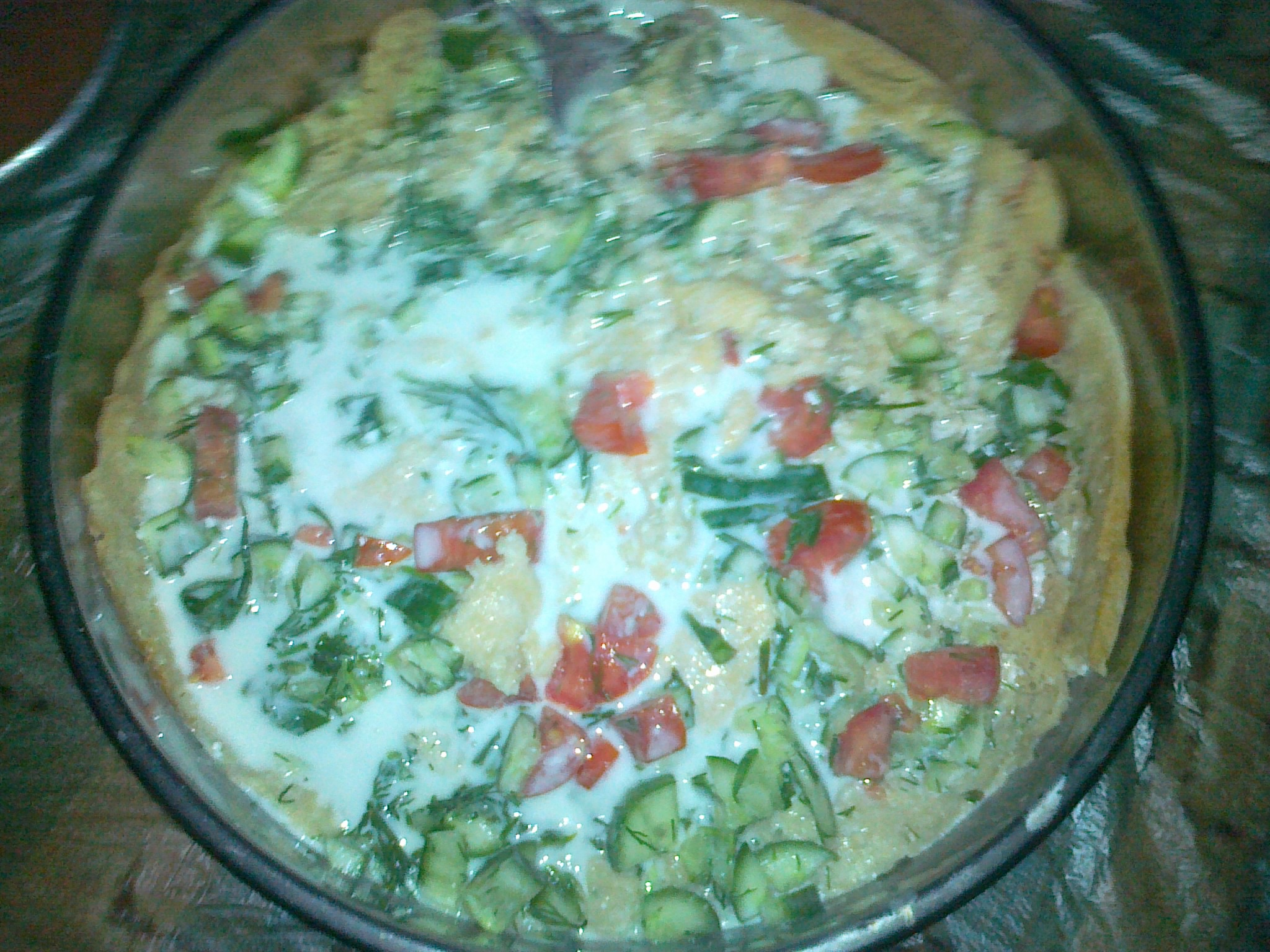
- Shafoot with vegetables
- Place of origin: Yemen
- Main ingredients: Lahooh or shredded bread, hakeen or yogurt, leek, sahawiq

Shafoot (Arabic: شفوت) also known as shafuta, is a traditional and very popular appetizer food in Yemen. It is typically made of lahoh (a sourdough flatbread) or shredded bread, haqeen (traditional buttermilk) and yogurt, sahawiq and leek. Shafoot is served cold as it is kept in the refrigerator after mixing its ingredients for some time so that the lahoh absorbs the liquid added into it. It is widely eaten in the north part of Yemen, especially during the month of Ramadan.
