= Hawaij =

Yemeni ground spice mix

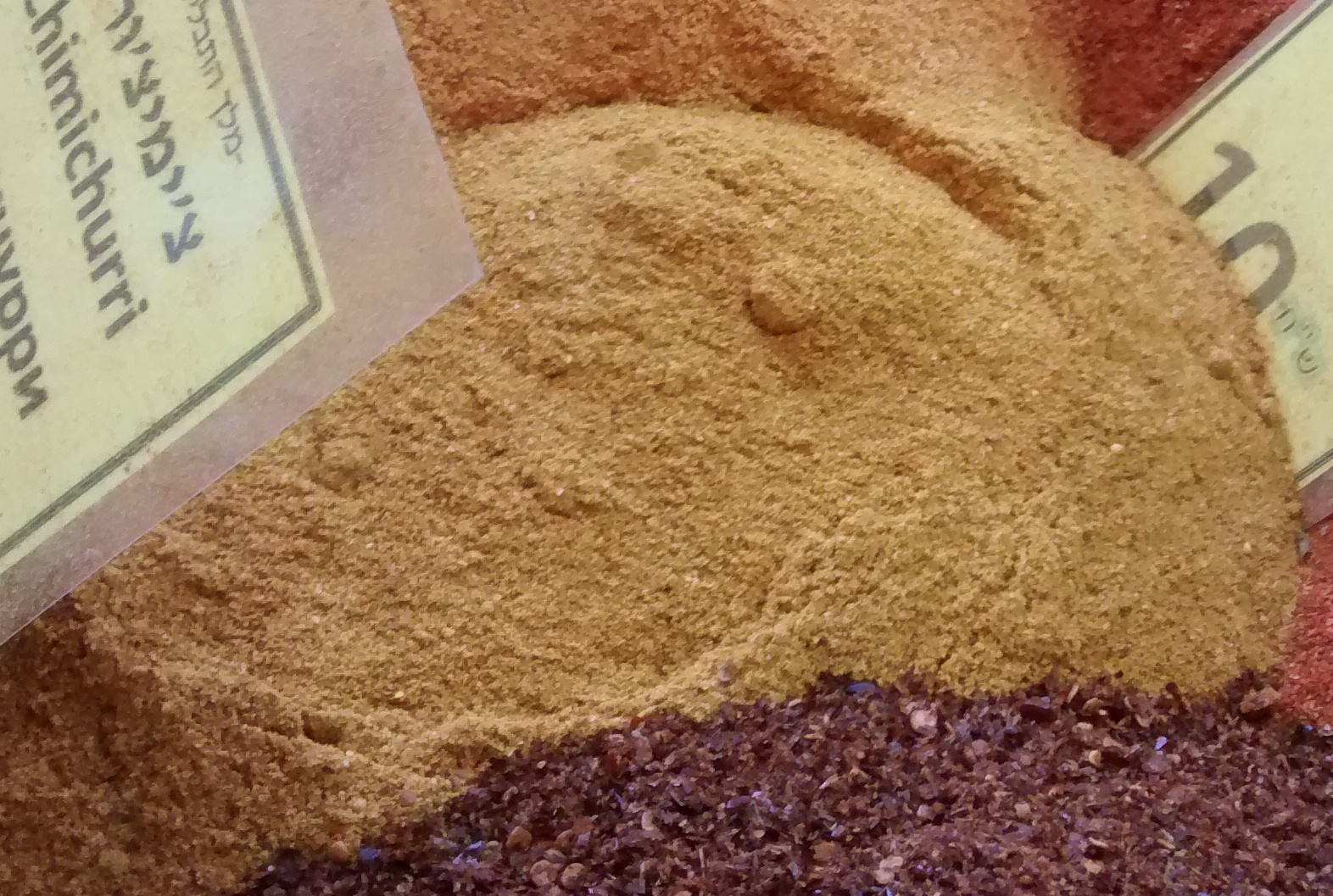
- Hawaij for sale in Tel Aviv, Israel
- Type: Spice
- Place of origin: Yemen
- Main ingredients: Cumin, black pepper, turmeric, and cardamom

Hawaij (Arabic: حوايج, lit. 'necessities' [ħa.ˈwaː.jid͡ʒ], Hebrew: חוויג'/חוואיג'), also spelled hawayej or hawayij, is a class of Yemeni ground spice mixtures used primarily for soups and Yemeni coffee.

The basic mixture for soup is also used in stews, curry-style dishes, rice and vegetable dishes, and even as a barbecue rub. It is made from cumin, black pepper, turmeric and cardamom. More elaborate versions may include ground cloves, caraway, nutmeg, saffron, coriander, fenugreek and ground dried onions. The Adeni version is made of cumin, black pepper, cardamom and coriander.

The mixture for coffee is made from aniseeds, fennel seeds, ginger and cardamom. Although it is primarily used in brewing coffee, it is also used in desserts, cakes and slow-cooked meat dishes. In Aden, the mixture is made with ginger, cardamom, cloves, and cinnamon for black coffee, and when used for tea excludes the ginger.

In Israel, hawaij is used extensively by Yemenite Jews and its use has spread more widely into Israeli cuisine as a result.

== See also ==
- List of herbs and spices
- Seasoning
