= Haneeth =

Lamb dish from Yemen

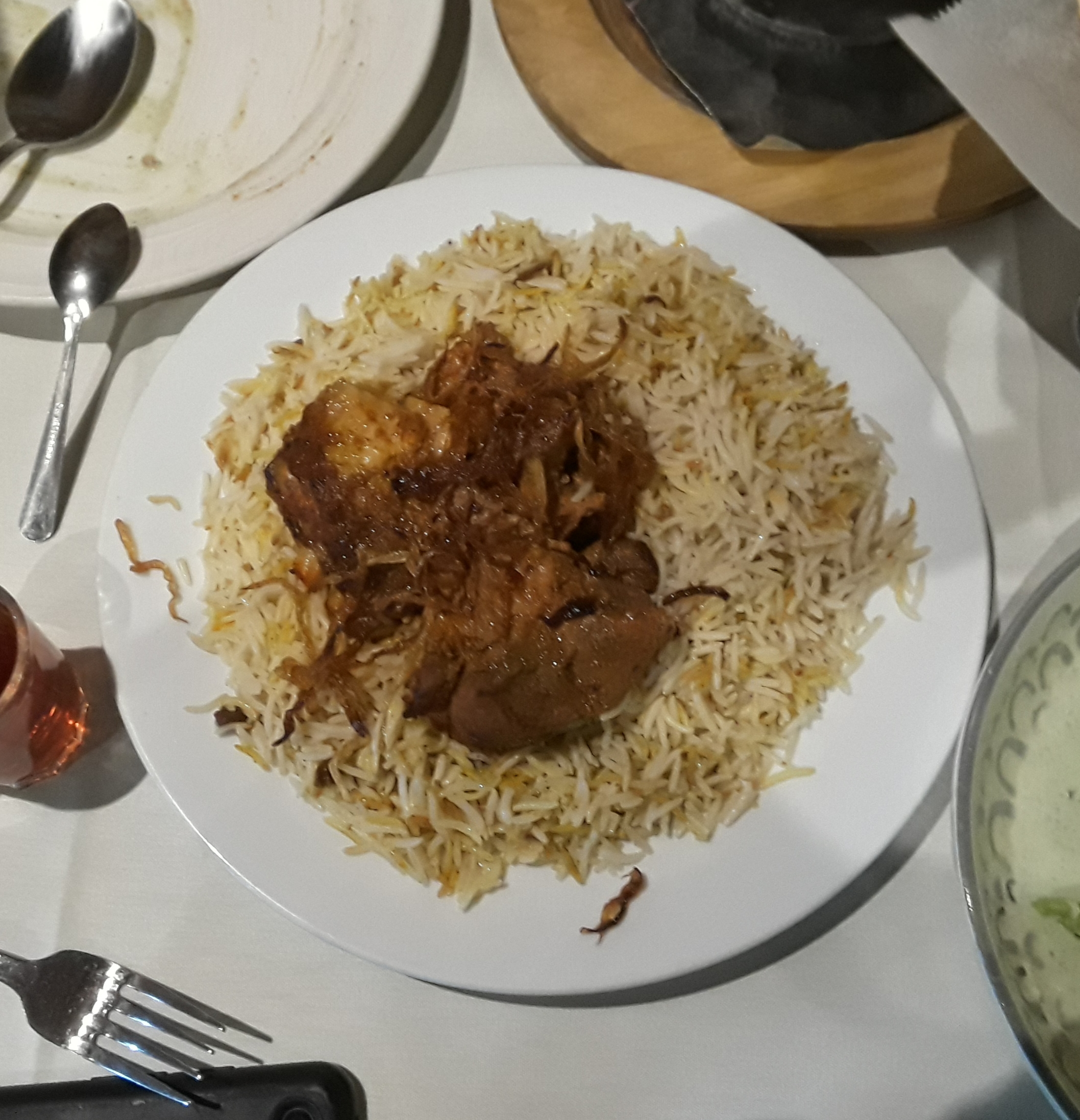
- Alternative names: Haneeth
- Course: Lunch, dinner
- Place of origin: Yemen
- Region or state: Yemen
- Main ingredients: Lamb

Haneeth is a slow-roasted lamb dish from Yemen. It is a very popular dish throughout the Arabian Peninsula. It is cooked in a tannour oven and has a different spice rub. Haneeth is usually served on a plate of rice.

== Preparation ==
Haneed is prepared by bone-in lamb covered with leptadenia. The hole to put in the meat has to be lit on fire. The preferred kind of wood is the local racosperma dried wood. The meat is then cooked in the hole for 3.5 hours on a very low temperature. This ensures that the meat is succulent and tender.
