= Somali cuisine =

Culinary traditions of Somalia

Traditional area inhabited by Somalis

Somali cuisine (Somali: Cunto Soomaali) is characterized by a history of maritime trade networks, nomadic culture, and a colonial influence. The use of spices reflect these elements and play a role in Somali cuisine. Pork consumption is forbidden in Somalia in accordance with sharia, as the vast majority of the population are Muslims. Meats such as beef, goat, lamb, camel, and fish, are always prepared halal.

== History ==
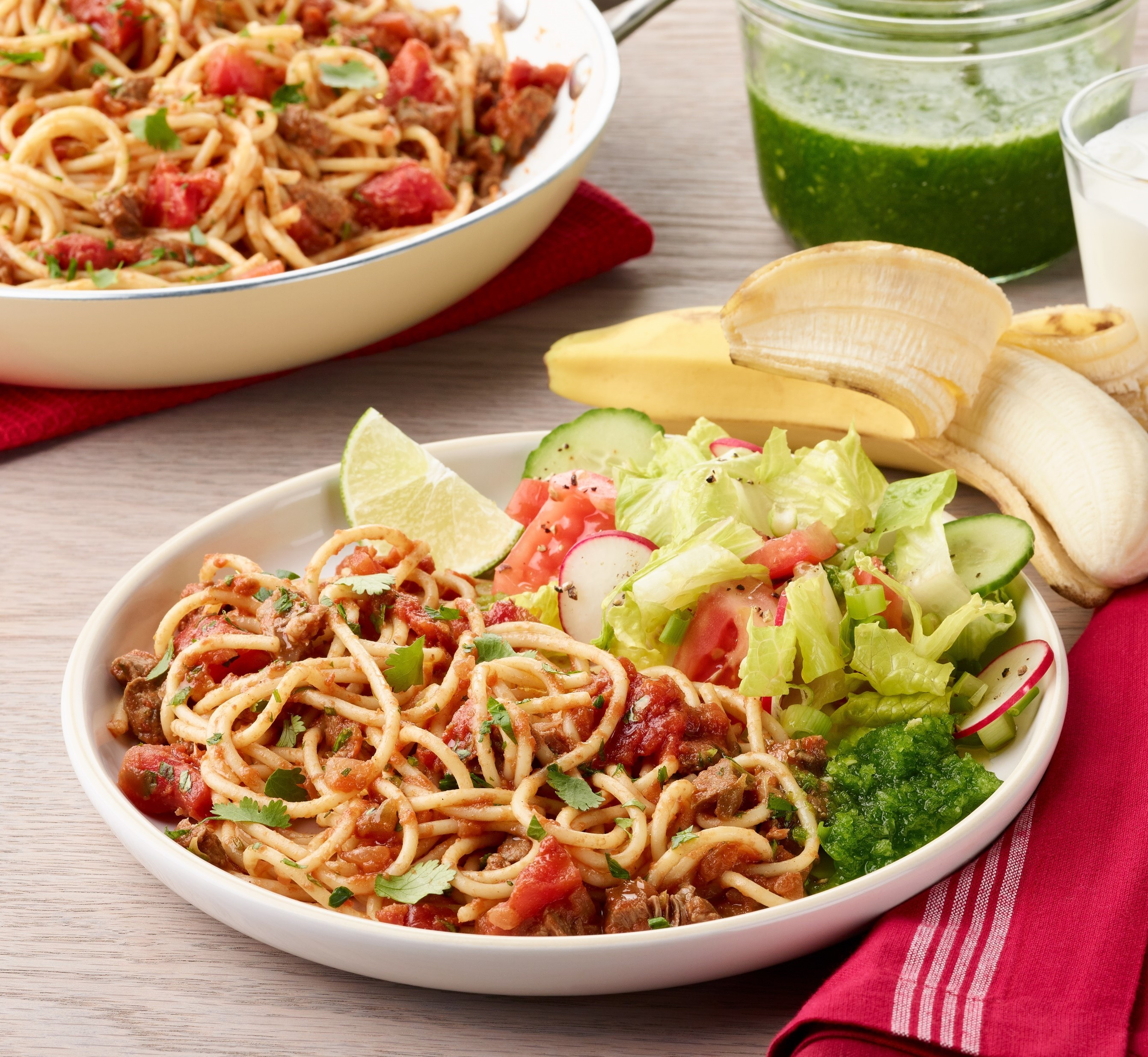
Baasto (Pasta), popular in the Northwest and Southern regions of Somalia, introduced during the Italian colonial period.

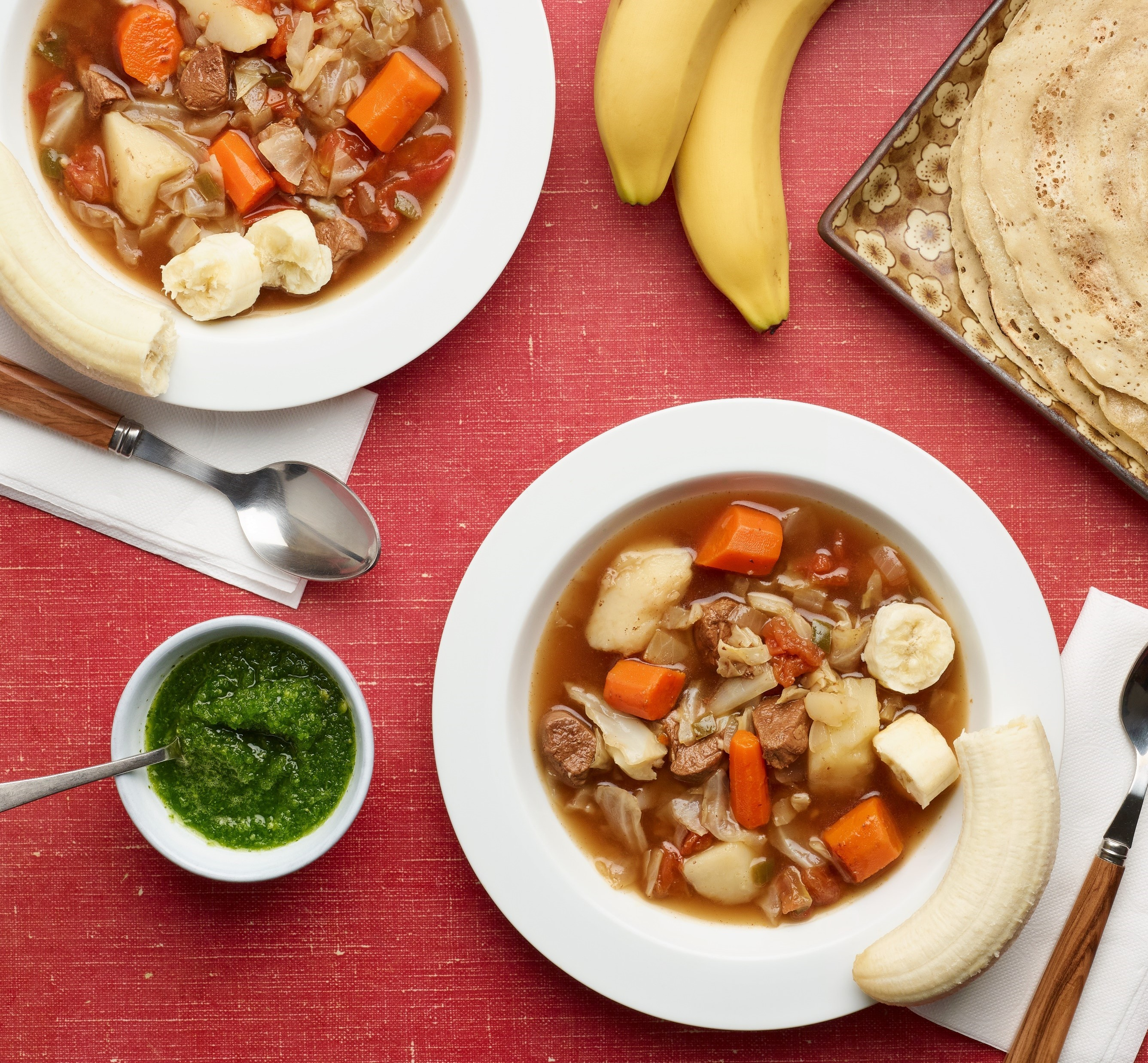
A bowl of Fah-fah, a traditional meat and vegetable soup popular in Northern Somalia and Djibouti.

The diet of Somalis typically differs between rural and urbanized populations. Meals in urban areas tend to use more fruits and vegetables compared to the simpler rural diet. In the riverine regions, corn and sorghum are staple foods. Camel milk and meat is considered a traditional meal for pastoralists. The most consumed meat is mutton, with the consumption of fish historically being limited to coastal communities. Somali culinary traditions have gained increasing international recognition, with Somali-American chefs such as Ifrah Ahmed and Hawa Hassan drawing significant attention, Abdirahman Kahin (a Somali restaurantaur) earning a Best Small Business Person in the United States, and London establishments like Al Kahf and Sabiib emerging as popular destinations among food enthusiasts.

== Breakfast ==
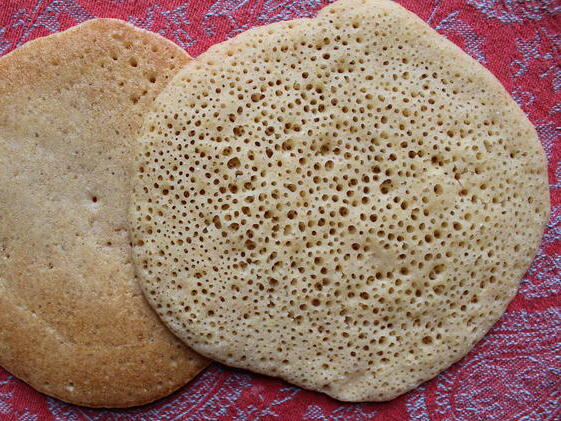
Laxoox, alternatively Canjeero in southern regions of Somalia

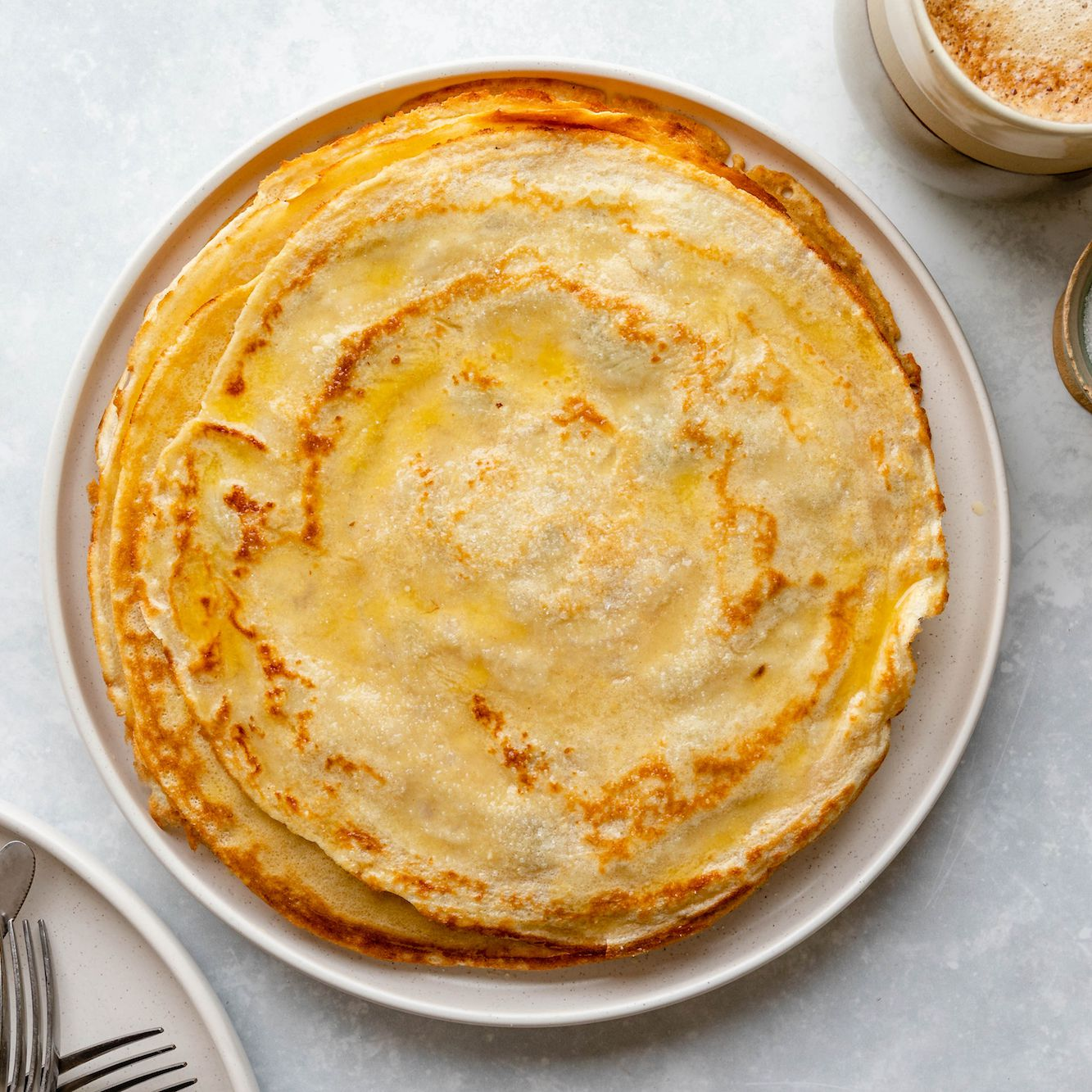
Malawax

Breakfast (quraac) is an important meal for Somalis, who often start the day with Somali-style tea (shaah/shaax) or coffee (qahwa). The tea, brewed from black tea leaves, can be served regularly as-is (shaah rinji or shaah bigays). It can be also flavoured with spices such as ginger, cardamom and cinnamon (though black pepper is not used, unlike other spiced teas). Milk is added after the brewing instead of during it; this is known as shaah cadeeys.

The main dish is typically a pancake-like bread called a canjeero or laxoox. It is often eaten along with honey and ghee, olive oil, or sesame oil, and washed down with a cup of tea. It may also be broken into small pieces with Somali ghee (subag) and sugar. For children, it is mixed with tea and sesame oil or olive oil (macsaro) until mushy. Typically, there is a side dish of liver (usually beef), goat meat (hilib ari), diced beef and sometimes kidneys (kiliyo) cooked in a bed of soup (suqaar), or oodkac / muqmad, which consists of small dried pieces of beef, goat or camel meat, boiled in ghee. Different from Ethiopian injera, Somali canjeero is smaller, thinner and sweeter. It might also be eaten with a stew (maraq) or soup.

- Sabaayad or kimis / ceesh, is another type of flatbread. During lunch, kimis / sabaayad is sometimes consumed with a Somali curry, soup, or stew.
- Muufo is another type of Somali flatbread — characterised by its puffy and uniquely thick texture — popular within south Somalia and is usually eaten with stews and soup. It is also sometimes eaten at breakfast with honey or sugar, subag, and black tea.
- Mushaari or boorash (porridge), with butter, nuts and sugar, is eaten across Somalia.
- Ful is a breakfast dish made from slow-cooked fava beans sautéed with aromatics like onions, garlic, and tomatoes, then seasoned with earthy cumin.
- Nationally, a sweet, slightly greasy crepe-like flatbread known as malawax or malawah, is a staple of most home-cooked meals and is usually eaten for breakfast with tea, in a similar manner to canjeero.

== Lunch ==
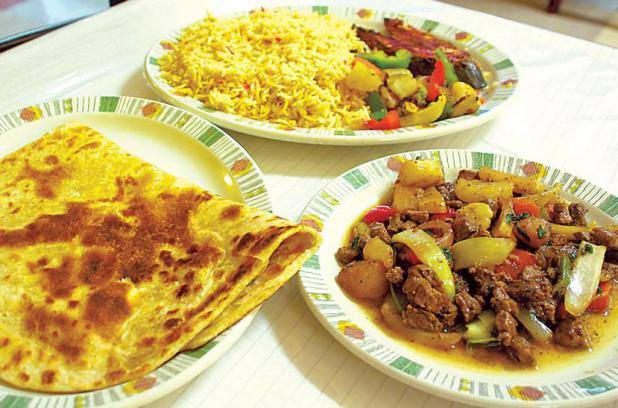
Rice (bariis) and fish (kaluun), liver (beer) with vegetables and sabayaad

Lunch (qado) is often an elaborate main dish of laxoox, pasta (baasto) or rice (Bariis iskukaris) spiced with cumin (kamuun), cardamom (heyl), cloves (dhagayare), and sage (Salvia somalensis). The use of pasta (baasto), such as spaghetti, comes from the Italians, though it is frequently accompanied by a heavier stew than pasta sauce. As with the rice, it is often served with a banana.

Spaghetti can also be served with rice, forming a novelty dish referred to as "federation". The dish is usually served with equal (whole) portions of rice and spaghetti, split on either side of a large oval plate. It is then layered with assorted stewed meats and vegetables, served with salad and an optional banana. It has been suggested that the name of the dish is derived from the union of two dishes in Somalia and also from the size and quantity of the food. It is more common to order the dish from traditional Somali restaurants, where both rice and spaghetti are always readily available; it is rare in Somali households to prepare both rice and pasta for the same meal.

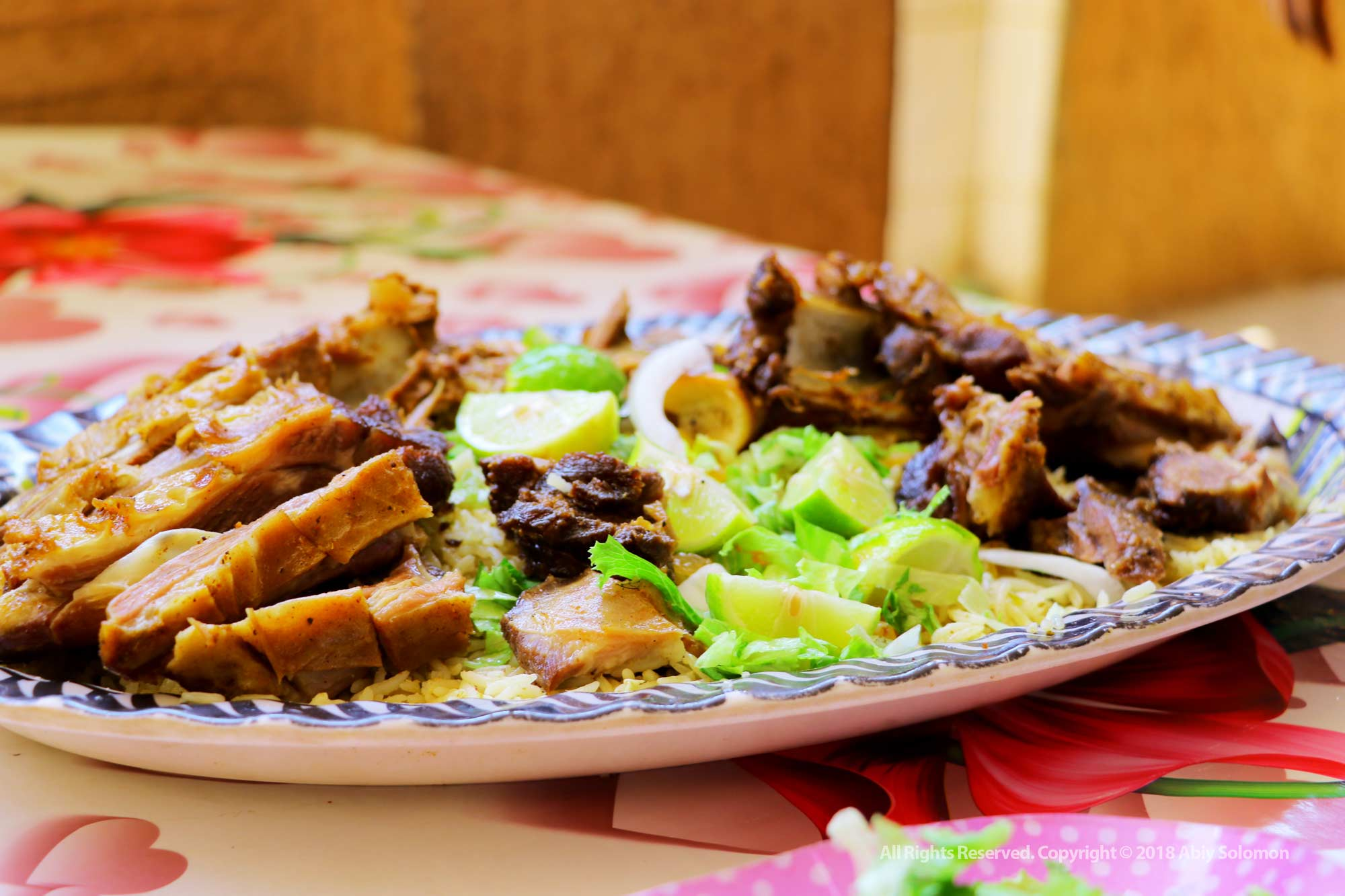
Somali dish of rice, vegetables, and hilib (meat)

Another popular dish is iskukaris, a hot pot (maraq) of rice, vegetables and meat, a national staple. Beyond the many styles of hot pot, rice is usually served with a banana on the side. In Mogadishu, steak (busteeki) and fish (kalluun/mallaay) are widely eaten.

Southern Somalis commonly consume a stiff meal made from grains such as finger millet, sorghum, pearl millet or maize referred to as "soor", or "badar"which is usually eaten alongside stews or soup or milk.

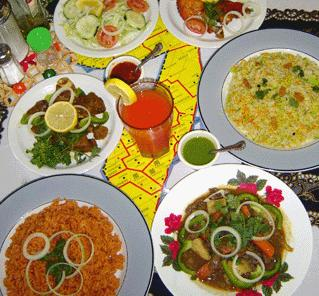
Variety of Somali food

Another commonly eaten cornmeal is eaten called asida. It is mashed with fresh milk, butter and sugar, or presented with a hole in the middle filled with maraq, or olive oil.

A variation of flat bread is sabaayad/kimis/cesh. Like the rice, is served with maraq and meat on the side. The sabaayad of Somalia is often somewhat sweet, and is cooked in a little oil.

Popular drinks at lunch are balbeelmo (grapefruit), raqey (tamarind) and isbarmuunto (lemonade). In Mogadishu, fiimto (Vimto) and laas (lassi) are also common. In the northwest, the preferred drinks are cambe (mango), guava, and tufaax (apple).

== Dinner ==
Digir guduud
(Adzuki bean)

Galley cambuulo (White hominy corn grits)

Dinner (casho) in Somalia is served as late as 9 pm. During Ramadan, dinnertime often follows Tarawih prayers, sometimes as late as 11 pm. Cambuulo, a common dinner dish, is made from well-cooked cowpea beans and sorghum mixed with butter and sugar. The beans, which on their own are referred to as digir, can take up to 2 hours to finish cooking when left on the stove at a low temperature. Sorghum or maize or rice or wheat is also used; cracked or uncracked, it is cooked and served just like the hominy grits or azuki beans.

Rooti iyo xalwo, slices of bread served with a gelatinous confection, is another dinner dish. Muufo, a variation of cornbread, is a dish made of maize and is baked in a tinaar (clay oven). It is eaten by cutting it into small pieces, topped with sesame oil (macsaro) and sugar, then mashed together with black tea.

Before sleeping, a glass of milk spiced with cardamom is often consumed.

== Snacks ==
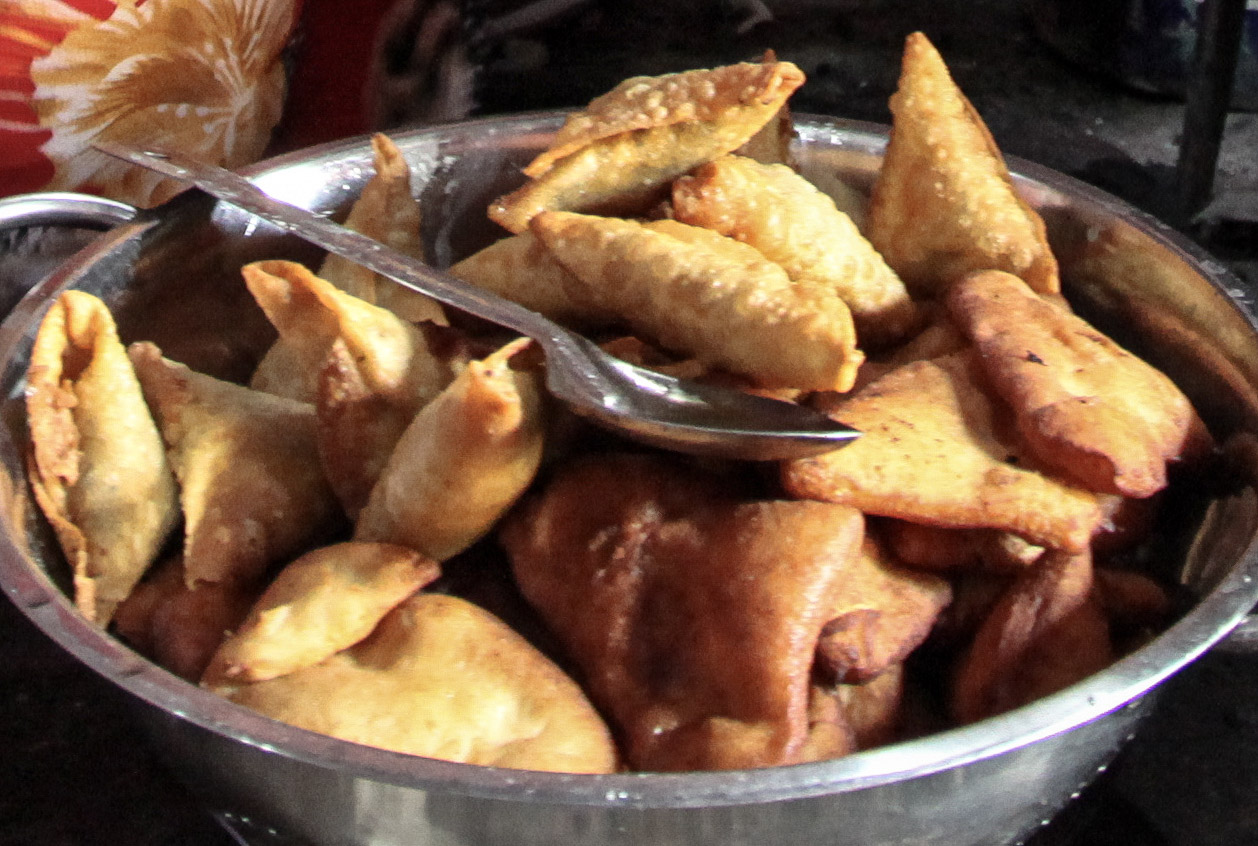
Sambuus and Bur (right)

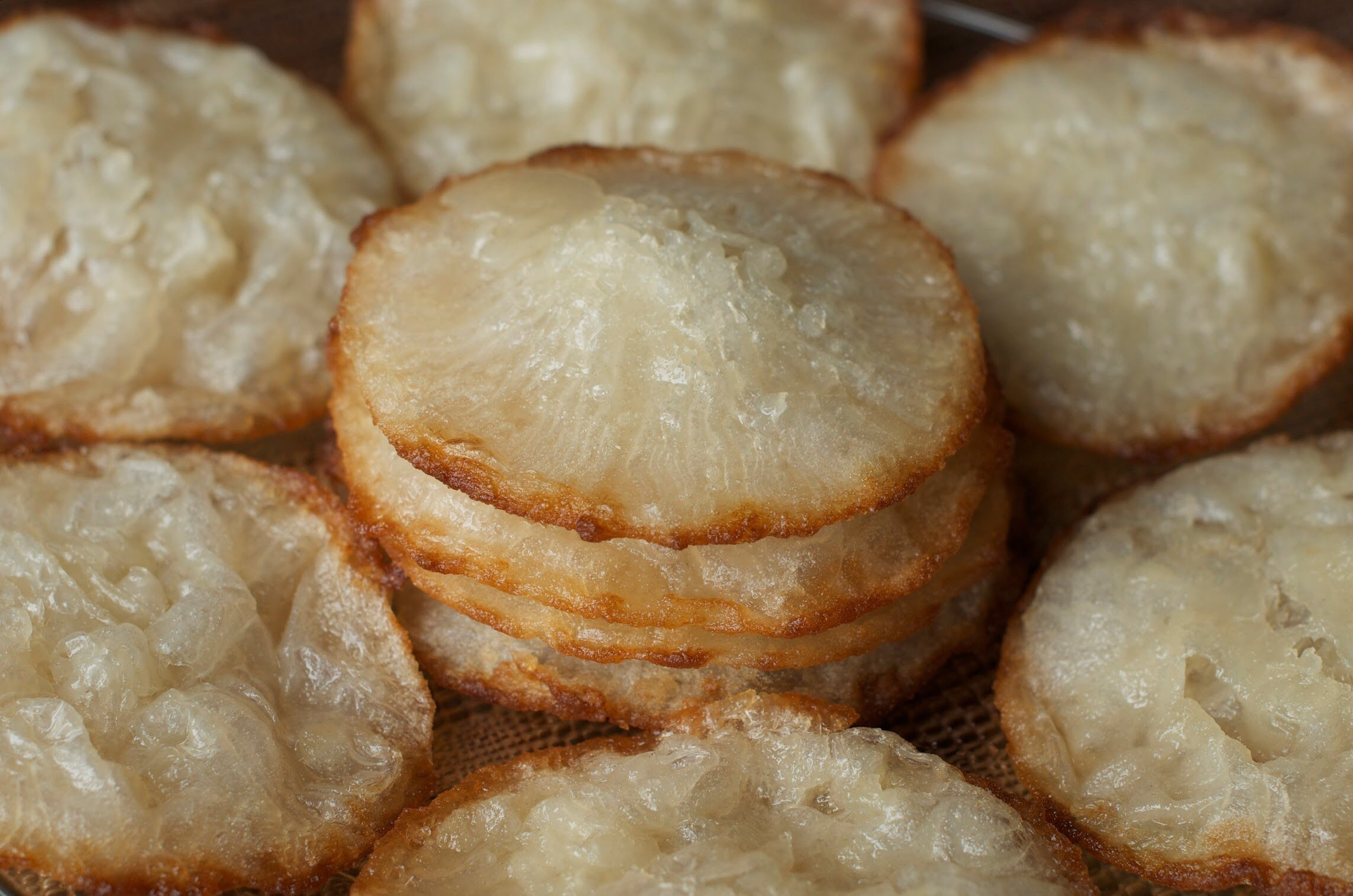
Mashmash

Sambuus, a Somali variation of the Desi samosa, is a triangular snack that is commonly eaten throughout Somalia during the afur (iftar) and is frequently served alongside bur (literally translating to "flour" or "dough"). Kebab is a snack eaten in western Somalia. There are several varieties of this dish. For instance, it may be served on sticks or skewers with vegetables. Another common variety, consisting of minced meat mixed with egg and flour and then fried, is popular in south Somalia. It resembles kofta kebab. Other snacks include chicken and vegetable filled rolls and bajiyo, which is made from black-eyed peas or adzuki beans and usually served with spicy sauce. These, along with sambusas, are very popular not only during Ramadan, but also for special occasions such as weddings and family gatherings. Homemade chips are made with fresh potato and black pepper. Fruits such as mango (cambo), guava (seytuun), banana (moos), and orange (liinbanbeelmo) are eaten throughout the day.

== Sweets ==
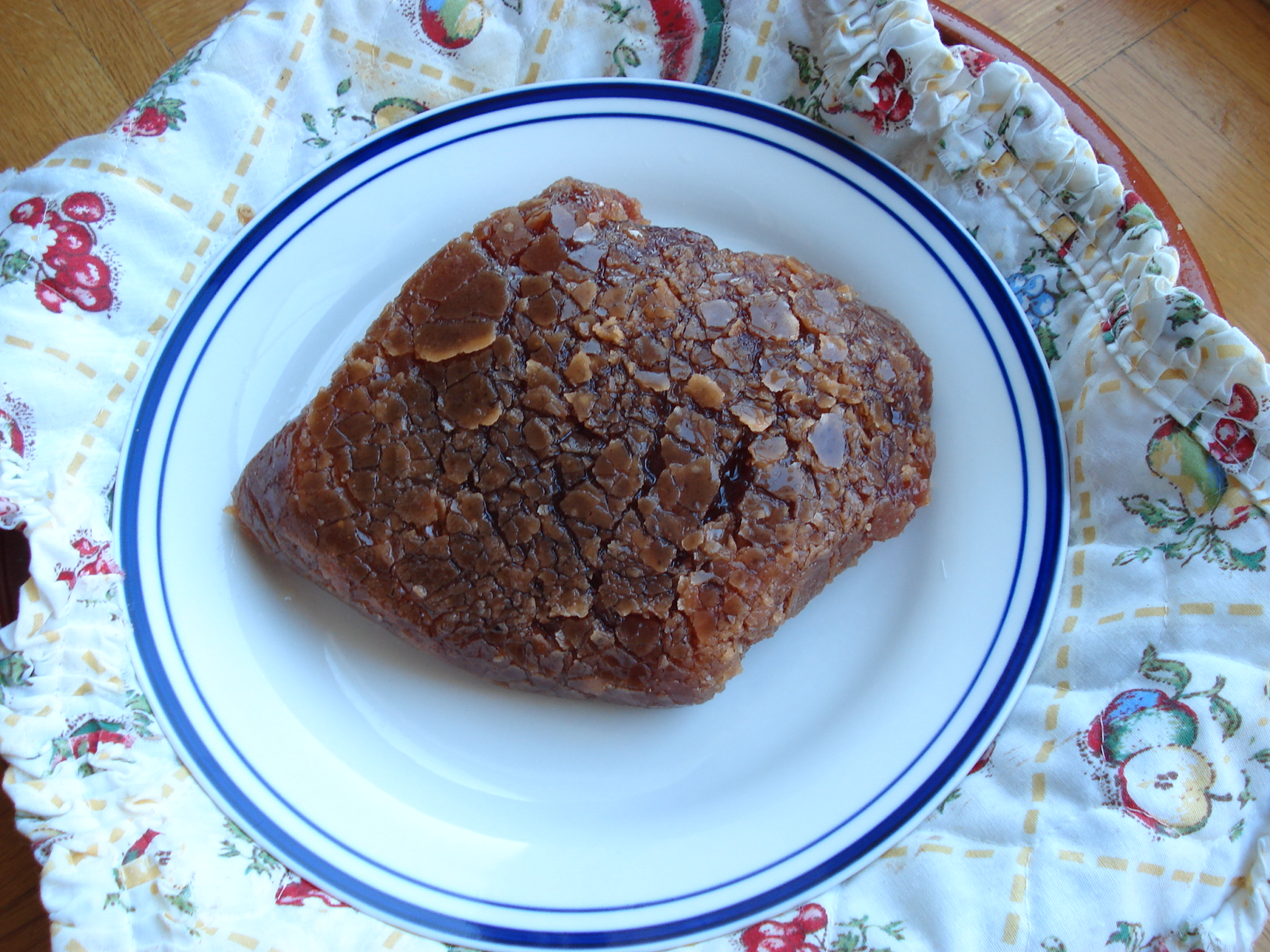
Xalwo (halwo) or halva is a staple of Somali cuisine.

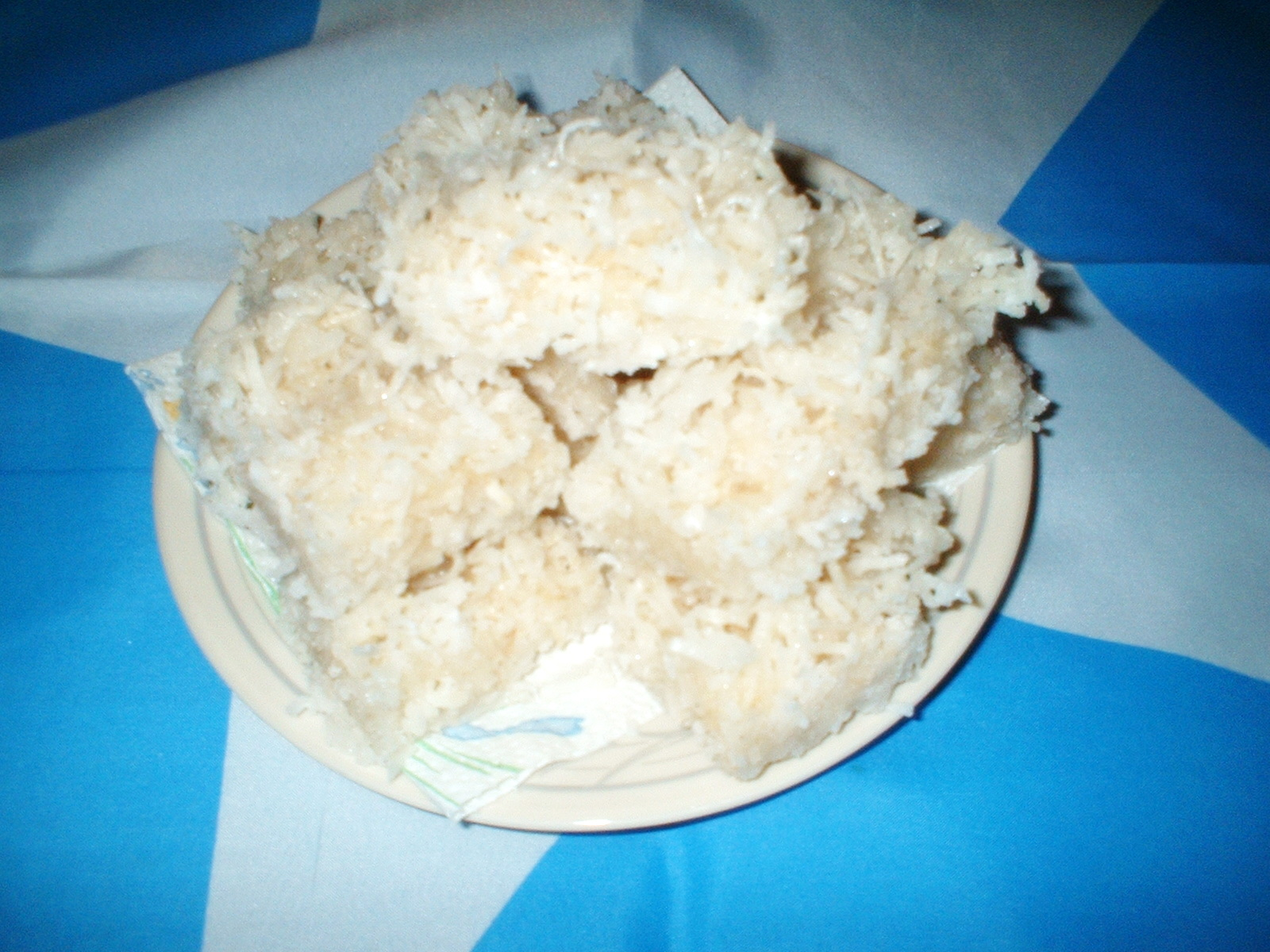
Gashaato, a coconut-based confection

- Xalwo or halwo (comparable to grain-based variants of halva) is a popular Benadiri snack confection served during special occasions, such as Eid celebrations or wedding receptions. Xalwo is made from sugar, cornstarch, cardamom powder, nutmeg powder, and ghee. Peanuts are also sometimes added to enhance texture and flavor.
- In the south, there is a rice pudding called ruz bil laban.
- Gashaato, kashaato or qumbe, made from coconut, sugar and oil, which is spiced with cardamom, is a much-loved sweet from Benadir. The sugar is brought to a boil with a bit of water, then the cardamom is added followed by shredded coconut.
- Lows iyo sisin is a favorite sweet in the south. It consists of a mixture of peanuts (lows) and sesame seeds (sisin) in a bed of caramel. The confection sticks together to form a bar.
- Jallaato, similar to the American ice pop, is made by freezing naturally sweet fruits with a stick in the middle. More recently in Mogadishu (Xamar), it has grown to include caano jallaato, which is made with milk and requires sugaring up. The word jallaato comes from gelato, which is Italian for "frozen".
- Buskut or buskud is also from the south comprises many types of cookies, including very soft ones called daardaar (literally "touch-touch" due to its smooth, delicate texture).
- Doolshe encompasses many styles of cakes.
- Icun is a sweet mostly eaten by southern Somalis. It is made from sugar and flour mixed with oil and is most frequently served at weddings and for Eid.
- Shushumow is a fried Somali pastry with a crystallised shell which is usually made as a party snack.
- Basbousa is a traditional Somali sweet cake of Arab influence. It is made from cooked semolina or farina soaked in simple syrup.
- Also in the north there is lokma, a sweet fried-dough pastry.
- Baklava is also eaten by some Somalis.

There are many sweets eaten during festive occasions, such as weddings, parties or Eid. Among these are baalbaaloow, shuushuumoow, bur hindi, bur tuug, and qumbe (coconut), the last of which is made from coconuts mixed with sugar to form a bar.

== After-meal ==
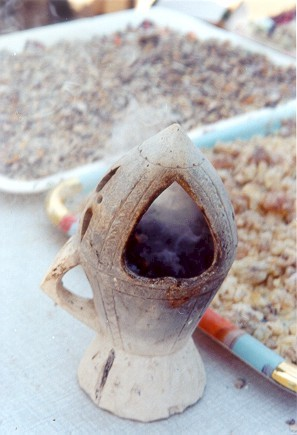
A dabqaad incense burner

Somalis traditionally perfume their homes after meals. Frankincense (luubaan) or a prepared incense (uunsi) is placed on top of hot charcoal inside an incense burner or censer (a dabqaad) or idin. It then burns for about ten minutes. This keeps the house fragrant for hours. The burner is made from soapstone found in specific areas of Somalia.

== See also ==
- Suqaar
- Safari, the only Somali restaurant in New York City
- Cuisine of the Horn of Africa
- Arab cuisine
- List of African cuisines
