= Bariis =

Bariis may refer to:

- The Somali name for Rice
- Bariis iskukaris, a popular rice dish in Somali cuisine
