= Djiboutian cuisine =

Culinary tradition of Djibouti

Djiboutian cuisine is a mixture of Somali, Afar, Yemeni, and French cuisine, with some additional South Asian (especially Indian) culinary influences.

Local dishes are commonly prepared using a variety of Middle Eastern spices, ranging from saffron to cinnamon. Grilled Yemeni fish, opened in half and often cooked in tandoori-style ovens, are a local delicacy. Spicy dishes come in many variations, from the traditional fah-fah or soupe djiboutienne (spicy boiled beef soup), to the yetakelt wet (spicy mixed vegetable stew).

Xalwo (pronounced "halwo") or halva is a popular confection eaten during festive occasions,such as Eid celebrations or wedding receptions. Halva is made from sugar, corn starch, cardamom powder, nutmeg powder and ghee. Peanuts are sometimes added to enhance texture and flavor.

== Breakfast ==
Breakfast (quraac) is an important meal for people in Djibouti, who often start the day with some style of tea (shaah) or coffee (buna). The main dish is typically a pancake-like bread called lahoh, which might also be eaten with a stew or soup, such as wat. It is similar to the Ethiopian injera, but smaller and thinner. A side dish of liver (usually beef), goat meat (hilib ari), diced beef cooked in a bed of soup (suqaar), or jerky (oodkac or muqmad), may also be served. Three pieces of lahoh are often eaten along with honey, ghee, and a cup of tea.

== Lunch and dinner ==
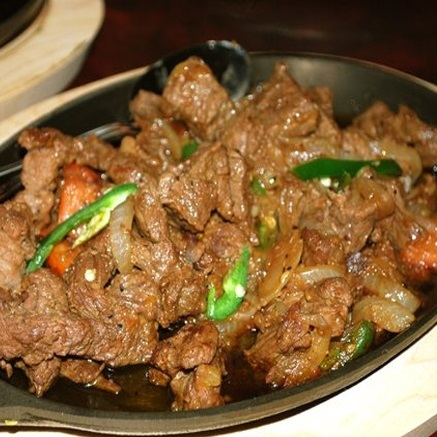
Dromedary tibs served at a restaurant in Djibouti.

Lunch (qado) and dinner (casho) are often served with an elaborate main dish of stew (maraq), which comes in a variety of styles and flavors. Rice (bariis) is often served with meat and/or a banana on the side. In Djibouti City, steak and fish are widely consumed. Pasta (baasto) is frequently presented with a heavier stew than the Italian pasta sauce, but is otherwise served in a similar manner as the rice. Grilled meats are frequently eaten with the pasta.

Djiboutian cuisine is commonly prepared using many Middle Eastern spices, ranging from saffron to cinnamon. Spicy dishes come in many variations, from the traditional fah-fah or soupe Djiboutienne (spicy boiled beef soup), to the yetakelt wet (spicy mixed vegetable stew). Popular side dishes are lentils and rice, which are typically covered with sauces, such as the hot berbere or the buttery niter kibbeh.

== Snacks and sweets ==
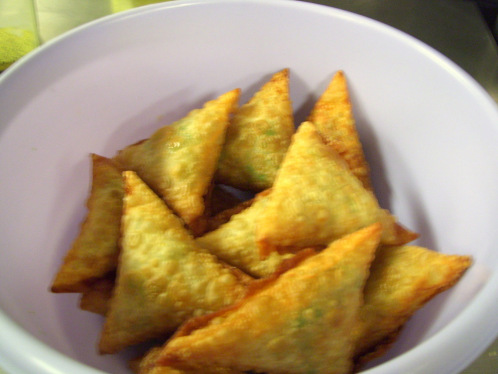
A plate of sambus (samosas)

Sambusa, the Somali version of the triangular samosa snack, is commonly eaten throughout Djibouti during the afur (iftar). The local variant is spiced with hot green chili pepper, and the main ingredient is often ground meat (usually goat) or fish. Xalwo (pronounced "halwo") or halva is a popular confection served during special occasions, such as Eid celebrations or wedding receptions.

Garoobey is one of the staple dishes of Djibouti. It is a porridge prepared by soaking oats in milk, and is flavored with cumin or other spices. Bajiyos, the Somali version of the Indian pakora, are a regular fixture at the table and in street shops, particularly when it is time to break the fast during Ramadan. They are part of the four essential elements of the Djiboutian afternoon tea. Fruits such as mango (cambo), guava (seytuun), and banana (moos) are also eaten throughout the day as snacks.
