= Culture of Djibouti =

The culture of the Republic of Djibouti is diverse due to the nation's Red Sea location at a crossroads of trade and commerce.

Djiboutian population is divided into several human components: the Issa and the Anfar, the Muslim religion for the most part, that are traditionally attached to anthropological group Hamitic. They were called "Hamites Orientals" to distinguish them from these other Hamites that are Egyptians and Berbers. An important Arab community of Yemeni origin, is also based in Djibouti.

The Afars and the Issa Somalis who are characterized by slender physique, regular features, and proud bearing, they speak different Cushitic languages from the great Afroasiatic language family, and traditionally lived as nomadic pastoralists. However, the population tends to settle because today more than half of its citizens live in the capital and the towns and villages of the interior. This land, traditional crossing point between Egypt, Sudan and Saudi crossroads of nations between Africa and Asia, has likely undergone mixing of populations who have played an important role in the fate of the original peoples of the Djibouti nation. Poetry traditionally recited in the villages by special readers called gabaye was a way of recording the community's history and customs, as well as current events.

== Ethnic groups ==
An Issa woman in nomadic attire.

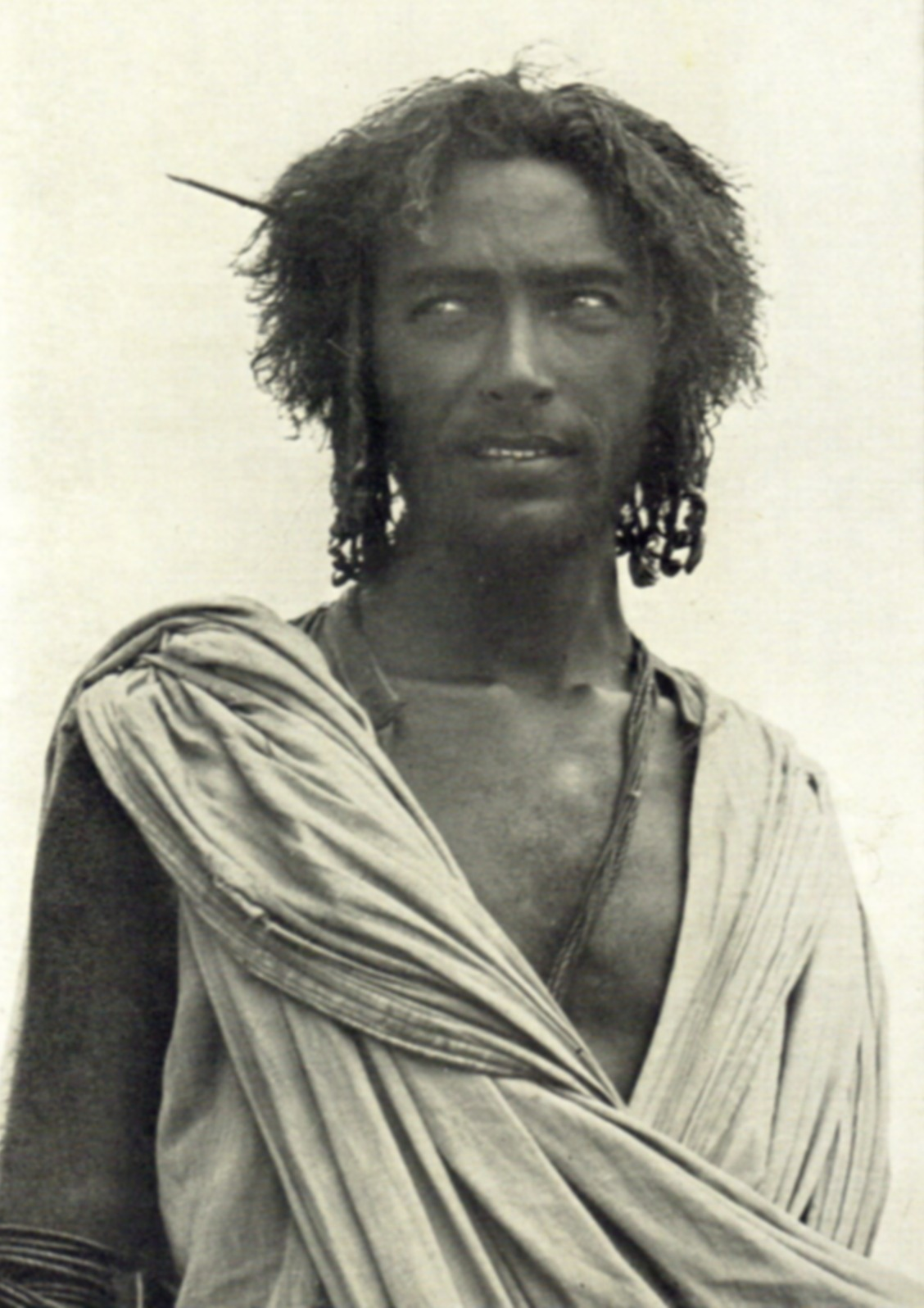
An Afar man in nomadic attire.

Djibouti is a multiethnic country. The two largest ethnic groups are the Dir (clan) Somali (60%) and the Afar (35%). The Somali clan component is mainly composed of the Issas, followed by a sizable group of Gadabuursi and smaller numbers of Isaaq. Both are sub-clans of the larger Dir; the Issas form part of the Madoobe Dir, while the Gadabuursi are part of the Madaluug Dir. The remaining 5% of Djibouti's population primarily consists of Arabs, Ethiopians and Europeans (French and Italians). Most local residents are urban dwellers; the remainder are pastoralists.

=== Arabs ===
Djiboutians have had expansive relations with the Arab world, as is manifested in its adoption of Arabic as an official language, its location within the Arabian Plate, its membership with the Arab League, its millennia-old trade relations with the peninsula's Arabs, and more recently, initiatives for a transcontinental crossing that would permanently link Djiboutians to the Arabian Peninsula. Djibouti has also hosted Arab refugees, primarily from Yemen.

=== Somali ===
Somalis have traditionally been organized into nomadic pastoral clans, loose empires, sultanates and city-states.

Their clan groupings are important social units, wherein membership plays a central part in Somali culture. Clans are patrilineal and are often divided into sub-clans, sometimes with many sub-divisions. Somali society is traditionally ethnically endogamous. So as to extend ties of alliance, marriage is often to another ethnic Somali from a different clan.

== The six sons of Isse Madoobe Dir ==
According to Ibrahim Axmad Cali in his 2016 book, “Ayaa-Reeb: Kab dhexeeye Sooyalka Xeer Cisse; Jabuuti, Naadiga iyo Qaalinleyda iyo Hal'abuurka Soomaliyeed, 2016» Cisse Madobe Dir had six sons from his four wives. His first wife, Xawa Aw Muuse of the Madigan tribe, was the mother of Eleye (Ceeleeye), Walaldon and Holleh. His second wife, from the Sheekhal tribe, was the mother of Wardiiq; his third wife, Rooney of the Akishe tribe, was Horoneh's mother; and his last wife, Reer Wakhroon of the Sharifaan tribe, was the mother of Maagtire Geele, also known as Urweyne, and Wakhroon Sama arag. According to him, the six sons of Cisse Madobe Dir are blood brothers, and there are not two categories within the Cisse clan. He also refutes in his work the notion of "So-raac", the meaning of which has been distorted. Originally, this expression referred solely to the leadership role due to the primogeniture of the children of Sheikh Cisse's first wife, who often imposed their decisions on the three other brothers, hence the expression "Na so raaca" (pronounced Follow us). Later, during the establishment of the Xeer Cisse around 1550 in the Sitti Mountains, the elders of Cisse created alliances within six Cisse sub-clans, dividing them into three groups: the first group, called Abgaal, is composed of the Eleyeh (Celeeye) sub-clan and the Urweyne or Maagtire Geele sub-clan; the second group, called Dalool, is composed of the Walaldon, Holleh and Horoneh; and finally, the third group, which forms an intermediary between the other two, contains only the Wardiq sub-clan, which is also that of the Ougass of the Cisse.

=== Afar ===
Afar society has historically been organized into independent kingdoms, each ruled by its own Sultan. A portion of the community also consists of pastoralists, raising goats, sheep, and cattle in the desert.

Socially, they are organized into clan families and two main classes: the asaimara ('reds') who are the dominant class politically, and the adoimara ('whites') who are a working class and are found in the Mabla Mountains.

In addition, the Afar are reputed for their martial prowess. Men traditionally sport the jile, a famous curved knife. They also have an extensive repertoire of battle songs.

== Languages ==
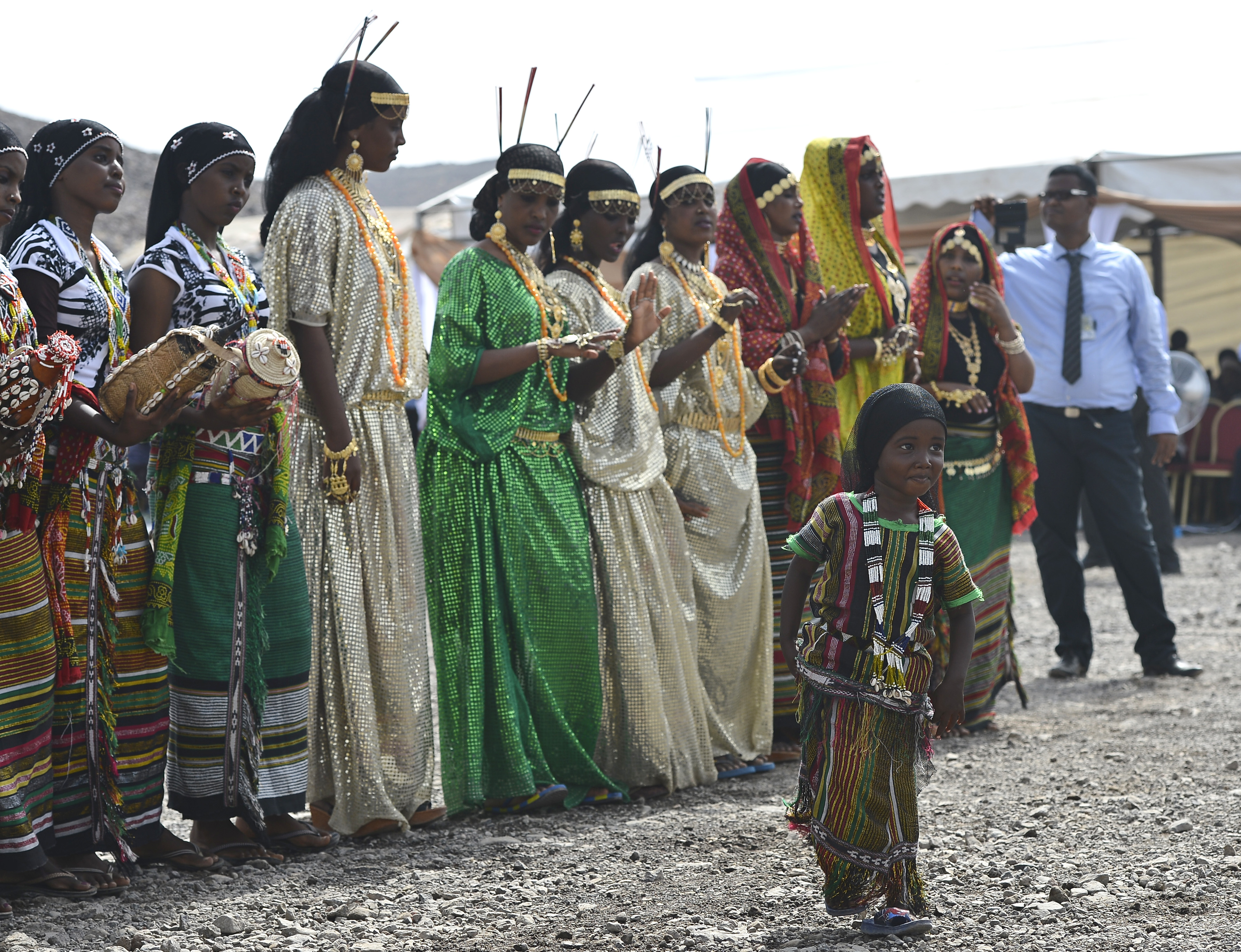
Djiboutian women dressed in traditional Afar and Issa tribal attire

Djibouti is a multilingual nation. According to Ethnologue, the majority of the population speaks Somali (524,000 speakers) or Afar (306,000 speakers) as a first language, which are the mother tongues of the Somali and Afar ethnic groups, respectively. Both languages belong to the larger Afroasiatic family. There are two official languages in Djibouti: Arabic (Afroasiatic) and French (Indo-European). Arabic is of social, cultural and religious importance. In formal settings, it consists of Modern Standard Arabic. Colloquially, about 59,000 local residents speak the Ta'izzi-Adeni Arabic dialect, also known as Djibouti Arabic. French was inherited from the colonial period and is the primary language of instruction. About 10,200 Djiboutians speak it as a first language. Immigrant languages include Omani Arabic (38,900 speakers), Amharic (1,400 speakers), and Greek (1,000 speakers).

== Religion ==
Religion in Djibouti
religion	percent
Islam	98%
Christianity	2%

With few exceptions, Somali and Afar are entirely Muslims, the majority belonging to the Sunni branch of Islam. The constitution of Djibouti likewise defines Islam as the religion of the Republic of Djibouti. Islam entered the region very early on, as a group of persecuted Muslims had, at Prophet Muhummad's urging, sought refuge across the Red Sea in the Horn of Africa. Islam may thus have been introduced to the area well before the faith even took root in its place of origin. Christianity is a minority religion in Djibouti, with around 4,767 adherents.

== Attire ==
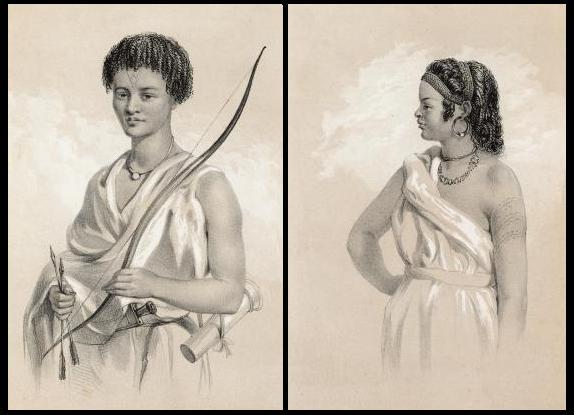
Issa Somali man and woman in traditional attire (1844)

When not dressed in western clothing such as jeans and t-shirts, men typically wear the macawiis, which is a sarong-like garment worn around the waist. Among nomads, many wear a loosely wrapped white cotton robe called a tobe that goes down to about the knee, with the end thrown over the shoulder (much like a Roman toga).

Women typically wear the dirac, which is a long, light, diaphanous voile dress made of cotton or polyester that is worn over a full-length half-slip and a bra. Married women tend to sport head-scarves referred to as shash, and also often cover their upper body with a shawl known as garbasaar. Unmarried or young women, however, do not always cover their heads. Traditional Arabian garb such as the male jellabiya (jellabiyaad in Somali) and the female jilbāb is also commonly worn. For some occasions such as festivals, women may adorn themselves with specialized jewelry and head-dresses similar to those worn by the Berber tribes of the Maghreb.

== Music ==
Djibouti's various ethnic groups each have their own different styles of music and accompanying dances. Common instruments used by many of the communities are the drum, tanbura and oud. Somali and Afar have a rich musical heritage centered on traditional Somali and Afar folklore. Most Somali songs are pentatonic; that is, they only use five pitches per octave in contrast to a heptatonic (seven note) scale such as the major scale. At first listen, Somali music might be mistaken for the sounds of nearby regions such as Ethiopia, Sudan or Arabia, but it is ultimately recognizable by its own unique tunes and styles. Somali songs are usually the product of collaboration between lyricists (midho), songwriters (lahan) and singers ('odka or "voice").

== Sport ==
Football is the most popular sport in Djibouti. The Djibouti national football team, nicknamed the Riverains de la Mer Rouge ("Shoremen of the Red Sea"), plays various international squads both locally and abroad. It is controlled by the Djiboutian Football Federation, and is a member of the Confederation of African Football (CAF) and the Union of Arab Football Associations (UAFA). There are also hundreds of football clubs that compete at the domestic level.

Basketball is the second most popular sport. At world basketball, Djibouti is represented by the Fédération Djiboutienne de Basket Ball. Unlike neighboring countries Ethiopia or Somalia, Djibouti has never appeared for the African Basketball Championship at either senior or junior level, men or women.

== See also ==
- Djiboutian cuisine
