= Maraq (dish) =

Type of broth or soup

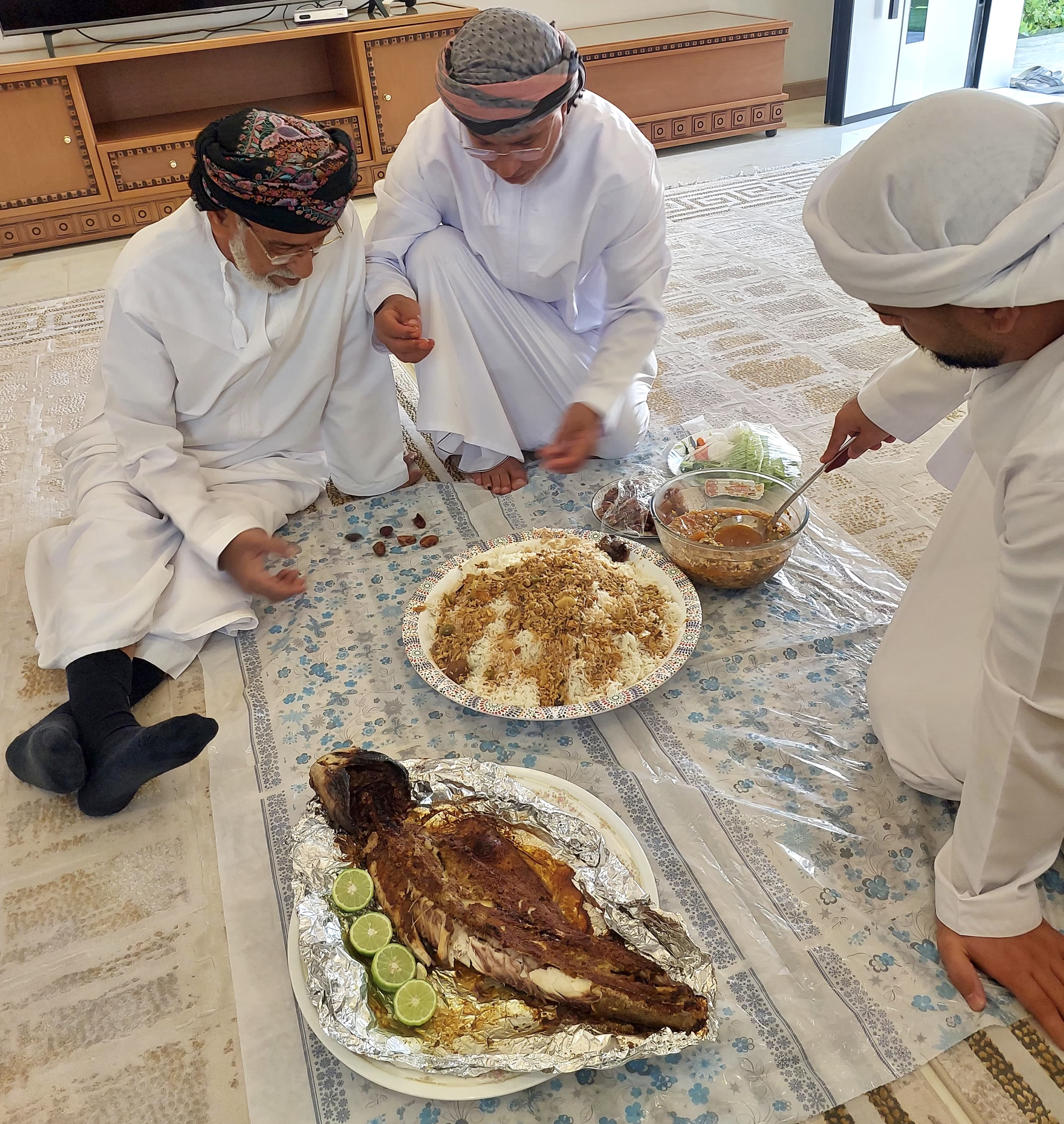
- Omani men eating rice covered in Maraq
- Alternative names: Saloona
- Type: Broth, Soup
- Course: Lunch or dinner
- Place of origin: Greater Somalia, Arabian Peninsula
- Main ingredients: Lamb, chicken, seafood, water, spices

Maraq (Arabic: مرق) is a broth or soup dish commonly eaten in the Greater Somalia region and the Arabian Peninsula. It can also be found in Indonesia.

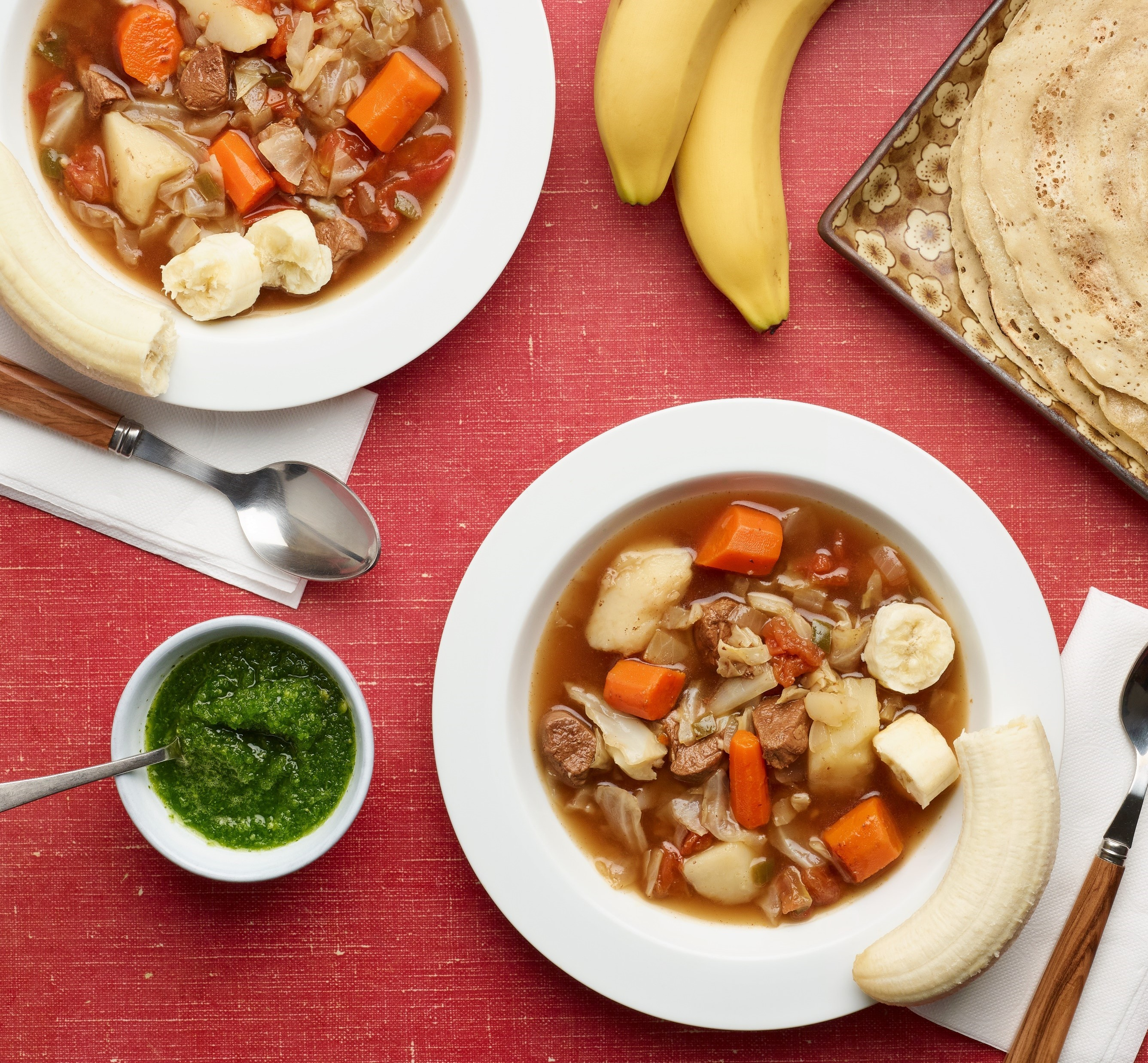
Fahfah, a Djiboutian soup dish

== Etymology ==
The word itself simply means "broth" in Arabic and Somali. It can also refer to a soup or stew in Somali.

== Preparation ==
An everyday, home cooked meal, the process of cooking maraq would usually begin by boiling some meat with some spices and the broth with sautéed onions, garlic, ginger, and vegetables. After the meat is tender and cooked, it is served on a bed of rice. The resulting maraq broth can either be poured on top of the rice or served in a bowl on the side. It is also common to squeeze fresh lime into the maraq as it cools down for additional flavor.

== Types ==
There are different types of maraq in Somali cuisine with the most popular being maraq ari (lamb soup) and maraq digaag (chicken soup), both of which can be eaten with a side of muufo (flatbread) or on its own. The broth from the maraq may also be used as a base for rice. Fahfah is a soup eaten in Djibouti and northern Somalia consisting of goat meat with vegetables and green chili. Non-meat variations of maraq include maraq qudaar (vegetable stew) and maraq misir (red lentil soup).

== See also ==
- List of chicken dishes
- List of lamb dishes
- List of seafood dishes
