= Sabaayad =

Meal in Somalia and Djibouti

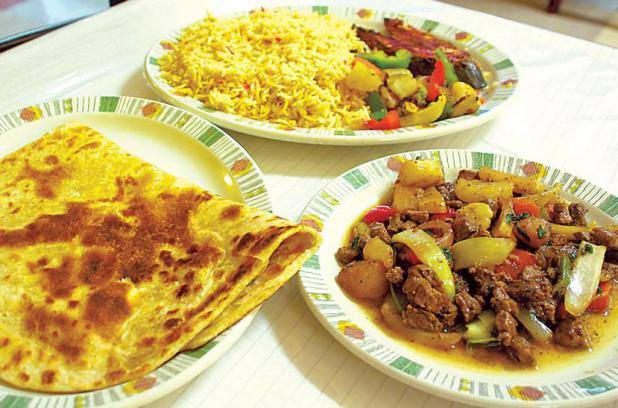
- Sabaayad on the left
- Alternative names: Kimis, Kibis
- Type: Flatbread
- Course: Breakfast or dinner
- Place of origin: Greater Somalia
- Region or state: Horn of Africa
- Main ingredients: Flour, water and salt

Sabayad, (Somali: Sabaayad) also known as Kimis, Kibis or Ceesh, is a chewy, slightly flaky type of square Somali flatbread eaten in Somalia, Kenya, Ethiopia and Djibouti.

== History ==
A very commonly served bread in Somali cuisine, Sabayad is usually eaten during breakfast or dinner. It is made from a dough of plain flour, water and salt. It is generally rolled into rough squares and briefly fried in a pan.

== Ingredients ==
- 4 cups all-purpose flour
- 1 teaspoon salt
- 3 tablespoons olive oil
- 2 tablespoons honey
- 1½ cups tepid water
- 2 tablespoons canola oil, divided (plus extra as needed for cooking)

== Procedure ==
1. In a large mixing bowl, combine the flour and salt.
2. Add the olive oil and honey. Gradually pour in the tepid water while mixing until a soft dough forms.
3. Knead the dough on a lightly floured surface for about 10 minutes, or until smooth and elastic.
4. Lightly brush the dough with a small amount of canola oil, cover, and allow it to rest for at least 30 minutes.
5. Divide the dough into 10 equal portions and shape each portion into a ball.
6. Roll each ball into a thin circle on a lightly floured surface.
7. Brush the surface with a little canola oil.
8. Fold the left and right sides toward the center, then fold the top and bottom toward the center to form a square.
9. Repeat with the remaining dough portions.
10. Roll each square out again into a thin round flatbread.
11. Heat a large skillet or griddle over medium heat.
12. Place one flatbread onto the hot skillet and cook until slightly puffed, about 1–2 minutes.
13. Drizzle a small amount of oil on top, flip, and cook the other side until golden brown and lightly crisp.
14. Transfer to a plate and cover with a clean kitchen towel to keep warm.
15. Repeat with the remaining flatbreads.

== Serving ==
- Serve warm with honey, butter, or jam.
- Accompany with tea for breakfast.
- Pair with soups, stews, or meat dishes.

== See also ==
- Paratha
- Msemen
