= Safari (restaurant) =

Somali restaurant in New York City

Coordinates: 40°48′14″N 73°57′13″W

Safari is a restaurant specializing in Somali cuisine located in the Harlem neighborhood of New York, New York. As of 2020, it is believed to be the only Somali restaurant in New York City.

The restaurant opened in May 2015 and is located in an area called Le Petit Senegal, home to the highest concentration of West African immigrants in Manhattan. Owner Maymuuna Birjeeb was born in Kismayo, Somalia, and grew up in Sweden. Before opening Safari, she worked in banking. Decorations on the walls are relatively bare, noted by wooden wall carvings of the Osmanya alphabet. The restaurant's spices comes from Somalia.

The restaurant has received positive reviews from critics. The New York Times described Safari as a "gentle introduction for diners unaccustomed to Somali cuisine." New York magazine praised "goat and the pasta, which tastes like carbonara without the bacon, are so good that it’s hard to resist wolfing them down." AM New York Metro described the restaurant as providing "diners with a rare Eastern-African culinary experience that is as authentic as one can find in the tri-state area." Many Somalis in the area go to visit this restaurant, and say it feels like home.
