= Malawah =

Pancake originated from Somalia

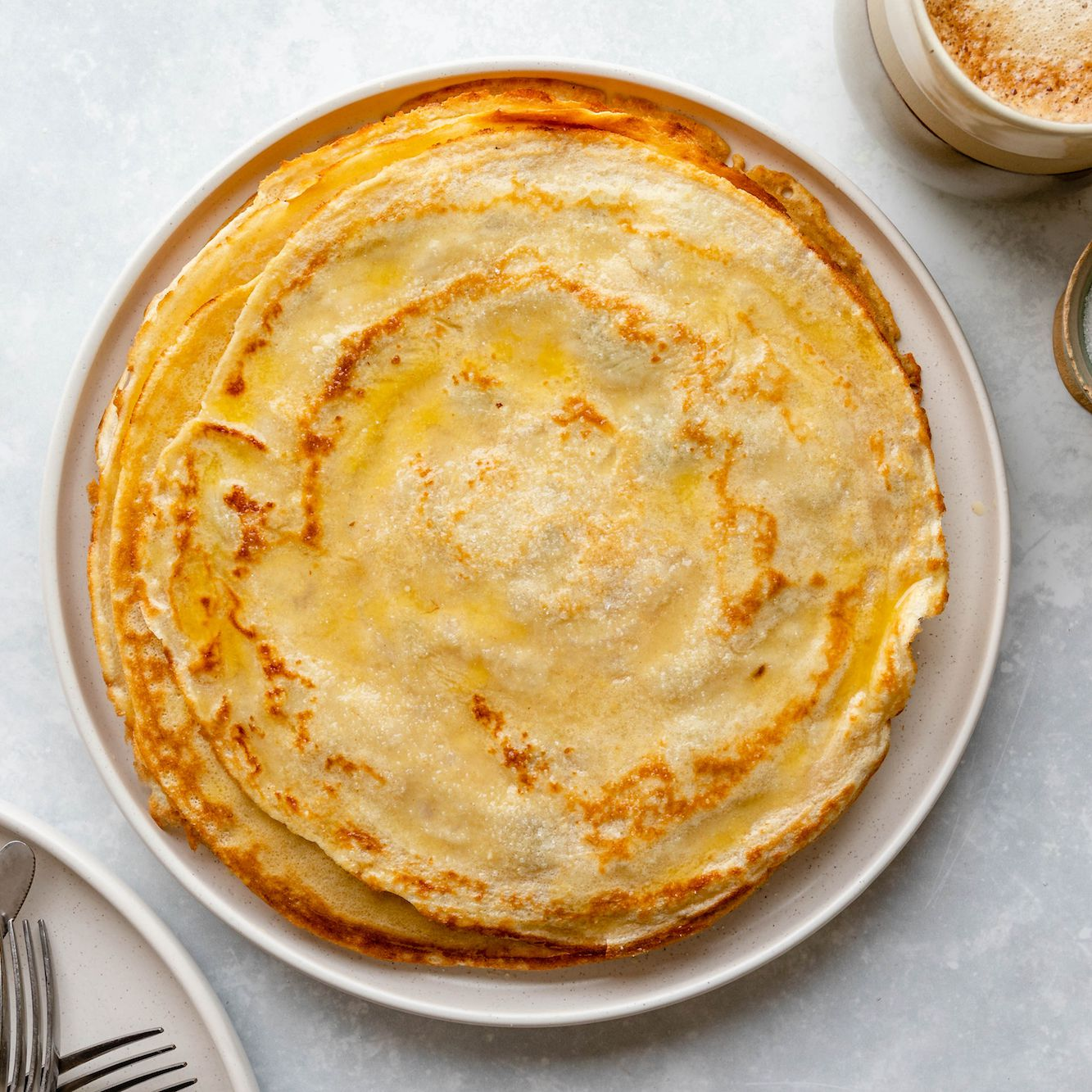
- Alternative names: Malawah
- Type: Flatbread/pancake
- Place of origin: Somalia
- Region or state: Somalia, Djibouti, Ethiopia, Kenya and Yemen
- Main ingredients: Flour, eggs, corn flour, milk, butter or ghee, sugar, cardamom
- Variations: Cambaabur, Laxoox

Malawah (Somali: Malawax 𐒐𐒖𐒄𐒝𐒄), also known as Malawax (Arabic: ملوح), is a sweet pancake. It has origins from Somalia and is eaten regularly in Somalia, Djibouti, The Ogaden region of Ethiopia Kenya, And Minnesota due to the Somali diaspora. It is also eaten in Yemen where it is possibly related to Malawach, although the latter is a flatbread.

== Overview ==
Malawah is a plate-sized sweet pancake that is eaten for breakfast or as a snack anytime during the day. It is similar to a sweet crepe and is flavored with cardamom.

== Preparation ==
Malawah is prepared from a batter consisting of flour, milk, eggs, sugar, and sometimes honey and spices such as cardamom and cinnamon, with a pinch of salt. The ingredients are mixed until smooth to form a pourable batter. The batter is then cooked on a lightly greased frying pan with butter or oil until golden brown on both sides. It is typically served with honey or sugar as a topping, and accompanied by tea.

== See also ==
- Laxoox
