= Oodkac =

Somali dish consisting of preserved meat

Muqmad/oodkac
- Course: Breakfast or lunch
- Region or state: Somali Peninsula
- Main ingredients: Meat

Muqmad or oodkac is a Somali dish consisting of preserved meat. The term muqmad is used in Djibouti, Ethiopia and Somaliland; the term oodkac is more popular in central and southern parts of Somalia and Kenya.

It is typically eaten with canjeero or lahoh, but sometimes by itself. Although it is usually eaten for breakfast and lunch, it is also sometimes eaten for dinner.

Muqmad or oodkac is made by letting the meat cook and soak in melted butter, and then cutting it into cubes.
