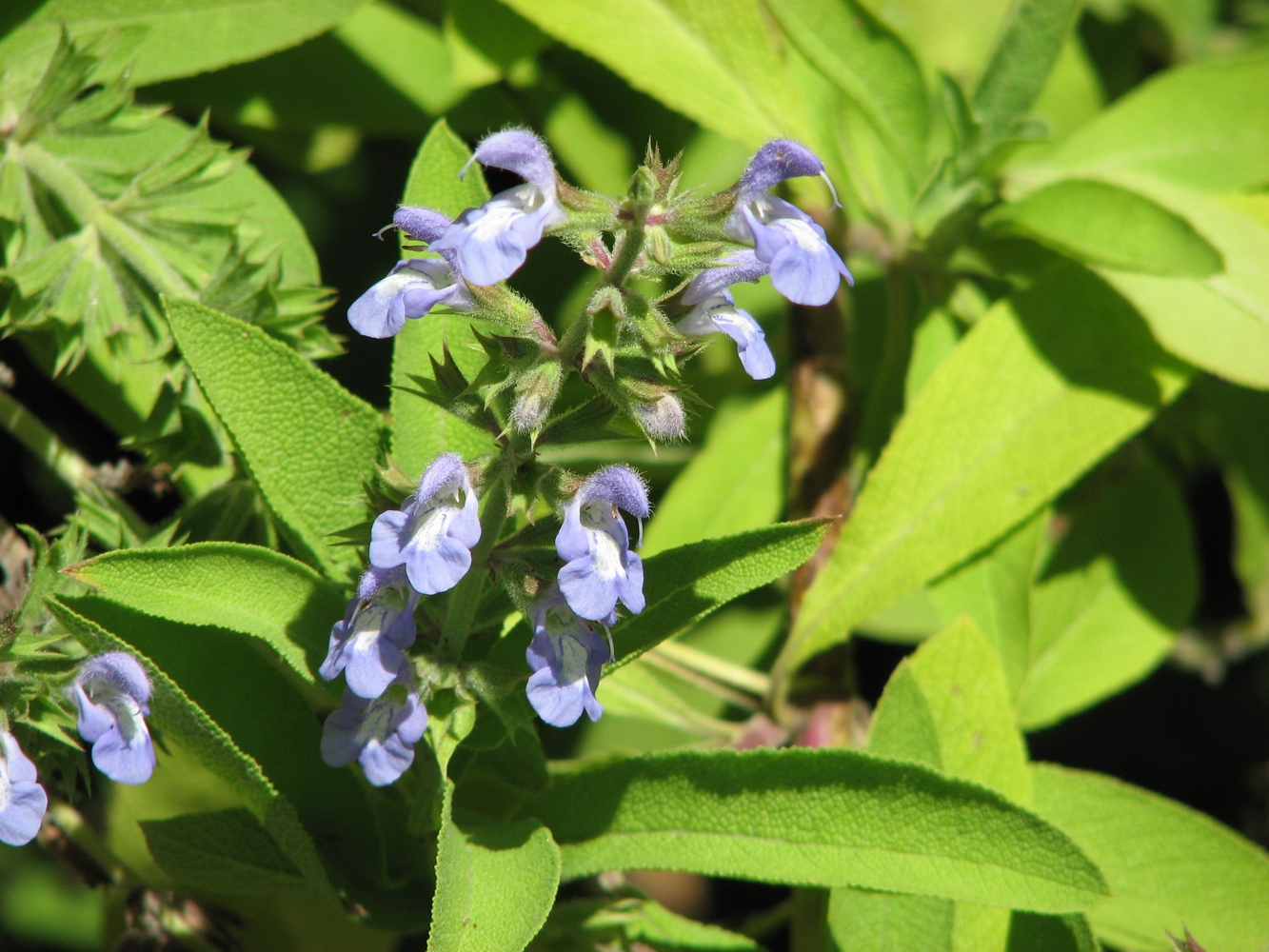

Scientific classification
- Kingdom: Plantae
- Clade: Tracheophytes
- Clade: Angiosperms
- Clade: Eudicots
- Clade: Asterids
- Order: Lamiales
- Family: Lamiaceae
- Genus: Salvia
- Species: S. somalensis

Binomial name
- Salvia somalensis Vatke

= Salvia somalensis =

Species of shrub

Salvia somalensis (Somalia sage) is a perennial shrub endemic to a limited range and elevation in Somalia. It grows at elevations from 4,000 feet (1,200 m) to 7,000 feet (2,100 m), typically in forest clearings or edges as a common or dominant subshrub.

Salvia somalensis is a many-stemmed rangy plant that grows up to 5 feet (1.5 m) high and 3 feet (0.91 m) wide. The leaves are oblong and yellow-green, reaching 4 inches (10 cm) long and 1 inch (2.5 cm) wide. The pale wisteria-blue flowers grow in tight, many-flowered whorls, growing on inflorescences that are unusual in that they do not always grow on the terminal ends of stems.
