= Bariis iskukaris =

Somali cuisine

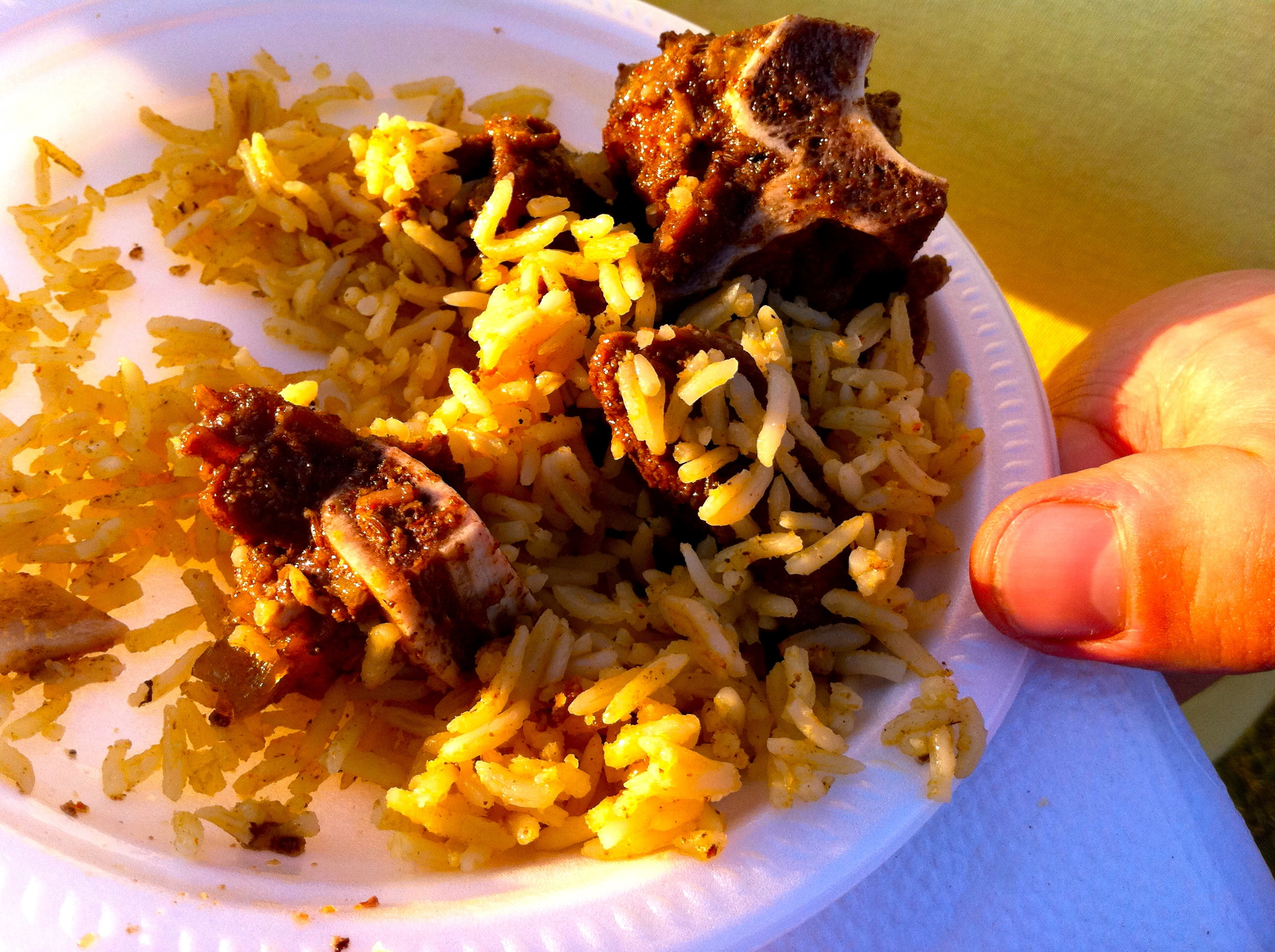
- Bariis with camel meat
- Course: lunch or dinner
- Place of origin: Somalia
- Region or state: East Africa
- Main ingredients: rice and meat

Bariis iskukaris, also called isku-dheh karis, is a traditional rice dish from Somali cuisine that is customarily cooked in a single pan or where the tenderization of both rice and stew occurs at some point in a single pan. The name isku-dheh karis literally means "cooked mixed together"; therefore, it is sometimes used to refer broadly to other grain-derived crops that require similar cooking. The more specific term for this dish is this bariis isku-dheh karis, which means "rice (bariis) cooked mixed together".

== Process ==
Because the different ingredients require different cooking times to make the ingredients tender or cooked, iskukaris is one of the more difficult rice dishes to cook. Since meat requires the longest cooking time, meat is usually the first ingredient to be placed in a iskukaris pan, followed by longer tenderizing vegetables such as potatoes, and then short-cooking vegetables are usually added at the same time as the rice. The addition of the rice is usually the trickiest part as it requires an experienced chef to ensure the surface rice cooks evenly with the middle-layered rice; this requires perfect timing.

Bariis iskukaris is made from basmati rice, and is typically topped with raisins, peas, and fried potatoes, onions and peppers, and served with roasted lamb, beef, goat, camel, or chicken. It is a national dish of Somalia and is especially popular at weddings and is a staple dish which is almost universally served as part of a Somali daily meal. It is almost always accompanied with a roasted meat dish, the most common being lamb or goat meat, and served with fresh bananas.

== Spices ==
The dish incorporates a spice mixture called xawaash which literally translates as "spices" in the Somali language and which is made from a mixture of ground cumin, turmeric, coriander, paprika, cardamon, black pepper, cloves, cinnamon and nutmeg. Xawaash comes from the Arabic word Hawa’ij (حوائج). Hawa’ij can be translated as ‘requirements’ or ‘essentials’ and is said to have originated in nearby Yemen. Either saffron or orange or red food coloring are added to the dish after the rice has finished cooking to give the dish an orange color.

== Serving method ==
Bariis iskukaris can be served with various meats including chicken, mutton, fish or camel meat. It is typically served with a banana on the side. This rice dish is often served from a clay pot called baris dhari, which serves to impart flavor from food cooked in metal pots. Bariis and meat dishes served with it are considered halal and as such are suitable for consumption by Muslims.

== Gallery ==
Somali bariis dishes

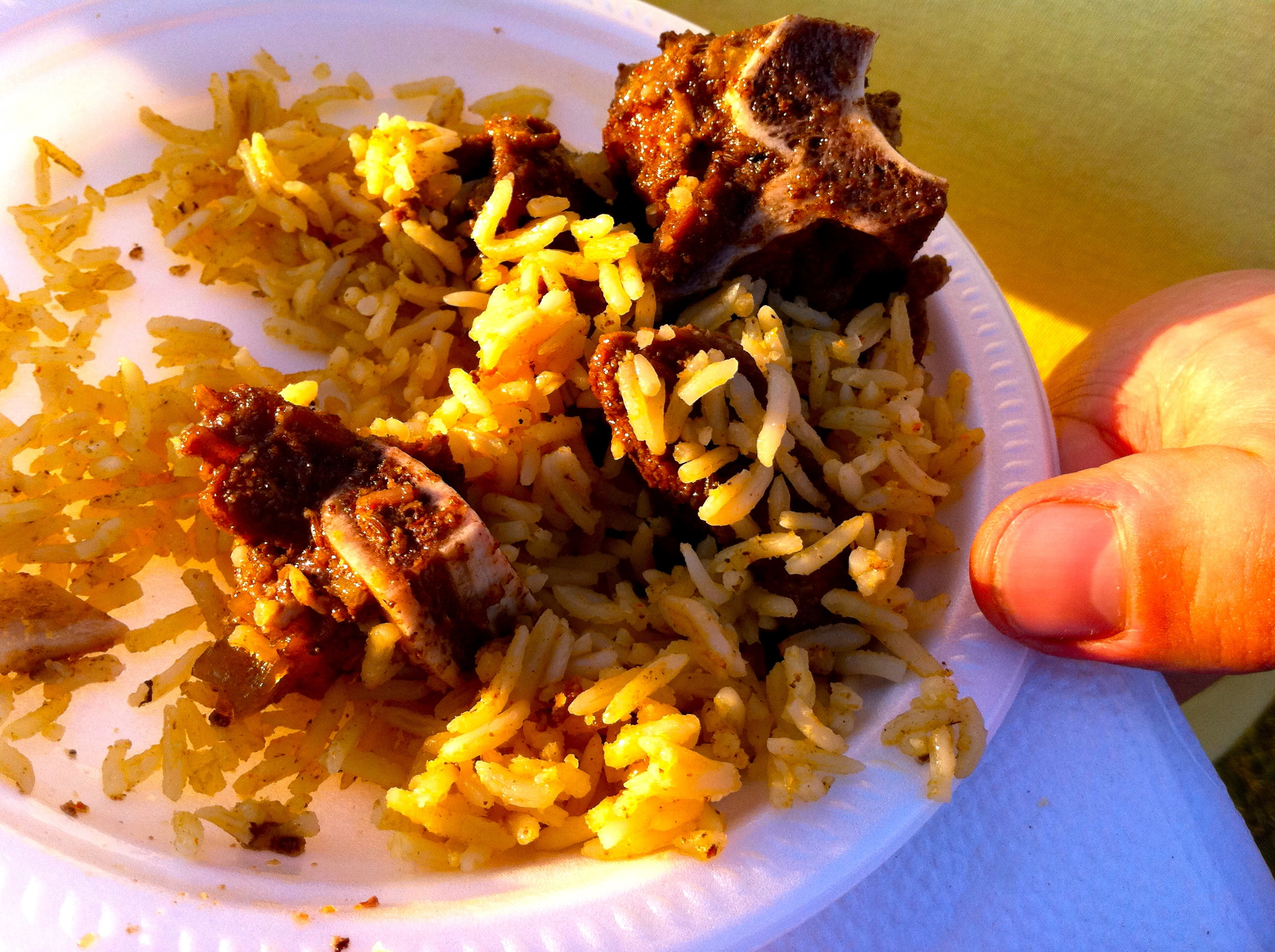
Bariis iskukaris with camel meat

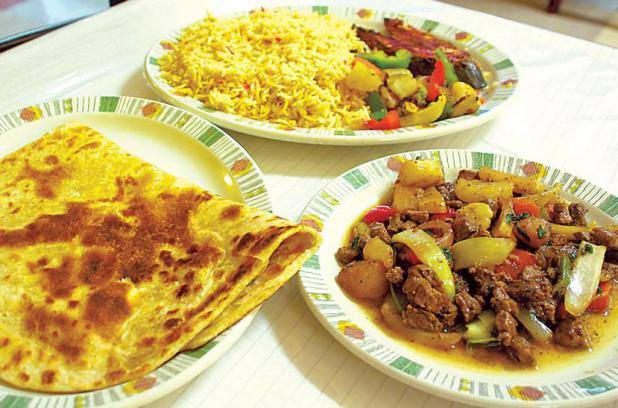
Bariis iskukaris with fish, liver and vegetables

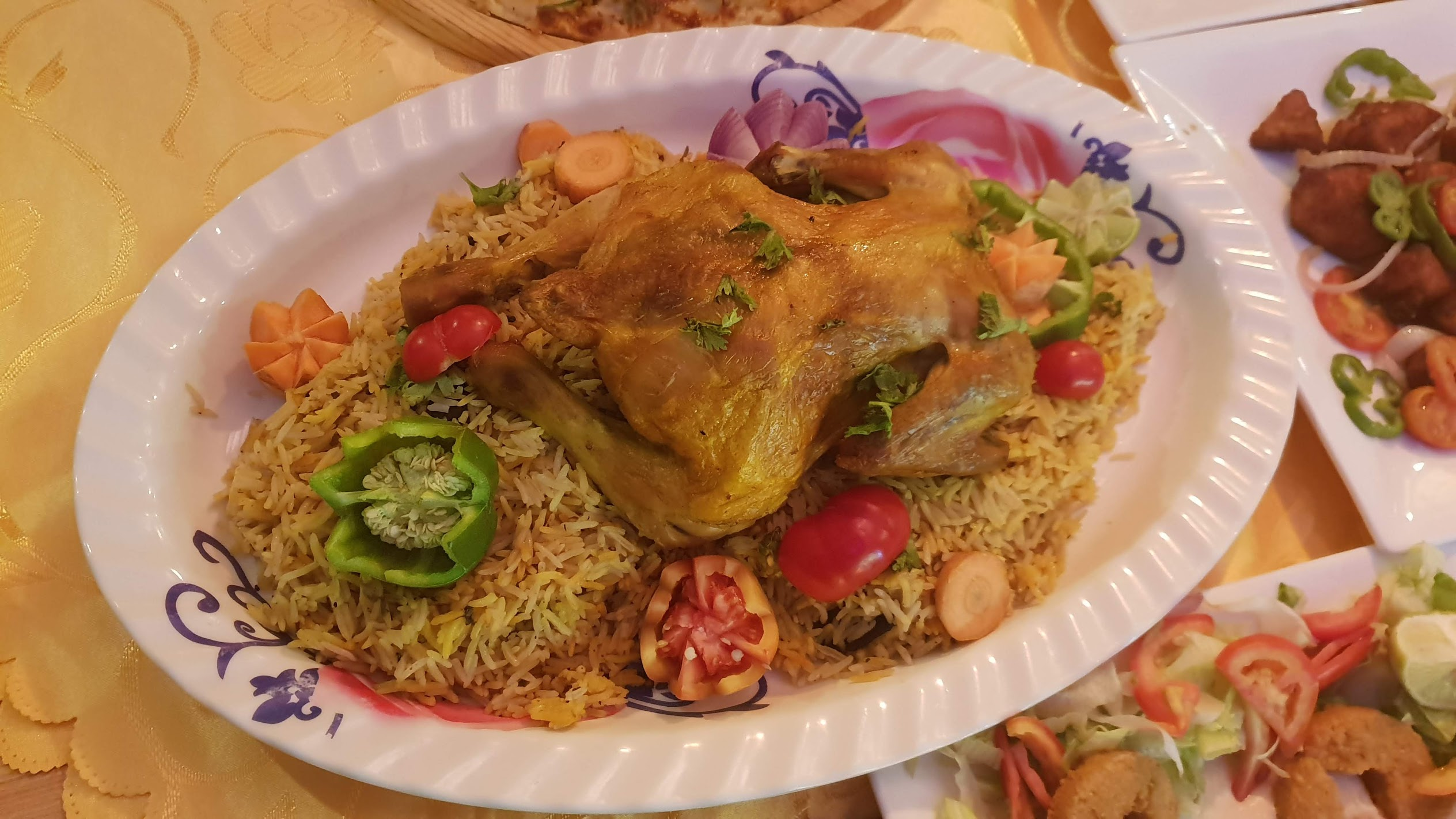
Bariis iskukaris with chicken
