= Lahoh =

Spongy bread originating from Somalia and Yemen.

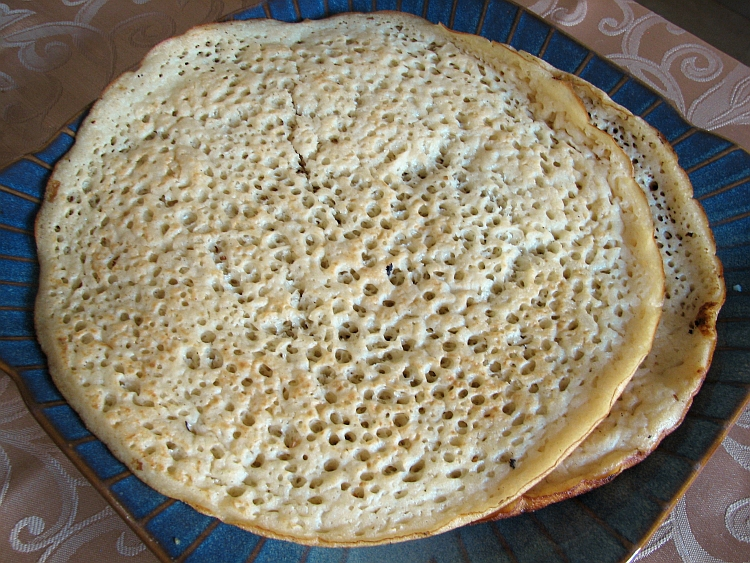
- Alternative names: Canjeero/Canjeelo
- Type: Flatbreads/pancake
- Place of origin: Horn of Africa and Yemen
- Region or state: East Africa and Middle East
- Associated cuisine: Somali cuisine, Yemeni cuisine
- Main ingredients: Plain flour, sorghum flour, wheat flour, self-rising flour, white cornmeal/cornflour, yeast, salt
- Variations: Cambaabur

Lahoh (Arabic: لحوح, romanized: laḥūḥ [laħuːħ], Somali: laxoox) is a spongy, flat pancake-like bread. It is a type of flatbread eaten regularly in Somaliland, Somalia, Djibouti, Kenya, Ethiopia, Yemen and Saudi Arabia. Yemenite Jewish immigrants popularized the dish in Israel. It is also called canjeero/canjeelo in Somalia.

== Preparation ==
Lahoh is traditionally and typically prepared from a thick batter of sorghum flour (preferred flour for making Laxoox), White cornmeal/cornflour, warm water, yeast, and a pinch of salt. The mixture is beaten by hand until soft and creamy. The batter is then left to ferment overnight, to cook, and then is eaten for breakfast.

== Cultural Variations ==
=== Somali ===
Somali Laxoox/canjeero is made from a batter comprised typically of legumes or cereals other than wheat, in addition to herbs and spices to taste, usually due to a scarcity of wheat production. Some cooks enhance fermentation using a microbial starter consisting of previous batter known as dhanaanis, which speeds fermentation.

Somalis historically relied on cajiin, a pre-gelatinized dough made from sorghum (or other non-glutinous or low-gluten grains) and hot water in a manual process taking 1 to 2 days. Heating with water causes the starch to gelatinize and act like gluten, helping the batter trap air. This makes the dough more stable and allows the bread to stay flexible enough to get the desired texture from low-gluten or gluten-free flours, such as sorghum. Although today, it's not typically used outside of southern Somalia.

The modern-day production of Somali laxoox/canjeero is relatively consistent, but there are differences corresponding broadly to regional differences in production methods and the availability of food processing equipment. There is a sweet-tasting variety of the dish, one made with eggs, as well as another variety that is spiced and typically eaten at breakfast during Eid called cambaabur (ambabuur). It is traditionally baked on a metallic circular stove called dhaawe or dawa. Lacking that, it can also be baked in an ordinary pan.

=== Yemeni ===
In Yemen, Lahoh is described as a "festive pancake". It is normally made with a unique white sorghum called dhura baida. The process of making Yemeni lahoh is most similar to Somaliland in terms of ingredients, fermentation, and baking, and has evolved with modern household tools like blenders and refrigeration. However, some differences are observable. Visually, the spiral pattern typical of the Somali laxoox is uncommon in the Yemeni lahoh.

A slurry mix of flour and hot water called sharaba is utilized in the initial sourdough batch. Traditionally, the lahoh would be naturally fermented by letting it stand for a day or more giving it a sour flavor. Instead nowadays yeast is generally used, and some cooks opt to add sugar. Skillets are also sometimes preferred over the more traditional clay or metal griddles.

In Aruuq, a village near Tais, there is a special type of lahoh called lahoh Ariiqy not found anywhere else. This version differs from the other kinds seen more commonly in the region such as the Sanaa'ani style and is much larger. It's baked on a circular griddle called a saj and has a distinct zebra stripe pattern.

== Regional consumption ==
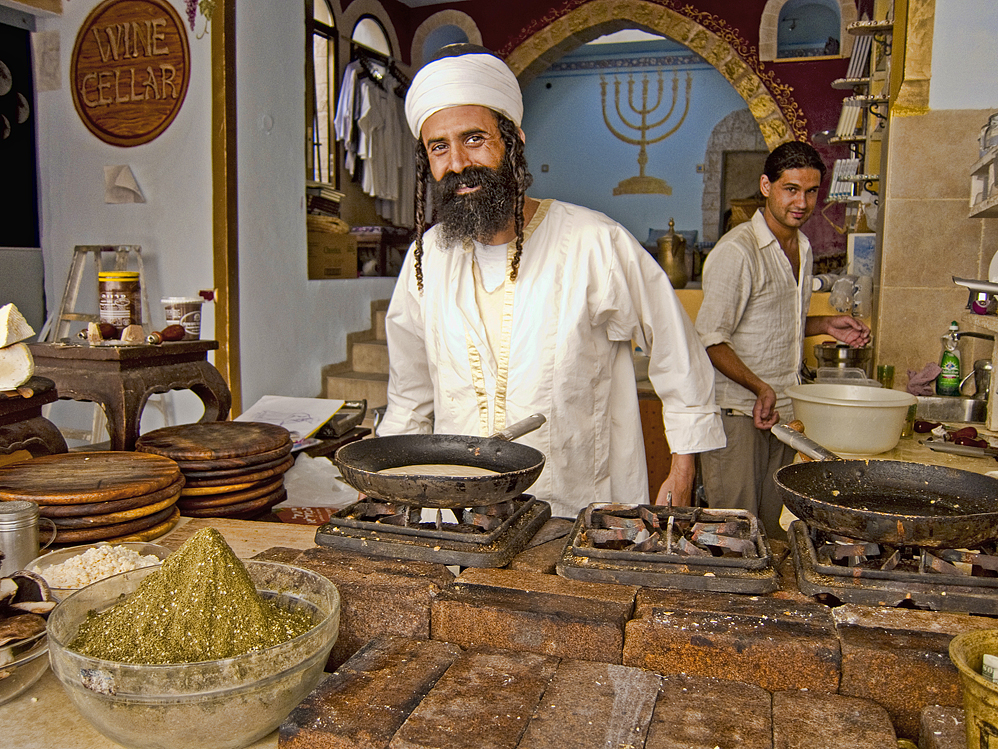
Yemenite Jews preparing Lahoh in Tzfat, Israel

In Somalia, Djibouti, and in parts of Ethiopia and Kenya, for breakfast, it is consumed with subag (a Somali butter/ghee), olive oil, sesame oil, and sugar or honey or "beer" (liver and onions), "suqaar" (stir-fry meat), or with "odkac/muqmad". Occasionally, it is eaten for lunch with a Somali stew, soup, or curry. It is almost always consumed with Somali tea.

In Yemen, the bread may be served as an appetizer in a dish known as shafuta. It may also be eaten with saltah and condiments like zhug. It can also be found in Israel, where it was introduced by Yemenite Jews who immigrated there.

== See also ==
- Dosa
- Uttappam
- Appam
- Baghrir
- Injera
- Crumpet
