= Fah-fah =

Djiboutian soup

- Type: Stew
- Course: Lunch
- Place of origin: Djibouti
- Main ingredients: Meat (goat, camel) and vegetables (carrots, potatoes, onions, etc.)

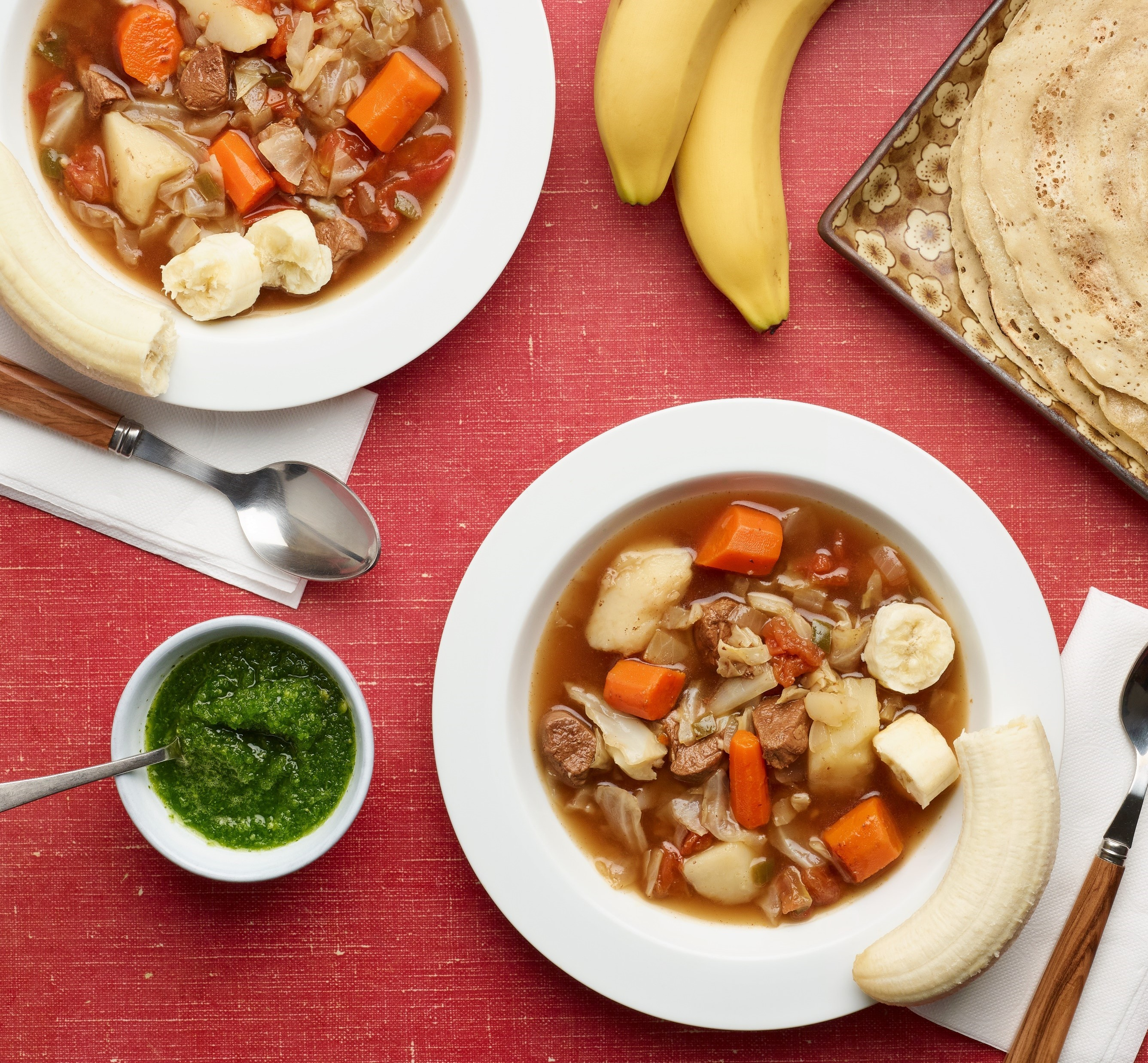
Fahfah

Fah-fah is a Djiboutian soup, mostly eaten in southern parts of the country, as well as northern Somalia. It is popular in East African cuisine. Fah-fah is typically made of goat meat with vegetables and green chilies.

== Ingredients ==
Fah-fah is commonly prepared using goat meat, although beef or lamb may also be used. Other ingredients typically include:

- Potatoes
- Cabbage or kale
- Leeks
- Tomatoes
- Onions
- Garlic
- Green chili peppers
- Coriander
- Salt
- Black pepper

The combination of meat, vegetables, and spices produces a flavorful broth that forms the basis of the dish.

== Preparation ==
Fah-fah is traditionally prepared by simmering meat together with vegetables in water to create a rich soup. The meat and vegetables are placed in a cooking pot, covered with water, and cooked over moderate heat. Garlic and coriander are generally added during the cooking process, and additional water may be incorporated as needed. The soup is simmered until the meat becomes tender and the vegetables are fully cooked.

== See also ==
- List of African dishes
