= National symbols of Yemen =

The national symbols of Yemen are official flags, icons or cultural expressions that are emblematic, representative or otherwise characteristic of Yemen and of its culture.

== Symbol ==
Title	Name of Symbol	Picture
National flag	Flag of Yemen	
Coat of arms	Coat of arms of Yemen	
National anthem	United Republic composed by Ayoob Tarish	
