= Culture of Yemen =

The culture of Yemen has an ancient cultural history. Due to its unique geographic location, Yemen has acquired a very distinctive culture from its neighbors, historically and culturally.

== Literature ==
Literature in Yemen encompasses both folk literature such as traditional songs, oral stories and poetry, as well as the works of modern writers of poetry, fiction, non-fiction and drama. According to Mark Wagner, an academic on Arabic literature, "Yemeni authors through the years have tackled a range of themes, including emigration, exile, racism, Muslim-Jewish relations, and cultural pluralism." Ahmad bin Abdullah Al Saqqaf's 1927 book, "The Girl from Garut", is regarded as the first novel by a Yemeni writer.

Besides the large number of works inspired by Islamic oral or written literature, there was a distinct Yemenite Jewish tradition of poetry and prose until the exodus of Yemenite Jews around 1950.

Women are notable voices in Yemeni poetry. The first known Socotran (an island off the coast) poet is Fatima al-Suqutriyya, who was active during the ninth and early tenth centuries. Zaynab bint Muhammad al-Shahariyyah died in 1702, but whose fragmentary works have a "respectable" place in Yemeni literature.

== Music ==
The music of Yemen is primarily known abroad for a series of pan-Arab popular stars. In the Arab world, Yemen has long been a cultural center. Yemen's national anthem is "United Republic" written by Abdallah "al-Fadhool" Abdul Wahab Noman.

UNESCO proclaimed the tradition of poetic songs in Sanaa, called al-Ghina al-San'ani, a Masterpiece of the Oral and Intangible Heritage of Humanity on November 7, 2003.

== Theatre ==
The history of Yemeni theatre dates back at least a century, to the early 1900s. Both amateur and professional (government-sponsored) theatre troupes perform in the country's major urban centers. Many of Yemen's significant poets and authors, such as Ali Ahmad Bakathir, Muhammad al-Sharafi, and Wajdi al-Ahdal, have written dramatic works; poems, novels, and short stories by Yemeni authors, such as Mohammad Abdul-Wali and Abdulaziz Al-Maqaleh, have also been adapted for the stage. There have been Yemeni productions of plays by Arab authors, such as Tawfiq al-Hakim and Saadallah Wannous, as well as by Western authors, including Shakespeare, Pirandello, Brecht, and Tennessee Williams. Historically speaking, the southern port city of Aden is the cradle of Yemeni theatre; in recent decades, the capital city of Sanaa, has hosted numerous theatre festivals, often in conjunction with World Theatre Day.

== Cuisine ==
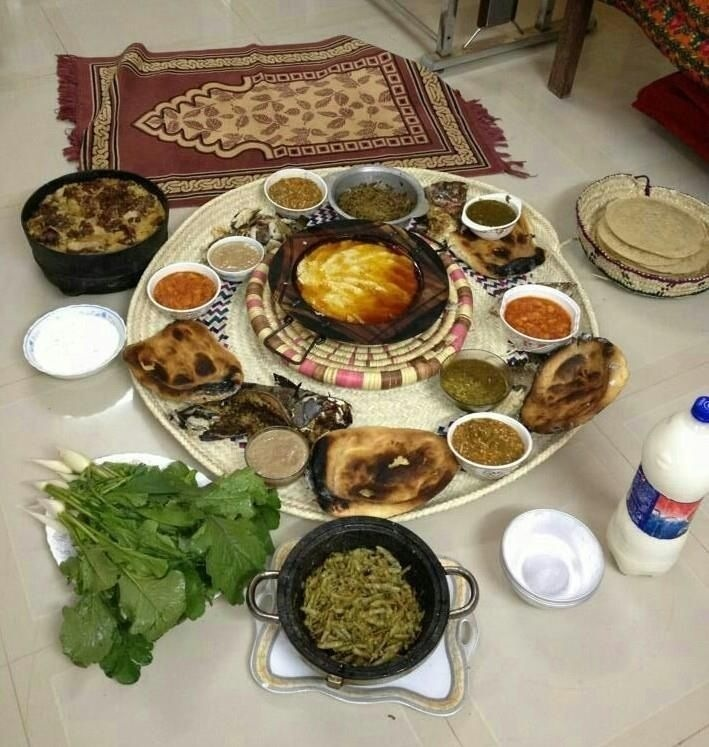
A typical Yemeni breakfast

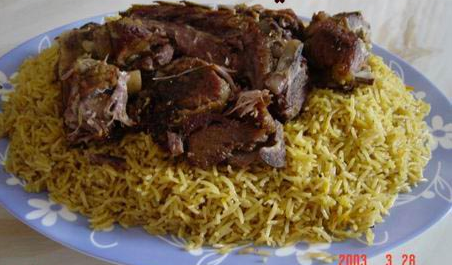
Homemade mandi is considered the national dish of Yemen; it is originally from the province of Hadhramaut, Yemen.

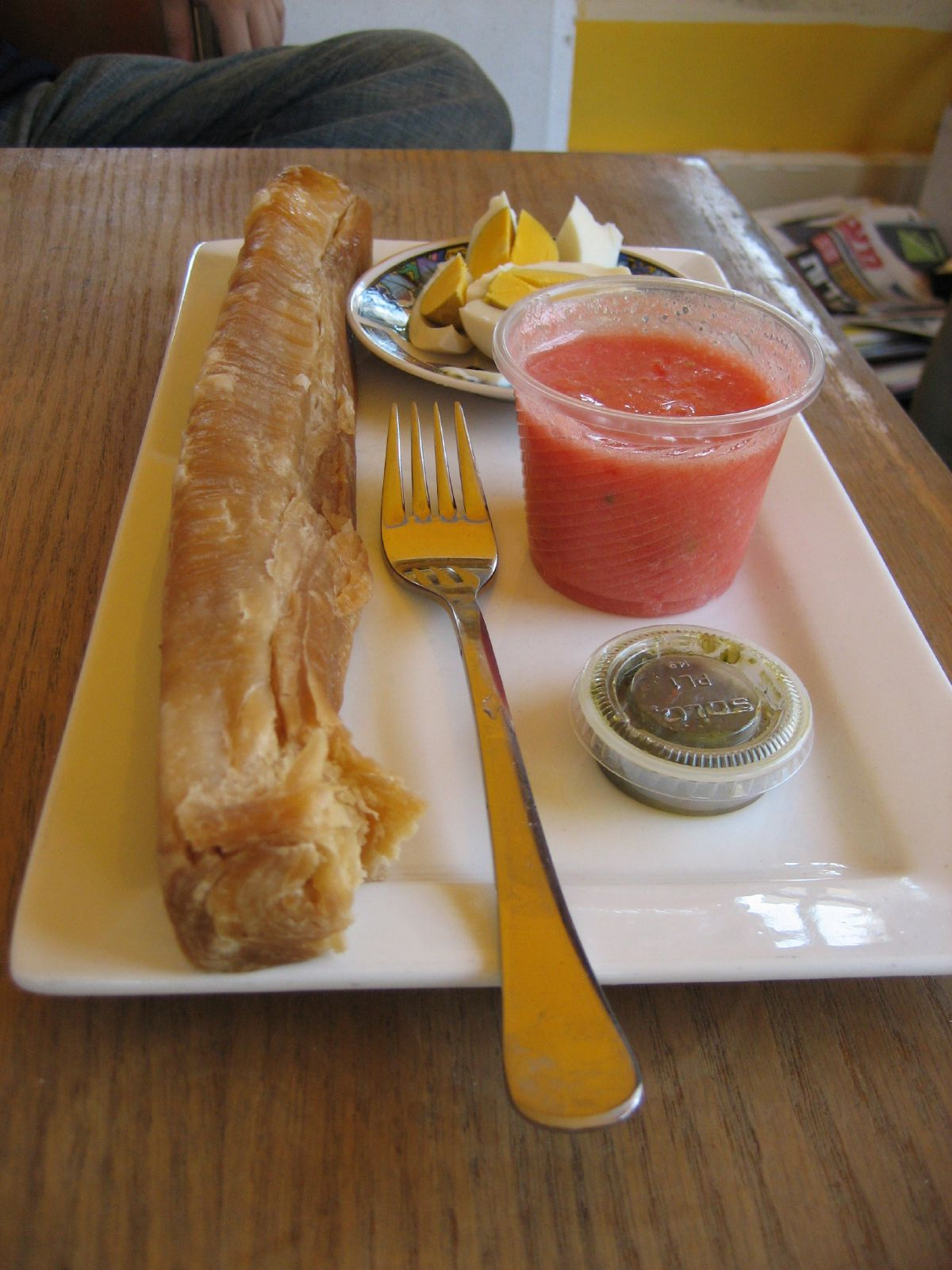
Jachnun served with oven-baked egg, fresh-grated tomato, and zhug

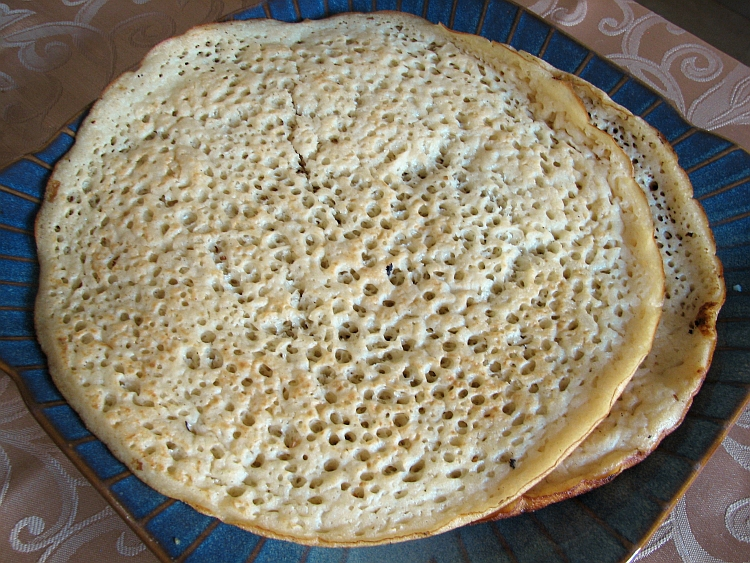
Lahuh

Yemeni cuisine is entirely distinct from the more widely known Middle Eastern cuisines, and even differs slightly from region to region.

Chicken, goat, and lamb are eaten more often than beef, which is expensive. Fish is also eaten, especially in the coastal areas.

Cheese, butter, and other dairy products are less common in the Yemeni diet. Buttermilk, however, is enjoyed almost daily in some villages where it is most available. The most commonly used fats are vegetable oil and ghee used in savory dishes, while semn (clarified butter) is the choice of fat used in pastries.

Although each region has their own variation, saltah is considered the national dish. The base is a brown meat stew called maraq, a dollop of fenugreek froth, and sahawiq or sahowqa (a mixture of chili peppers, tomatoes, garlic, and herbs ground into a salsa). Rice, potatoes, scrambled eggs, and vegetables are common additions to saltah. It is eaten traditionally with Yemeni flatbread, which serves as a utensil to scoop up the food.

Shakshouka is a popular dish in Yemen. Shakshouka is made with eggs, meat, tomatoes, peppers, onions, and spices (often including cumin, turmeric, and chili peppers). It is usually served with Yemeni flatbread or white bread as a utensil.

Other popular dishes include aseed, fahsa, thareed, samak mofa, mandi, kabsa, fattah, shafut, and fatoot.

Shahi haleeb (milk tea, served after qat), black tea (with cardamom, clove, or mint), qishr (coffee husks), qahwa (coffee), karkadin (an infusion of dried hibiscus flowers), Naqe'e Al Zabib (cold raisin drink), and diba'a (squash nectar) are examples of popular Yemeni drinks. Mango and guava juices are also popular.

Malooga and lahooh are the most popular kinds of flat breads found in Yemen. Malooga is eaten with bean dishes, such as ful medames (similar to rice and beans). Lahooh is eaten with curries, stews, and soups, as well as rice dishes.

Bint al-sahn is a popular dessert dish, which is eaten with honey.

== Qat ==
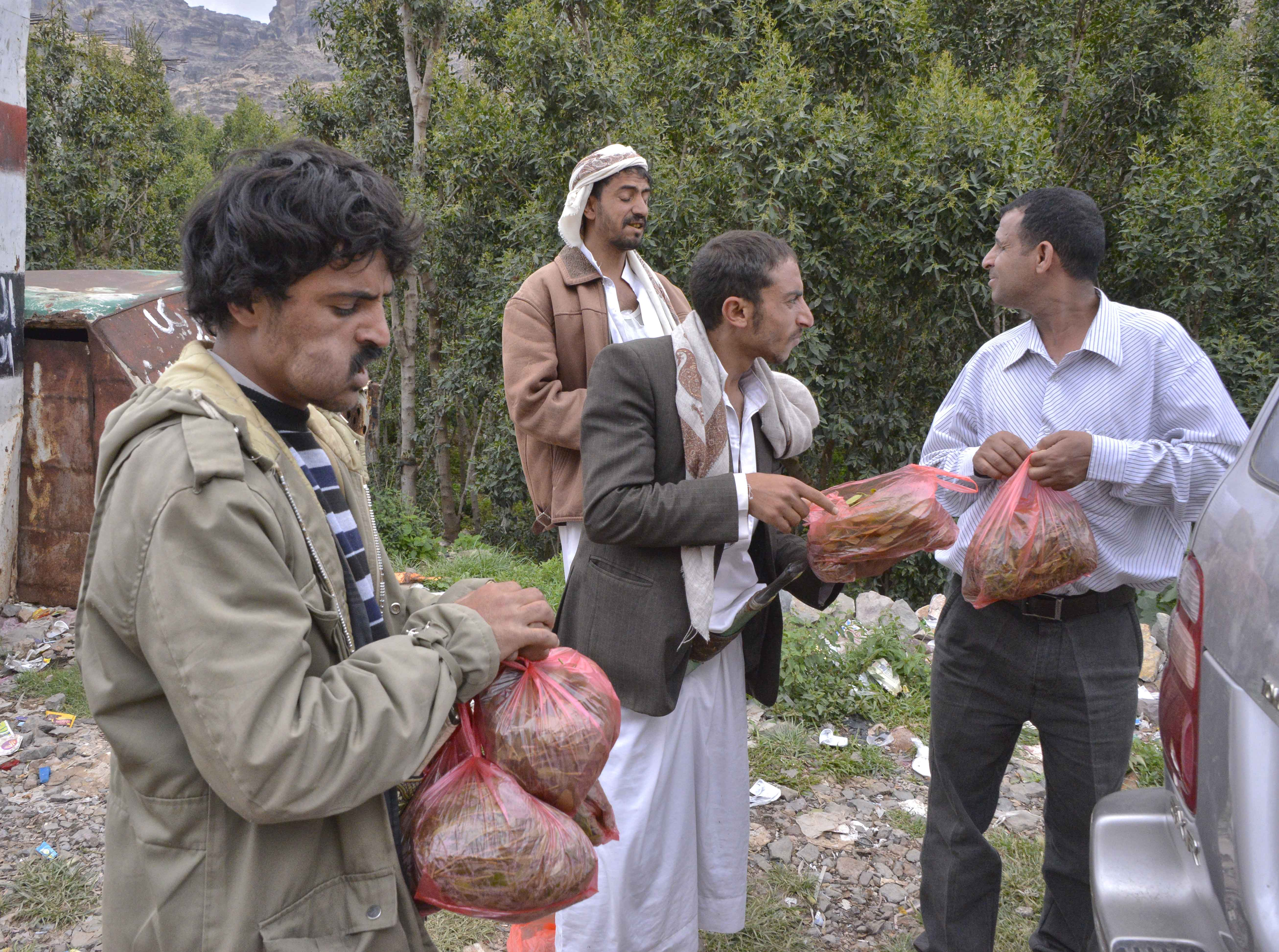
A Yemeni man chewing and selling Qat

Qat, also known as Khat (Catha edulis), is a widely cultivated plant in Yemen and is generally used for chewing. When khat juice is swallowed it produces an amphetamine-like effect. Yemenis wear traditional costumes and chew the narcotic khat-plant in the afternoons. Chewing khat is also part of the Yemeni business culture to promote decision-making, but it does not expect foreigners to participate.

== Sports ==
Football is the most popular sport in Yemen. The Yemeni national football team competes in the FIFA and AFC leagues. The country also hosts many football clubs. They compete in the national and international leagues.

Yemen's mountains provide many opportunities for outdoor sports, such as biking, rock climbing, trekking, hiking, skiing, mountain jumping, and other more challenging sports, including mountain climbing. Mountain climbing and hiking tours to the Sarawat Mountains and the Jabal An-Nabi Shu'ayb, including the 5,000 m peaks in the region, are seasonally organized by local and international alpine agencies.

The coastal areas of Yemen and Socotra island also provide many opportunities for water sports, such as surfing, bodyboarding, sailing, swimming, and scuba diving. Socotra island is home to some of the best surfing destinations in the world.

== Education ==
Yemen is ranked 150 out of 177 in the 2006 Human Development Index and 121 out of 140 countries in the Gender Development Index (2006). Yemen is still struggling to provide the requisite infrastructure. School facilities and educational materials are of poor quality, classrooms are too few in number, and the teaching faculty is inadequate, which is why education is very poor in Yemen.

The government of Yemen has made the development of education system their top priority. Their budget share dedicated to education has remained high during the past decade, averaging between 14 and 20% of the total government expenditure. As of 2000 it is 32.8 percent. The education expenditure is 9.6 percent in 2001. In the strategic vision for the next 25 years since 2000, the government has committed to bring significant change for the education system, thereby reducing illiteracy to less than 10% by 2025.

== Architecture ==
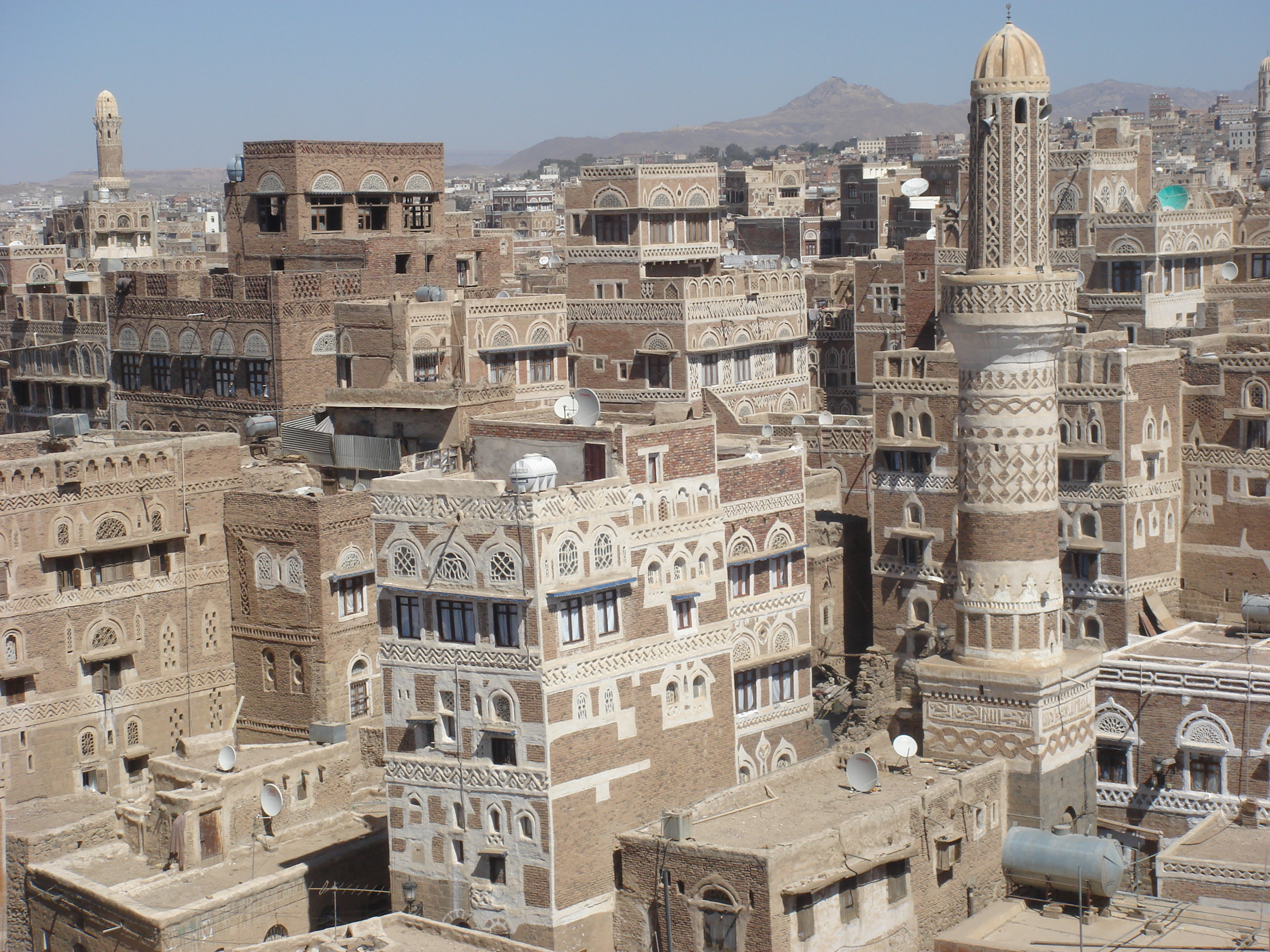
Historic cityscape of old Sanaa, a UNESCO World Heritage Site

The history of architecture in Yemen begins in ancient times, when a tradition of South Arabian architecture flourished in the region thanks to the rise of city states that grew wealthy on trade. Developments continued during the Islamic period, displaying both local characteristics and external influences. The historic cities and towns of Yemen are also famous for their traditional tower-houses, built of mud-brick or stone and rising to several stories tall. The old cities of Sanaa, Shibam, and Zabid are designated as UNESCO World Heritage Sites.

== See also ==
- History of Yemen
- Geography of Yemen
- Demographics of Yemen
- Disability in Yemen
- Qat in Yemen
