= National Anthem of the People's Democratic Republic of Yemen =

National Anthem of People's Democratic Republic of Yemen
- National anthem of Former national anthem of South Yemen
- Music: Abdulqader Jumaa Khan
- Adopted: 1967
- Relinquished: 1979
- Succeeded by: Repeat, O World, My Song

Audio sample
- National Anthem of the People's Democratic Republic of Yemen: file; help

The National Anthem of the People's Democratic Republic of Yemen (Arabic: النشيد الوطني لجمهورية اليمن الديمقراطية الشعبية) was the national anthem of South Yemen after independence from the British Empire. It was composed by Abdulqader Jumaa Khan.

Two national anthems were used by South Yemen before the unification of Yemen, this one and the anthem, "Repeat, O World, My Song." Parts of the second anthem are still used as the current national anthem of the Republic of Yemen.

== See also ==
- A Nation's Will
- United Republic
