= Wajdi al-Ahdal =

Yemeni novelist, short story writer and playwright

Wajdi al-Ahdal (Arabic: وجدي الأهدل, born 1973) is a Yemeni novelist, short story writer and playwright. Laureate of the International Prize for Arabic Fiction (IPAF) in 2008, is known for his contemporary literary style and sometimes socially critical works, some of which have been censored in Yemen. Until 2019, he has published five novels, four collections of short stories, a play and a film screenplay.

== Life and career ==
Wajdi al-Ahdal was born near Bajil in the province of Al Hudaydah and studied at the University of Sanaa. His first short stories were published in 1995 in a Yemeni newspaper, and later in Aswat magazine, which was edited by Yemeni poet Abdul Aziz al-Maqaleh.

In 2002, al-Ahdal's novel Qawarib Jabaliya (Mountain Boats) was confiscated by the Yemeni Ministry of Culture for insulting ‘morality, religion, and conventions of Yemeni society’. To avoid imprisonment, he spent some time in exile in Syria before being able to return to Yemen.

A more recent novel, The Quarantine Philosopher was nominated for the International Prize for Arabic Fiction (IPAF) in 2008. In 2010, al-Ahdal was selected as one of the invited writers for Beirut39, a group of 39 Arab writers under the age of 40, chosen through a contest organised by Banipal magazine and the Hay Festival. He was also chosen by IPAF to be one of the seven participants in its writers' workshop Nadwa in 2010.

al-Ahdal's works have been translated into English in a number of anthologies:

- Oranges in the Sun: Contemporary Short Stories from the Arabian Gulf (2006)
- Beirut 39: New Writing from the Arab World (2010)
- Emerging Arab Voices: Nadwa 1: A Bilingual Reader (2011)
- Banipal 36: Literature in Yemen Today
- Banipal 65: Contains a chapter from his novel Land of Happy Conspiracies

His novel A Land without Jasmine was translated into English by William M. Hutchins. This translation won the 2013 Banipal Prize for Arabic Literary Translation. According to the Banipal Trust, "Wajdi’s book is in a category all its own, fusing together elements of police procedural, myth, fable, psychological thriller and scathing social critique."

He currently works in the cinema and drama department of the Yemeni Ministry of Culture.

== See also ==
- Modern Arabic literature
- Culture of Yemen
- Theatre in Yemen
