= Theatre of Yemen =

Theatre has been performed in Yemen since the early years of the twentieth century. It is, as elsewhere, a public and social genre: performances take place in cultural centers, at universities, at schools and language institutes, in public parks and squares, as well as at more intimate gatherings, such as wedding celebrations. By the count of one scholar of Yemeni theatre, a minimum of five hundred plays of all kinds have been performed in Yemen over the course of the last century, around three hundred and seventy of which are by Yemeni authors; there are also around one hundred published Yemeni play scripts. Some of these plays have taken uniquely Yemeni themes as their subject matter: particular moments or celebrated figures from Yemeni history, like Bilqis, the legendary Queen of Sheba; the 1962 revolution against the Hamid al-Din Imamate in the North; or the 1967 revolution against the British colonial forces in the South. But Yemeni performances have also drawn upon other traditions, including Egyptian drama, like the works of Yusuf Idris, Alfred Farag, and Tawfiq al-Hakim, and on texts by European playwrights such as William Shakespeare, Jean Racine, Bertolt Brecht, and Luigi Pirandello. Performances vary in type from tragedy to improvised comedy, from musical to experimental theatre, from naturalistic plays to theatre of the absurd.

== History ==
According to Yemeni theatre historian Sa'id Aulaqi, the first play publicly performed by Yemeni actors was Shakespeare's Julius Caesar, in Arabic translation, staged in the city of Aden in 1910. Shakespeare proved popular with Yemeni audiences: subsequent decades saw performances of Romeo and Juliet, Hamlet, The Merchant of Venice, and Othello. But Yemeni playwrights and actors also created their own texts. Some of these plays sought to criticize the British occupying forces in Aden and the surrounding area, and to call for independence. Others were less overtly political—romantic comedies, or dramatizations of foundational events in Islamic history. The first full-length comedy performed in Yemeni dialect, Masrur Mabruk's Tarfisha and Shorban, took place in 1941. Performances in the early decades of the 20th century often took place in public squares or in schools, since no theatres per se existed. Only men acted, as in the Elizabethan era, and some became famous for interpreting female characters. This remained the case until 1956, when Nabiha Azim became the first Yemeni woman to appear on stage. It is also important to note that, in the first half of the 20th century, almost all performances occurred in the south of Yemen, most notably in Aden. In the North, under the Imamate, theatrical performances were much rarer.

The 1960s were a decade of revolution both North and South, and many Yemeni performances from these years took revolution as their theme, reflecting upon the military and political upheavals and the challenges of building new states and societies. The governments of the Yemen Arab Republic and the People's Democratic Republic of Yemen (North and South Yemen respectively) demonstrated their interest in theatre by establishing National Theatre Troupes and supporting theatre festivals. Yemeni theatre faced new challenges in the 1980s as a result of economic crises and political upheaval (war in 1979 between North and South Yemen, a civil war in the South in 1986). The celebrations that greeted the unification of North and South as the Republic of Yemen in 1990 were short-lived. Civil war broke out in 1994, amidst a background of economic hardship resulting from the expulsion of Yemeni workers from Saudi Arabia in the wake of the first Gulf War. Performances continued, however, both independently and under the auspices of the government, which sponsored important theatre festivals in the 1990s that showcased the work of theatre troupes from each of Yemen's provinces.

The 21st century has seen a resurgence of theatre in Yemen, with foreign embassies, INGOs, and local organizations and institutes sponsoring theatrical productions. Among Yemen's most notable contemporary actors and directors are ‘Amr Jamal and the Khalij Aden acting troupe, Amin Hazaber, Nargis ‘Abbad, Nabil Hizam, Ibrahim al-‘Ashmuri, and Saleh al-Saleh. The Global Shakespeares webpage, hosted by MIT, recently added its first-ever page featuring a Yemeni production, a scene from Aismur Ma'ish al-Siraj, directed by Hazaber (2012, 2013).

== Bibliography ==
=== Books In Arabic ===
- al-Asmar, Husayn. al-Masraḥ fī al-Yaman: taǧribah wa ṭumūḥ (Theatre in Yemen: Experience and Ambition), Al-Manār al-‘Arabī Press, Giza 1991.
- ‘Aulaqi, Sa’id. Saba’un ‘Aaman min al-Masrah fii al-Yaman (Seventy Years of Yemeni Theatre), Wazārat al-Ṯaqāfah wa ’l-Sīyaḥa, Aden 1983.
- al-Maqāliḥ, ‘Abd al-‘Azīz. Awwaliyyāt al-masraḥ fī al-Yaman (Elements of Theatre in Yemen). al-Mu’assah al-ǧām‘iah lil-dirāsāt wa ’l-našr wa ’l-ṭawābi‘, Beirut 1999.
- Sa‘īd, ‘Abd al-Maǧīd Muḥammad. Nušūʾ wa taṭawwur al-masraḥ fī al-Yaman 1910 ilà 2000 (The Growth and Development of Theatre in Yemen, 1910-2000). Wazārat al-Ṯaqāfah, Ṣan‘ā’, 2010.
- Sayf, Yahya Muhammad. ‘Ālam al-adab wa ’l-fann al-masraḥī fī al-Yaman (Great Names in the Literature and Art of the Theatre in Yemen), al-Hay’ah al-‘āmah lil-kuttāb, Ṣan‘ā’ 2006.
- Sayf, Yahya Muhammad. Al-Mukhtasar al-mufid fi al-Masrah al-arabi al-jadid: al-Masrah fi al-Yaman (A Useful Introduction to New Arabic Theatre: Theatre in Yemen. Arab Theatre Institute, Sharjah 2009.

=== Books and Academic Articles In English ===
- Caton, Steven C., Katherine Hennessey, and Mohammed Sharafuddin. “Yemeni literature.” In Yemen: Geography and World Culture Series. ABC-CLIO, 2013.
- Hennessey, Katherine. “Staging a Protest: Socio-Political Criticism in Contemporary Yemeni Theatre.” In Doomed by Hope: Essays on Arab Theatre, ed. Eyad Houssami. Pluto, 2012.
- Hennessey, Katherine. “Yemeni Society in the Spotlight: Theatre and Film in Yemen Before, During, and After the Arab Spring.” In Why Yemen Matters: A Society in Transition, ed. Helen Lackner. Saqi, 2014.
- Makaleh, Abdul Aziz. "Yemen," in The World Encyclopedia of Contemporary Theatre, Vol. 4: The Arab World. Trans. Maha and Tony Chehade. Ed. Don Rubin. Routledge, 2013.

== Notable works ==
- Jiza al-Khayana (The Punishment of Treachery), 1948. Muhammad al-Duqmi. Yemeni adaptation of Shakespeare’s Othello, with final scene re-written as happy ending.
- Tariq ila Mareb, 1976. Muhammad al-Sharafi.
- Al-Fa'r fii Qafas al-Itiham (The Mouse in the Dock), 1977. ‘Abd al-Kafi Muhammad Sa’id.
- Al-Jarra (The Jar), 1978. Husayn al-Asmar. Yemeni adaptation of Luigi Pirandello’s short story/comedy in Sicilian dialect, La Giara.
- Al-Mutaqaadun (The Litigants), 1978. Yemeni adaptation of Jean Racine’s only comedy, Les Plaideurs.
- Jerima fii Shari' al-Mata'im (A Crime on Restaurant Street), 2009. Wajdi al-Ahdal (author), Amin Hazaber (director).
- Ma’k Nazl (I'm Coming With You), 2009, and Kart Ahmar (Red Card), 2010, 'Aud Thaqab (Matchstick) (2011). ‘Amr Jamal.
- Wajhan li'Umla (Two Sides to a Coin), 2011. Directed by Saleh al-Saleh. A Yemeni adaptation of Alfred Farag's Ali Janah al-Tabrizi and his Servant Quffa
- Da'maamistan (2013). Muhammad al-Qa'ud (author) and Amin Hazaber (director).
