= Disability in Yemen =

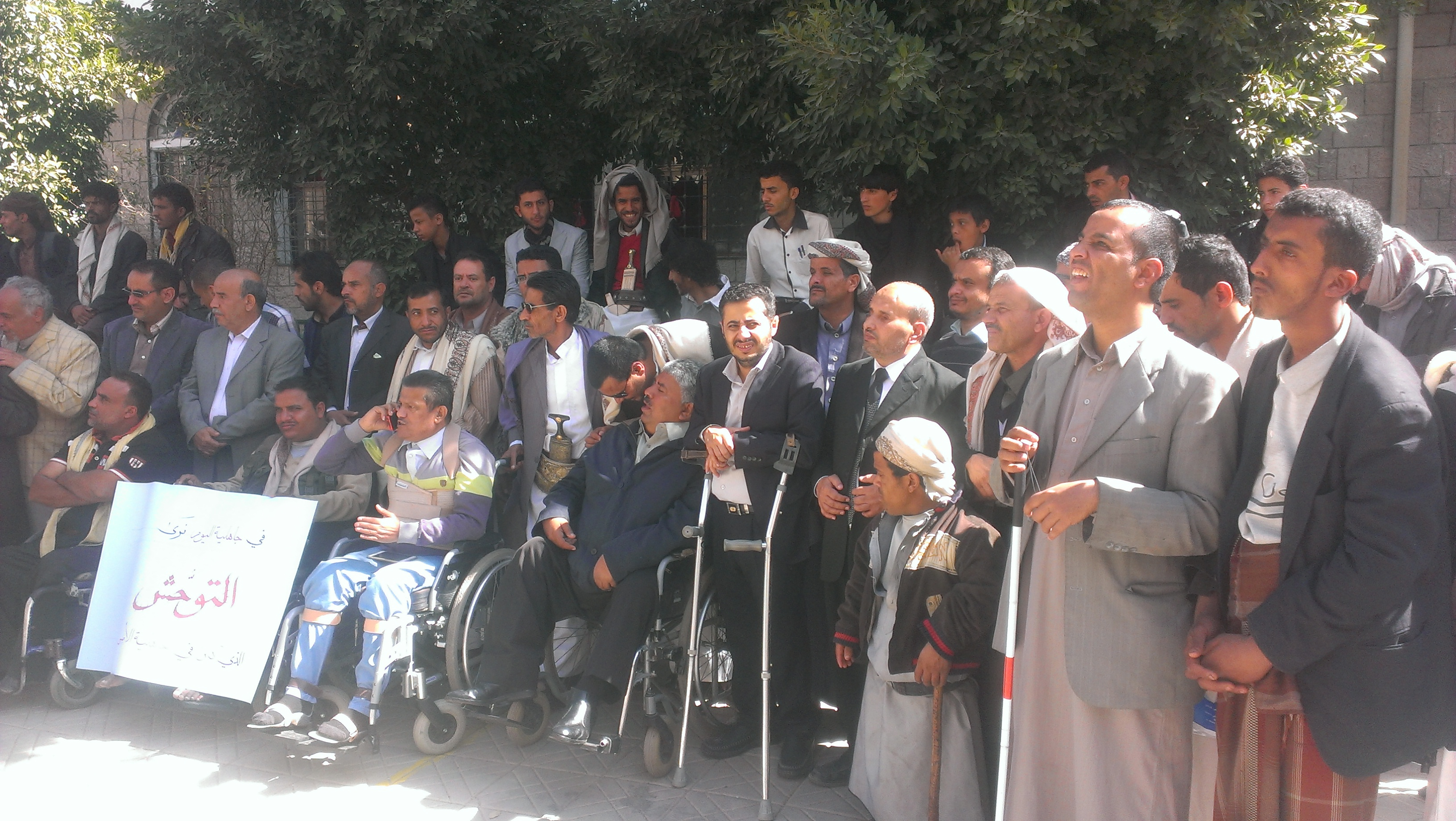
In January 2016, Human Rights Watch said nearly 6000 people had been disabled since the Saudi-led coalition began airstrikes in 2015.

Disability in Yemen has been increasing over time, especially because of increased conflict in the area. Disabled people in Yemen face many challenges due to poverty, lack of accessible infrastructure, gender segregation and more. The government of Yemen has passed laws to help protect the rights of disabled people in their country, but not all laws are equally enforced.

== Demographics ==
A 2004 estimate indicated that there were around 380,000 disabled people in Yemen. A paper produced by the United Nations (UN) in 2009 estimated the number at between 3 and 5% of the population. The Yemen government recorded around 150,000 Yemeni people with disabilities, while in 2014, the Yemeni Handicapped Forum revealed that there were more than two million people living with some type of disability in Yemen. The ongoing conflict in Yemen has added to the number of people who are disabled. There have been around 28,500 people injured in Yemen since March 2015.

The number of people in Yemen diagnosed with autism has increased over time.

Disabled individuals make up less than 1% of the workforce in the country. More individuals with disability live in rural areas of Yemen. In addition, those in the lowest income brackets are twice as likely to be disabled as people in the highest brackets as reported in 2005.

== Causes ==
In many cases disability in Yemen could be prevented. People in Yemen have disabilities related to spinal cord injuries which could be corrected with surgery. Incidents of polio still occur in Yemen, with 485 cases occurring in 2005 and 2006. Approximately 30% of disabilities in Yemen may result from congenital conditions or from complications during delivery as reported in 2003.

A study released by Ibrahim Omran ties most cases of disability to war and conflict in Yemen. Because of armed conflict in the region, thousands of Yemeni people have lost limbs since 2015. Traffic accidents, conflicts between tribes, land mines, spinal fever, genetic diseases and malnutrition are also leading causes of disability in Yemen. Marriages between close cousins also increases changes of genetic causes of disability.

== Cultural attitudes towards disability ==
The major religion of Yemen, Islam, emphasizes caring for disabled people and enduring hardship. This attitude affects the way that many Yemeni people face the challenges of disability.

Families of disabled people and those who are disabled can, however, face social stigma. Some people in Yemen believe that mothers can pass a disability to their children. Families have kept disabled people under virtual house arrest in some situations because of the shame associated with disability. Disabled women have difficulty seeing themselves getting married, although disabled men in Yemen imagined they would be able to marry almost anyone.

Individuals with disability in Yemen can be denied access to education, employment, access to healthcare and have difficulties with public spaces and transportation that are not designed to accommodate disabled people.

=== Sport ===
Yemen has participated in the Paralympic Games only once, the 1992 Summer Games in Barcelona. As of June 2017 the Yemen Paralympic Committee is suspended from the International Paralympic Committee.

== Policy ==
The government organization responsible for helping disabled individuals is the Ministry of Social Affairs and Labour (MoSAL). MoSAL also has a Disability Fund (DF). Yemen is one of the countries who has ratified the UN Convention on the Rights of Persons with Disabilities. The Social Fund for Development (SFD) is a social safety net created in 1997 which targets at-risk people in Yemen, including people with disabilities. In 2008, the SFD supported programs for 1,083 children with disabilities. The government of Yemen, in 2007, created a National Disability Strategy which "outlines the vision, objectives and principles of a 'rights-based' approach to disability for Yemen."

The Ministry of Education in Yemen has not always had enough funding to support disabled students. There are only a few schools for disabled children and these are only in Yemen's cities. Most people with disabilities in Yemen lack education and only 23.6% of those with disabilities have finished secondary school, according to a 2005 study.

=== Non-governmental organizations ===
Various non-governmental organizations (NGOs) operate in Yemen to help people with disabilities, however, many are underfunded. Organizations like Handicap International have helped by donating mobility aids and offer psychological support for people in Yemen. The Yemen Center for Autism (YCA) in Sana'a helps individuals with autism and their families. However, YCA has had trouble meeting the needs of their clients. The Altahadi Foundation, also in Sana'a, helps disabled women and girls.

=== Legislation ===
The Law for the Welfare of Disabled (Law Number 2, 2002) is considered by the UN to be the principal document pertaining to people with disability. Other laws covering disability include articles 115 - 123 of the Child Law (Number 45, 2002) and Public Law Number 61, 1999. Public Law (61/1999) guarantees that disabled people have the same rights as non-disabled people under the Constitution of Yemen. It also "allocates the responsibility for disability to the Disability Fund. Civil Service Law Number 19 in 1991 and Labor Law Number 5 in 1995 both address quotas to be met for the employment of people with disabilities. Building Code 19 of 2002 is intended to create accessible infrastructure.

Disabled people, however, have claimed that while the laws Yemen has created are good, they are rarely enforced. Wording of the laws is also often vague, making it difficult to enforce these laws on behalf of disabled people.

== Unique challenges ==
Because of ongoing conflict in Yemen, people with disabilities face problems such as lack of services and inability to access buildings. Rubble in the streets can make it difficult for those with physical disabilities to access services. Areas that have received heavy bombing have had to discontinue services to people with disabilities. In late 2015, Saudi-led coalitions bombed the Al Noor Center for Care and Rehabilitation of the Blind in Sana'a.

Human Rights Watch (HRW) states that people with disabilities are at increased risk during times of crisis and conflict. People with disabilities and their families have had difficulty leaving conflict zones. On December 3, 2016, disabled Yemenis rallied on the International Day of Persons with Disabilities, asking that the conflict in Yemen end.

Because most Yemeni people live in rural areas outside of cities, it is difficult to access services for people with disability. Due to the poverty of many disabled Yemeni people, assistive devices are too expensive to purchase. Government services meant to help disabled people in poverty must be requested in person in Sana'a and require that the applicant be literate.

=== Gender and disability ===
Disabled women in Yemen face unique challenges because of the conservative attitude towards women in the country. Disabled women in 2004 had illiteracy rates as high as 87 to 90 percent. In some cases, however, education for disabled girls was actively encouraged as an alternative opportunity.

Women in Yemen who become disabled as adults and are unable to perform their usual roles can lose their sense of self-worth.

Non-disabled women are often prevented from getting an education or marrying out of the family unit if there are disabled members of her family; she is expected to help care for the family members with disabilities.

Female teachers have rejected teaching disabled men because of the stratification of Yemeni society where men and women do not normally interact with one another.

== Notable activists ==
- Fatima al-Aqel, activist for individuals with blindness Al-Aman Organization Blind Women Care (AOBWC)
- Jamala al-Baidhani, activist for the civil rights of disabled people, Al-Tahadi Association for Disabled Females
