= National anthem of Yemen =

al-Jumhūriyah al-Muttaḥidah
English: "United Republic"
- Arabic: الجمهورية المتحدة
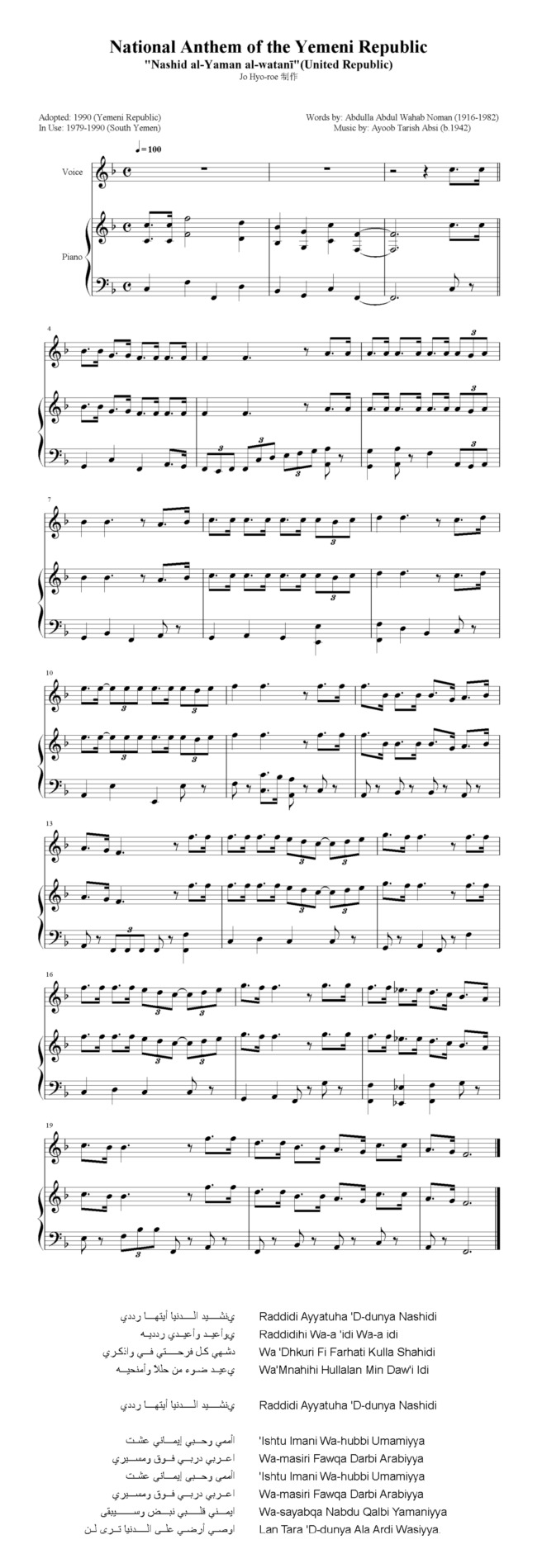
- National anthem of Yemen Former national anthem of South Yemen
- Also known as: Arabic: رددي أيتها الدنيا نشيدي (English: "Repeat, O World, My Song")
- Lyrics: Abdollah Abdolwahâb Noʿmân, 1979
- Music: ʾAyub Ṭâreš, ext. 1979
- Adopted: 1979 (by South Yemen); 22 May 1990 (by Yemen)
- Relinquished: 1990 (by South Yemen)
- Preceded by: National Anthem of the People's Democratic Republic of Yemen (of South Yemen); A Nation's Will (of North Yemen)

Audio sample
- Vocal recording: file; help

Original pre-2006 version of the anthem. It is still used rarely.

"United Republic", (Note: Arabic: الجمهورية المتحدة, romanized: al-Jumhūriyah al-Muttaḥidah) also known by its incipit "Repeat, O World, My Song", (Note: Arabic: رددي أيتها الدنيا نشيدي, romanized: Raddidī ʾayatuhā d-dunyā nashīdī) is the national anthem of Yemen. It was written by ʿAbdullāh ʿAbd al-Wahhāb Nuʿmān to music composed by ʾAyyūb Ṭārish. It was formerly used as the national anthem of South Yemen and was adopted by Yemen when the country was unified in 1990.

During its usage by South Yemen from 1979 to 1990, the anthem was used without a title.

== Lyrics ==
=== Official lyrics since 2006 ===
Arabic original

:جوقة
رَدِّدِي أَيَّتُهَا الدُّنْيَا نَشِيدِي
رَدِّدِيهِ وَأَعِيدِي وَأَعِيدِي
وَاذْكُرِي فِي فَرْحَتِي كُلَّ شَهِيدِ
وَامْنَحِيهِ حُلَلًا مِنْ ضَوْءِ عِيدِي
𝄇 رَدِّدِي أَيَّتُهَا الدُّنْيَا نَشِيدِي 𝄆

وَحْدَتِي، وَحْدَتِي
يَا نَشِيدًا رَائِعًا يَمْلَأُ نَفْسِي
أَنْتِ عَهْدٌ عَالِقٌ فِي كُلِّ ذِمَّة
رَايَتِي، رَايَتِي
يَا نَسِيجًا حِكْتُهُ مِنْ كُلِّ شَمْسِ
أُخْلُدِي خَافِقَةً فِي كُلِّ قِمَّة
أُمَّتِي، أُمَّتِي
اِمْنَحِينِي الْبَأْسَ يَامَصْدَرَ بَأْسِي
وَاذْخُرِينِي لَكِ يَا أَكْرَمَ أُمَّة

عِشْتُ إِيمَانِي وَحُبِّي أُمَمِيَّا
وَمَسِيرِي فَوْقَ دَرْبِي عَرَبِيَّا
وَسَيَبْقَى نَبْضُ قَلْبِي يَمَنِيَّا
لَنْ تَرَى الدُّنْيَا عَلَى أَرْضِي وَصِيَّا

Arabic Latin alphabet

Jawqa:
Raddidī ʾayatuhā d-dunyā nashīdī
Raddidīhi wa-ʾaʿīdī, wa-ʾaʿīdī
Wā-dhkurī fī-farḥatī kulla shahīdi
Wā-mnaḥīhi ḥullalān min ḍawʿi ʿīdī
𝄆 Raddidī ʾayatuhā d-dunyā nashīdi 𝄇

Waḥdatī, waḥdatī,
Yā nashīdān rāʾiʿan yamlau nafsī
ʾAnti ʿahdun ʿaliqun fī-kulli dhimmah
Rāyatī, rāyatī,
Yā nasījān ḥiktahu min kulli shamsi
ʾUkhludī khāfiqatan fī-kulli qimmah
ʾUmmatī, ʾummatī,
ʾImnaḥīni l-bạsa yā maṣdari bạsī
Wa-ʾadhkhurīni laki yā ʾakrama ʾummah

ʿIshtu ʾīmānī wa-ḥubbī ʾumamiyā (Note: Often sung as أُمَمِيَّا omamiyâ [u.mæ.mi.jæ].)
Wa-masīrī fawqa darbī ʿArabiyā
Wa-sayabqā nabḍu qalbī yamaniyā
Lan tarā d-dunyā ʿalā ʾarḍī waṣiyā.

IPA transcription (Note: See Help:IPA/Arabic and Yemeni Arabic.)

[ʄɑw.qɑ]
[ræd.dɪ.di ʔæ.jæ.tʊ.hæː‿d.dʊn.jæː næ.ʃiː.diː]
[ræd.dɪ.di.hɪ wɑ.ʔɑ.ʕɪː.diː wɑ.ʔɑ.ʕɪː.diː]
[wɑːð.kʊ.ri fiː fɑr.ħɑ.ti kʊl.læ ʃæ.hiː.di]
[wɑːm.nɑ.ħɪ.hi ħʊ.læ.læːn mɪn dˤɑw.ʕɪ ʕɪː.diː]
𝄆 [ræd.dɪ.di ʔæ.jæ.tʊ.hæː‿d.dʊn.jæː næ.ʃiː.diː] 𝄇

[wɑħ.dæ.ti wɑħ.dæ.ti]
[jæː næ.ʃiː.dæn rɑ̯ː.ʔɪ.ʕɑn jæm.læ.ʔʊ næf.si]
[æn.tɪ ʕɑh.dʊn ʕɑ.lɪ.qʊn fiː kʊl.lɪ ðɪm.mæ]
[rɑː.jæ.ti rɑː.jæ.ti]
[jæː næ.si.ʄæn ħɪk.tʊ.hu mɪn kʊl.lɪ ʃæm.si]
[ʊχ.lʊ.di χɑ.fɪ.qɑ.tæn fiː kʊl.lɪ qɪm.mæ]
[ʊm.mæ.ti ʊm.mæ.ti]
[ɪm.nɑ.ħɪ.nɪ‿l.bæʔ.sæ jæː mɑsˤ.dɑ.rɪ bæʔ.si]
[wɑð.χʊ.rɪ.ni læ.ki jæː æk.rɑ.mæ ʊm.mɑ]

[ʕɪʃ.tʊ i.mæː.ni wɑ.ħʊb.bi u.mæ.mi.jæ]
[wɑ mæ.sɪ.ri fɑw.qɑ dɑr.bi ʕɑ.rɑ.bi.jæ]
[wɑ sæ.jæb.qɑː nɑb.dˤʊ qɑl.bi jæ.mæ.ni.jæ]
[læn tɑ.rɑː‿d.dʊn.jæː ʕɑ.læ ɑr.dˤɪ wɑ.sˤɪ.jæ]

English translation

Chorus:
Repeat, O World, my song.
Echo it over and over again.
Remember, through my joy, each martyr.
Clothe her with the shining mantles of our festivals.
𝄆 Repeat, O World, my song. 𝄇

My unity, my unity
O marvelous song which fills my heart,
You are the promise of all to come,
My banner, my banner
O cloth nailed from every sun
Raised forever, on every peak
My nation, my nation
give me strength, o source of strength
And save me for you, the best of nations.

In faith and love I am part of mankind,
And I shall march first among the Arabs.
And my heart beat shall remain that of a Yemenite.
No foreigner shall ever hold dominion over my land.

=== Previous version from 1979 to 2006 ===
Arabic original

:جوقة
رددي أيتها الدنيا نشيدي
ردديه وأعيدي وأعيدي
واذكري في فرحتي كل شهيد
وأمنحيه حللاً من ضوء عيدي
𝄇 رددي أيتها الدنيا نشيدي 𝄆

١
يَـا بِلَادِي … نَحْنُ أَبْنَـاءُ وَأَحْفَادُ رِجَالِكْ
سَوْفَ نَحْمِي … كُلَّ مَا بَيْنَ يَدَيْنَا مِنْ جَلَالِـكْ
وَسَيَبْقَىٰ … خَالِدُ الضَّوْءِ عَلَىٰ كُلِّ الْمَسَالِكْ
كُلُّ صَخْرِة … فِي جِبَالِكْ
كُلُّ ذَرَّة … فِي رِمَالِكْ
كُـلُّ أَنْدَاء … فِي ضِـلَالِـكْ

مِـلْـكُنَا
إِنَّـهَا مِلْكُ أَمَـانِينَا الْـكَبِيرَة
حَقُّنَا
جَاءَ مِنْ أَمْجَادِ مَاضِيكِ الْمُثِيرَة

𝄇 رددي أيتها الدنيا نشيدي 𝄆

٢
وحدتي … وحدتي
يا نشيدا رائـعًا يملأ نـفسي … أنتِ عـهد عالق في كل ذمة
رايتي … رايتي
يا نسيجًا حكته من كل شـمس … اخـلدي خافقة في كل قمة
أمتي … أمتي
امنحيني البأس يا مصدر بأسي … واذخريني لك يا أكرم أمة

𝄇 عشت إيماني وحبي سَرْمَدِيَّا
ومسيري فوق دربي عربيا 𝄆
وسيبقى نبـض قلبي يمنيا
لن ترى الدنيا على أرضي وصيا

جوقة

Arabic Latin alphabet

Jawqa:
Raddidī ʾayatuhā d-dunyā nashīdī
Raddidīhi wa-ʾaʿīdī, wa-ʾaʿīdī
Wā-dhkurī fī-farḥatī kulla shahīdi
Wā-mnaḥīhi ḥullalān min ḍawʿi ʿīdī
𝄆 Raddidī ʾayatuhā d-dunyā nashīdi 𝄇

I
Yā Bilādī, naḥnu ʾabnāʾu wa-ʾaḥfādu rijālik
Sawfa naḥmī, kulla mā bayna yadayna min jalālik
Wa-sayabqā, khālida ḍ-ḍawʾi ʿalā kulli l-masālik
Kullu ṣakhri, fī-jibālik,
Kulli dharrati, fī-rimālik.
Kullu ʾandāʾ, fī-ḍilālik,

Milkuna
ʾInnahā milku ʾamānīnā l-kabīra,
Ḥaqqunā
Jāʾa min ʾamjādi māḍīki l-muthīra.

𝄆 Raddidī ʾayatuhā d-dunyā nashīdi 𝄇

II
Waḥdatī, waḥdatī, yā nashīdān rāʾiʿan yamlau nafsī
ʾAnti ʿahdun ʿaliqun fī-kulli dhimmah
Rāyatī, rāyatī, yā nasījān ḥiktahu min kulli shamsi
ʾUkhludī khāfiqatan fī-kulli qimmah
ʾUmmatī, ʾummatī, ʾimnaḥīni l-bạsa yā maṣdari bạsī
Wā-dhkhurīni laki yā ʾakrama ʾummah

𝄆 ʿIshtu ʾīmānī wa-ḥubbī sarmadiyā
Wa-masīrī fawqa darbī ʿArabiyā 𝄇
Wa-sayabqā nabḍu qalbī yamaniyā
Lan tarā d-dunyā ʿalā ʾarḍī waṣiyā.

Jawqa

English translation

Chorus:
Repeat, O World, my song.
Echo it over and over again.
Remember, through my joy, each martyr.
Clothe her with the shining mantles of our festivals.
𝄆 Repeat, O World, my song. 𝄇

I
O my country, we are children and grandchildren of your men.
We will guard all of your majesty in our hands.
Its light will remain forever in every place.
Every rock of your mountains,
Every particle of your soil.
All the moisture of your waters

Are ours.
It is the sovereign of our hopes,
Our rights.
They come from the great glories of your past.

𝄆 Repeat, O World, my song. 𝄇

II
My unity, my unity
O marvelous song which fills my heart, you are the promise of all to come,
My banner, my banner
O cloth nailed from every sun raised forever, on every peak
My nation, my nation
Give me strength, o source of strength, and save me for you, the best of nations.

𝄆 In faith and love I am immortal,
And I shall march first among the Arabs. 𝄇
And my heart beat shall remain that of a Yemenite.
No foreigner shall ever hold dominion over my land.

Chorus

== See also ==
- National symbols of Yemen
