= Ayoob Tarish =

Yemeni singer-songwriter (born 1942)

ʾAyyūb Ṭārish ʿAbsī
- Born: أيوب طارش بن نائف بن ناجي العبسي; 1942 (age 83–84); Taʿizz, Yemen
- Occupations: Singer, poet
- Notable work: National anthem of Yemen

Ayoob Tarish resp. Ayub Ṭâreš (Arabic: أيوب طارش عبسي,ʾAyyūb Ṭārish ʿAbsī, born 1942) is a Yemeni singer-songwriter, best known for composing the national anthem of Yemen, which was adopted following the Yemenite reunification.
