= Abdullah Noman =

Yemeni poet and politician (1917–1982)

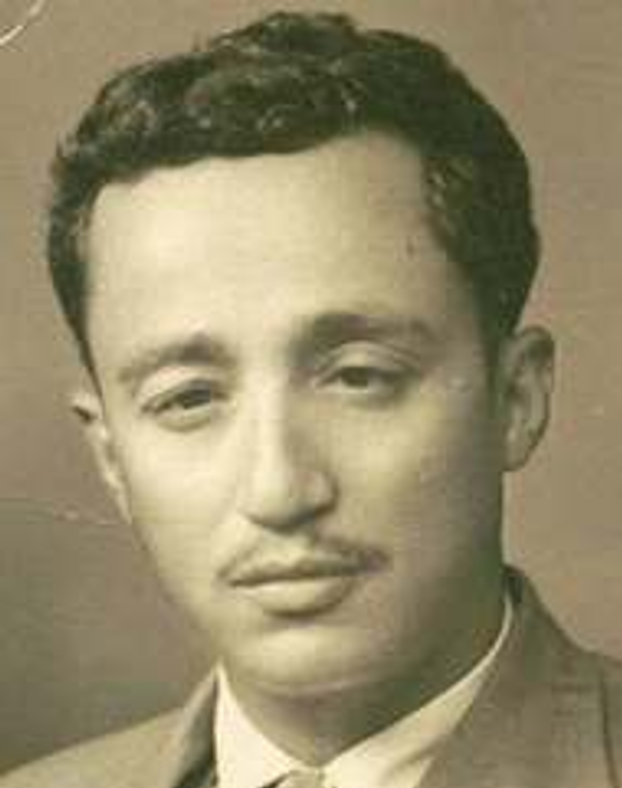
- Portrait of Abdullah Noman
- Born: 1917; Turbah Dhubhan, Ottoman Yemen
- Died: 5 July 1982 (aged 64–65); Ta'izz, North Yemen
- Occupations: Poet and politician
- Notable work: National anthem of Yemen
- Title: Al-Fadhool

Abdullah Abdulwahab Noman (1917 – 5 July 1982) was a Yemeni poet and politician. He is the author of the Yemeni national anthem and was one of the founders of the Free Yemeni Party.

== Biography ==
Abdullah Noman was born in 1917 in Turbah Dhubhan, in southwestern Yemen. His father, Abdulwahab Noman, was the mayor of Al-Hajaria appointed by the Ottoman Empire and was executed after his participation in the 1948 revolution against Imam Yahya Hamid al-Din, following an imprisonment of about 25 years. His cousin is the late Prime Minister Mohammed Ahmed Noman and one of the pioneers of the national movement.

He received his education from his father in Al-Hajaria and his place of detention in Sana'a, and then from the scholar Abdullah Al-Muazbi in Zabid.

He worked as a teacher at the Ahmadiyya School in Ta'izz from 1941 to 1944. He left his province after being warned of an imminent arrest order from Ahmed bin Yahya Hamid al-Din, and he fled south to Aden which was then a British protectorate. Noman worked as a teacher in the Ba Zar'a School in Aden and contributed to the establishment of the Free Party. He also published the newspaper "Sawt al-Yemen" ("Voice of Yemen"), which opposed the Imamate rule in the north. He wrote hot political articles in other Aden newspapers, such as "Fatah al-Jazira," under the pseudonym "Yemeni without Shelter."

One of the most important milestones in his life was the establishment of the newspaper "Al-Fadool". He edited articles under the pen name "Bisbas" on the al-Kifah newspaper. Noman returned to North Yemen after the September 1962 revolution that overthrew the theocratic monarchy, but was later imprisoned in the Rad'a Prison from 1966 to 1967 by order of the Egyptian Army for his opposition to the Egyptian intervention in the North Yemen Civil War. He held several positions in the republican government, including Minister of Information and Unity Affairs.
