= A Nation's Will =

National anthem of North Yemen from 1978 to 1990

ʾIrādāt ʾumma
English: A Nation's Will
- إرادة أمة
- National anthem of the Yemen Arab Republic
- Lyrics: Ahmed al-Amari
- Music: Ali al-Ansi
- Adopted: 18 July 1978; 48 years ago
- Relinquished: 22 May 1990; 36 years ago (Unification of Yemen)
- Preceded by: "Peace to the Land"
- Succeeded by: "United Republic"

Audio sample
- Instrumental recording of the anthem: file; help

"A Nation's Will" (Arabic: إرادة أمة ʾIrādāt ʾumma) was the national anthem of the Yemen Arab Republic from 1978 to 1990. The anthem was introduced to replace the old national anthem "Peace to the Land". It was eventually replaced by "United Republic", following the Yemeni unification.

== Lyrics ==
Arabic original

:كورال
𝄆 في ظل راية ثورتي
أعلنت جمهوريتي 𝄇
يمني السعيدة منيتي
إني وهبتك مهجتي
بعزيمتي بإرادتي
أنهيت عهد الظلمة
وبقوتي وبوحدتي
حققت حلم الأمة
ومضيت نحو القمة
والله بارك وثبتي

١
𝄆 هيهات شعبي يستكين
شعبي محا ظلم السنين 𝄇
وأباد كل الظالمين
𝄆 ليعيش مرفوع الجبين 𝄇

كورال

٢
𝄆 وطني وصوتك في فمي
يعلو وحبك في دمي 𝄇
لا لن تعود لتنتمي
𝄆 أبدا لعصر المجرمين 𝄇

كورال

٣
𝄆 هتافنا عبر الزمن
لبيك يا أرض اليمن 𝄇
لبيك يا أغلى وطن
𝄆 نفديك من كل المحن 𝄇

كورال

٤
𝄆 في ثورتي حريتي
والحكم حكم الأمة 𝄇
هذي إرادة أمتي
𝄆 أشدو بها في فرحتي 𝄇

كورال

٥
𝄆 قسماً برب العزة
قسماً بمجد عروبتي 𝄇
أني سأحمي ثورتي
𝄆 وأصون جمهوريتي 𝄇

كورال

Romanization of Arabic

Kūrāl:
𝄆 Fī ẓill rāyah thawratī
ʾAuʿlanit jumhūrīyatī 𝄇
Yamanī s-sʿīdati munīyatī
ʾInī wahabtak muhjatī
Baʿzīmatī bi-ʾrādatī
ʾAnhīt ʾahd aẓ-ẓulmati
Wa-b-qūwatī wa-b-waḥdatī
Ḥaqqaqat ḥulm al-ʾamati
Wa-maḍayt naḥw-al-qimmati
Wallāh bārak wathbatī

1
𝄆 Hayhāta shaʿbī yastakīn
Shaʿbī maḥā zulm as-sinīn 𝄇
Wa-ʾabāda kull aẓ-ẓālimīn
𝄆 Liyaʿasha marfūʿ al-jabīn 𝄇

Kūrāl

2
𝄆 Waṭanī waṣūtuk fī famiyī
Yaʿlū waḥabaka fī damiyī 𝄇
La lan taʿawwud litantamī
𝄆 ʾAbadan laʿaṣr al-mujrimīn 𝄇

Kūrāl

3
𝄆 Hutāfunā ʿabra z-zaman
Labbayka yā ʾarḍ al-yaman 𝄇
Labbayka yā ʾagllā waṭan
𝄆 Nafidīk min kulli l-miḥan 𝄇

Kūrāl

4
𝄆 Fī thawratī ḥuriyatī
Wa-l-ḥukm ḥukm al-ʾummati 𝄇
Hadhī ʾirādah ʾummati
𝄆 Shidū bihā fī farḥatī 𝄇

Kūrāl

5
𝄆 Qassaman birab al-ʿizzati
Qassaman bimajd ʿurūbatī 𝄇
ʾAnnī saʾaḥmī thawratī
𝄆 Wa-ʾaṣūna jumhūriyatī 𝄇

Kūrāl

English translation

Chorus:
𝄆 Under the auspices of the banner of my revolution
I have declared my republic 𝄇
My happy Yemen is my aspiration
I have sacrificed for you my life
With my will and determination
I have terminated the era of darkness
And with strength and my unity
I have achieved the dream of my people
And marched towards the summit
And Allah blessed my awakening

1
𝄆 My people shall never be submissive
My people have erased the injustice of the years 𝄇
And finished all the ants
𝄆 In order to live with pride 𝄇

Chorus

2
𝄆 My homeland and your voice in my mouth
Is sweetened and your love in my blood 𝄇
No never will you return to be
𝄆 Under an era of darkness 𝄇

Chorus

3
𝄆 Our shouts through the time
Here we are oh land of Yemen 𝄇
Here we are oh the precious country
𝄆 We shall protect you from all the ordeals 𝄇

Chorus

4
𝄆 In my revolution is my freedom
And the rule is the rule of the people 𝄇
This is my the will of my people
𝄆 I sing it with pride 𝄇

Chorus

5
𝄆 I swear by the Almighty Allah
I swear with the honour of my Arabism 𝄇
That I will protect my revolution
𝄆 And will preserve my Republic 𝄇

Chorus
