= Eikev =

Portion of the Torah

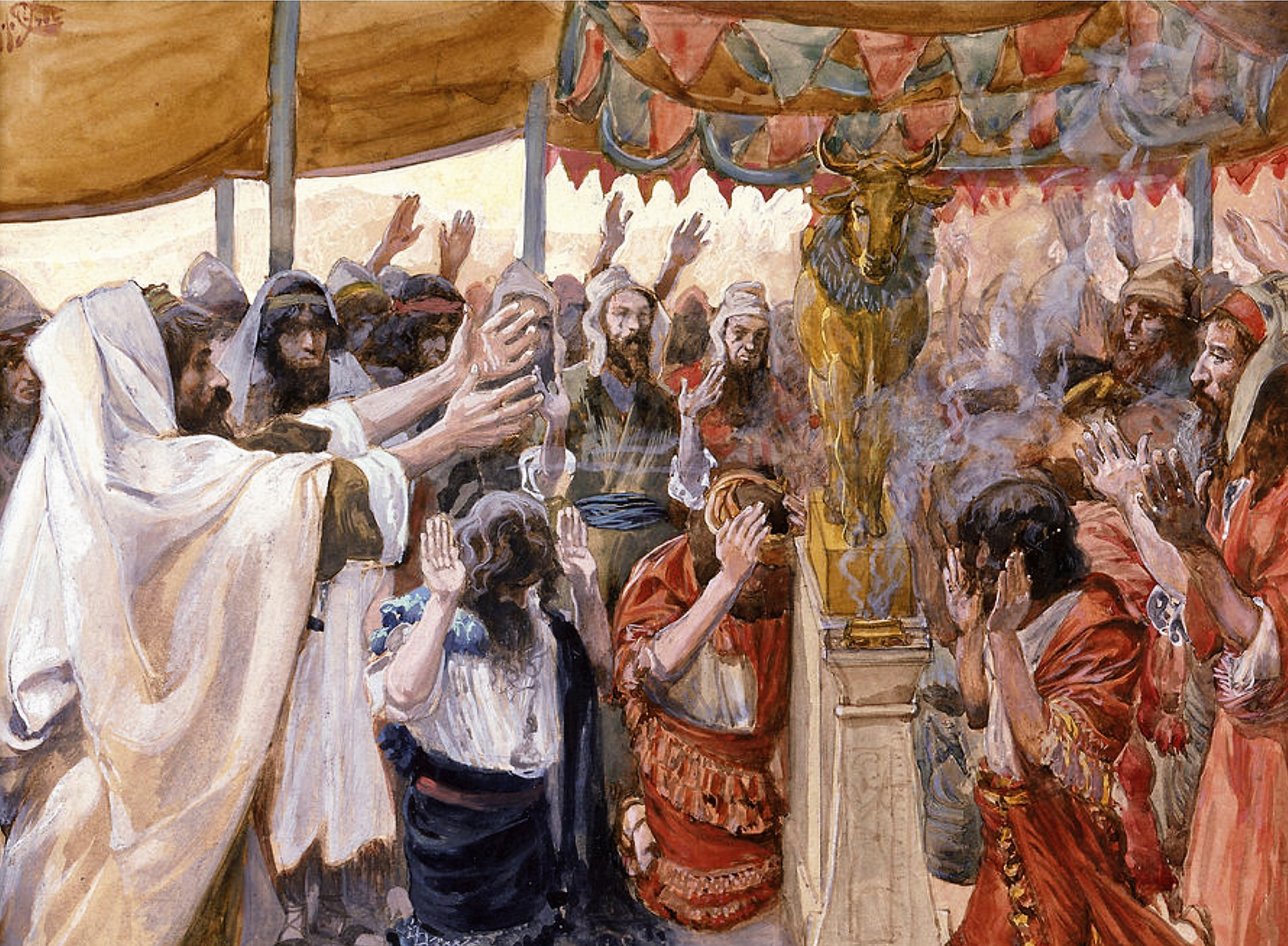
The Golden Calf (watercolor circa 1896–1902 by James Tissot)

Eikev, Ekev, Ekeb, Aikev, or ʿEqeb (Hebrew: עֵקֶב—"if [you follow]," the second word, and the first distinctive word in the parashah) is the 46th weekly Torah portion (פָּרָשָׁה, parashah) in the annual Jewish cycle of Torah reading and the third in the Book of Deuteronomy. It comprises Deuteronomy 7:12–11:25. The parashah tells of the blessings of obedience to God, the dangers of forgetting God, and directions for taking the Land of Israel. Moses recalls the making and re-making of the Tablets of Stone, the incident of the Golden Calf, Aaron's death, the Levites' duties, and exhortations to serve God.

The parashah is made up of 6865 Hebrew letters, 1747 Hebrew words, 111 verses, and 232 lines in a Torah Scroll (סֵפֶר תּוֹרָה, Sefer Torah). Jews generally read it in August or, on rare occasions, late July.

== Readings ==
In traditional Shabbat Torah reading, the parashah is divided into seven readings or עליות, aliyot. In the Hebrew Bible, Parashat Eikev has six "open portion" (פתוחה, petuchah) divisions (roughly equivalent to paragraphs, often abbreviated with the Hebrew letter פ [peh]). Parashat Eikev has several further subdivisions, called "closed portions" (סתומה, setumah) (abbreviated with the Hebrew letter ס [samekh]) within the open portion divisions. The first open portion divides the first reading. The second open portion goes from the middle of the first reading to the middle of the second reading. The short third open portion is contained within the second reading. The fourth open portion starts in the second reading and contains all of the third reading. The fifth open portion corresponds to the fourth reading, and the sixth open portion spans the fifth, sixth, and seventh readings. A closed portion corresponds to the fifth reading. The sixth reading is divided into two closed portion divisions, and the short seventh reading corresponds to a final closed portion.

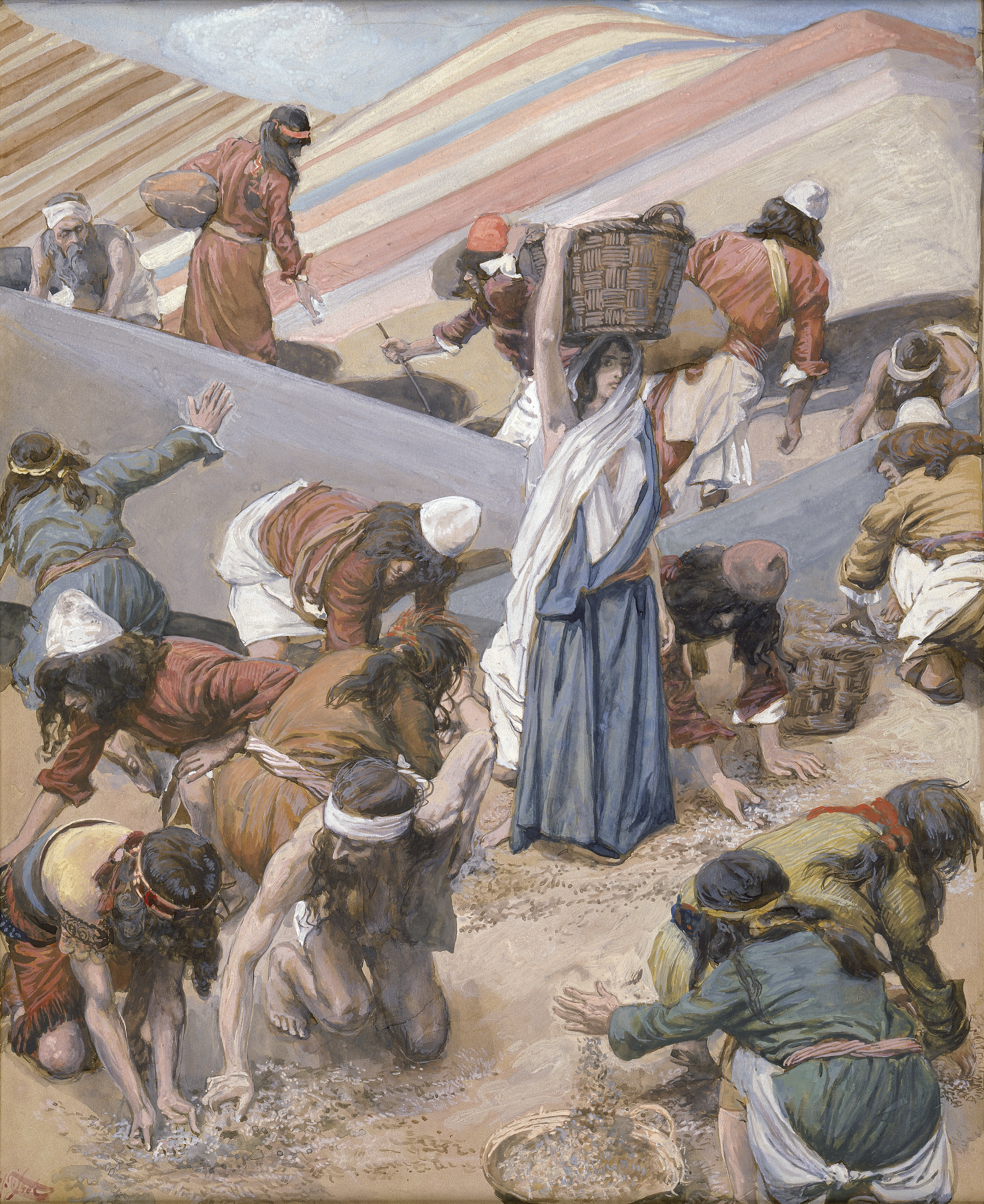
The Gathering of the Manna (watercolor circa 1896–1902 by James Tissot)

=== First reading—Deuteronomy 7:12–8:10 ===
In the first reading, Moses told the Israelites that if they obeyed God's rules, God would faithfully maintain the covenant, bless them with fertility and agricultural productivity, and ward off sickness. Moses directed the Israelites to destroy all the peoples whom God delivered to them showing no pity and without worshiping their gods. A closed portion ends here.

Moses told the Israelites not to fear these nations because they were numerous, for the Israelites had but to recall what God did to Pharaoh and the Egyptians and the wonders by which God liberated them. God would do the same to the peoples whom they feared, and would send a plague against them, too. God would dislodge those peoples little by little, so that the wild beasts would not take over the land. Moses directed the Israelites to burn the images of their gods, not to covet nor keep the silver and gold on them, nor to bring an abhorrent thing into their houses. The first open portion ends here.

God made the Israelites travel the long way in the wilderness for an additional thirty-eight years (for a total of 40 years) because of their sin of unbelief and their rebellion after the twelve spies returned from reconnoitering Canaan, of whom ten gave a negative report about Israel's ability to take the land. God determined that none of that generation would enter the land which He had promised and so they remained in the wilderness until all that generation died. God subjected them to hunger and then gave them manna to teach them that man does not live on bread alone, but on what God decrees. Their clothes did not wear out, nor did their feet swell for 40 years. God disciplined them as a man disciplines his son. Moses told the Israelites that God was bringing them into a good land, where they might eat food without end, and thus when they had eaten their fill, they were to give thanks to God for the good land that God had given them. The first reading ends here.

=== Second reading—Deuteronomy 8:11–9:3 ===
In the second reading, Moses warned the Israelites not to forget God, not to violate God's commandments, and not to grow haughty and believe that their own power had won their wealth, but to remember that God gave them the power to prosper. The second open portion ends here.

Moses warned that if they forgot God and followed other gods, then they would certainly perish like the nations that God was going to displace from the land. The third open portion ends here with the end of chapter 8.

Moses warned the Israelites that they were to dispossess nations greater than they, but God would go before them as a devouring fire to drive out the land's inhabitants. The second reading ends here.

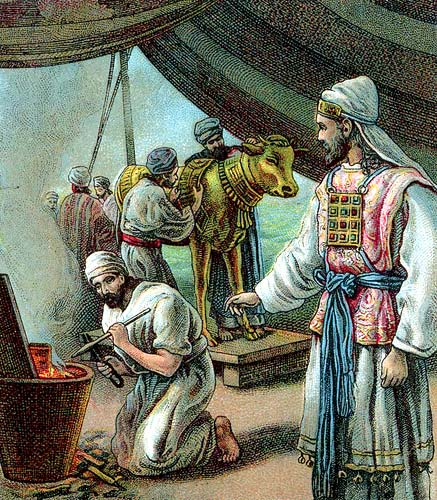
The Golden Calf (illustration from a Bible card published 1907 by the Providence Lithograph Company)

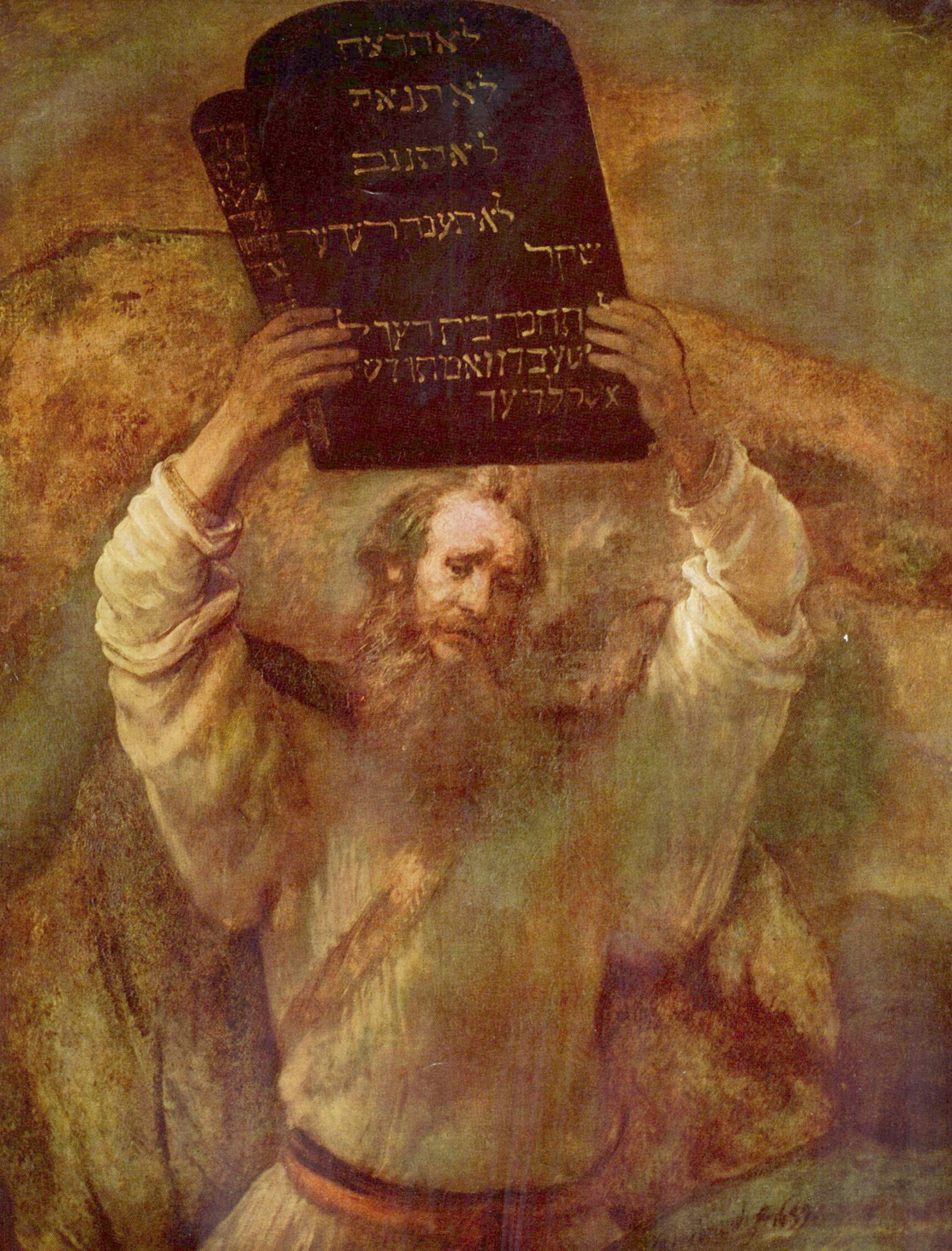
Moses with the Tablets of the Law (1659 painting by Rembrandt)

=== Third reading—Deuteronomy 9:4–29 ===
In the third reading, Moses warned the Israelites not to believe that God had enabled them to possess the land because of their own virtue; God was dispossessing the land's current inhabitants for two reasons: because of those nations' wickedness, and to fulfill the oath that God had made to Abraham, Isaac, and Jacob. Moses exhorted the Israelites to remember how they had provoked God to anger in the wilderness. At Horeb they so provoked God that God was angry enough to have destroyed them. Moses ascended the mountain, stayed for 40 days and nights, and consumed no bread or water. At the end of the 40 days, God gave Moses two stone tablets that God had inscribed with the covenant that God had addressed to the Israelites. God told Moses to hurry down, for the people whom Moses brought out of Egypt had acted wickedly and had made a molten image. God told Moses that God was inclined to destroy them and make of Moses a nation far more numerous than they. Moses started down the mountain with the two tablets in his hands, when he saw how the Israelites had made themselves a molten calf. Moses smashed the two tablets before their eyes, and threw himself down before God, fasting another 40 days and nights. God gave heed to Moses. God was angry enough with Aaron to have destroyed him, so Moses also interceded for Aaron. Moses burned the calf, ground it into dust, and threw its dust into the brook that came down from the mountain.

In the continuation of the reading, Moses reminded the Israelites how they provoked God at Taberah, at Massah, and at Kibroth-hattaavah. And when God sent them from Kadesh-barnea to take possession of the land, they flouted God's command and did not put their trust in God. When Moses lay prostrate before God those 40 days, because God was determined to destroy the Israelites, Moses prayed to God not to annihilate God's own people, whom God freed from Egypt, but to give thought to Abraham, Isaac, and Jacob and ignore the Israelites' sinfulness, else the Egyptians would say that God was powerless to bring them into the land that God had promised them. The third reading and the fourth open portion end here with the end of chapter 9.

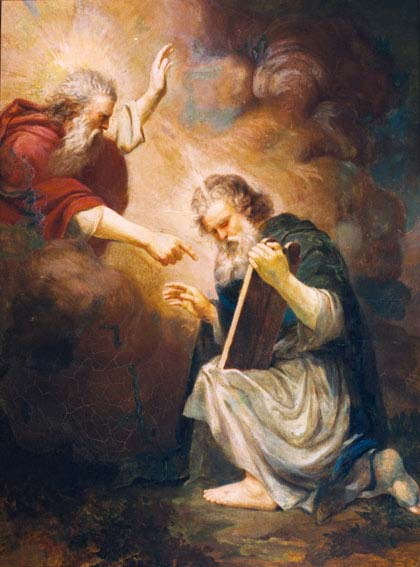
Moses Receiving the Tablets of the Law (1868 painting by João Zeferino da Costa)

=== Fourth reading—Deuteronomy 10:1–11 ===
In the fourth reading, God told Moses to carve out two tablets of stone like the first, come up the mountain, and make an ark of wood. God inscribed on the tablets the Ten Commandments that were on the first tablets that Moses had smashed, and Moses came down from the mountain and deposited the tablets in the Ark.

In the continuation of the reading, the Israelites marched to Moserah, where Aaron died and was buried, and his son Eleazar became priest in his stead. From there they marched to Gudgod, and on to Jotbath. God set apart the Levites to carry the Ark of the Covenant, to stand in attendance upon the Tabernacle, and to bless in God's Name, and that was why the Levites were to receive no portion of the land, as God was their portion. The fourth reading and the fifth open portion end with Deuteronomy 10:11.

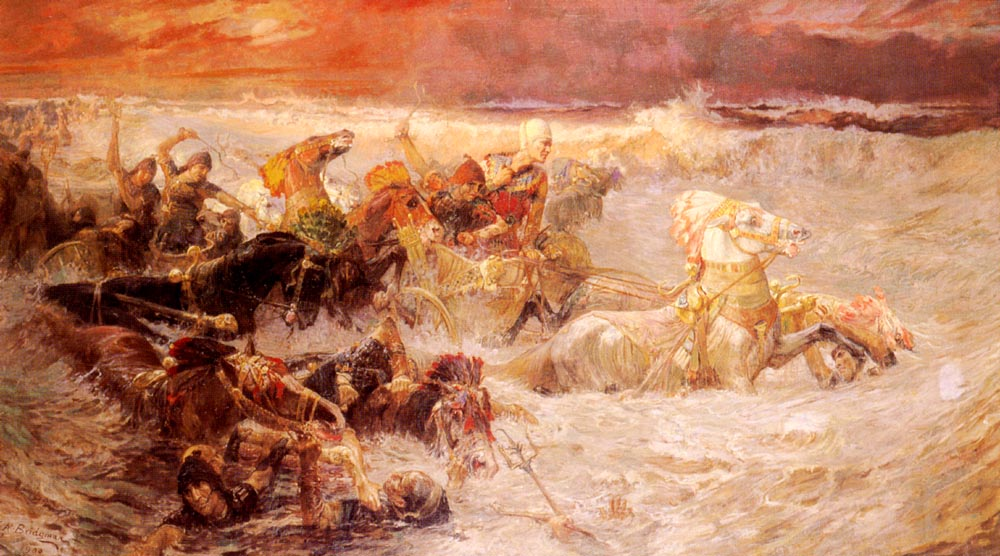
Pharaoh's Army Engulfed by the Red Sea (1900 painting by Frederick Arthur Bridgman)

=== Fifth reading—Deuteronomy 10:12–11:9 ===
In the fifth reading, Moses exhorted the Israelites to revere God, to walk only in God's paths, to love God, to serve God with all their heart and soul, and to keep God's commandments. Moses noted that although heaven and earth belong to God, God was drawn to love their fathers, so that God chose the Israelites from among all peoples. Moses described God as supreme, great, mighty, and awesome, showing no favor and taking no bribe, but upholding the cause of the fatherless and the widow, and befriending the stranger. Moses thus instructed the Israelites to befriend the stranger, for they were strangers in Egypt. Moses exhorted the Israelites to revere God, worship only God, and swear only by God's name, for God was their glory, who performed for them marvelous deeds, and made them as numerous as the stars. Moses exhorted the Israelites to love God and always keep God's commandments. Moses asked the Israelites to note that they themselves witnessed the signs that God performed in Egypt against Pharaoh, what God did to Egypt's army, how God rolled upon them the waters of the Sea of Reeds, what God did for them in the wilderness, and what God did to Dathan and Abiram when the earth swallowed them. Moses instructed them therefore to keep all the law so that they might have the strength to enter and possess the land and long endure on that land flowing with milk and honey. The fifth reading and a closed portion end here.

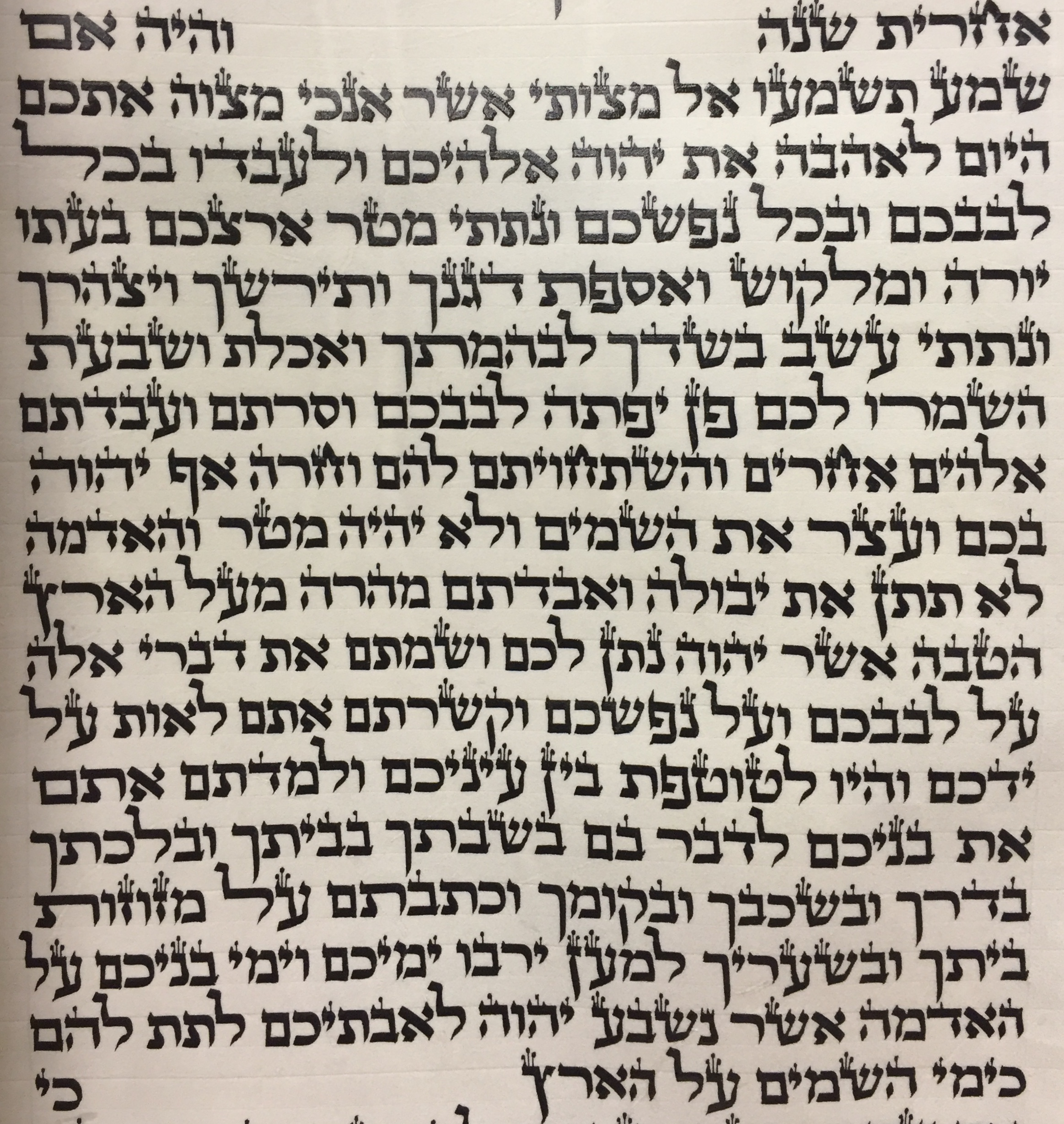
The second paragraph of the Shema

=== Sixth reading—Deuteronomy 11:10–21 ===
In the sixth reading, Moses extolled the promised land as a land of hills and valleys that soaks up its water from the rains, a land that God looks after. He contrasted this with Egypt, which was dependent on irrigation. A closed portion ends here.

Then Moses told them words now found in the Shema prayer: If the Israelites obeyed the commandments, loving God and serving God with heart and soul, God would grant the rain in season and they would gather their grain, wine, and oil. God would provide grass for their cattle and the Israelites would eat their fill. Moses warned them not to be lured away to serve other gods, for God's anger would flare up against them, God would suspend the rain, and they would soon perish from the land. Moses urged them to impress God's words upon their heart, bind them as a sign on their hands, let them serve as a symbol on their foreheads, teach them to their children, and recite them when they stayed at home and when they were away, when they lay down and when they got up. Moses instructed them to inscribe God's words on the doorposts of their houses and on their gates, so that they and their children might endure in the land that God swore to their fathers as long as there is a heaven over the earth. The sixth reading and a closed portion end here.

=== Seventh reading—Deuteronomy 11:22–25 ===
In the seventh reading, which is also the concluding maftir (מפטיר) reading, Moses promised that if the Israelites faithfully kept the law, loving God, walking in all God's ways, and holding fast to God, then God would dislodge the nations then in the land, and every spot on which their feet tread would be theirs, and their territory would extend from the wilderness to Lebanon and from the Euphrates to the Mediterranean Sea. Parashat Eikev and a closed portion end here.

=== Readings according to the triennial cycle ===
Jews who read the Torah according to the triennial cycle of Torah reading read the parashah according to the following schedule:

	Year 1	Year 2	Year 3
	2026, 2029, 2032 . . .	2027, 2030, 2033 . . .	2028, 2031, 2034 . . .
Reading	7:12–9:3	9:4–10:11	10:12–11:25
1	7:12–16	9:4–10	10:12–15
2	7:17–21	9:11–14	10:16–22
3	7:22–26	9:15–21	11:1–9
4	8:1–3	9:22–29	11:10–12
5	8:4–10	10:1–5	11:13–15
6	8:11–18	10:6–8	11:16–21
7	8:19–9:3	10:9–11	11:22–25
Maftir	9:1–3	10:9–11	11:22–25

== In ancient parallels ==
The parashah has parallels or is discussed in these ancient sources:

=== Deuteronomy chapter 9 ===
Numbers 13:22, 28 refer to the "children of Anak" (יְלִדֵי הָעֲנָק, yelidei ha-anak); Numbers 13:33 refers to the "sons of Anak" (בְּנֵי עֲנָק, benei anak); and Deuteronomy 1:28, 2:10–11, 2:21, and 9:2 refer to the "Anakim" (עֲנָקִים). John A. Wilson suggested that the Anakim may be related to the Iy-‘anaq geographic region named in Middle Kingdom Egyptian (19th to 18th century BCE) pottery bowls that had been inscribed with the names of enemies and then shattered as a kind of curse.

=== Deuteronomy chapter 11 ===
Exodus 3:8, 17; 13:5; and 33:3; Leviticus 20:24; Numbers 13:27 and 14:8; and Deuteronomy 6:3, 11:9, 26:9, 26:15, 27:3, and 31:20 describe the Land of Israel as a land flowing "with milk and honey." Similarly, the Middle Egyptian (early second millennium BCE) tale of Sinuhe Palestine described the Land of Israel or, as the Egyptian tale called it, the land of Yaa: "It was a good land called Yaa. Figs were in it and grapes. It had more wine than water. Abundant was its honey, plentiful its oil. All kind of fruit were on its trees. Barley was there and emmer, and no end of cattle of all kinds."

== In inner-Biblical interpretation ==
The parashah has parallels or is discussed in these Biblical sources:

=== Deuteronomy chapter 7 ===
The gradual progression into the Promised Land, predicted in Deuteronomy 7:12 to take place "little by little" (m’at m’at), echoed the same prediction in Exodus 23:29–30. This progression was born out in Joshua 13:13 and 15:63, which record that the Gerushites, Maachatites, and Jebusites continued to live in the land of Israel "to this day," and by Joshua 16:10 and 17:11–13, which refer to the Canaanites continuing to live under conditions of forced labor in Gezer and in the territory of the tribe of Manasseh.

=== Deuteronomy chapter 9 ===
Deuteronomy 9:1 uses the same words "Shema, Yisrael" as the exhortation in Deuteronomy 6:4. Commentators suggest that the same words are used because "a fresh portion of the exhortation begins here," or because this was "a new discourse, delivered at some distance of time from the former, probably on the next sabbath day."

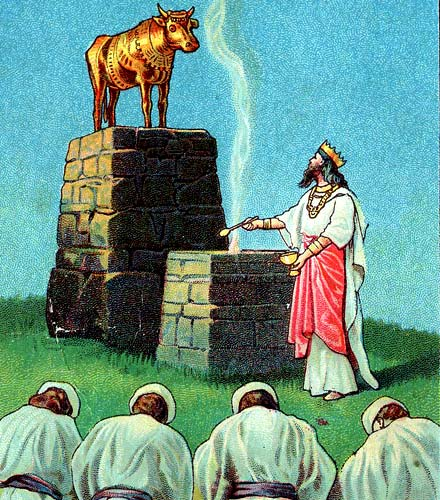
Jeroboam's Idolatry (illustration from a Bible card published 1904 by the Providence Lithograph Company)

1 Kings 12:25–33 reports a parallel story of golden calves. King Jeroboam of the northern Kingdom of Israel made two calves of gold out of a desire to prevent the kingdom from returning to allegiance to the house of David and the southern Kingdom of Judah. In Exodus 32:4, the people said of the Golden Calf, "This is your god, O Israel, that brought you up out of the land of Egypt." Similarly, in 1 Kings 12:28, Jeroboam told the people of his golden calves, "You have gone up long enough to Jerusalem; behold your gods, O Israel, that brought you up out of the land of Egypt." Jeroboam set up one of the calves in Bethel, and the other in Dan, and the people went to worship before the calf in Dan.

In Deuteronomy 9:27 and Exodus 32:13, Moses called on God to remember God's covenant with Abraham, Isaac, and Jacob to deliver the Israelites from God's wrath after the incident of the Golden Calf. Similarly, God remembered Noah to deliver him from the flood in Genesis 8:1; God promised to remember God's covenant not to destroy the Earth again by flood in Genesis 9:15–16; God remembered Abraham to deliver Lot from the destruction of Sodom and Gomorrah in Genesis 19:29; God remembered Rachel to deliver her from childlessness in Genesis 30:22; God remembered God's covenant with Abraham, Isaac, and Jacob to deliver the Israelites from Egyptian bondage in Exodus 2:24 and 6:5–6; God promised to "remember" God's covenant with Jacob, Isaac, and Abraham to deliver the Israelites and the Land of Israel in Leviticus 26:42–45; the Israelites were to blow upon their trumpets to be remembered and delivered from their enemies in Numbers 10:9; Samson called on God to deliver him from the Philistines in Judges 16:28; Hannah prayed for God to remember her and deliver her from childlessness in 1 Samuel 1:11 and God remembered Hannah's prayer to deliver her from childlessness in 1 Samuel 1:19; Hezekiah called on God to remember Hezekiah's faithfulness to deliver him from sickness in 2 Kings 20:3 and Isaiah 38:3; Jeremiah called on God to remember God's covenant with the Israelites to not condemn them in Jeremiah 14:21; Jeremiah called on God to remember him and think of him, and avenge him of his persecutors in Jeremiah 15:15; God promises to remember God's covenant with the Israelites and establish an everlasting covenant in Ezekiel 16:60; God remembers the cry of the humble in Zion to avenge them in Psalm 9:13; David called upon God to remember God's compassion and mercy in Psalm 25:6; Asaph called on God to remember God's congregation to deliver them from their enemies in Psalm 74:2; God remembered that the Israelites were only human in Psalm 78:39; Ethan the Ezrahite called on God to remember how short Ethan's life was in Psalm 89:48; God remembers that humans are but dust in Psalm 103:14; God remembers God's covenant with Abraham, Isaac, and Jacob in Psalm 105:8–10; God remembers God's word to Abraham to deliver the Israelites to the Land of Israel in Psalm 105:42–44; the Psalmist calls on God to remember him to favor God's people, to think of him at God's salvation, that he might behold the prosperity of God's people in Psalm 106:4–5; God remembered God's covenant and repented according to God's mercy to deliver the Israelites in the wake of their rebellion and iniquity in Psalm 106:4–5; the Psalmist calls on God to remember God's word to God's servant to give him hope in Psalm 119:49; God remembered us in our low estate to deliver us from our adversaries in Psalm 136:23–24; Job called on God to remember him to deliver him from God's wrath in Job 14:13; Nehemiah prayed to God to remember God's promise to Moses to deliver the Israelites from exile in Nehemiah 1:8; and Nehemiah prayed to God to remember him to deliver him for good in Nehemiah 13:14–31.

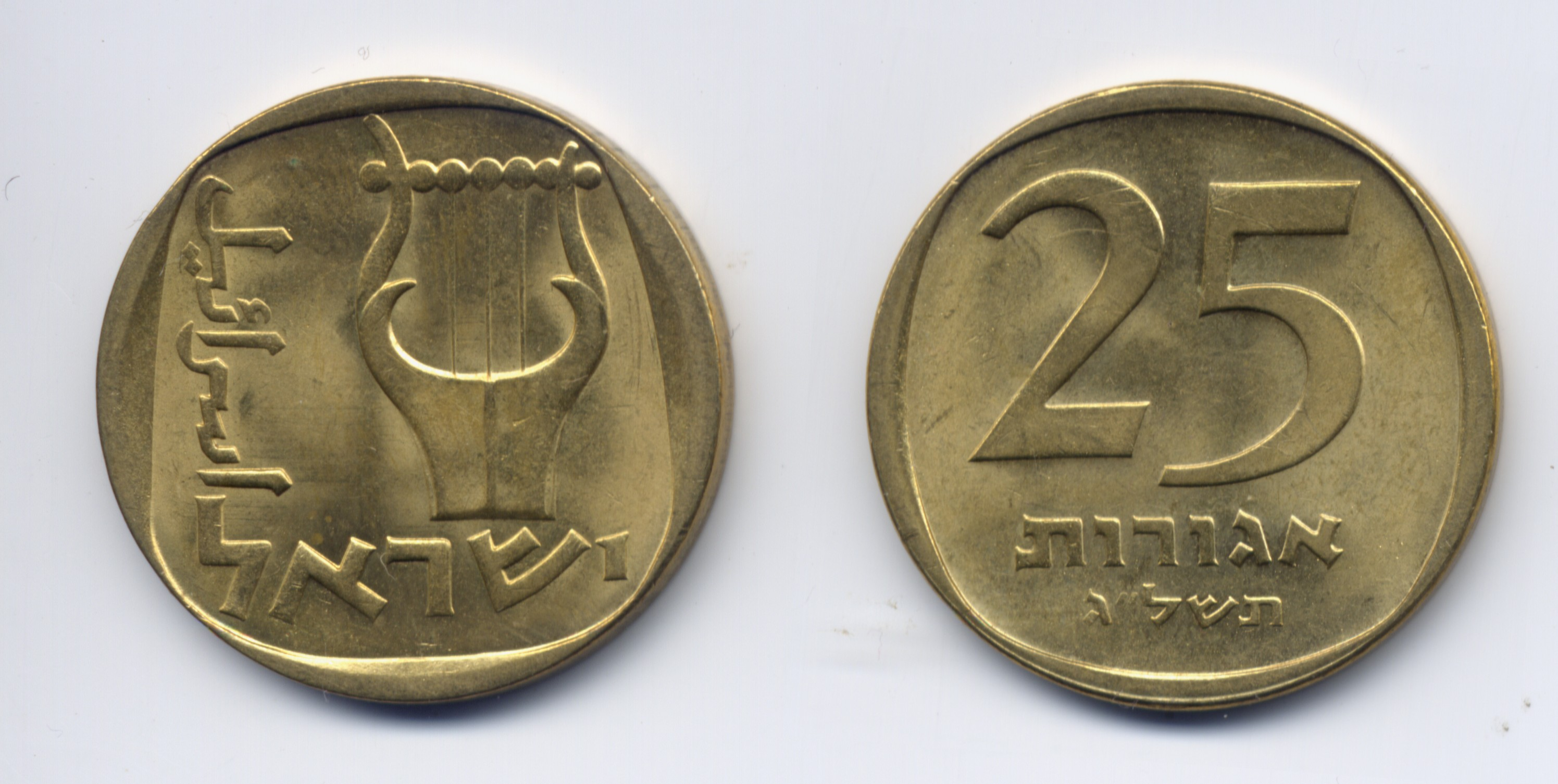
A lyre on an Israeli coin

=== Deuteronomy chapter 10 ===
Deuteronomy 10:8 assigns the Levites the duties of bearing the Ark of the Covenant, to stand before God to minister to God, and to bless in God's name. Elsewhere in the Hebrew Bible, Deuteronomy 33:10 reports that Levites taught the law. Deuteronomy 17:9–10 reports that they served as judges. 1 Chronicles 23:3–5 reports that of 38,000 Levite men age 30 and up, 24,000 were in charge of the work of the Temple in Jerusalem, 6,000 were officers and magistrates, 4,000 were gatekeepers, and 4,000 praised God with instruments and song. 1 Chronicles 15:16 reports that King David installed Levites as singers with musical instruments, harps, lyres, and cymbals, and 1 Chronicles 16:4 reports that David appointed Levites to minister before the Ark, to invoke, to praise, and to extol God, and 2 Chronicles 5:12 reports that at the inauguration of Solomon's Temple, Levites sang dressed in fine linen, holding cymbals, harps, and lyres, to the east of the altar, and with them 120 priests blew trumpets. 2 Chronicles 20:19 reports that Levites of the sons of Kohath and of the sons of Korah extolled God in song. Eleven Psalms identify themselves as of the Korahites.

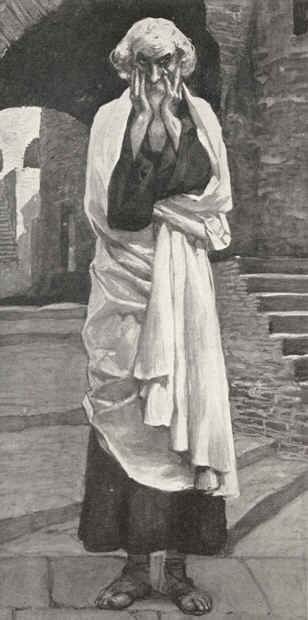
Micah (watercolor circa 1896–1902 by James Tissot)

The question of Deuteronomy 10:12, "What does the Lord your God require of you?" parallels Micah 6:8, "It has been told you, O man, what is good, and what the Lord does require of you."

The exhortation of Deuteronomy 10:12 and 11:22 to "walk in God's ways" reflects a recurring theme also present in Deuteronomy 5:30, 8:6, 19:9, 26:17, 28:9, and 30:16.

The metaphor of an uncircumcised heart in Deuteronomy 10:16 also appears in Leviticus 26:41, Jeremiah 4:4 and 9:26, and Ezekiel 44:9.

Deuteronomy 10:17–19 admonishes the Israelites not to wrong the stranger, "for you were strangers in the land of Egypt." (See also Exodus 22:20; 23:9; Leviticus 19:33–34; Deuteronomy 1:16; 24:14–15, 17–22; and 27:19.) Similarly, in Amos 3:1, the 8th century BCE prophet Amos anchored his pronouncements in the covenant community's Exodus history, saying, "Hear this word that the Lord has spoken against you, O children of Israel, against the whole family that I brought up out of the land of Egypt."

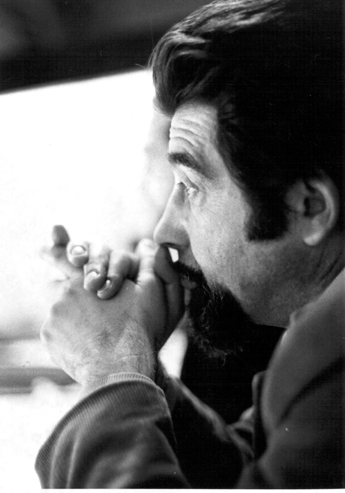
Schwarzschild

Deuteronomy 10:18 reports that God "executes justice for the fatherless and widow." God's justice is a recurring theme in the Hebrew Bible (תַּנַ"ךְ, Tanakh). In Genesis 18:25, Abraham asked, "Shall not the Judge of all the earth do justly?" In Psalm 9:5, the Psalmist tells God, "You have maintained my right and my cause; You sat upon the throne as the righteous Judge." Psalm 33:5 reports that God "loves righteousness and justice." In Psalm 89:14, the Psalmist tells God, "Righteousness and justice are the foundation of Your throne." Psalm 103:6 says that God "executes righteousness, and acts of justice for all who are oppressed"; Psalm 140:13 (Psalm 140:12 in the King James Version) says that God "will maintain the cause of the poor, and the right of the needy"; and Psalm 146:7 says that God "executes justice for the oppressed." And Isaiah 28:17 quotes God saying, "I will make justice the line, and righteousness the plummet." Steven Schwarzschild concluded that "God's primary attribute of action . . . is justice" and "Justice has widely been said to be the moral value which singularly characterizes Judaism."

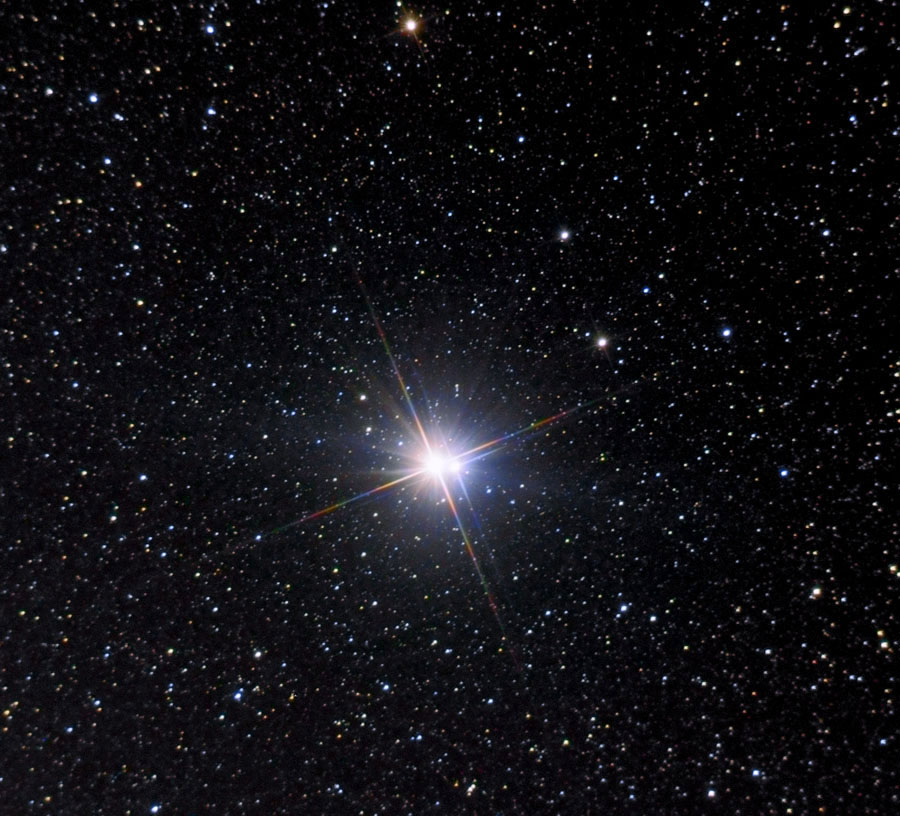
"Now the Lord your God has made you as the stars of heaven for multitude." (Deuteronomy 10:22.)

In Deuteronomy 10:22, Moses reported that God had made the Israelites as numerous as the stars. In Genesis 15:5, God promised that Abraham's descendants would be as numerous as the stars of heaven. Similarly, in Genesis 22:17, God promised that Abraham's descendants would be as numerous as the stars of heaven and the sands on the seashore. In Genesis 26:4, God reminded Isaac that God had promised Abraham that God would make his heirs as numerous as the stars. In Genesis 32:13, Jacob reminded God that God had promised that Jacob's descendants would be as numerous as the sands. In Exodus 32:13, Moses reminded God that God had promised to make the Patriarch's descendants as numerous as the stars. In Deuteronomy 1:10, Moses reported that God had multiplied the Israelites until they were then as numerous as the stars. And Deuteronomy 28:62 foretold that the Israelites would be reduced in number after having been as numerous as the stars.

=== Deuteronomy chapter 11 ===
Deuteronomy 6:8 and 11:18, two verses recited together in the Shema, both exhort one to bind the instruction as a sign on one's hand and let them serve as a symbol on one's forehead. In turn, Proverbs 6:20–22 and 7:2–3 echo the Shema. As Deuteronomy 6:8 and 11:18 call on listeners to bind the instruction as signs on their hands and let them serve as symbols on their foreheads, Proverbs 3:3 calls on them to bind the teachings about their throats and write them on the tablets of their minds, Proverbs 6:21 calls on them to tie them over their hearts always and bind them around their throats, and Proverbs 7:3 calls on them to bind them on their fingers and write them on the tablets of their minds. Similarly, Proverbs 1:9 likens instruction to a graceful wreath upon one’s head and a necklace about one’s throat, and in Jeremiah 31:33 God puts God’s teaching into their inmost being and inscribes it upon their hearts.

== In early nonrabbinic interpretation ==
The parashah has parallels or is discussed in these early nonrabbinic sources:

=== Deuteronomy chapter 8 ===
Philo saw in Deuteronomy 8:12–17 accusations against "the self-loving man." Philo cited Cain as an example of one who (in Genesis 4:3) showed his gratitude to God too slowly. Philo taught that we should hurry to please God without delay. Thus Deuteronomy 23:22 enjoins, "If you vow a vow, you shall not delay to perform it." Philo explained that a vow is a request to God for good things, and Deuteronomy 23:22 thus enjoins that when one has received them, one must offer gratitude to God as soon as possible. Philo divided those who fail to do so into three types: (1) those who forget the benefits that they have received, (2) those who pridefully see themselves and not God as the authors of what they receive, and (3) those who realize that God caused what they received, but still say that they deserved it, because they are worthy to receive God's favor. Philo taught that Scripture opposes all three. Philo wrote that Deuteronomy 8:12–14 replies to the first group who forget, "Take care, lest when you have eaten and are filled, and when you have built fine houses and inhabited them, and when your flocks and your herds have increased, and when your silver and gold, and all that you possess is multiplied, you be lifted up in your heart, and forget the Lord your God." Philo taught that one does not forget God when one remembers one's own nothingness and God's exceeding greatness. Philo interpreted Deuteronomy 8:17 to reprove those who look upon themselves as the cause of what they have received, telling them: "Say not my own might, or the strength of my right hand has acquired me all this power, but remember always the Lord your God, who gives you the might to acquire power." And Philo read Deuteronomy 9:4–5 to address those who think that they deserve what they have received, saying, "You do not enter into this land to possess it because of your righteousness, or because of the holiness of your heart; but, in the first place, because of the iniquity of these nations, since God has brought on them the destruction of wickedness; and in the second place, that He may establish the covenant that He swore to our Fathers." Philo interpreted the term "covenant" figuratively to mean God's graces. Thus Philo concluded that if we discard forgetfulness, ingratitude, and self-love, we will no longer through delay miss attaining the genuine worship of God, but we shall meet God, having prepared ourselves to do what God commands us.

== In classical Rabbinic interpretation ==
The parashah is discussed in the rabbinic literature from the era of the Mishnah and Talmud:

=== Deuteronomy chapter 7 ===
A midrash likened the second word of Deuteronomy 7:12, עֵקֶב, eikev ("if" or "because"), to the word עֲקֵבַי akeivai ("footsteps") in Psalm 49:6, which the midrash interpreted to mean: "Why should I fear in the days of evil? The iniquity of my footsteps encompasses me." The midrash taught that people sometimes fail to observe minor commandments, thus trampling those commandments beneath their heels. The midrash thus taught that the Psalmist feared the day of judgment because he may have trampled minor commandments.

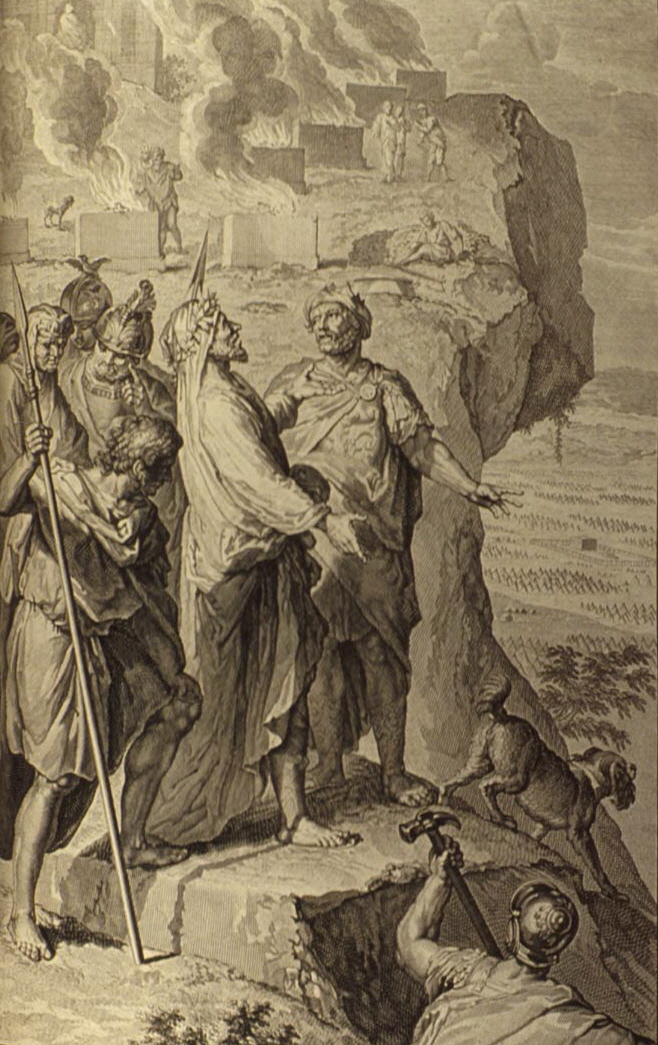
Balaam Blessing the Israelites (illustration from the 1728 Figures de la Bible)

Another midrash played on two possible meanings of the second word of Deuteronomy 7:12, עֵקֶב, eikev, "as a consequence" and "the end." Israel asked God when God would grant reward for the observance of commandments. God replied that when people observe commandments, they enjoy some fruits now, but God will give them their full reward in the end, after death.

Another midrash played on two possible meanings of the second word of Deuteronomy 7:12, עֵקֶב, eikev, "as a consequence" and "heel." The midrash interpreted the words "upon Edom I cast my shoe" in Psalms 60:10 and 108:10 to mean that God says that when Israel repents, then God will tread with God's heel, so to speak, on Israel's enemy Edom. And the midrash taught, in the words of Deuteronomy 7:12, that "it shall come to pass, because (eikev) you hearken."

Rabbi Samuel bar Naḥmani interpreted the words "that the Lord your God shall keep for you" in Deuteronomy 7:12, teaching that all the good that Israel enjoys in this world results from the blessings with which Balaam blessed Israel, but the blessings with which the Patriarchs blessed Israel are reserved for the time to come, as signified by the words, "that the Lord your God shall keep for you."

A midrash interpreted the Priestly Blessing of Numbers 6:24, "The Lord . . . keep you," to pray that God would keep the covenant that God made with Israel's forefathers, as Deuteronomy 7:12 says, "The Lord your God shall keep with you the covenant . . . ."

Rabbi Bibi ben Giddal said that Simeon the Just taught that the law prohibited a Jew from robbing a non-Jew, although a Jew could take possession of a non-Jew's lost article. Rav Huna read Deuteronomy 7:16 to prohibit a Jew from robbing a non-Jew, because Deuteronomy 7:16 provided that the Israelites were to take from the enemies that God would deliver to them in time of war, thus implying that the Israelites could not take from non-Jews in time of peace, when God had not delivered them into the Israelites' hands.

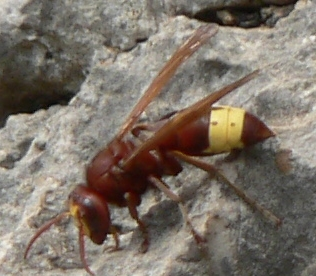
The oriental hornet

In Exodus 23:28, God promised to "send the hornet (צִּרְעָה) before you, which shall drive out the Hivite, the Canaanite, and the Hittite, from before you," and in Deuteronomy 7:20, Moses promised that "the Lord your God will send the hornet (צִּרְעָה) among them." But a baraita taught that the hornet did not pass over the Jordan River with the Israelites. Rabbi Simeon ben Lakish reconciled the two sources, explaining that the hornet stood on the eastern bank of the Jordan and shot its venom over the river at the Canaanites. The venom blinded the Canaanites' eyes above and castrated them below, as Amos 2:9 says, "Yet destroyed I the Amorite before them, whose height was like the height of the cedars, and he was strong as the oaks; yet I destroyed his fruit from above and his roots from beneath." Rav Papa offered an alternative explanation, saying that there were two hornets, one in the time of Moses and the other in the time of Joshua. The former did not pass over the Jordan, but the latter did.

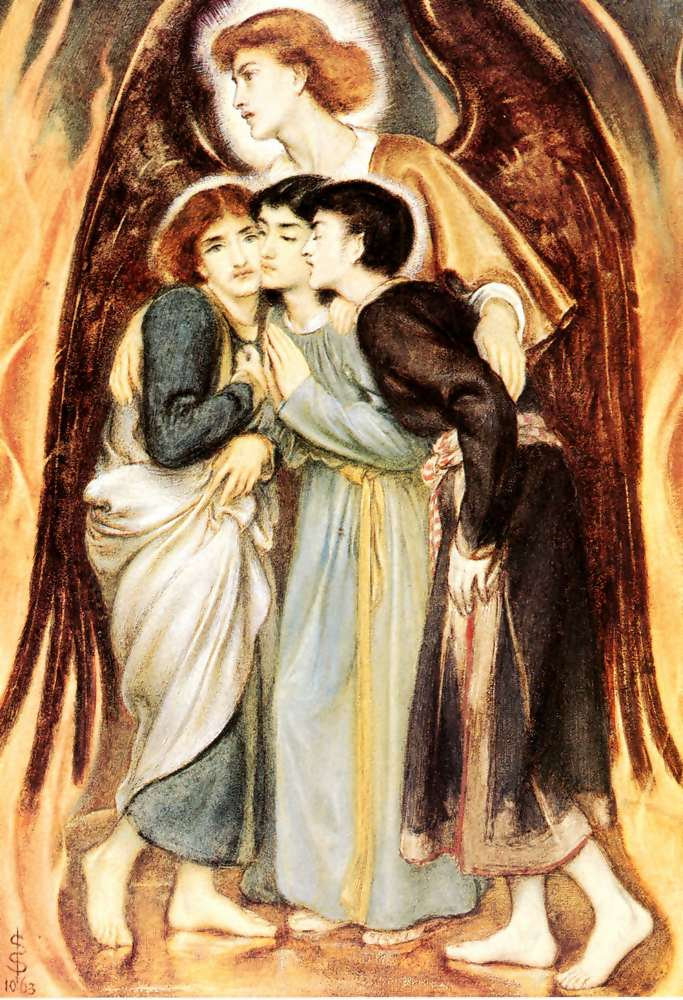
Shadrach, Meshach, and Abednego (Ḥananiah, Mishael, and Azariah) (1863 painting by Simeon Solomon)

Chapter 3 of tractate Avodah Zarah in the Mishnah, Jerusalem Talmud, and Babylonian Talmud interpreted the laws of deriving no benefit from idols using Deuteronomy 7:25–26.

The Rabbis told the story that God, Daniel, and Nebuchadnezzar conspired to keep Daniel out of the fiery furnace. God said: "Let Daniel depart, lest people say that Ḥananiah, Mishael, and Azariah were delivered through Daniel's merit instead of their own." Daniel said: "Let me go, so that I will not become a fulfillment of the words (in Deuteronomy 7:25), 'the graven images of their gods you shall burn with fire.'" And Nebuchadnezzar said: "Let Daniel depart, lest people say that the king has burned his god in fire."

The Mekhilta of Rabbi Ishmael used Deuteronomy 7:25 to help interpret the commandment not to covet in Exodus 20:14. The Mekhilta asked whether the commandment not to covet in Exodus 20:14 applied so far as to prohibit merely expressing one's desire for one's neighbor's things in words. But the Mekhilta noted that Deuteronomy 7:25 says, "You shall not covet the silver or the gold that is on them, nor take it for yourself." And the Mekhilta reasoned that just as in Deuteronomy 7:25 the word "covet" applies only to prohibit the carrying out of one's desire into practice, so also Exodus 20:14 prohibits only the carrying out of one's desire into practice.

The Gemara deduced from the command of Deuteronomy 7:26, "you shall not bring an abomination into your house, lest you be a cursed thing like it," that whatever one might bring into being out of an idolatrous thing would have the same cursed status.

Rabbi Joḥanan in the name of Rabbi Simeon ben Yohai noted the word "abomination" in common in both Deuteronomy 7:26 and Proverbs 16:5 and deduced that people who are haughty of spirit are as though they worshiped idols.

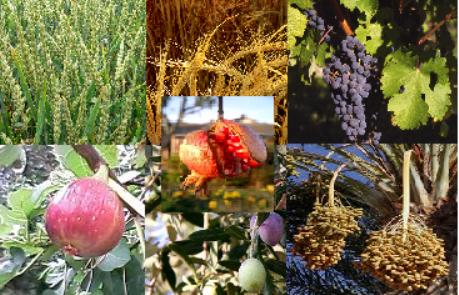
The Seven Species

=== Deuteronomy chapter 8 ===
The Mishnah taught that first fruits were brought only from the Seven Species (Shiv'at Ha-Minim) that Deuteronomy 8:8 noted to praise the Land of Israel: wheat, barley, grapes, figs, pomegranates, olive-oil, and date-honey. But first fruits could not be brought from dates grown on hills, or from valley-fruits, or from olives that were not of the choice kind.

In the Babylonian Talmud, Rav Judah taught that the commandment to recite the Grace after Meals (בִּרְכַּת הַמָּזוׂן, Birkat Hamazon) derives from Deuteronomy 8:10, "And you shall eat and be satisfied and bless the Lord your God." Similarly, the Tosefta taught that the invitation to the Grace after Meals derives from the words of Deuteronomy 8:10, "And you should eat, and be satisfied, and bless"; the first blessing of the Grace after Meals derives from the words of Deuteronomy 8:10, "the Lord, your God"; the blessing about the Land derives from the words of Deuteronomy 8:10, "for the land"; the blessing about Jerusalem derives from the words of Deuteronomy 8:10, "the good" (as Deuteronomy 3:25 refers to "this good mountain and Lebanon"); and the fourth blessing about the Good and Who does good derives from the words of Deuteronomy 8:10, "that He (God) has given you."

Chapter 7 of Tractate Berakhot in the Mishnah, Jerusalem Talmud, and Babylonian Talmud interpreted the laws of the Grace after Meals in Deuteronomy 8:10.

The Mishnah taught that if one has before one many types of food, Rabbi Judah taught that if there is one of the seven species for which the Land of Israel was praised among them, one recites the blessing over that first. But the Sages taught that one recites first a blessing over whichever of them one wants.

The Mishnah taught that women and minors were exempt from the obligations to recite the Shema prayer and wear tefillin, but are obligated in prayer, the mezuzah, and Grace after Meals.

The Mishnah taught that if a man is impure due to a seminal emission, he recites a blessing after eating food which, after partaking, one is obligated to recite a blessing, but he does not recite a blessing before. Rabbi Judah, however, taught that he recites the blessings before and after.

Rabbi Awira told—sometimes in the name of Rabbi Ammi, and sometimes in the name of Rabbi Assi—that the angels asked God whether God was not showing favor to Israel. And God asked the angels how God could not show favor to Israel, when Deuteronomy 8:10 required them to bless God when they had eaten and were satisfied, but the Israelites bless God even when they have eaten only the quantity of an olive or an egg.

Rabbi Joḥanan deduced from Deuteronomy 8:14 that people who are haughty of spirit are as though they had denied the fundamental principle of God's existence. And Naḥman bar Yitzchak found in Deuteronomy 8:14 a prohibition for haughtiness of spirit. For Rabbi Abin said in the name of Rabbi Ilai that wherever it is stated "Beware, lest" (as it does in Deuteronomy 8:11) the reference is to a prohibition.

In Deuteronomy 8:14, the heart becomes proud. A midrash catalogued the wide range of additional capabilities of the heart reported in the Hebrew Bible. The heart speaks, sees, hears, walks, falls, stands, rejoices, cries, is comforted, is troubled, becomes hardened, grows faint, grieves, fears, can be broken, rebels, invents, cavils, overflows, devises, desires, goes astray, lusts, is refreshed, can be stolen, is humbled, is enticed, errs, trembles, is awakened, loves, hates, envies, is searched, is rent, meditates, is like a fire, is like a stone, turns in repentance, becomes hot, dies, melts, takes in words, is susceptible to fear, gives thanks, covets, becomes hard, makes merry, acts deceitfully, speaks from out of itself, loves bribes, writes words, plans, receives commandments, acts with pride, makes arrangements, and aggrandizes itself.

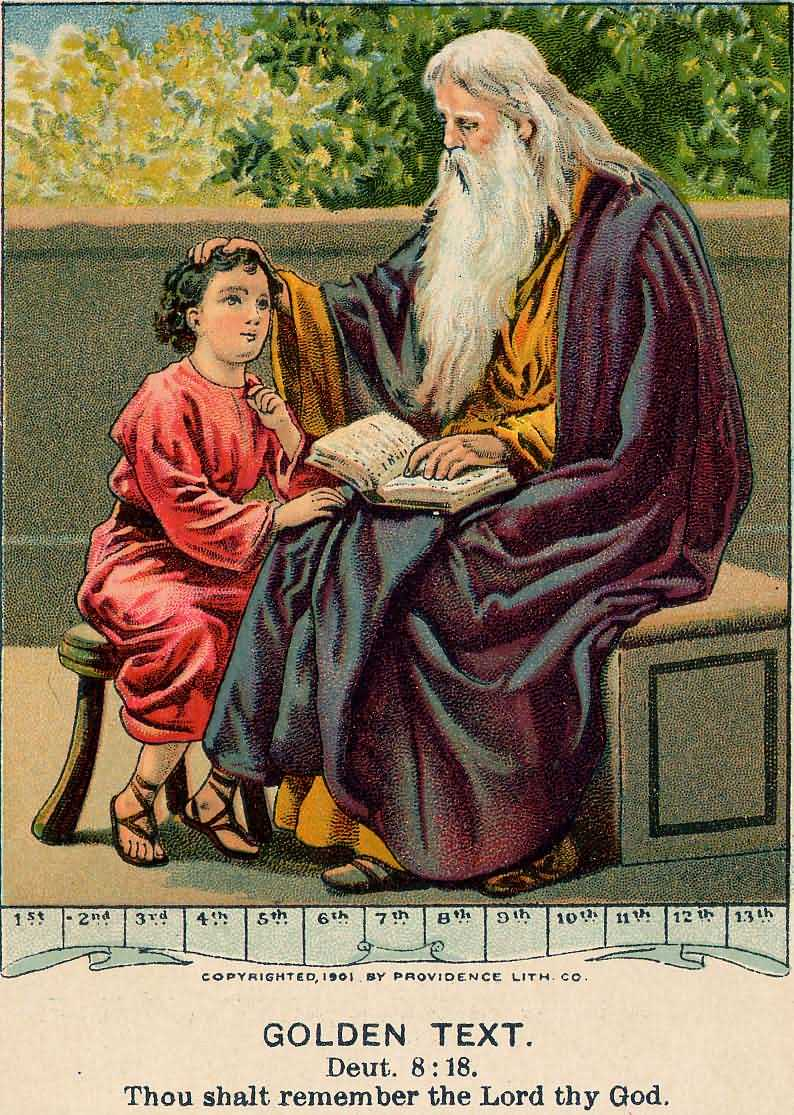
"You shall remember the Lord your God" (Bible card published 1901 by the Providence Lithograph Company)

The Pesikta de-Rav Kahana cited Deuteronomy 8:14 for the proposition that God's fate and Israel's fate are intertwined. According to Bar Kappara, God told Israel that the time of God's redemption (when God would release God's right hand, which was restrained while Israel is in exile) was in Israel's hand, and the time of Israel's redemption was in God's hand. As the time of God's redemption (and action) was in Israel's hand, therefore, Israel should heed the words of Deuteronomy 8:14, "let not your heart grow haughty so that you forget the Lord your God." And that the time of Israel's redemption was in God's hand was seen in Psalm 137:5, "If I forget you, O Jerusalem, My right hand will forget." To Rabbi Dosa, this verse meant that God said that if God forgot Jerusalem, God's right hand would forget how to perform miracles (and God would thus cease to be God).

A midrash taught that God told the Israelites that during all the 40 years that they spent in the wilderness, God did not make it necessary for them to escape. Rather, God cast their enemies down before them. As Deuteronomy 8:15 reports, there were numerous snakes, fiery serpents, and scorpions in the wilderness, but God did not allow them to harm the Israelites. Thus, God told Moses to write down in Numbers 33 the stages by which Israel journeyed in the wilderness, so that they would know the miracles that God had done for them.

The Sifre compared the admonition of Deuteronomy 11:26–30, "I set before you this day a blessing and a curse," to a person sitting at a crossroads with two paths ahead. One of the paths began with clear ground but ended in thorns. The other began with thorns but ended in clear ground. The person would tell passersby that the path that appeared clear would be fine for two or three steps, but end in thorns, and the path that began with thorns would be difficult for two or three steps, but end in clear ground. So, said the Sifre, Moses told Israel that one might see the wicked flourish in this world for a short time, but in the end, they will have occasion to regret. And the righteous who are distressed in this world will in the end have occasion for rejoicing, as Deuteronomy 8:16 says, "that He might prove you, to do you good at the end."

=== Deuteronomy chapter 9 ===
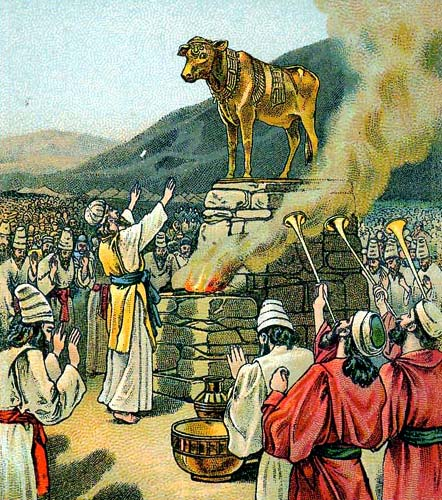
Worshiping the Golden Calf (illustration from a Bible card published 1901 by the Providence Lithograph Company)

Rabbi Tanhuma taught that Moses prostrated himself before the Israelites and said to them the words of Deuteronomy 9:1, "You are to pass over the Jordan," noting that he would not. Moses gave the Israelites the opportunity to pray for him, but they did not. The midrash compared this to a king who had many children by a noble lady. The lady was undutiful to him, and he decided to divorce her. He told her that he was going to marry another wife. She asked who, and he told her. She summoned her children and told them that their father intended to divorce her and marry the other woman, and asked the children if they could bear being subjected to her. She thought that perhaps they would understand what she meant and would intercede with their father on her behalf, but they did not understand. As they did not understand, she commanded them only for their own sake to be mindful of the honor of their father. So it was with Moses. When God told him in Deuteronomy 3:27, "You shall not go over this Jordan," Moses spoke to the Israelites and stressed the words in Deuteronomy 9:1, "You are to pass over."

A baraita taught that because of God's displeasure with the Israelites, the north wind did not blow on them in any of the 40 years during which they wandered in the wilderness. Rashi attributed God's displeasure to the Golden Calf, although the Tosafot attributed it to the incident of the spies in Numbers 13.

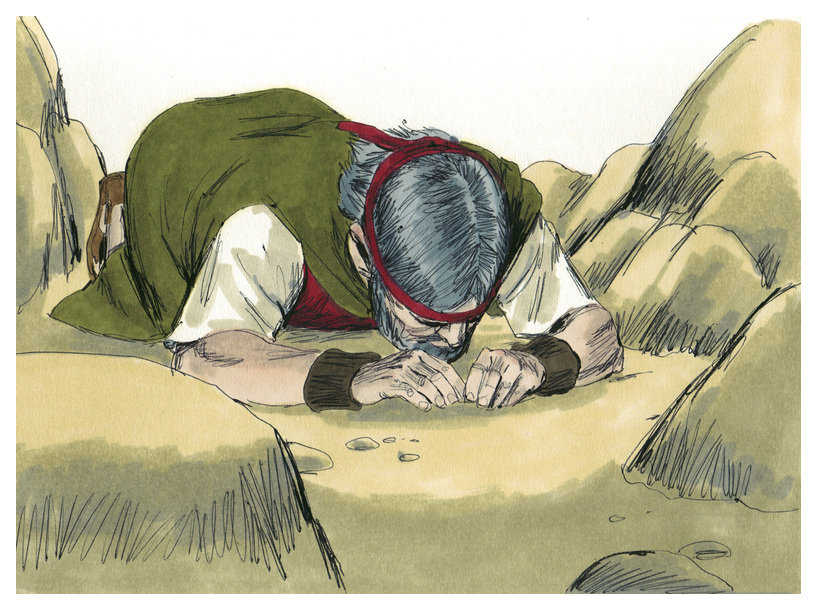
Moses bowed before God (1984 illustration by Jim Padgett, courtesy of Sweet Publishing)

Rabbi Simeon ben Yohai taught that because the generation of the Flood transgressed the Torah that God gave humanity after Moses had stayed on the mountain for 40 days and 40 nights (as reported in Exodus 24:18 and 34:28 and Deuteronomy 9:9–11, 18, 25; and 10:10), God announced in Genesis 7:4 that God would "cause it to rain upon the earth 40 days and 40 nights."

Noting that in Deuteronomy 9:9, Moses said, "And I sat (וָאֵשֵׁב, va-eisheiv) on the mount," and in Deuteronomy 10:10, Moses said, "And I stood in the mount, Rav taught that Moses stood when he learned (from God) and sat while he reviewed what he had learned (by himself). Rabbi Ḥanina taught that Moses neither sat nor stood but bowed. Rabbi Joḥanan taught that "sat" (וָאֵשֵׁב, va-eisheiv) here meant only "stayed," as it does in Deuteronomy 1:46, which says, "And you stayed (תֵּשְׁבוּ, teshbu) in Kadesh many days." Rava taught that Moses learned the easy things standing and the hard ones sitting.

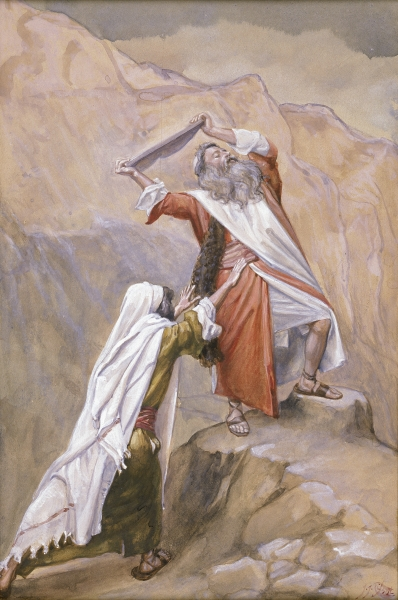
Moses Destroys the Tables of the Ten Commandments (watercolor circa 1896–1902 by James Tissot)

A midrash explained why Moses broke the stone tablets. When the Israelites committed the sin of the Golden Calf, God sat in judgment to condemn them, as Deuteronomy 9:14 says, "Let Me alone, that I may destroy them," but God had not yet condemned them. So Moses took the tablets from God to appease God's wrath. The midrash compared the act of Moses to that of a king's marriage-broker. The king sent the broker to secure a wife for the king, but while the broker was on the road, the woman corrupted herself with another man. The broker (who was entirely innocent) took the marriage document that the king had given the broker to seal the marriage and tore it, reasoning that it would be better for the woman to be judged as an unmarried woman than as a wife.

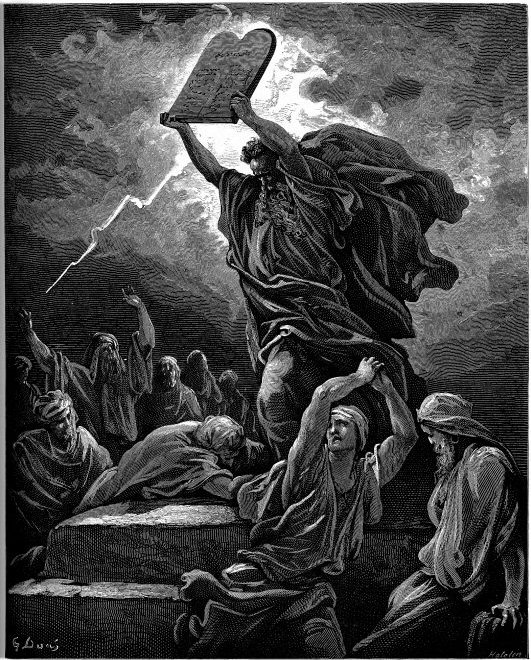
Moses Smashing the Tables of the Law (engraving by Gustave Doré from the 1865 La Sainte Bible)

In Deuteronomy 18:15, Moses foretold that "A prophet will the Lord your God raise up for you . . . like me," and Rabbi Joḥanan thus taught that prophets would have to be, like Moses, strong, wealthy, wise, and meek. Strong, for Exodus 40:19 says of Moses, "he spread the tent over the tabernacle," and a Master taught that Moses himself spread it, and Exodus 26:16 reports, "Ten cubits shall be the length of a board." Similarly, the strength of Moses can be derived from Deuteronomy 9:17, in which Moses reports, "And I took the two tablets, and cast them out of my two hands, and broke them," and it was taught that the tablets were six handbreadths in length, six in breadth, and three in thickness. Wealthy, as Exodus 34:1 reports God's instruction to Moses, "Carve yourself two tablets of stone," and the Rabbis interpreted the verse to teach that the chips would belong to Moses. Wise, for Rav and Samuel both said that 50 gates of understanding were created in the world, and all but one were given to Moses, for Psalm 8:6 said of Moses, "You have made him a little lower than God." Meek, for Numbers 12:3 reports, "Now the man Moses was very meek."

The Avot of Rabbi Natan read the listing of places in Deuteronomy 1:1 to allude to how God tested the Israelites with ten trials in the Wilderness, including that of the Golden Calf in Deuteronomy 9:16, and they failed them all. The words "In the wilderness" alludes to the Golden Calf, as Exodus 32:8 reports. "On the plain" alludes to how they complained about not having water, as Exodus 17:3 reports. "Facing Suf" alludes to how they rebelled at the Sea of Reeds (or some say to the idol that Micah made). Rabbi Judah cited Psalms 106:7, "They rebelled at the Sea of Reeds." "Between Paran" alludes to the Twelve Spies, as Numbers 13:3 says, "Moses sent them from the wilderness of Paran." "And Tophel" alludes to the frivolous words (תפלות, tiphlot) they said about the manna. "Lavan" alludes to Koraḥ's mutiny. "Ḥatzerot" alludes to the quails. And in Deuteronomy 9:22, it says, "At Tav'erah, and at Masah, and at Kivrot HaTa'avah." And "Di-zahav" alludes to when Aaron said to them: "Enough (דַּי, dai) of this golden (זָהָב, zahav) sin that you have committed with the Calf!" But Rabbi Eliezer ben Ya'akov said it means "Terrible enough (דַּי, dai) is this sin that Israel was punished to last from now until the resurrection of the dead."

Similarly, the school of Rabbi Yannai interpreted the place name Di-zahab (דִי זָהָב) in Deuteronomy 1:1 to refer to one of the Israelites' sins that Moses recounted in the opening of his address. The school of Rabbi Yannai deduced from the word Di-zahab that Moses spoke insolently towards heaven. The school of Rabbi Yannai taught that Moses told God that it was because of the silver and gold (זָהָב, zahav) that God showered on the Israelites until they said "Enough" (דַּי, dai) that the Israelites made the Golden Calf. They said in the school of Rabbi Yannai that a lion does not roar with excitement over a basket of straw but over a basket of meat. Rabbi Oshaia likened it to the case of a man who had a lean but large-limbed cow. The man gave the cow good feed to eat, and the cow started kicking him. The man deduced that it was feeding the cow good feed that caused the cow to kick him. Rabbi Ḥiyya bar Abba likened it to the case of a man who had a son and bathed him, anointed him, gave him plenty to eat and drink, hung a purse round his neck, and set him down at the door of a brothel. How could the boy help sinning? Rav Aha the son of Rav Huna said in the name of Rav Sheshet that this bears out the popular saying that a full stomach leads to a bad impulse. As Hosea 13:6 says, "When they were fed they became full, they were filled and their heart was exalted; therefore they have forgotten Me."

A midrash recounted how at first (after the incident of the Golden Calf), God pronounced a decree against Aaron, as Deuteronomy 9:20 says, "The Lord was very angry with Aaron to have destroyed (לְהַשְׁמִיד, le-hashmid) him." And Rabbi Joshua of Siknin taught in the name of Rabbi Levi that "destruction" (הַשְׁמָדָה, hashmadah) means extinction of offspring, as in Amos 2:9, which says, "And I destroyed ( וָאַשְׁמִיד, va-ashmid) his fruit from above, and his roots from beneath." But, as Rabbi Joshua ben Levi taught, prayer effects half atonement. So when Moses prayed on Aaron's behalf, God annulled half the decree. Aaron's two sons Nadab and Abihu died, and Aaron's two other sons remained. Thus, Leviticus 8:1–2 says, "And the Lord spoke to Moses, saying: ‘Take Aaron and his sons'" (implying that they were to be saved from death).

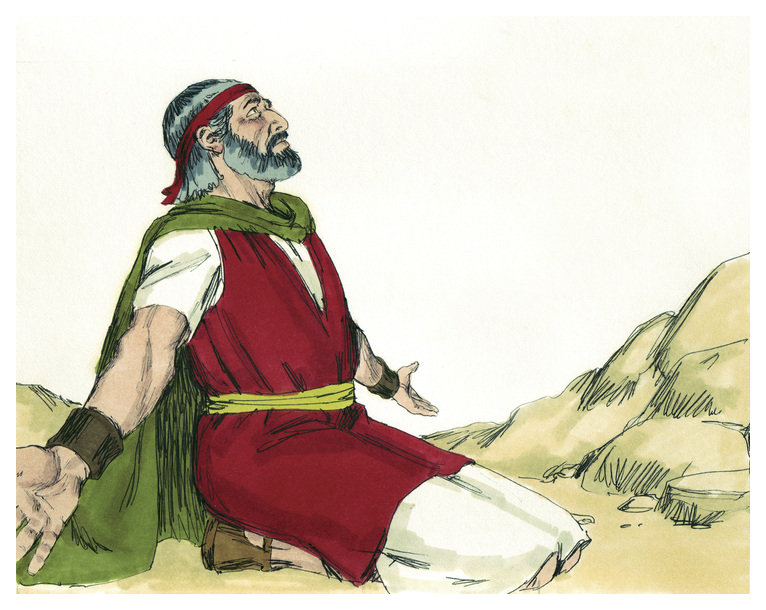
Moses prayed to God (1984 illustration by Jim Padgett, courtesy of Sweet Publishing)

The Pirke De-Rabbi Eliezer expounded on the exchange between God and Moses in Deuteronomy 9:26–29. The Pirke De-Rabbi Eliezer told that after the incident of the Golden Calf, God told Moses that the Israelites had forgotten God's might and had made an idol. Moses replied to God that while the Israelites had not yet sinned, God had called them "My people," as in Exodus 7:4, God had said, "And I will bring forth My hosts, My people." But Moses noted that once the Israelites had sinned, God told Moses (in Exodus 32:7), "Go, get down, for your people have corrupted themselves." Moses told God that the Israelites were indeed God's people, and God's inheritance, as Deuteronomy 9:29 reports Moses saying, "Yet they are Your people and Your inheritance."

=== Deuteronomy chapter 10 ===
A midrash likened God to a bridegroom, Israel to a bride, and Moses, in Deuteronomy 10:1, to the scribe who wrote the document of betrothal. The midrash noted that the Rabbis taught that documents of betrothal and marriage are written only with the consent of both parties, and the bridegroom pays the scribe's fee. The midrash then taught that God betrothed Israel at Sinai, reading Exodus 19:10 to say, "And the Lord said to Moses: 'Go to the people and betroth them today and tomorrow.'" The midrash taught that in Deuteronomy 10:1, God commissioned Moses to write the document, when God directed Moses, "Carve two tables of stone." And Deuteronomy 31:9 reports that Moses wrote the document, saying, "And Moses wrote this law." The midrash then taught that God compensated Moses for writing the document by giving him a lustrous countenance, as Exodus 34:29 reports, "Moses did not know that the skin of his face sent forth beams."

A midrash taught that God imposed on Moses the job of carving the two Tablets in Deuteronomy 10:1 in recompense for Moses having grown angry and breaking the first set of Tablets in Exodus 32:19.

The Rabbis taught that Deuteronomy 10:1 bears out Ecclesiastes 3:5, "A time to cast away stones, and a time to gather stones together." The Rabbis taught that Ecclesiastes 3:5 refers to Moses. For there was a time for Moses to cast away the Tablets in Exodus 32:19, and a time for him to restore them to Israel in Deuteronomy 10:1.

The Rabbis explained that God commanded Moses to carve two Tablets in Deuteronomy 10:1 because the two Tablets were to act as witnesses between God and Israel. The two Tablets corresponded to the two witnesses whom Deuteronomy 17:6 and 19:15 require to testify to a cause, to two groomsmen, to bridegroom and bride, to heaven and earth, to this world and the World To Come.

Reading the words, "which you broke, and you shall put them," in Deuteronomy 10:2, Rav Joseph noted that the verse employs superfluous words to describe the Tablets. Rav Joseph reasoned that the two mentionings of the Tablets teaches that both the Tablets and the fragments of the Tablets that Moses broke were deposited in the Ark. Rav Joseph deduced from this that a scholar who has forgotten his learning through no fault of his own (through old age, sickness, or trouble, but not through willful neglect) is still due respect (by analogy to the broken pieces of the tablets that the Israelites nonetheless treated with sanctity).

Resh Lakish deduced from the interjection of the apparently parenthetical words, "which you broke," in Deuteronomy 10:2 that God was thereby saying to Moses that Moses did well to break them.

The Pirke De-Rabbi Eliezer explained how the Levites came to minister before God, as directed in Deuteronomy 10:8. The Pirke De-Rabbi Eliezer taught that Jacob wished to ford the Jabbok River and was detained there by an angel, who asked Jacob whether Jacob had not told God (in Genesis 28:22), "Of all that you shall give me I will surely give a tenth to You." So Jacob gave a tenth of all the cattle that he had brought from Paddan Aram. Jacob had brought some 5,500 animals, so his tithe came to 550 animals. Jacob again tried to ford the Jabbok but was hindered again. The angel once again asked Jacob whether Jacob had not told God (in Genesis 28:22), "Of all that you shall give me I will surely give a tenth to You." The angel noted that Jacob had sons, and that Jacob had not given a tithe of them. So Jacob set aside the four firstborn sons (whom the law excluded from the tithe) of each of the four mothers, and eight sons remained. He began to count from Simeon, and included Benjamin, and continued the count from the beginning. And so Levi was reckoned as the tenth son, and thus the tithe, holy to God, as Leviticus 27:32 says, "The tenth shall be holy to the Lord." So the angel Michael descended and took Levi and brought him up before the Throne of Glory and told God that Levi was God's lot. And God blessed him, that the sons of Levi should minister on earth before God, as directed in Deuteronomy 10:8 like the ministering angels in heaven.

Rabbi Hanina deduced from Deuteronomy 10:12 that everything is in the hand of Heaven except the fear of Heaven, for Deuteronomy 10:12 says: "What does the Lord your God ask of you, but only to fear the Lord your God." The Gemara asked whether the fear of Heaven was such a little thing that Deuteronomy 10:12 says "only." Rabbi Ḥanina said in the name Rabbi Simeon ben Yohai that God has in God's treasury nothing but a store of the fear of Heaven, as Isaiah 33:6 says: "The fear of the Lord is His treasure," and thus the fear of Heaven must be a great thing. The Gemara responded that for Moses, the fear of Heaven was a small thing, for he had it. Rabbi Ḥanina illustrated with a parable: If a man is asked for a big article and he has it, it seems like a small article to him; if he is asked for a small article and he does not have it, it seems like a big article to him.

The Sifre interpreted the "ways" of God referred to in Deuteronomy 10:12 (as well as Deuteronomy 5:30, 8:6, 11:22, 19:9, 26:17, 28:9, and 30:16) by making reference to Exodus 34:6–7, "The Lord, the Lord, God of mercy and grace, slow to wrath and abundant in mercy and truth, keeping lovingkindness for thousands, forgiving transgression, offense, and sin, and cleansing . . . ." Thus, the Sifre read Joel 3:5, “All who will be called by the name of the Lord shall be delivered,” to teach that just as Exodus 34:6 calls God “merciful and gracious,” we, too, should be merciful and gracious. And just as Psalm 11:7 says, “The Lord is righteous,” we, too, should be righteous.

Rav Awira (or some say Rabbi Joshua ben Levi) taught that the Evil Inclination has seven names. God called it "Evil" in Genesis 8:21, saying, "the imagination of man's heart is evil from his youth." Moses called it "the Uncircumcised" in Deuteronomy 10:16, saying, "Circumcise therefore the foreskin of your heart." David called it "Unclean" in Psalm 51:12; Solomon called it "the Enemy" in Proverbs 25:21–22; Isaiah called it "the Stumbling-Block" in Isaiah 57:14; Ezekiel called it "Stone" in Ezekiel 36:26; and Joel called it "the Hidden One" in Joel 2:20.

Rav Zeira counted five kinds of orlah (things uncircumcised) in the world: (1) uncircumcised ears (as in Jeremiah 6:10), (2) uncircumcised lips (as in Exodus 6:12), (3) uncircumcised hearts (as in Deuteronomy 10:16 and Jeremiah 9:26), (4) uncircumcised flesh (as in Genesis 17:14), and (5) uncircumcised trees (as in Leviticus 19:23). Rav Zeira taught that all the nations are uncircumcised in each of the first four ways, and all the house of Israel are uncircumcised in heart, in that their hearts do not allow them to do God's will. And Rav Zeira taught that in the future, God will take away from Israel the uncircumcision of their hearts, and they will not harden their stubborn hearts anymore before their Creator, as Ezekiel 36:26 says, "And I will take away the stony heart out of your flesh, and I will give you an heart of flesh," and Genesis 17:11 says, "And you shall be circumcised in the flesh of your foreskin."

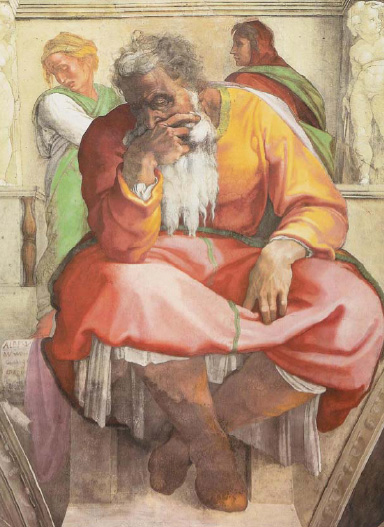
Jeremiah (fresco circa 1508–1512 by Michelangelo)

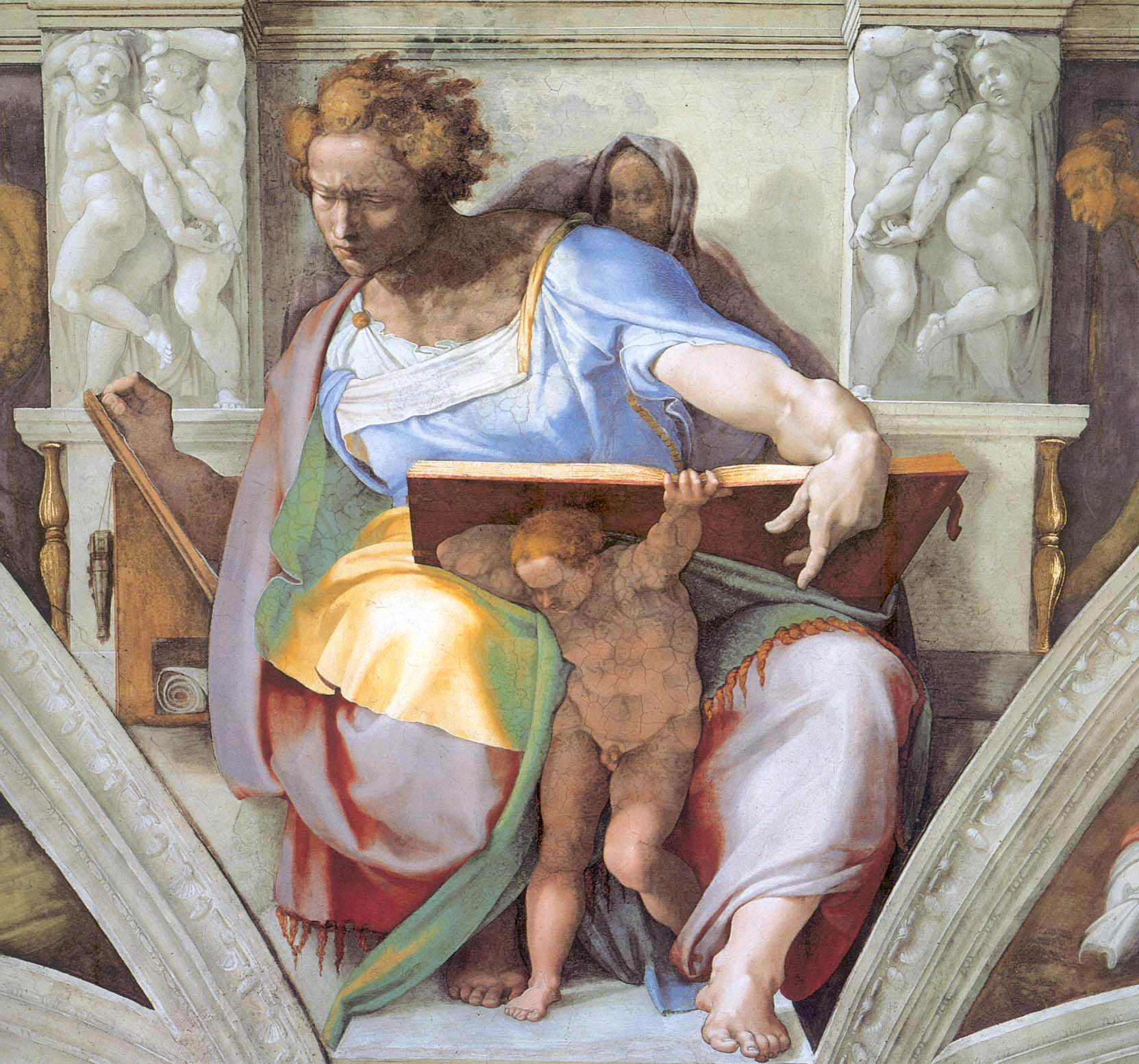
Daniel (fresco circa 1508–1512 by Michelangelo)

Rabbi Joshua ben Levi said that the men of the Great Assembly were so called because they restored the crown of the divine attributes—the enumeration of God's praise—to its ancient completeness. For in Deuteronomy 10:17, Moses called God "the great, the mighty, and the awesome." Then when Jeremiah saw foreigners despoiling the Temple, he asked where God's awesome deeds were, and thus in Jeremiah 32:18, he omitted "awesome." And then when Daniel saw foreigners enslaving the Israelites, he asked where God's mighty deeds were, and thus in Daniel 9:4, he omitted the word "mighty." But the men of the Great Assembly came and said that these circumstances showed God's mighty deeds, because God suppressed God's wrath, extending longsuffering to the wicked. And these circumstances showed God's awesome powers, for but for the fear of God, how could the single nation of Israel survive among the many nations. The Gemara asked how Jeremiah and Daniel could alter words established by Moses. Rabbi Eleazar said that since Jeremiah and Daniel knew that God insists on truth, they did not want to ascribe false attributions to God.

Rabbi Eliezer the Great taught that the Torah warns against wronging a stranger in 36, or others say 46, places (including Deuteronomy 10:17–19). The Gemara went on to cite Rabbi Nathan's interpretation of Exodus 22:20, "You shall neither wrong a stranger, nor oppress him; for you were strangers in the land of Egypt," to teach that one must not taunt one's neighbor about a flaw that one has oneself. The Gemara taught that thus a proverb says: If there is a case of hanging in a person's family history, do not say to the person, "Hang up this fish for me."

Reading the words, "love the stranger, in giving him food and clothing," in Deuteronomy 10:18, Akilas the proselyte asked Rabbi Eliezer whether food and clothing constituted all the benefit of conversion to Judaism. Rabbi Eliezer replied that food and clothing are no small things, for in Genesis 28:20, Jacob prayed to God for "bread to eat, and clothing to put on," while God comes and offers it to the convert on a platter. Akilas then visited Rabbi Joshua, who taught that "bread" refers to the Torah (as in Proverbs 9:5, Wisdom—the Torah—says, "Come, eat of my bread"), while "clothing" means the Torah scholar's cloak. A person privileged to study the Torah is thus privileged to perform God's precepts. Moreover, converts' daughters could marry into the priesthood, so that their descendants could offer burnt offerings on the altar. The midrash offered another interpretation: "Bread" refers to the showbread, while "clothing" refers to the priestly vestments. The midrash offered yet another interpretation: "Bread" refers to challah, while "clothing" refers to the first shearings of the sheep, both of which belong to the priests.

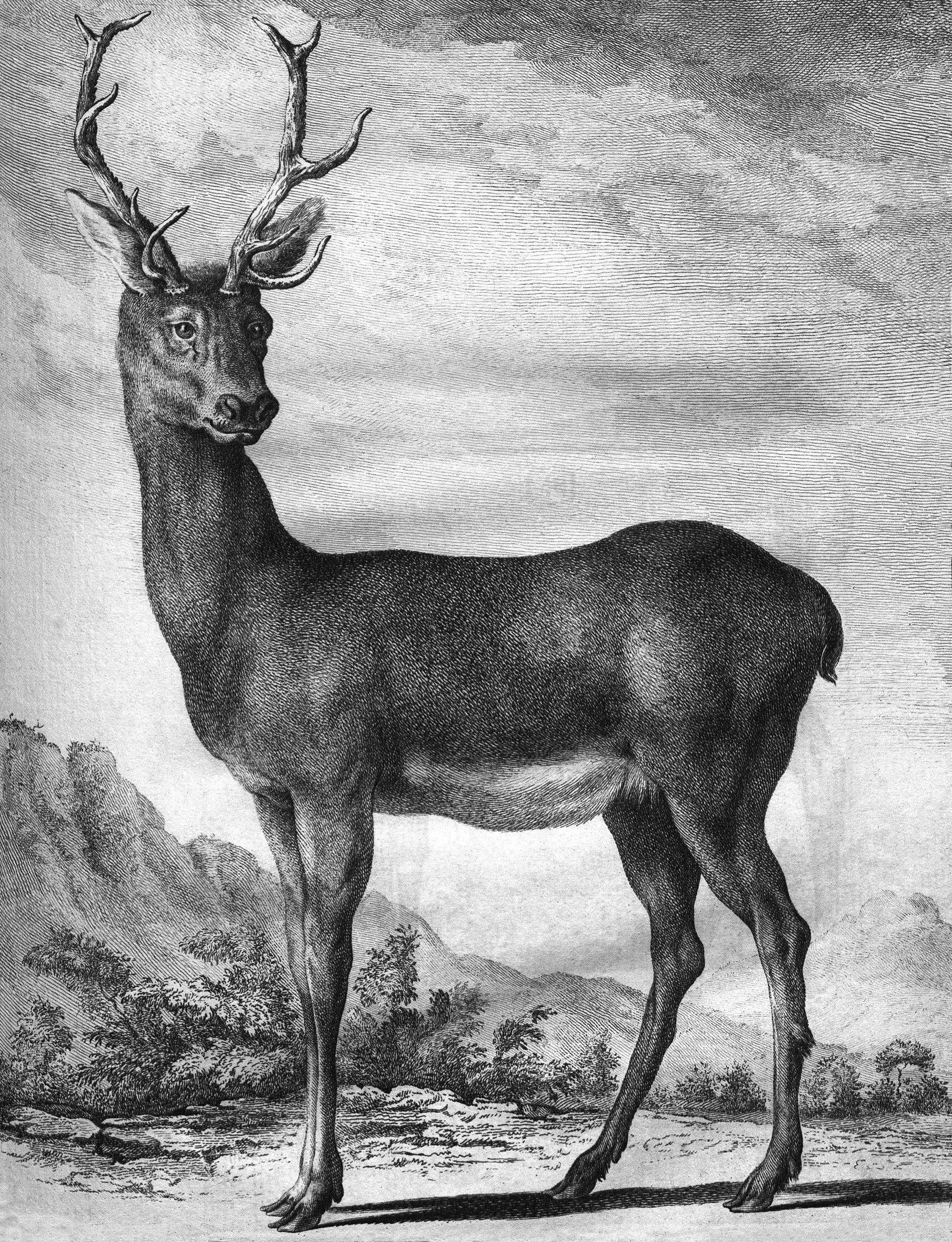
A Stag (from the 1756 Illustrations de Histoire naturelle générale et particulière avec la description du cabinet du roy)

A midrash read Deuteronomy 10:19 to say, "Love therefore the convert," and read it together with Psalm 146:8–9, which the midrash read as, "The Lord loves the righteous; the Lord preserves the converts." The midrash taught that God loves those who love God, and thus God loves the righteous, because their worth is due neither to heritage nor to family. The midrash compared God's great love of converts to a king who had a flock of goats, and once a stag came in with the flock. When the king was told that the stag had joined the flock, the king felt an affection for the stag and gave orders that the stag have good pasture and drink and that no one beat him. When the king's servants asked him why he protected the stag, the king explained that the flock have no choice, but the stag did. The king accounted it as a merit to the stag that had left behind the whole of the broad, vast wilderness, the abode of all the beasts, and had come to stay in the courtyard, in like manner, God provided converts with special protection, for God exhorted Israel not to harm them, as Deuteronomy 10:19 says, "Love therefore the convert," and Exodus 23:9 says, "And a convert shall you not oppress."

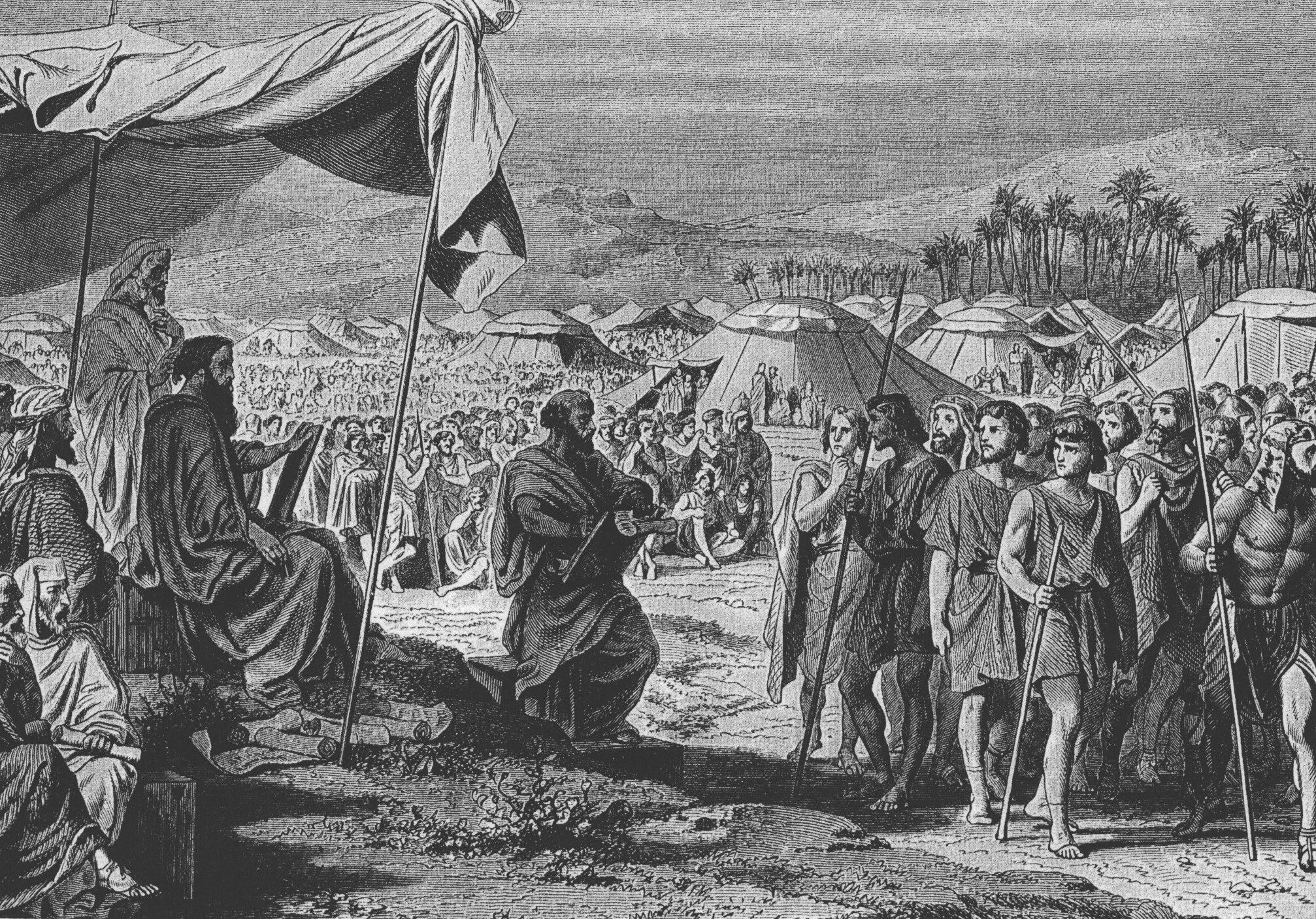
The Numbering of the Israelites (19th-century engraving by Henri Félix Emmanuel Philippoteaux)

The Gemara deduced from Deuteronomy 10:20 that it is a positive commandment to fear God.

A midrash taught that the Israelites were counted on ten occasions: (1) when they went down to Egypt (as reported in Deuteronomy 10:22), (2) when they went up out of Egypt, (3) at the first census in Numbers, (4) at the second census in Numbers, (5) once for the banners, (6) once in the time of Joshua for the division of the Land of Israel, (7) once by Saul, (8) a second time by Saul, (9) once by David, and (10) once in the time of Ezra.

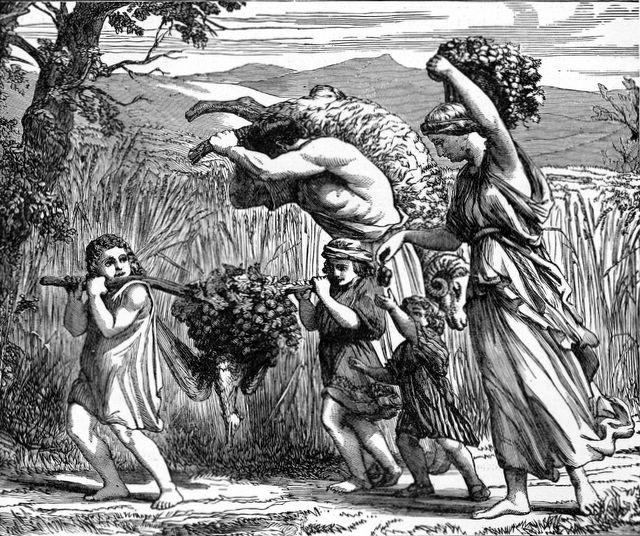
A Land Flowing with Milk and Honey (illustration from Henry Davenport Northrop's 1894 Treasures of the Bible)

=== Deuteronomy chapter 11 ===
The Gemara reported a number of Rabbis' accounts of how the Land of Israel did indeed flow with "milk and honey," as described in Exodus 3:8 and 17, 13:5, and 33:3, Leviticus 20:24, Numbers 13:27 and 14:8; and Deuteronomy 6:3; 11:9; 26:9, 15; 27:3; and 31:20. Once when Rami bar Ezekiel visited Bnei Brak, he saw goats grazing under fig trees while honey was flowing from the figs, and milk dripped from the goats mingling with the fig honey, causing him to remark that it was indeed a land flowing with milk and honey. Rabbi Jacob ben Dostai said that it is about three miles from Lod to Ono, and once he rose up early in the morning and waded all that way up to his ankles in fig honey. Resh Lakish said that he saw the flow of the milk and honey of Sepphoris extend over an area of sixteen miles by sixteen miles. Rabba bar bar Ḥana said that he saw the flow of the milk and honey in all the Land of Israel and the total area was equal to an area of twenty-two parasangs by six parasangs.

Already at the time of the Mishnah, Deuteronomy 11:13–21 constituted the second part of a standard Shema prayer that the priests recited daily, following Deuteronomy 6:4–9 and preceding Numbers 15:37–41. The first three chapters of tractate Berakhot in the Mishnah, Jerusalem Talmud, and Babylonian Talmud and the first two chapters of tractate Berakhot in the Tosefta interpreted the laws of reciting the Shema.

Rabbi Joshua ben Korhah taught that the Shema prayer puts Deuteronomy 6:4–9 before Deuteronomy 11:13–21 so that those who say the prayer should first accept upon themselves the yoke of Heaven's sovereignty and then take upon themselves the yoke of the commandments. And Deuteronomy 11:13–21 comes before Numbers 15:37–41 because Deuteronomy 11:13–21 applies both day and night (since it mentions all the commandments), whereas Numbers 15:37–41 is applicable only to the day (since it mentions only the precept of the fringes, which is not obligatory at night).

Reading Deuteronomy 11:13, "To love the Lord your God and to serve Him with all your heart," a baraita equated service of the heart with prayer. And that Deuteronomy 11:14 mentions rain immediately thereafter indicates that it is appropriate to pray for rain.

The Mishnah taught that the absence of one of the two portions of scripture in the mezuzah—Deuteronomy 6:4–8 and 11:13–21—invalidates the other, and indeed even one imperfect letter can invalidates the whole.

Discussions of the laws of the mezuzah in Deuteronomy 6:9 and 11:20 appear at Babylonian Talmud Menachot 31b–34b.

The Mishnah taught that the absence of one of the four portions of scripture in the Tefillin—Exodus 13:1–10 and 11–16 and Deuteronomy 6:4–8 and 11:13–21—invalidates the others, and indeed even one imperfect letter can invalidate the whole.

The Rabbis in a baraita questioned what was to be learned from the words of Deuteronomy 11:14: "And you shall gather in your corn and wine and oil." Rabbi Ishmael replied that since Joshua 1:8 says, "This book of the law shall not depart out of your mouth, but you shall meditate therein day and night," one might think that one must take this injunction literally (and study Torah every waking moment). Therefore, Deuteronomy 11:14 directs one to "gather in your corn," implying that one should combine Torah study with a worldly occupation. Rabbi Simeon ben Yohai questioned that, however, asking if a person plows in plowing season, sows in sowing season, reaps in reaping season, threshes in threshing season, and winnows in the season of wind, when would one find time for Torah? Rather, Rabbi Simeon ben Yohai taught that when Israel performs God's will, others perform its worldly work, as Isaiah 61:5–6 says, "And strangers shall stand and feed your flocks, aliens shall be your plowmen and vine-trimmers; while you shall be called ‘Priests of the Lord,' and termed ‘Servants of our God.'" And when Israel does not perform God's will, it has to carry out its worldly work by itself, as Deuteronomy 11:14 says, "And you shall gather in your corn." And not only that, but the Israelites would also do the work of others, as Deuteronomy 28:48 says, "And you shall serve your enemy whom the Lord will let loose against you. He will put an iron yoke upon your neck until He has wiped you out." Abaye observed that many had followed Rabbi Ishmael's advice to combine secular work and Torah study and it worked well, while others have followed the advice of Rabbi Simeon ben Yohai to devote themselves exclusively to Torah study and not succeeded. Rava would ask the Rabbis (his disciples) not to appear before him during Nisan (when corn ripened) and Tishrei (when people pressed grapes and olives) so that they might not be anxious about their food supply during the rest of the year.

Rav Judah taught in the name of Rav that one is forbidden to eat before giving food to one's animals, as Deuteronomy 11:15 says, "And I will give grass in your fields for your cattle," and only after that does Deuteronomy 11:15 say, "you shall eat and be satisfied."

The Mekhilta of Rabbi Ishmael deduced from Deuteronomy 11:16–17, "Take heed to yourselves, lest your heart be deceived . . . and the anger of the Lord be kindled against you," that the Land of Israel was one of three things given conditionally—along with the Temple and the kingdom of David—but thus excepting the Torah and the covenant with Aaron, which were unconditional.

The Rabbis taught in a baraita that Deuteronomy 11:18 says of the Torah, "So you fix (וְשַׂמְתֶּם, ve-samtem) these My words in your heart and in your soul." The Rabbis taught that one should read the word samtem rather as sam tam (meaning "a perfect remedy"). The Rabbis thus compared the Torah to a perfect remedy. The Rabbis compared this to a man who struck his son a strong blow, and then put a compress on the son's wound, telling his son that so long as the compress was on his wound, he could eat and drink at will, and bathe in hot or cold water, without fear. But if the son removed the compress, his skin would break out in sores. Even so, did God tell Israel that God created the Evil Inclination (יֵצֶר הַרַע, yetzer hara), but also created the Torah as its antidote. God told Israel that if they occupied themselves with the Torah, they would not be delivered into the hand of the Evil Inclination, as Genesis 4:7 says: "If you do well, shall you not be exalted?" But if Israel did not occupy themselves with the Torah, they would be delivered into the hand of the Evil Inclination, as Genesis 4:7 says: "sin couches at the door." Moreover, the Rabbis taught, the Evil Inclination is altogether preoccupied to make people sin, as Genesis 4:7 says: "and to you shall be his desire." Yet if one wishes, one can rule over the Evil Inclination, as Genesis 4:7 says: "and you shall rule over him." The Rabbis taught in a baraita that the Evil Inclination is hard to bear, since even God its Creator called it evil, as in Genesis 8:21, God says, "the desire of man's heart is evil from his youth." Rav Isaac taught that a person's Evil Inclination renews itself against that person daily, as Genesis 6:5 says, "Every imagination of the thoughts of his heart was only evil every day." And Rabbi Simeon ben Levi (or others say Rabbi Simeon ben Lakish) taught that a person's Evil Inclination gathers strength against that person daily and seeks to slay that person, as Psalm 37:32 says, "The wicked watches the righteous, and seeks to slay him." And if God were not to help a person, one would not be able to prevail against one's Evil Inclination, for as Psalm 37:33 says, "The Lord will not leave him in his hand."

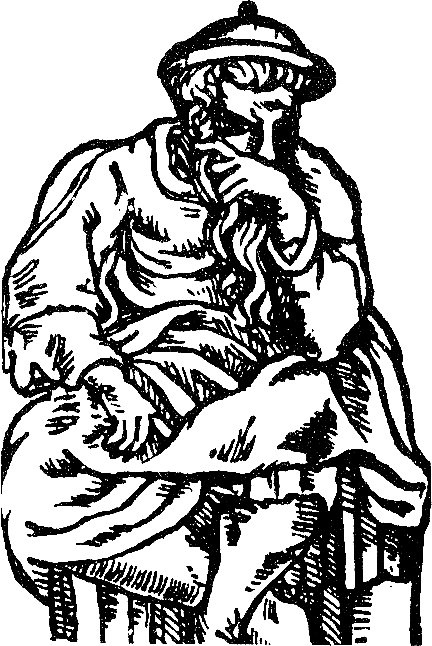
Akiva

Rabbi Tarfon, Rabbi Akiva, and Rabbi Jose the Galilean were reclining at a meal in the house of Aris in Lydda when the question was presented to them of which is more important, learning or action. Rabbi Tarfon said action, Rabbi Akiva said learning, and then all responded that learning is more important, for learning brings about action. Rabbi Jose the Galilean argued that learning is more important, for the religious duty to learn the Torah came before the religious duty to separate dough–offering by 40 years, the obligation to separate tithes by 44 years, the obligation of the years of release by 61 years, and the obligation of the Jubilee Year by 103 years. And the Sifre taught that just as a more severe penalty pertains to neglect of learning than to neglect of doing required deeds, so a more abundant reward attaches to learning than to the doing of required deeds, for Deuteronomy 11:19 says, "And you shall teach them your children, talking of them," and Deuteronomy 11:21 follows immediately, saying, "That your days may be multiplied, and the days of your children."

Rabban Gamaliel cited Deuteronomy 11:21 as an instance where the Torah alludes to life after death. The Gemara related that sectarians asked Rabban Gamaliel where Scripture says that God will resurrect the dead. Rabban Gamaliel answered them from the Torah, the Prophets (נְבִיאִים, Nevi'im), and the Writings (כְּתוּבִים, Ketuvim), yet the sectarians did not accept his proofs. From the Torah, Rabban Gamaliel cited Deuteronomy 31:16, "And the Lord said to Moses, ‘Behold, you shall sleep with your fathers and rise up [again].'" But the sectarians replied that perhaps Deuteronomy 31:16 reads, "and the people will rise up." From the Prophets, Rabban Gamaliel cited Isaiah 26:19, "Your dead men shall live, together with my dead body shall they arise. Awake and sing, you who dwell in the dust: for your dew is as the dew of herbs, and the earth shall cast out its dead." But the sectarians rejoined that perhaps Isaiah 26:19 refers to the dead whom Ezekiel resurrected in Ezekiel 27. From the Writings, Rabban Gamaliel cited Song 7:9, "And the roof of your mouth, like the best wine of my beloved, that goes down sweetly, causing the lips of those who are asleep to speak." (As the Rabbis interpreted Song of Songs as a dialogue between God and Israel, they understood Song of Songs 7:9 to refer to the dead, whom God will cause to speak again.) But the sectarians rejoined that perhaps Song of Songs 7:9 means merely that the lips of the departed will move. For Rabbi Joḥanan said that if a legal ruling is said in any person's name in this world, the person's lips speak in the grave, as Song of Songs 7:9 says, "causing the lips of those that are asleep to speak." Thus, Rabban Gamaliel did not satisfy the sectarians until he quoted Deuteronomy 11:21, "which the Lord swore to your fathers to give to them." Rabban Gamaliel noted that God swore to give the land not "to you" (the Israelites whom Moses addressed) but "to them" (the Patriarchs, who had long since died). Others say that Rabban Gamaliel proved it from Deuteronomy 4:4, "But you who did cleave to the Lord your God are alive every one of you this day." And (the superfluous use of "this day" implies that) just as you are all alive today, so shall you all live again in the World To Come.

A midrash asked to which commandment Deuteronomy 11:22 refers when it says, "For if you shall diligently keep all this commandment that I command you, to do it, to love the Lord your God, to walk in all His ways, and to cleave to Him, then will the Lord drive out all these nations from before you, and you shall dispossess nations greater and mightier than yourselves." Rabbi Levi said that "this commandment" refers to the recitation of the Shema Deuteronomy 6:4–9, but the Rabbis said that it refers to the Sabbath, which is equal to all the precepts of the Torah.

Interpreting the words "to walk in all His ways" in Deuteronomy 11:22, the Sifre taught that to walk in God's ways means to be (in the words of Exodus 34:6) "merciful and gracious." Similarly, Rabbi Ḥama, son of Rabbi Ḥanina, asked what Deuteronomy 13:5 means in the text, "You shall walk after the Lord your God." How can a human being walk after God, when Deuteronomy 4:24 says, "[T]he Lord your God is a devouring fire"? Rabbi Ḥama, son of Rabbi Ḥanina, explained that the command to walk after God means to walk after the attributes of God. As God clothes the naked—for Genesis 3:21 says, "And the Lord God made for Adam and for his wife coats of skin and clothed them"—so should we also clothe the naked. God visited the sick—for Genesis 18:1 says, "And the Lord appeared to him by the oaks of Mamre" (after Abraham was circumcised in Genesis 17:26)—so should we also visit the sick. God comforted mourners—for Genesis 25:11 says, "And it came to pass after the death of Abraham, that God blessed Isaac his son"—so should we also comfort mourners. God buried the dead—for Deuteronomy 34:6 says, "And He buried him in the valley"—so should we also bury the dead.

== In medieval Jewish interpretation ==
The parashah is discussed in these medieval Jewish sources:

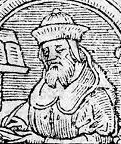
Rashi

=== Deuteronomy chapter 8 ===
Rashi read the words of Deuteronomy 8:2, "whether you would keep His commandments," to indicate that God was testing whether the Israelites would suspect God or question God's ways.

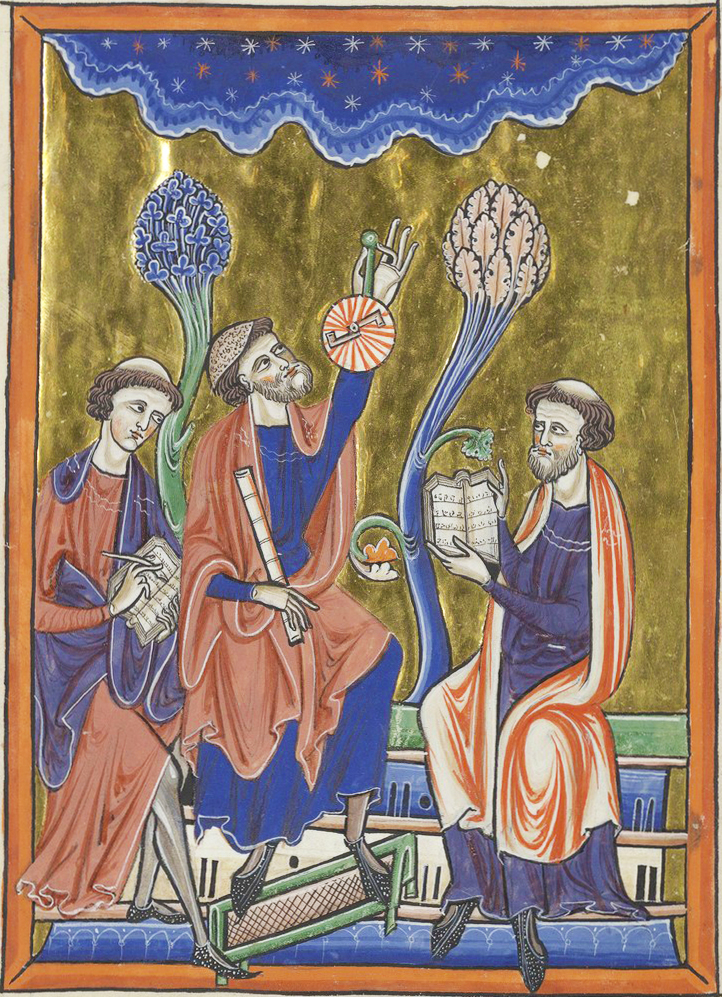
Ibn Ezra (with astrolabe)

Reading the words of Deuteronomy 8:2, "in order to afflict you," Rashbam noted that it is a form of affliction when one has no bread in one's basket, and one's life is dependent on bread arriving miraculously from heaven every day.

Baḥya ibn Paquda read Deuteronomy 8:3, "That He might make known to you that man does not live by bread alone," to teach that those who trust in God have their sustenance assured by any of the means available in the world.

Abraham ibn Ezra offered that the words of Deuteronomy 8:3, "and suffered you to hunger," might refer to before the coming of the manna, or, alternatively, that the manna itself afflicted the Israelites, because it was light and did not satisfy their desires. But Ibn Ezra rejected this explanation, arguing that the verse most probably refers to other desires that the Israelites could not fulfill in the wilderness.

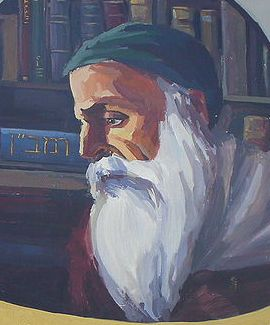
Naḥmanides

Ibn Ezra read Deuteronomy 8:5 to promise that God would reward the Israelites by bringing them into the Land, because they obeyed God, even though in order to chasten them, God afflicted them with thirst and hunger.

Reading "so the Lord your God chastens you" in Deuteronomy 8:5, Naḥmanides suggested that God afflicted the Israelites at first with the wilderness and the trial of the manna so that later the goodness of the Land and its fruits would be pleasing to them.

Reading Deuteronomy 8:10, "When you have eaten and are satiated, you shall bless God, your Lord," Maimonides taught that it is a positive commandment from the Torah to bless God after eating satisfying food. Maimonides taught that the Torah requires one to recite grace when one eats to the point of satiation, as implied by the language, "When you have eaten and are satiated, you shall bless." The Sages, however, ordained that one should recite grace after eating an amount of bread equal to the size of an olive.

Saadia Gaon read the words of Deuteronomy 8:13–14, "And your silver and your gold is multiplied, and all that you have is multiplied; then your heart be lifted up, and you forget the Lord your God," to teach that if all goes well and runs smoothly for those engaged in the accumulation of money, then they are apt to put their entire trust in money and forget to make mention of their Master and deny their Provider. Reading Deuteronomy 8:14, Hezekiah ben Manoah (the Hizkuni) lamented that the phenomenon of becoming haughty is tragically all too common. Reading Deuteronomy 8:14, Baḥya ben Asher taught that pride is the principal cause of forgetting essentials. Due to the abundance of affluence, peace, and tranquility, a person's heart can become haughty and smug, and the evil urge (יֵצֶר הַרַע, yetzer hara) can find it easy to provoke a person to follow the heart without restraint. When that happens, Heaven's concerns become marginal. In Deuteronomy 8:17, "and you say in your heart: ‘My strength and the power of my hand has gotten me this wealth,'" Baḥya ben Asher read Moses to warn of the possibility that arrogance can lead one to ascribe affluence to one's own lucky stars. And reading Deuteronomy 8:18, "you shall remember the Lord your God," Baḥya ben Asher taught that God alone is the Source of good fortune, because God has given people the strength to perform deeds of valor, and has handed people the power to overcome bad fortune in their stars. Abraham ibn Ezra read Moses to warn the Israelites in Deuteronomy 8:14 that they might forget that they were slaves with downcast hearts, forget the affliction and the hunger that they experienced in the wilderness, and forget that God sustained them nonetheless. But Ibn Ezra read the words "But you shall remember" in Deuteronomy 8:18 to teach that if the thought "My power and the might of my hand has gotten me this wealth" should enter one's mind, then one should remember the One Who gives one power.

Baḥya ibn Paquda read the words of Deuteronomy 8:16, "to benefit you in your end," to refer to the promise of compensation in the World To Come. Baḥya suggested that this principle, in turn, might provide one possible reason for why some righteous people are prevented from obtaining their livelihood without effort and must instead exert themselves for it and be tested by it.

Reading the words of Deuteronomy 8:18, "But you must remember the Lord your God, for it is He that gives you strength to make wealth, in order to establish His covenant which He swore to your forefathers, as it is this day," Baḥya ibn Paquda taught that people should not think that their livelihood depends on a particular means and that if those means fail, then their livelihood will not come from a different means. Rather, people should trust in God and know that all means are equal for God. God can provide using whatever means and at any time and however God wishes.

As the numeric value (gematria) of the word "power" (כֹּחַ, koach) in Deuteronomy 8:18 is 28, Jacob ben Asher (the Baal Ha-Turim) saw an allusion to Joshua, who led the Israelites for 28 years. And the Baal Ha-Turim saw a connection with the reference to Joshua in Numbers 27:16–17, "‘Let the Lord, the God of the spirits of all flesh, set a man over the congregation, who may go out before them, and who may come in before them, and who may lead them out, and who may bring them in; that the congregation of the Lord be not as sheep which have no shepherd,'" as those two verses contain 28 words in Hebrew.

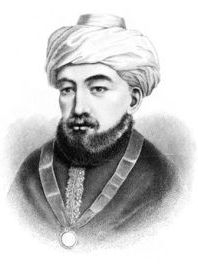
Maimonides

=== Deuteronomy chapter 10 ===
Maimonides read Deuteronomy 10:8, "At that time, God separated the tribe of Levi," to teach that God then singled out the Levites for service in the Sanctuary.

Maimonides and the siddur report that the Levites would recite the Psalm for the Day in the Temple.

Rashi taught that it was on the first day of Elul that God told Moses, in the words of Exodus 34:2, “In the morning you shall ascend Mount Sinai,” to receive the second tablets, and Moses spent 40 days there, as reported in Deuteronomy 10:10, "And I remained upon the mountain just as the first days." And on Yom Kippur, God was placated toward Israel and told Moses, in the words of Numbers 14:20, "I have forgiven, as you have spoken."

Citing Deuteronomy 10:12, 10:19, and 11:13, Baḥya ibn Paquda taught that to love God and to love the stranger are leading examples of a duties of the heart.

Reading the description of God by Moses in Deuteronomy 10:17–18, "For the Lord your God is God supreme and Lord supreme, the great, the mighty, and the awesome God, who . . . upholds the cause of the fatherless and the widow," Baḥya ibn Paquda argued we can see that God possesses these attributes from the evidence of God's deeds towards God's creations and from the wisdom and power that God's deeds reflect. But Baḥya cautioned that one must be careful not to take descriptions of God's attributes literally or in a physical sense. Rather, one must know that they are metaphors, geared to what we are capable of grasping with our powers of understanding, because of our urgent need to know God. But God is infinitely greater and loftier than all of these attributes.

Maimonides read Deuteronomy 10:20, "and you will cling to God," to set forth a positive commandment to cleave to the wise and their disciples to learn from their deeds. Maimonides reported that the Sages questioned whether it is possible for person to cling to the Divine Presence (as Deuteronomy 10:20 seems to command). They resolved this difficulty by interpreting this commandment to mean that one should cleave to the wise and their disciples. Therefore, Maimonides taught, one should try to marry into the family of a Torah Sage and encourage one's child to marry a Torah Sage, eat and drink with Sages, do business on behalf of Sages, and associate with them in all possible ways, as Deuteronomy 11:22 says "to cling to [God]." Similarly, the Sages directed, "Sit in the dust of their feet and drink in their words thirstily."

=== Deuteronomy chapter 11 ===
Maimonides cited Deuteronomy 11:13 to teach that it is a positive Torah commandment to pray every day, for Exodus 23:25 states: "You shall serve God, your Lord," and tradition teaches that this service is prayer, as Deuteronomy 11:13 says, "And serve Him with all your heart," and the Sages taught that the service of the heart is prayer.

== In modern interpretation ==
The parashah is discussed in these modern sources:

Shakespeare

=== Deuteronomy chapter 7 ===
Harold Fisch argued that William Shakespeare echoed the command of Deuteronomy 7:18, "you shall well remember," in the ghost's admonition to Prince Hamlet, "Remember me," in Hamlet 1:5:98.

Robert Oden taught that the idea that spoils of holy war were devoted to God (חֵרֶם, cherem) evident in Leviticus 27:28–29, Numbers 18:14, and Deuteronomy 7:26 was revelatory of (1) as "to the victor belong the spoils," then since God owned the spoils, then God must have been the victor and not any human being, and (2) the sacred and religiously obligatory nature of holy war, as participants gained no booty as a motivation for participation.

=== Deuteronomy chapter 8 ===
Moshe Alshich noted that Deuteronomy 8:14 appears to repeat Deuteronomy 8:11, "Be careful lest you forget the Lord your God." Alshich explained that the evil urge (יֵצֶר הַרַע, yetzer hara) works repetitively to subvert a person's character. The evil urge knows that it is easier to subvert successful people into believing in the success of their own efforts than to convince people of average means that they do not need God. Alshich taught that Deuteronomy 8:11–19 thus reflects the way that the evil urge works. The process of moving away from serving God can be gradual, almost imperceptibly slow. It can start not by failing to observe the commandments, but by failing to see them as God's will. Thus Deuteronomy 8:11 reflects that one can observe the commandments only for the sake of obtaining the reward that the Torah promises. Deuteronomy 8:12 reflects the next step that one might eat and be satisfied without giving credit to God. After this, as Deuteronomy 8:17 reports, one might give oneself credit for one's success. Still later, in Deuteronomy 8:19, one might give credit to idols. Moses thus warns against the insidious, indirect way that the evil urge attacks.

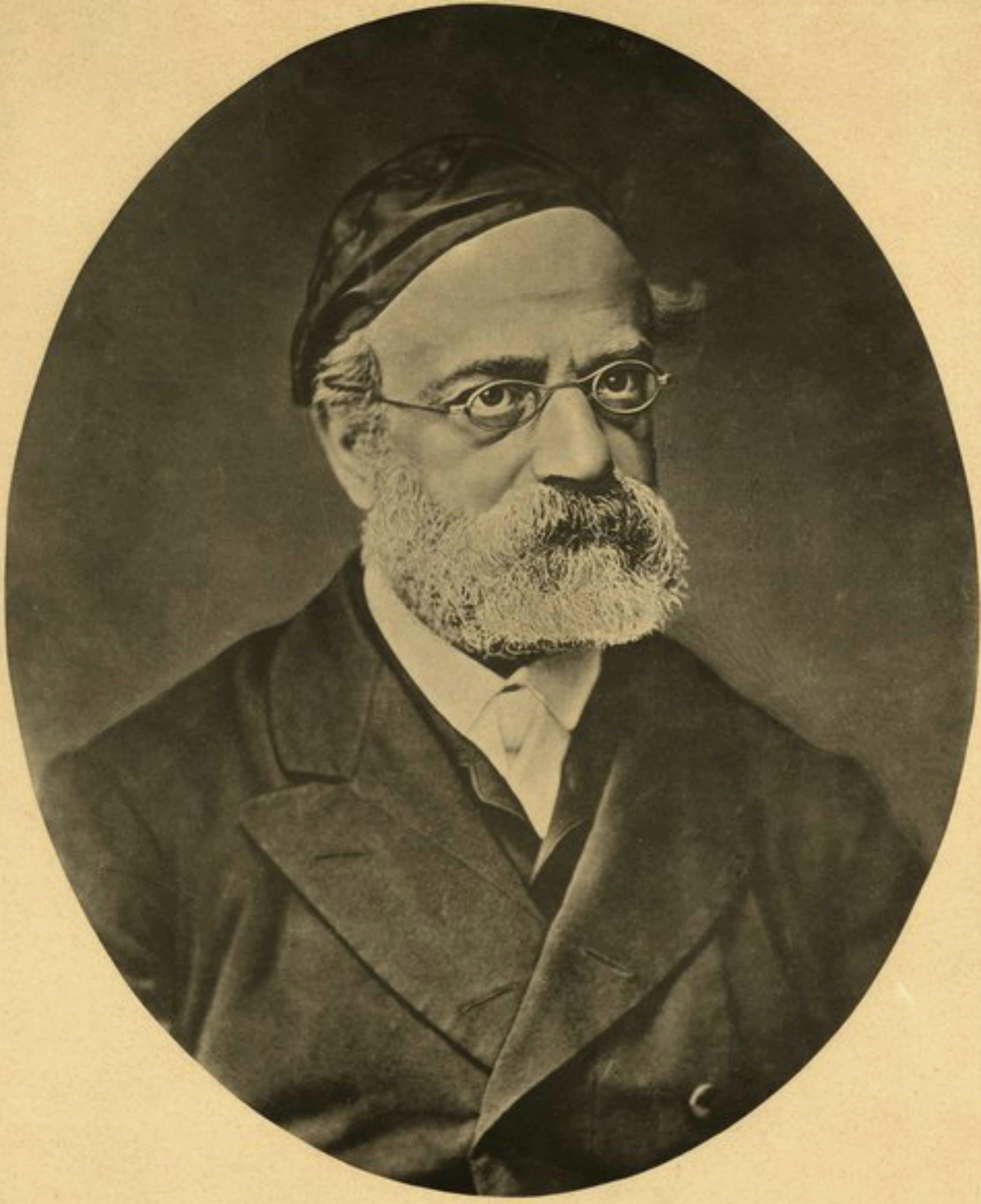
Hirsch

Rabbi Samson Raphael Hirsch read the word "power" (כֹּחַ, koach) in Deuteronomy 8:18 to comprehend everything that makes up one's creative personality and capacity to earn—intelligence, skill, foresight, health—and explained that this comes not from the food that one eats but directly from God. And the external circumstances that bring about success depend on God alone. Hirsch taught that the very smallest part of one's good fortune can be ascribed to one's own merit, and more is due to the merit of one's ancestors, whose virtues God rewards with their descendants' good fortune.

Reading Deuteronomy 8:11–18, Nechama Leibowitz wrote that people in their blindness tend to detect the guiding hand of Providence only when manifested in visible miracles, as the Israelites witnessed in the wilderness. People fail to see the hidden miracles performed for them continually when the world around them seems to be going on as usual. For this reason, the formulators of the liturgy obliged Jews to give thanks three times daily (in the final benedictions of the Amidah prayer) "for Your miracles that are with us every day and for Your wonders and Your bounties that are at all times, evening, morning, and noon."

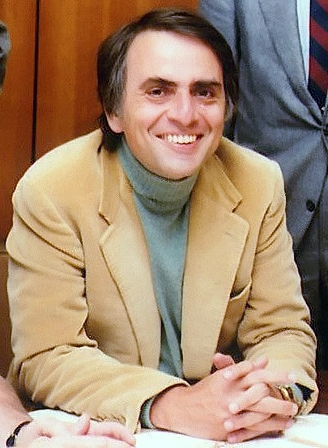
Sagan

=== Deuteronomy chapter 10 ===
In Deuteronomy 10:22, Moses reported that God had made the Israelites as numerous as the stars, echoing Genesis 15:5, in which God promised that Abraham's descendants would be as numerous as the stars of heaven, and Genesis 22:17, in which God promised that Abraham's descendants would be as numerous as the stars of heaven and the sands on the seashore. Carl Sagan reported that there are more stars in the universe than sands on all the beaches on the Earth.

=== Deuteronomy chapter 11 ===
Nathan MacDonald reported some dispute over the meaning of the description of the Land of Israel as a "land flowing with milk and honey," as in Exodus 3:8 and 17, 13:5, and 33:3, Leviticus 20:24, Numbers 13:27 and 14:8]; and Deuteronomy 6:3; 11:9; 26:9, 15; 27:3; and 31:20. MacDonald wrote that the term for milk (חָלָב, chalav) could easily be the word for "fat" (חֵלֶב, chelev), and the word for honey (דְבָשׁ, devash) could indicate not bees' honey but a sweet syrup made from fruit. The expression evoked a general sense of the bounty of the land and suggested an ecological richness exhibited in several ways, not just with milk and honey. MacDonald noted that the expression was always used to describe a land that the people of Israel had not yet experienced, and thus characterized it as always a future expectation.

Donald Englert suggested that "water with your foot" in Deuteronomy 11:10 may have been a euphemism for urination.

Walter Brueggemann argued that the "if-then" structure of Deuteronomy 11:13–17, a trademark rhetorical feature of the Deuteronomic tradition, makes clear that the gift of the land was not an automatic given but a consequence of obedience. The double "if-then" of Deuteronomy 11:13–17 linked land and obedience, making the gift of the land conditional. First, Deuteronomy 11:13–15 says the positive "if-then"—stating the "if" of obedience in familiar cadences bespeaking total commitment in two standard verbs ("love" and "serve") plus the formula from the Shema in Deuteronomy 6:4. The "then," the consequence of obedience, is abundant rain in every season that will cause the land to produce everything needed, made explicit through three phrases—first, "grain, wine, oil," a common triad to signal a rich, productive economy (see Hosea 2:8, 22]); second, the pasture land for cattle on which the agrarian economy depended (see Psalms 50:10, 104:14); and third, the rhetoric of satiation from Deuteronomy 6:11. Then Deuteronomy 11:16–17 follows with the negative "if-then"—the "if" being the nullification in Deuteronomy 11:16 of the Shema of Deuteronomy 6:4, the compromise of covenantal identity by embracing other gods who seem better at giving rain while making lesser demands. And the negative "then" being drought, as rain is God's gift (see Job 38:25–30; Leviticus 26:19–20; Deuteronomy 28:23–24; Amos 4:7–8; and Psalm 107:35–38). Brueggemann wrote that because of the urgency of obedience, Deuteronomy 11:18–21 returns to the educational accent of Deuteronomy 6:4–9, urging the internalizing of passionate covenantal conviction among the young through the mandate to produce signs, emblems, conversations, and marked doorposts and gates.

== Commandments ==
According to Sefer ha-Chinuch, there are 6 positive and 2 negative commandments in the parashah.

- Not to derive benefit from any ornamentation of an idol
- Not to take any object from idolatry into our possession, to derive benefit from it
- The precept of blessing the Almighty for the food we receive
- The precept of love for converts to Judaism
- The precept of reverent awe for the Eternal Lord
- The precept of prayer to the Almighty
- The mitzvah of associating with Torah scholars and adhering to them
- That whoever needs to take an oath should swear by the Name of the Eternal Lord

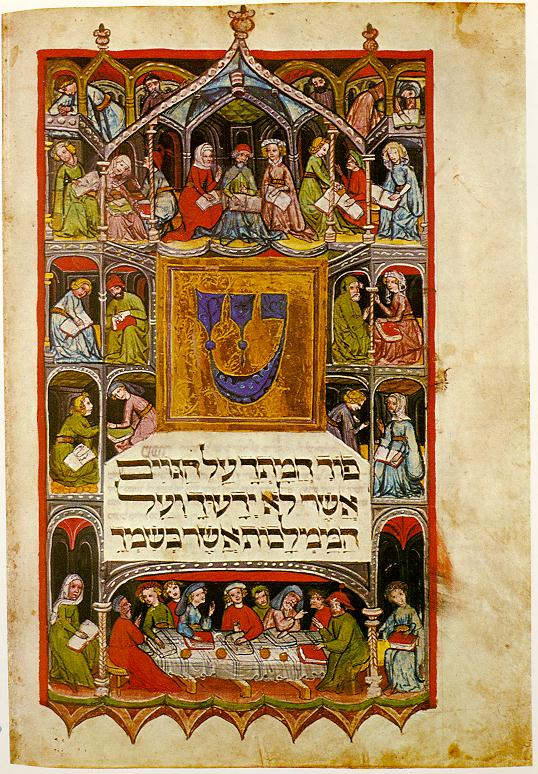
A page from a 14th-century German Haggadah

== In the liturgy ==
In the Blessing after Meals (Birkat Hamazon), Jews sometimes quote Deuteronomy 8:10, the Scriptural basis for the Blessing after Meals, immediately before the invitation (zimun), and quote it again at the close of the second blessing (for the Land of Israel).

The opening sentence of the Amidah prayer quotes Moses's characterization of God in Deuteronomy 10:17 as "the great, the mighty, and the awesome."

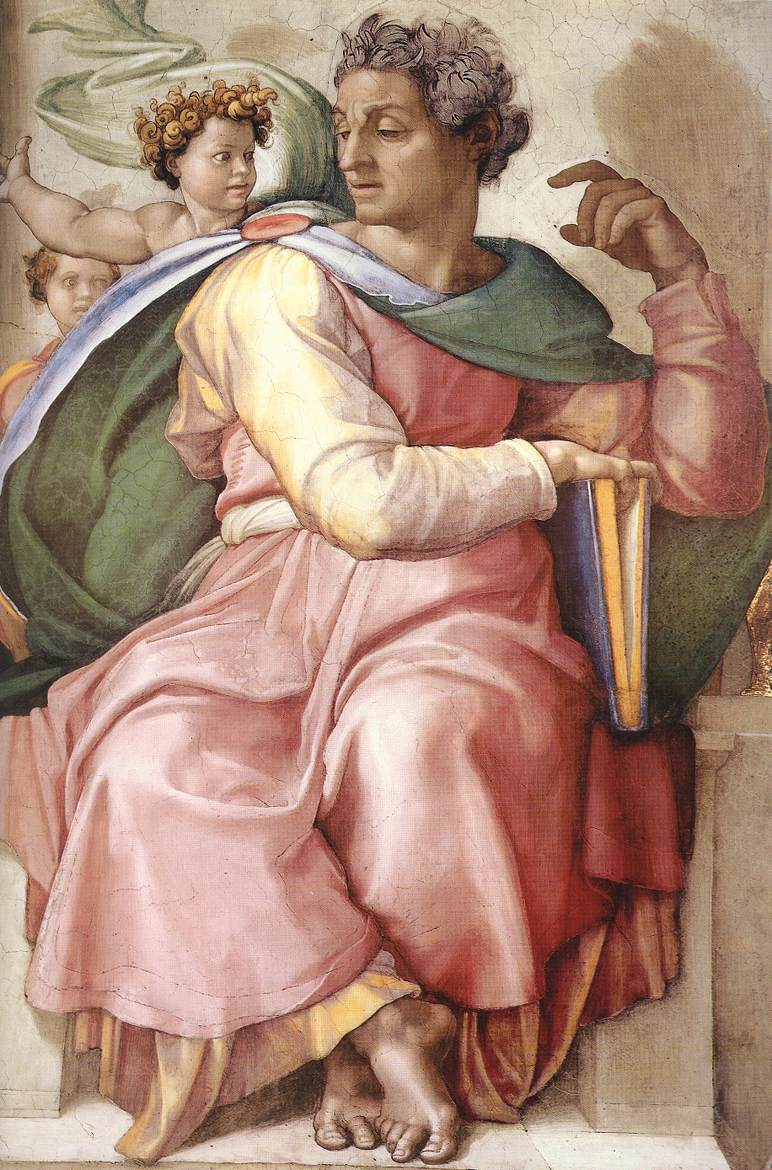
Isaiah (1509 fresco by Michelangelo)

The Passover Haggadah, in the magid section of the Seder, quotes Deuteronomy 10:22.

Deuteronomy 11:13–21 is the second of three blocks of verses in the Shema, a central prayer in Jewish prayer services. Jews combine Deuteronomy 6:4–9, Deuteronomy 11:13–21, and Numbers 15:37–41 to form the core of K'riat Shema, recited in the evening (מעריב, Ma'ariv) and morning (שַחֲרִת, Shacharit) prayer services.

== Haftarah ==
The haftarah for the parashah is Isaiah 49:14–51:3. The haftarah is the second in the cycle of seven haftarot of consolation after Tisha B'Av, leading up to Rosh Hashanah.
