= Kibroth Hattaavah =

Location described in the Book of Numbers

Coordinates: 28°55′N 34°29′E

Kibroth Hattaavah or Kibroth-hattaavah (Biblical Hebrew: קִבְרוֹת הַתַּאֲוָה, romanized: qib̲rot̲ hattaʾăwā, lit. 'graves of craving') is one of the locations which the Israelites passed through during the Exodus as recorded in the Book of Numbers (Numbers 11:1-3). It was at this place, according to the biblical narrative, that the Israelites loudly complained about constantly eating only manna, and that they had enjoyed a much more varied diet of fish, vegetables, fruit and meat when they lived in Egypt; the text states that this led Moses, in despair, to cry out to Yahweh, who then promised them so much meat that "they would vomit it through their nostrils" in Numbers 11:18–20. The narrative tells of a huge number of quail brought by the winds to both sides of the Israelite encampment, which the people gathered. Modern translations imply that Yahweh sent a plague as they were chewing the first meat that fell.

The biblical narrative argues that the name Kibroth-hattaavah derives from these events, since the plague killed the people who "lusted after" meat, who were then buried there. According to biblical scholars, this is merely an aetiological myth to theologically justify a pre-existing place name; several biblical scholars have proposed that the term "graves" in the name refers to a stone circle or cairns, or to recently discovered Chalcolithic (~fourth Millennium BC) megalithic burial sites known as nawamis "mosquitoes," which are unique to the central Sinai Peninsula and southern Negev.

According to textual scholars of the documentary hypothesis, the account concerning Kibroth-hattaavah is part of the Yahwist text and occurs at the same point in the Exodus narrative as the account of Taberah in the Elohist text; indeed, one or both of Tabarah (תבערה) and Hattavah (התאוה) may be phonological and typographical corruptions of the same original word. Taberah is not listed in the Stations of the Exodus listed later in the Book of Numbers, with the people going straight from Mount Sinai to Kibroth-hattavah, and there is no hint that the Israelites had to travel from Taberah to Kibroth-hattaavah, implying that they were the same location. Nevertheless, Taberah and Kibroth-hattaavah are listed as different places by Deuteronomy 9:22 that textual scholars ascribe to the Deuteronomist, and consequently date to over two centuries later than the Yahwist and Elohist, and also later than the combined JE text.

Taberah is described by the Torah as being three days' journey from the biblical Mount Sinai and therefore its modern identification relies heavily on the identification of Mount Sinai. The traditional identification of Mount Sinai as one of the mountains at the southern tip of the Sinai Peninsula would imply that Taberah and Kibroth-hattaavah was/were probably in the Wadi Murrah, about 30 miles northeast of the southern tip, and precisely one day's journey from Ain Khudra Oasis. In this area, at Erweis el-Ebeirig, an ancient encampment has been found but it dates to the Early Bronze Age (the early third millennium BC).

== In culture ==
- In the 1858 boys' novel Eric, or, Little by Little certain unnamed "vile" activities (presumably masturbation) are referred back to Kibroth-Hattaavah: "Don't you remember Rowlands' sermon not two weeks ago on Kibroth-Hattaavah?"

== Bibliography ==
- Grant R. Jeffrey, The Signature of God, Pages 60–68, 132–135
