= Taberah =

According to the Book of Numbers, Taberah (Hebrew: תבערה) is one of the locations which the Israelites passed through during their Exodus journey. The biblical narrative states that the place received its name, which means the place of burning, because the fire of the LORD had burned there in anger because of their continued complaints. The text states that the fire first burned at the outskirts of the Israelite camp, killing some of those who lived on the edge of the group, but it was extinguished when Moses prayed on the people's behalf.

According to textual scholars, the account concerning Taberah is part of the Elohist text, and occurs at the same point in the Exodus narrative as the account of Kibroth Hattaavah in the Jahwist text; indeed, one or both of Tabarah (תבערה) and Hattavah (התאוה) may be phonological and typographical corruptions of the same original word. Taberah is not listed in the full stations list later in the Book of Numbers, with the people going straight from Mount Sinai to Kibroth-hattavah, and there is no hint that the Israelites had to travel from Taberah to Kibroth-hattaavah, implying that they were the same location; nevertheless, Taberah and Kibroth-hattaavah are listed as different places by a passage in Deuteronomy, which textual scholars ascribe to the deuteronomist, and consequently date to over two centuries later than the Jahwist and Elohist, and also later than the combined JE text.

Taberah is described by the Torah as being three days' journey from Mount Sinai, and therefore its modern identification relies heavily on the identification of Mount Sinai. The traditional identification of Mount Sinai as one of the mountains at the southern tip of the Sinai Peninsula would imply that Taberah and Kibroth-hattaavah was/were probably in the Wadi Murrah, about 30 miles north-east of the southern tip, and exactly a day's journey from 'Ain Hudherah. An ancient encampment has been found in this area, at the Erweis el-Ebeirig, but it dates to the Early Bronze Age (the early 3rd millennium BC). The traditional location of Mount Sinai has been rejected by the majority of scholars, as well as theologians, who favour a location at Mount Seir or in north western Saudi Arabia, Other writers have proposed locations in the Negev, or the central or northern Sinai desert.
