= Agriculture in Israel =

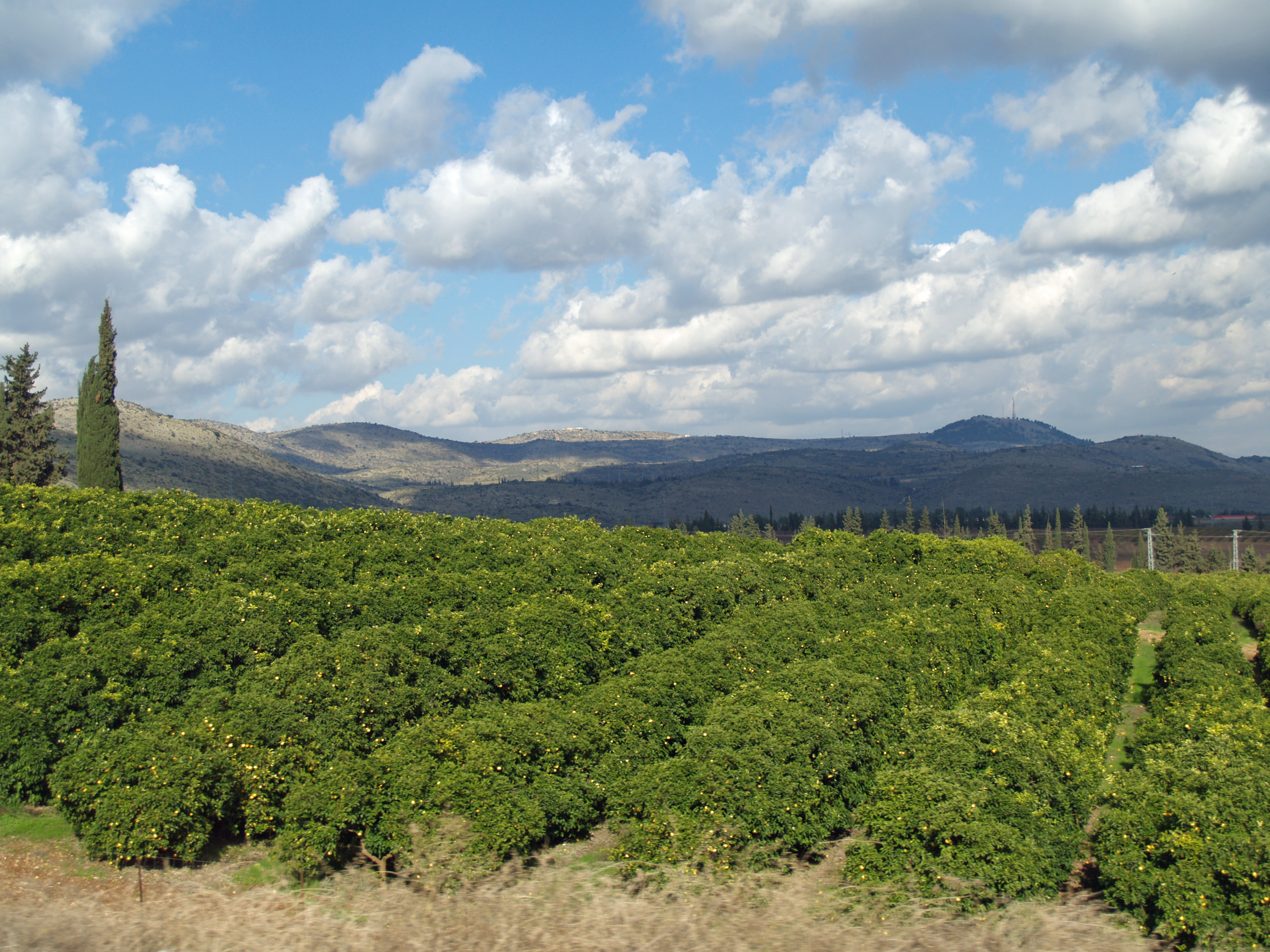
Galilee lemon grove

Agriculture in Israel is a highly developed industry. Israel is an exporter of fresh produce and a leader in agricultural technologies. The southern half of Israel is desert and irrigation is required for growing crops. The northern half is more conducive to rain-fed agriculture. According to the World Bank, 29.7 percent of Israel is agricultural land. The shortage of water is a constraint. In 2008, agriculture represented 2.5% of total GDP and 3.6% of exports. Israel is not self-sufficient in growing food. In 2021, Israel's agricultural imports totaled $8.79b and agricultural exports totaled $2.45b. Grains, oilseeds, meat, coffee, cocoa, and sugar were among the imports.

Israel is home to two unique types of agricultural communities, the kibbutz and moshav, which developed as Jews immigrated to the land that became the State of Israel, and embarked on rural settlement. As of 2016, kibbutzim provided Israel with about 40% of its agricultural produce.

== History ==
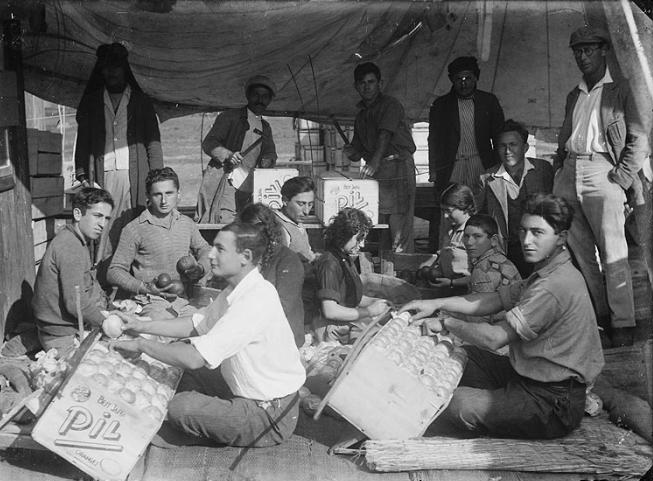
Citrus packing in Hadera before the establishment of Israel.

The development of modern agriculture was closely tied to the Zionist movement and Jewish immigration to Ottoman Syria beginning in the late nineteenth century. By 1900, Jewish sector owned 3.8% of all cultivated lands in Palestine. Jews mostly purchased land near the coast of the Mediterranean Sea. Most Palestinian Arabs lived in the highlands and were subsistence farmers growing wheat and barley on rainfed land. Both Jewish and Arab farmers initiated growing commercial and exportable crops such as citrus and vegetables in the late 19th century. The development of agriculture near the coast required drainage of swamps and eradication of malaria, but the land was "wonderfully rich and fertile". A 1943 survey concluded that 435,700 ha (1,077,000 acres) of land in Ottoman Syria (21st century Israel, Judea, Sumaria and Gaza) was cultivated and that 24.9 percent of the cultivated land was owned by Jews. Rain-fed cropland made up 91.7 percent of the total and 8.3 percent was irrigated.

The Jewish residents of the new country of Israel gained farmland when 700,000 Arab Palestinians abandoned their homes, left the country or were forced off land inside the borders of Israel in the period leading up to and during the 1948 Arab–Israeli War. By 2001, 56.5 percent of the cropland in Israel was irrigated. Since independence the production of export and commercial crops expanded while the acreage devoted to cultivation of wheat and barley declined.

Water shortage used to be a major problem. Rain falls between September and April, with an uneven distribution across the country, from 700 mm (28 in) in the north to less than 20 mm (1 in) in the south. Annual renewable water resources are about 160,000,000 cubic metres (5.6×10^{9} cu ft), 75% of which is used for agriculture. Most of Israel's freshwater sources have been consequently joined to the National Water Carrier of Israel; a network of pumping stations, reservoirs, canals and pipelines that transfers water from the north to the south. In recent years, Israel has invested heavily in seawater desalination. 80% of Israel’s fresh water is now made in 5 desalination plants. Israel now pumps water into Lake Kinneret, the largest freshwater source in Israel.

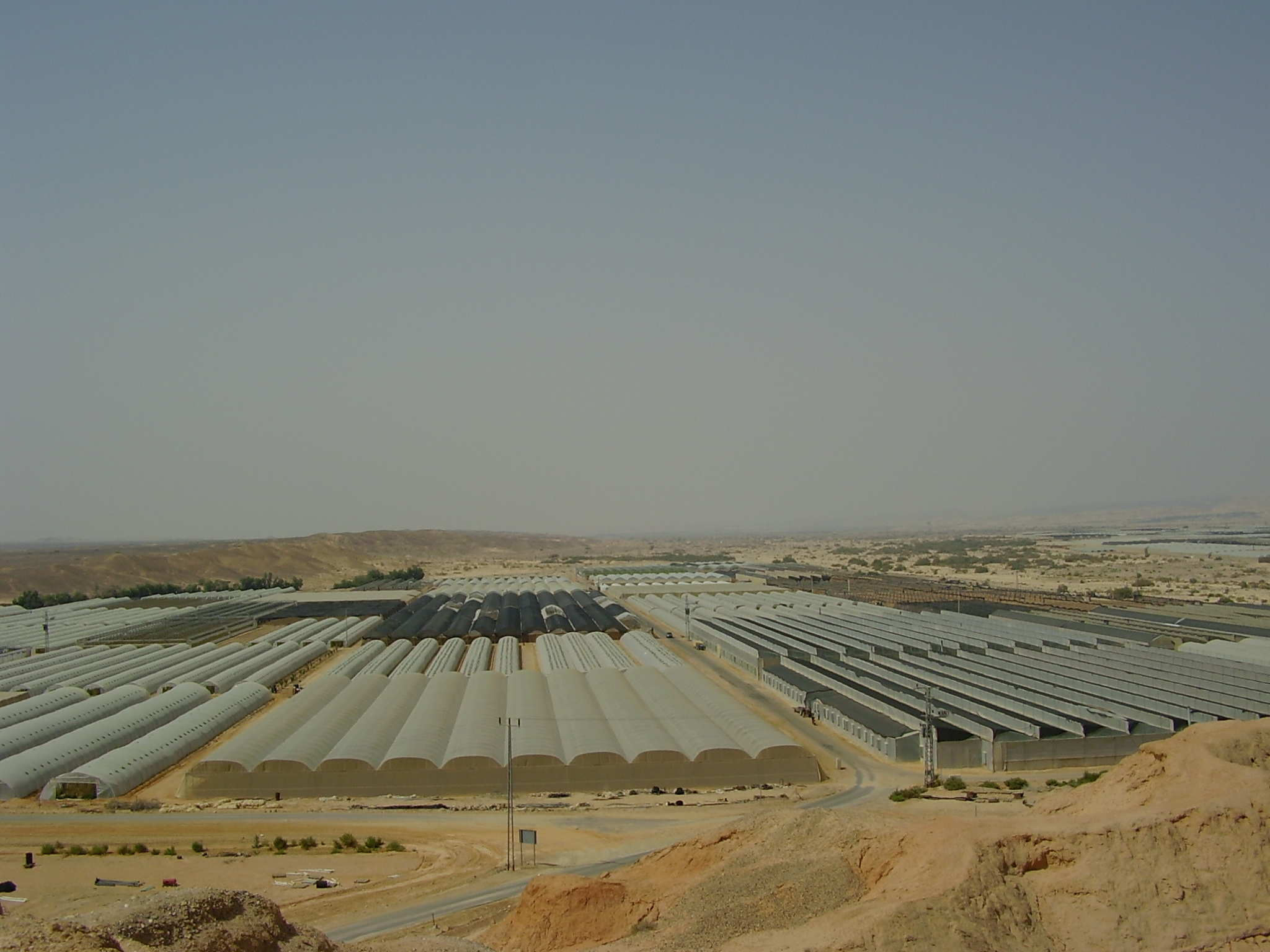
Ein Yahav hothouses

The share of agriculture in Israel’s GDP has steadily declined, falling from just under 6% in 1979 to 5.1% in 1985, and to about 2.5% in recent years. In 1995, there were 43,000 farm units with an average size of 13.5 hectares. 19.8% of these were smaller than 1 hectare, 75.7% were 1 to 9 hectares in size, 3.3% were between 10 and 49 hectares, 0.4% were between 50 and 190 hectares, and 0.8% were larger than 200 hectares. Of the 380,000 hectares under cultivation in 1995, 20.8% was under permanent cultivation and 79.2% under rotating cultivation. Farm units included 160,000 hectares used for activities other than cultivation. Cultivation was based mainly in the northern coastal plains, the hills of the interior, and the upper Jordan Valley.

In 2006, agricultural output fell by 0.6% following a 3.6% rise in 2005; inputs for 2007 rose by 1.2% excluding wages. Between 2004 and 2006, vegetables accounted for around 35% of total agricultural output. Flowers made up around 20%, field crops made up around 18%, fruits (other than citrus), around 15%, and citrus fruits around 10%. In 2006, 36.7% of agricultural output was for domestic consumption, 33.9% for domestic manufacturing, and 22% for direct export. In 2006, 33% of vegetables, 27% of flowers, 16% of field crops, 15.5% of fruits other than citrus, and 9% of citrus fruits were exported.

Israel is the sixteenth most water stressed country in the world

Israeli agricultural production rose 26% between 1999 and 2009, while the number of farmers dropped from 23,500 to 17,000. Farmers have also grown more with less water, using 12% less water to grow 26% more produce.

In 2022, Israel's Ministry of Agriculture and Rural Development announced a plan to increase the total number of agricultural lands cultivated, and to improve the labor force by supporting new farmers and farmers who have not worked in the field for at least seven years with a total of 10 million shekels.

After the 2023 Hamas-led attack on Israel, many farmers in Israel faced large scale losses due to international workers being killed, kidnapped and/or leaving the country. While numerous volunteers initiatives were assembled by organizations such as Taglit-Birthright and Hashomer Hachadash, many farmers were unsure of the long term implications for their farms. On 15 November, the Agriculture and Finance Ministries, the Knesset Finance committee, and the Israeli Farmers Association agreed on a proposition to compensate farmers for their losses, although as of 24 November it had not been fully finalized.

== Farm types ==
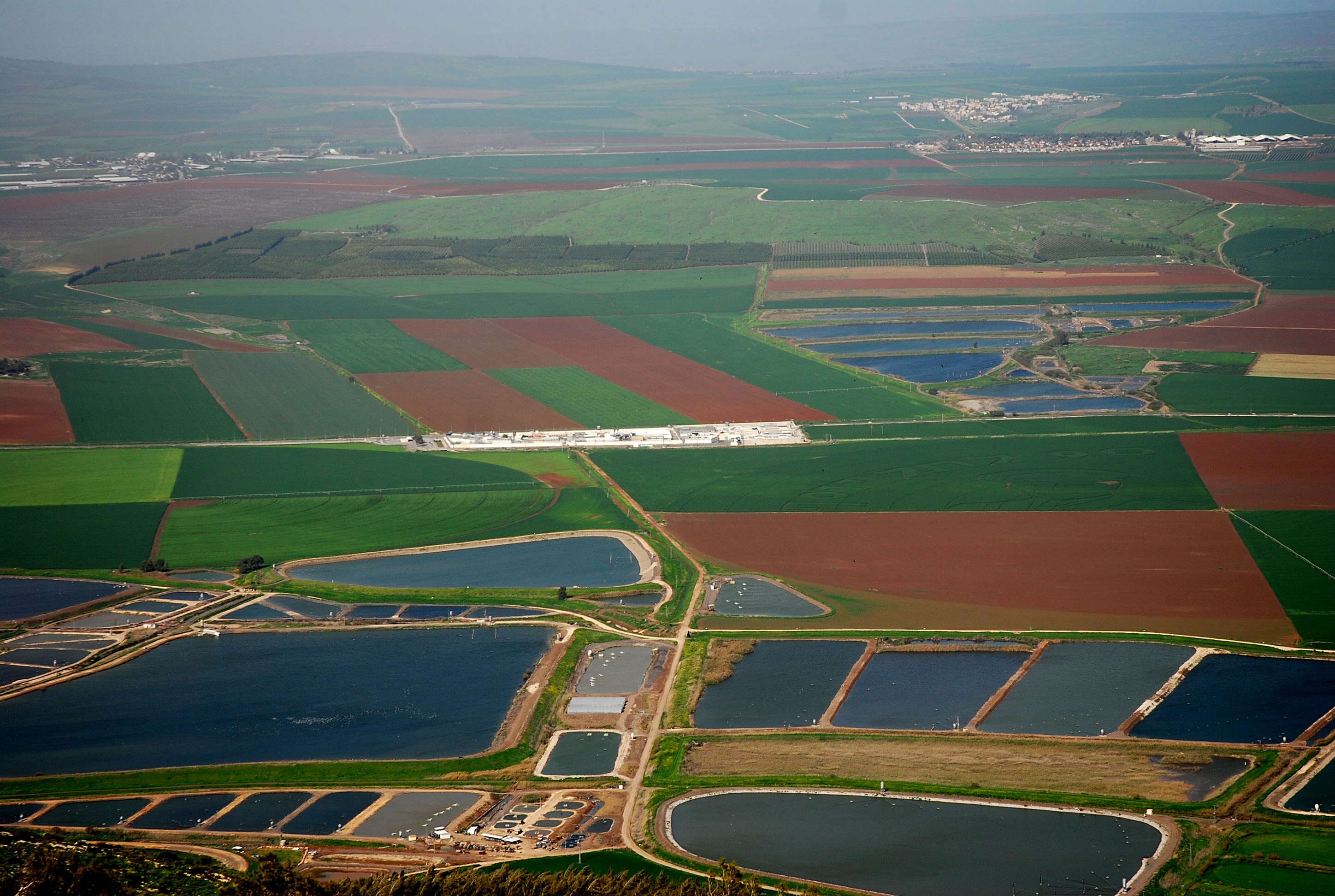
Fields in the Jezreel Valley.

Most of Israel's agriculture is based on cooperative principles that evolved in the early twentieth century. Two unique forms of agricultural settlements; the kibbutz, a collective community in which the means of production are communally owned and each member's work benefits all; and the moshav, a farming village where each family maintains its own household and works its own land, while purchasing and marketing are conducted co-operatively. Both communities provided a means not only to realise the dream of the pioneers to have rural communities based on social equality, co-operation and mutual aid but also to gain agricultural output in a productive means. Today, between kibbutzim and moshavim, 76% of the country's fresh produce is output, as well as many processed food products.

== Workers ==
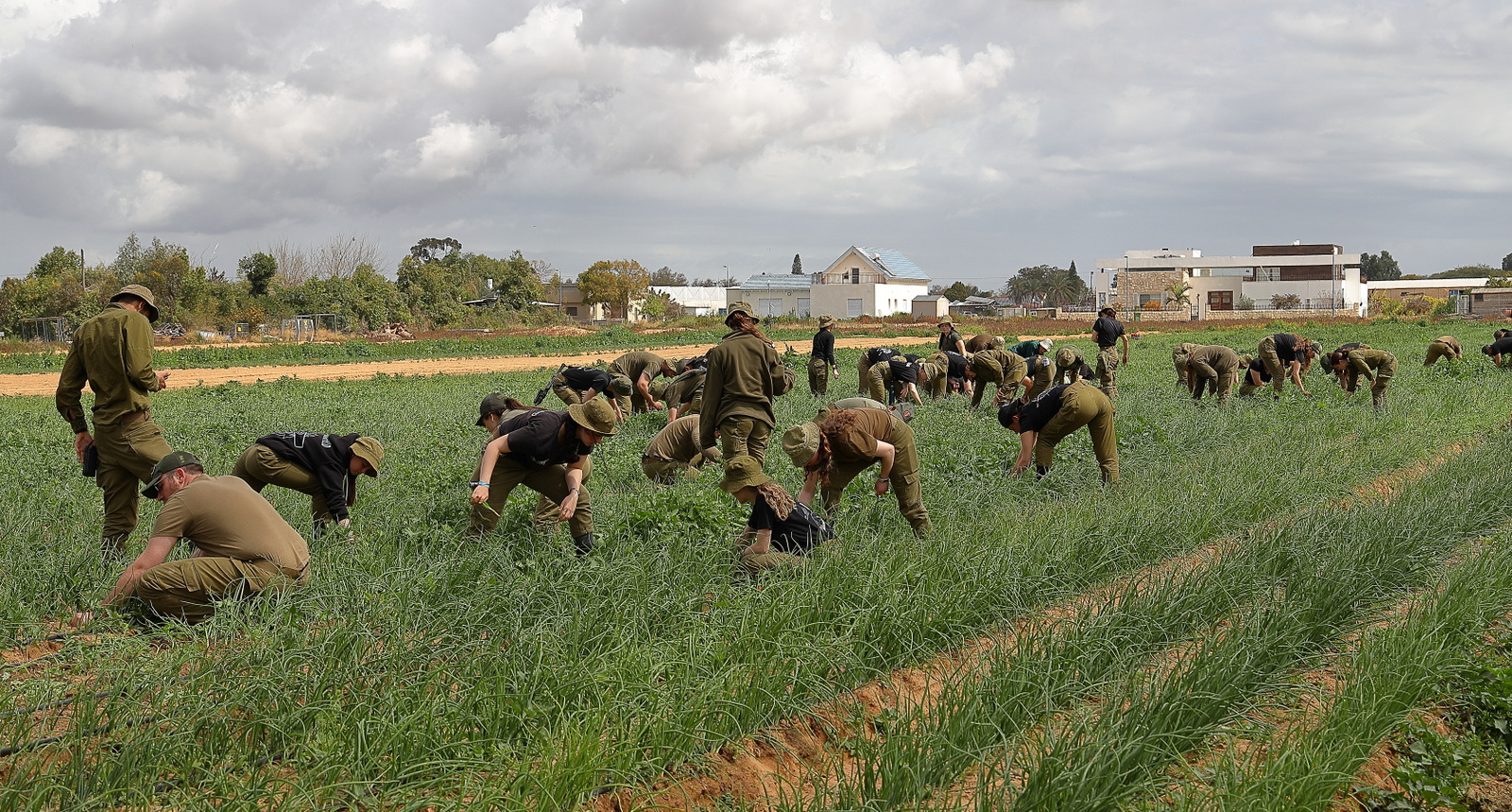
Cadets from the IDF officers course working in agriculture fields in Yated, Israel on 7 March 2024

Israeli farms relied mostly on Palestinian workers for additional labor up until the 1990s when, following the clashes of the First Intifada and the ensuing restriction on the movement of Palestinians from Gaza and the West Bank, Israel began to look at other areas for workers. A 2021 Knesset study relying on data compiled in 2020 found that about 75,200 people were employed in the agriculture sector with about 49% of them Israeli, 32% international and 19% Palestinians.

By 2023, there were between 30,000 and 40,000 Thai workers working in the Israeli agriculture sector, and were governed by strict rules, such as being unable to raise families in the country and short contracts. After the 7 October 2023 attacks by Hamas, many Thai nationals returned to their home country, due to many being killed and held hostage in the attacks. This created a vacuum that caused large losses for the farmers, and a large influx of about 20,000 workers from Sri Lanka that were expected to arrive to work on the farms in December 2023. In November 2023, the Malawi government made an arrangement by Israeli companies to ferry Malawian farm workers to work farms in Israel.

=== Migrant worker conditions ===
Israel's agricultural sector's heavy reliance on less expensive foreign and migrant laborers has led to accusations of exploitation. To combat these violations, the Israeli High Court ruled in 1991 that all Israeli Labor Laws shall apply to the foreign workforce; although execution of the law remains difficult. Problematic phenomena remain rampant and foreign worker continuously suffer from those such as black market laboring, sub-minimum wage, debt bondage, harsh, unsafe and inhumane work environment, human trafficking, false imprisonment, beatings, suicides and uninvestigated deaths. Sexual assault of foreign agriculture workers is common, a 2021 report found that 100% of surveyed Thai agriculture workers had been sexually assaulted.

== Agricultural produce ==
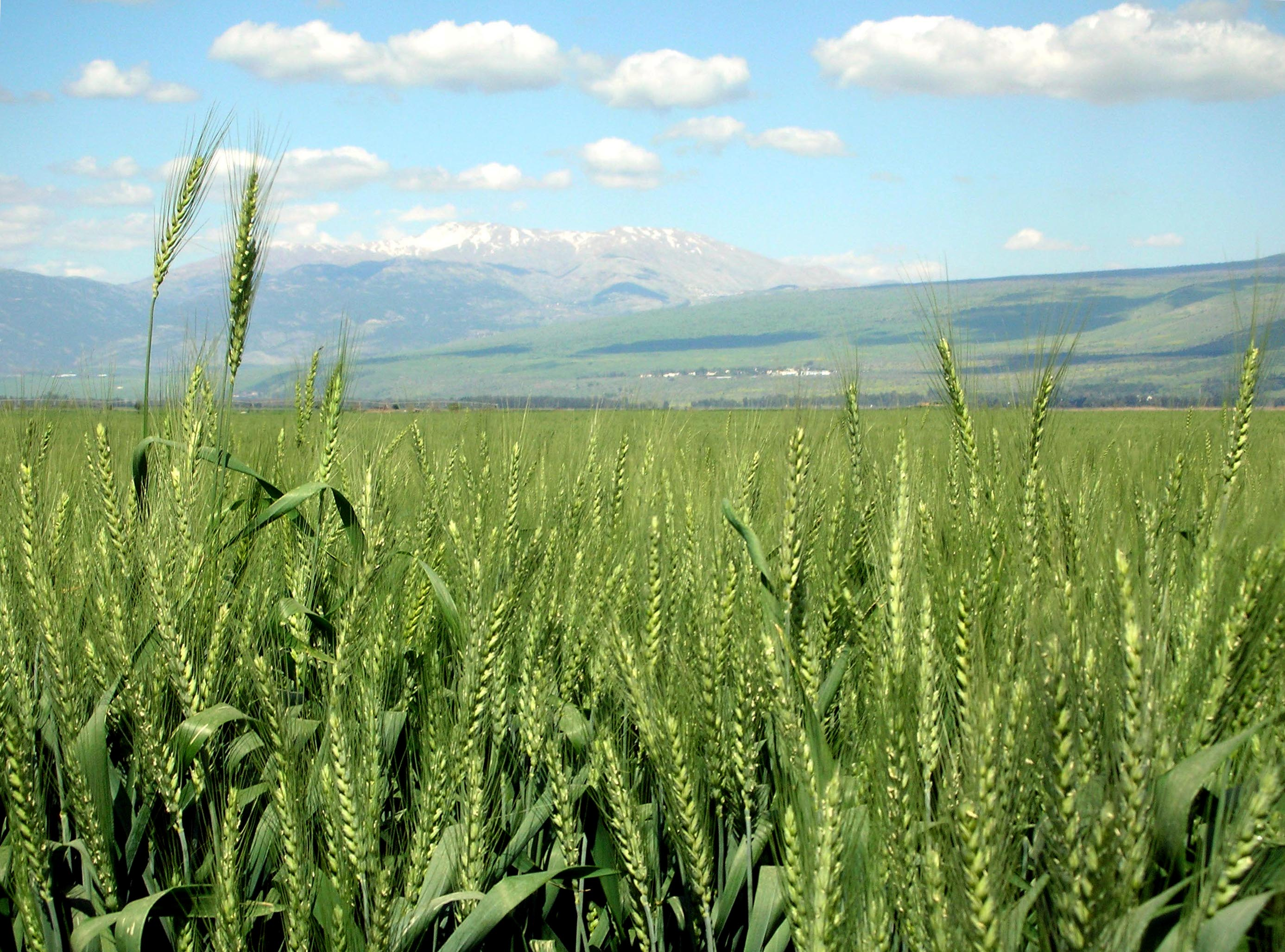
Wheat growing in the Hula Valley

=== Crops ===
Climate of Israel

Due to the diversity of the land and climate across the country, Israel can grow a wide range of crops. Field crops grown in the country include wheat, sorghum and corn. On 215,000 hectares of land, these sorts of crops are grown, 156,000 hectares of which are winter crops.

Fruit and vegetables grown include citrus, avocados, kiwifruit, guavas and mangos, grapes from orchards located on the Mediterranean coastal plain. Tomatoes, cucumbers, peppers and zucchini are grown commonly throughout the country; melons are grown during winter months in the valleys. Subtropical humid valleys in the country produce bananas and southern deserts grows dates, while in the northern hills apples, pears and cherries are grown. Furthermore, grape vineyards are found across the country, as the country's wine industry has developed to become a world-player.

In 1997, $107 million worth of cotton was grown in Israel with most of this sold in advance on the futures market. The crop is grown on 28,570 hectares of land, all of which is drip irrigated. 5.5 tons per hectare of raw cotton is averaged for the Acala crop; the Pima crop averages 5 tons per hectare, which are yields among the highest in the world.

=== Livestock ===
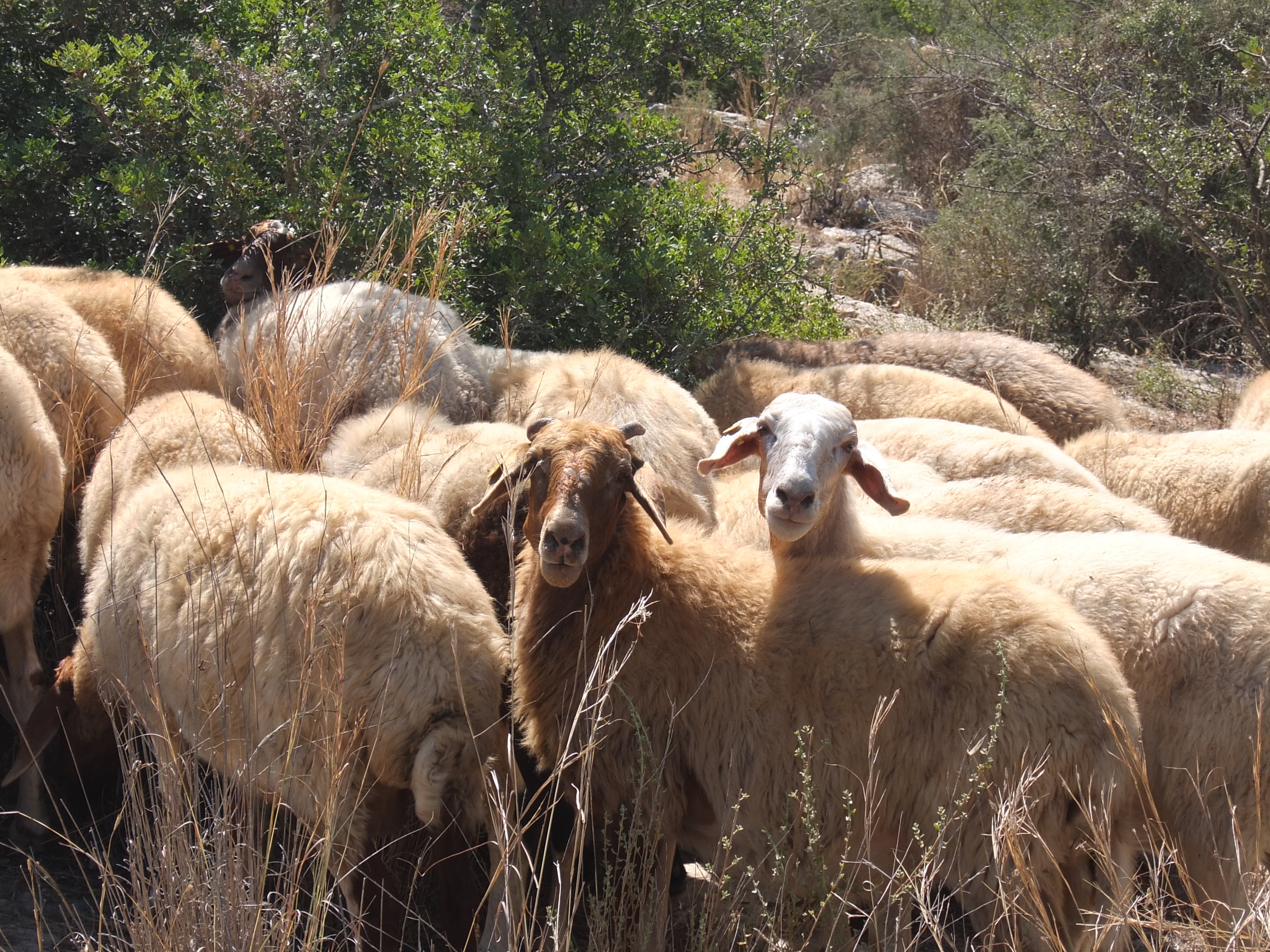
Flock of sheep near Aviezer, Israel

In 2010, cows in Israel were second only to Saudi Arabia in producing 10,035 kilograms (around 10,000 liters) per cow of milk in 2010, outperforming cows in the US (9,314 kg (20,534 lb) per cow), Japan (7,284), Korea (9,816), and Denmark (9,389). A total of 1.6 billion liters of milk was produced by Israeli cows in 2023.

All of Israel's milk consumption originates from dairy farms within the country with most herds consisting largely of Israel-Holsteins, a high-yielding, disease-resistant breed. Furthermore, sheep milk is exported. In terms of poultry, which makes up two-thirds of meat consumption, 85% originate from moshavim.

IAPV – Israeli acute paralysis virus – was first discovered here. After recent reports of severe mortality with symptoms similar to acute bee paralysis virus, Maori et al., 2007 isolated IAPV and published an RNA sequence and several other molecular components. IAPV continues to be significant in apiculture here and has since been identified in colonies around the world.

=== Fishing and aquaculture ===
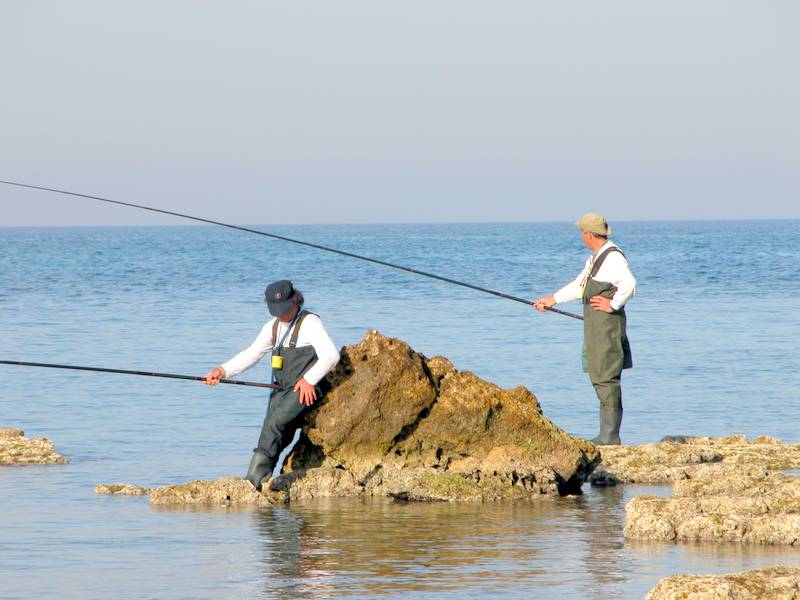
Fishing in Israel

The Mediterranean Sea is a source of salt-water fishing; freshwater fishing occurs on Lake Kinneret (the Sea of Galilee). Pioneering technology is being used to breed fish in artificial lakes in the Negev desert. Scientists of the Bengis Center for Desert Aquaculture at Ben-Gurion University of the Negev discovered that the brackish water under the desert can be used for agriculture, aquaculture and a combination of the two. This has led to the farming of fish, shrimp and crustaceans in the Negev.

Commercial fishing in the eastern Mediterranean has declined significantly due to depletion of fish reserves and the supply of fresh fish in Israel depends almost entirely on aquaculture. Fish from the Sea of Galilee include silver carp, grass carp, grey mullet, St. Peter's fish, rock bass, silver perch, and Asian seabass introduced from Australia. Fish grown in cages submerged in the sea include gilthead seabream (called denis in Israel), European sea bass and a South American variety of meager. Trout and salmon are raised in special canal-like ponds of running water of the Dan River, a tributary of the Jordan River.

=== Fruit and vegetables ===
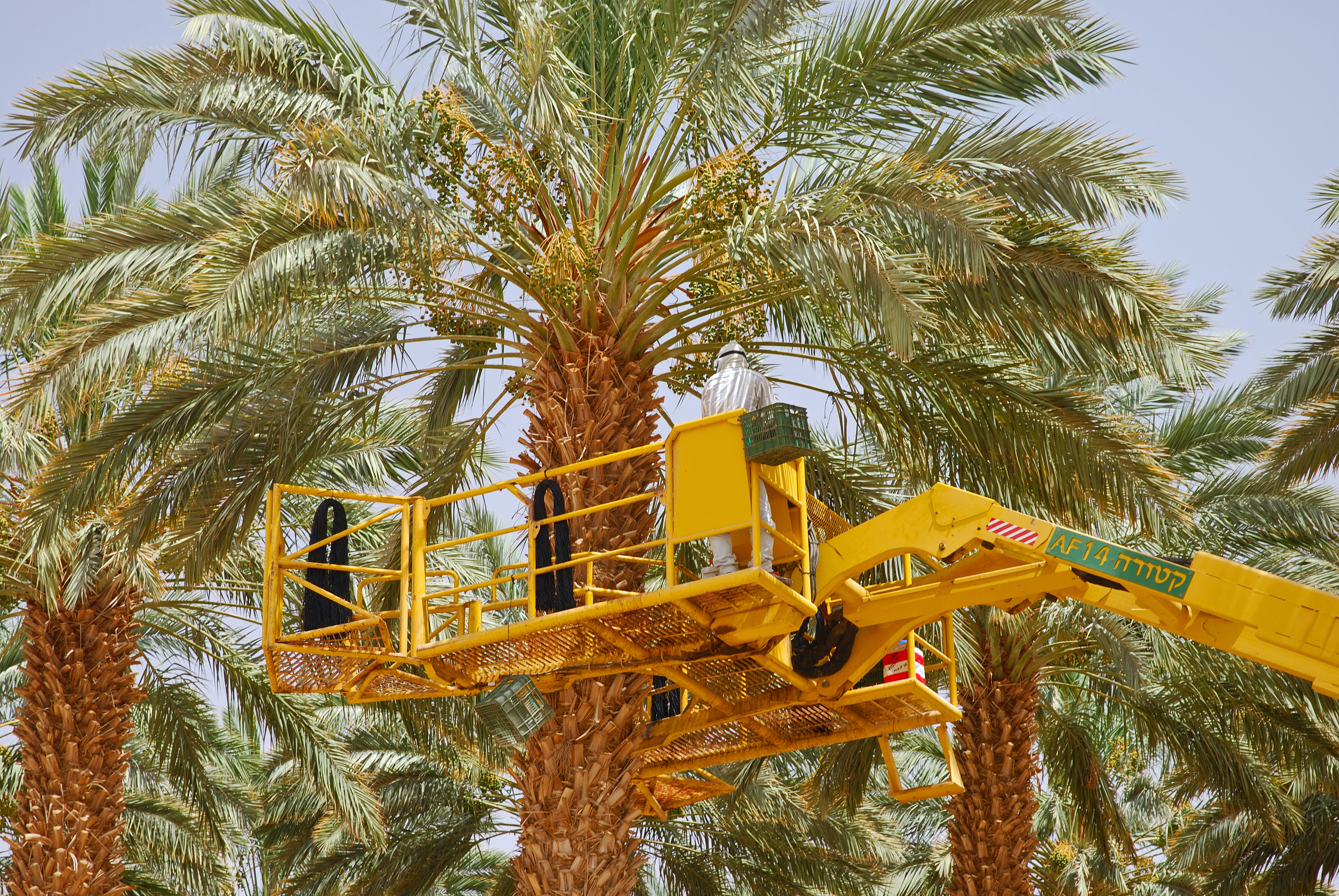
Date harvest in Israel

Israel is a producer and exporter of citrus, including oranges, grapefruit, tangerines and a hybrid of a grapefruit and a pomelo, developed in Israel.

More than forty types of fruit are grown in Israel. In addition to citrus, these include avocados, bananas, apples, olives, cherries, figs, plums, nectarines, grapes, dates, strawberries, prickly pear (tzabbar), persimmon, loquat and pomegranates. Israel is the second leading producer of loquat after Japan. Almond is also grown.

In 1973, two Israeli scientists, Haim Rabinowitch and Nachum Kedar, developed a variety of tomato with slower ripening than ordinary tomatoes in a hot climate. Their research led to the development of the world's first long shelf-life commercial tomato varieties. This discovery transformed agricultural economics in Israel, promoting the export of the vegetables seeds and the move to high-tech farming. It also had a global impact, enabling large-scale production through the prevention of spoilage. Previously, farmers were forced to discard 40 percent of their produce.

The Tomaccio tomato was developed by Hishtil Nurseries, which conducted a 12-year breeding program using wild Peruvian tomato species to create a sweet snack tomato.

Avocados are a major "money spinner" for Israeli agriculture, with almost half (45 per cent) being sold abroad.

=== Flowers ===
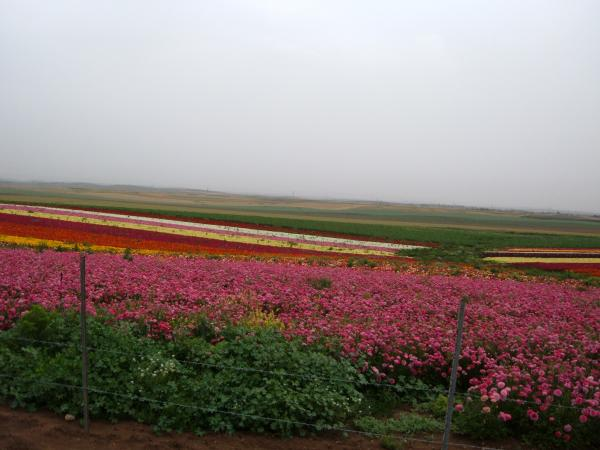
Flowers grown for export

In 2022, Israel ranked 9th among the countries in the world in the value of its flower exports which totaled almost $89 million. The flowers grown most commonly are Chamelaucium (waxflower), followed by roses, which are grown on 250 hectares (620 acres) of land. In addition to flowers favored in the West such as lilies, roses, and tulips, Israel exports desert varieties. It has become a major player in the global floral industry, especially as a supplier of traditional European flowers during the winter months. Similar to floriculture around the world, Israel's flower cultivation relies heavily on introduced species. Here these especially include Ornithogalum dubium, Leucojum aestivum and Paeonia.

== Research and technology ==
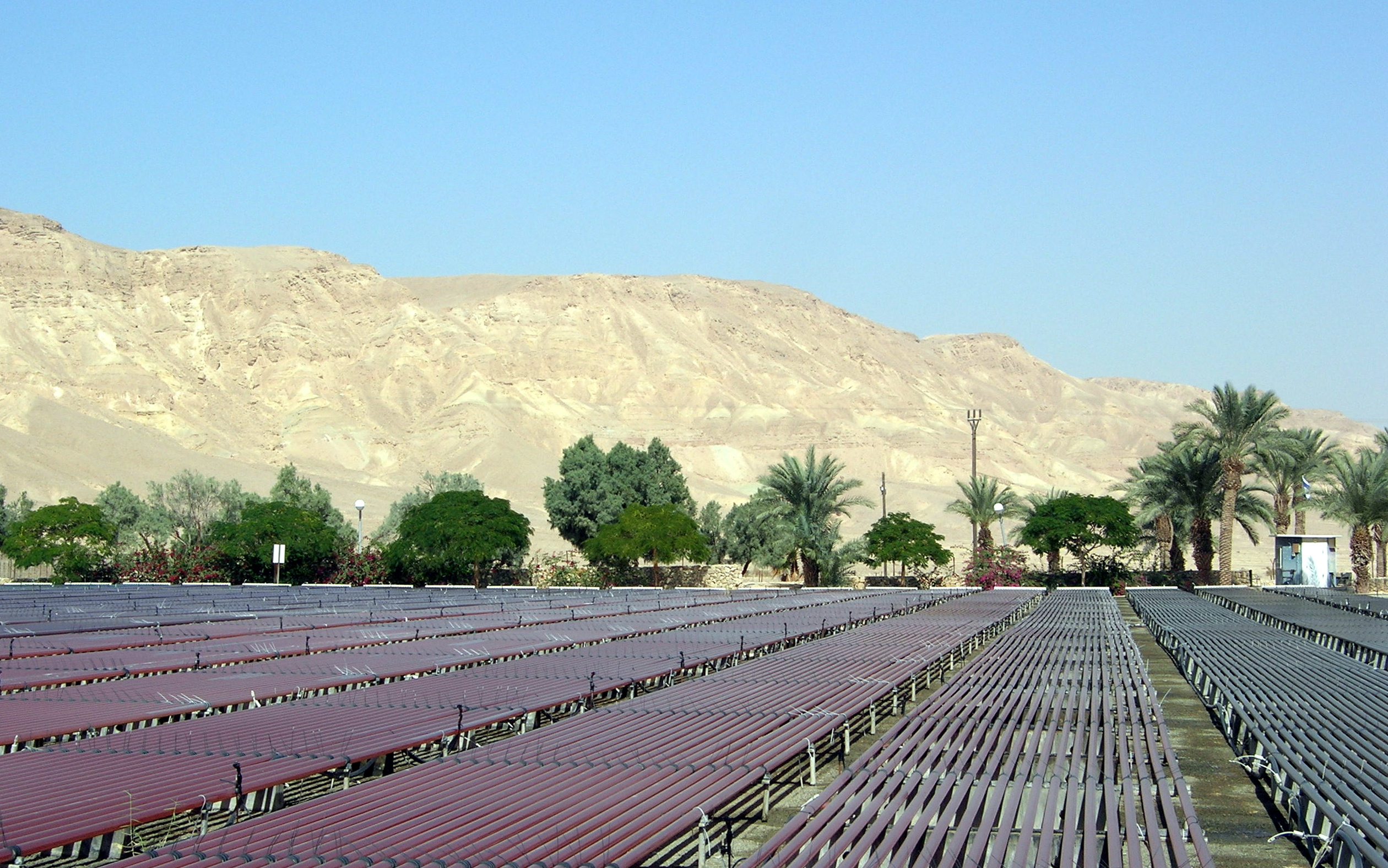
Algaculture in Kibbutz Ketura in the Negev Desert

Israel is a world leader in agricultural research and development, which has led to dramatic increases in the quantity and quality of the country's crops. The drive to increase yields and crop quality has led to the development of new seed and plant varieties, as well as to innovations such as a soil conditioner substance (vermiculite) which, when mixed with local soils, boosts crop yields, and drip irrigation.

== The Agritech exhibition ==
The Agritech Exhibition, held once every three years, is one of the leading international events of its kind to showcase Israel and international agriculture technologies. It traditionally attracts many Ministers of Agriculture, decision-makers, experts, practitioners and trainers in agriculture, and thousands of visitors. It provides an opportunity to see at one site the latest developments in agricultural sector and advanced agro-technologies, especially in the fields of irrigation, water management, arid zone agriculture, intensive greenhouse cultivation, development of new seed varieties, and organic and ecologically oriented agriculture.

At the Agritech Exhibition in 2012 there were more than 35,000 visitors, and more than 250 exhibitors.

== Organic farming ==
Organic produce makes up 1.5% of Israeli agricultural output, but it accounts for 13% of agricultural exports. Israel has 7,000 hectares (70,000 dunams) of organic fields: Vegetable crops grown in open fields account for 65% of the land use, fruit orchards – 25%, hothouse vegetables – 6% and herbs – 4%.

== Government regulation ==
Farm surpluses have been almost eradicated in the country, with farms having production and water quotas for each crop, which have stabilised prices. Production quotas apply to milk, eggs, poultry and potatoes. Israel's government also encourages a reduction in agricultural costs by trying to encourage specialised farming, and halting of production of crops for which no sufficiently profitable markets exist. The Ministry of Agriculture oversees the country's agricultural sector, including maintenance of standards of plant and animal health, agricultural planning, and research and marketing.

== Disease ==
A survey conducted across 2017–2018 made the first detection of Xylella fastidiosa in the country. This was found on almond in the Hula Valley, which is in the northeast. Polymerase chain reaction (PCR) identified it as the Xylella fastidiosa subsp. fastidiosa (Xff) subspecies.

== Agritourism ==
Agrotourism in Israel began gaining momentum towards the end of the 1980s as a response to declining agricultural incomes. Many farmers sought alternative sources of income, leading to the development of rural and agricultural tourism. The Israel Ministry of Tourism began providing support in 1993, and in collaboration with the Jewish Agency, runs "Tourism Incubators" in peripheral regions. These incubators offer business advisory services, professional skills training, and business accompaniment for rural tourism operators.

Historical agricultural practices attract visitors to agritourism sites in Israel such as Ein Yael, Neot Kedumim, and Kfar Kedem. These locations showcase traditional methods like terraced farming and ancient irrigation. Tourists can engage in activities such as grape stomping and olive pressing.

The Wine Route and Olive Route in the Mate Yehuda and Yoav regions allow visitors to explore small wineries and ancient and modern oil presses. The Dagon Museum in Haifa displays the history of grain cultivation from ancient times to the present. Binyamina, known for its citrus groves, and Kibbutz Ein Gedi near the Dead Sea, which demonstrates desert farming techniques, are also key agritourism sites.

For insights into the development of modern agriculture, tourists can also visit the Dubrovin Farm museum and the Museum of Pioneer Settlement at Kibbutz Yifat. These sites depict the establishment of Israel's agricultural infrastructure in the late 19th and early 20th centuries.

== Impact of the Gaza war on agriculture ==
As of October 7, Kibbutz Alumim, located less than 4 kilometers (2.5 miles) from the Gaza border, housed 41 foreign workers, comprising 24 from Thailand and 17 agricultural students from Nepal. However, the attacks in October resulted in the destruction of chicken coops, greenhouses, and some irrigation equipment along the Gaza border. The Alumim Agricultural Company was the sole segment of the business that remained unaffected by the conflict. The primary revenue for Alumim is derived from agriculture, horticulture, and livestock. When some workers returned, the Israeli army initially prohibited the company’s agricultural operations. Subsequently, limited access was granted. "Our wheat suffered significant damage. It was not planted in a timely manner and lacked the necessary care. Certain crops, including carrots, sweet potatoes, cabbages, and others, could not be harvested. We had extensive greenhouses for peppers, but everything was ruined. We used to be the largest supplier of small sweet peppers. Currently, we operate a very small farm," stated the CEO of the company.

== See also ==
- Agricultural Union
- Agrexco
- Agricultural Research Organization, Volcani Center
- Economy of Israel
- Granot Central Cooperative
- History of agriculture in Palestine
- List of forests in Israel
- Yatir Forest
