= Rodeph Shalom =

Rodeph (or Rodef) Shalom (Hebrew: רודף שלום "Pursuer of Peace"), may refer to:

== Canada ==
- Rodfei Sholem Anshei Kiev (Toronto), known as the Kiever Synagogue or Kiever Shul.

== United States ==
- Congregation Rodeph Sholom (Manhattan)
- Congregation Rodeph Shalom (Philadelphia), listed on the NRHP
- Rodef Shalom Congregation, Pittsburgh, Pennsylvania, also listed on the NRHP
  - Rodef Shalom Biblical Botanical Garden, on the grounds of Rodef Shalom in Pittsburgh
- Rodef Sholom (San Rafael, California)
- Temple Rodef Shalom (Falls Church, Virginia)
