= Noga Hareuveni =

Israeli botanist and Judaic Studies scholar

- נגה הראובני
- Noga Hareuveni
- Born: 1924
- Died: 2007 (aged 82–83)
- Education: Hebrew University of Jerusalem
- Known for: Founding Neot Kedumim
- Awards: Israel Prize (1994)
- Scientific career
- Fields: Botany, Judaic studies

Noga Hareuveni (Hebrew: נגה הראובני; 1924–2007) was an Israeli botanist and scholar of Judaic studies. In 1994 Noga Hareuveni was awarded the Israel Prize for his leading role in the creation of the Biblical garden and nature preserve named Neot Kedumim.

== Early life and education ==
Noga Hareuveni's parents, Ephraim and Hannah Hareuveni, were botanists who emigrated from Russia to Ottoman Palestine in 1912. They collected and classified plants that were mentioned in the Holy Scriptures of Judaism. On the Mount Scopus campus of Jerusalem's Hebrew University, they maintained the Museum of Biblical and Talmudic Botany, until it was destroyed in the 1948 war. After earning a master's degree in botany and Judaic studies, Noga Hareuveni developed a field survival course for training the Hagana and Palmach, Israel's pre-state military organizations. After 1948, he taught the same program to the Israel Defense Forces.

== Career ==
In the 1960s Hareuveni realized his parents' dream of establishing a botanical reserve of biblical plants, which is today called Neot Kedumim. On 253 hectares, the staff of the botanical reserve now cultivates tens of thousands of trees and other plants. Great Lebanon cedars are the most impressive of the trees.

"These great trees of course are not native to Israel," Dr. Hareuveni says, "but they're referred to many times in the Bible, usually as a symbol of haughtiness, or again when Solomon had cedar timbers shipped from Lebanon for the construction of the Temple. In 1936 I accompanied my parents to Beirut, where they received permission from the Lebanese Ministry of Agriculture to purchase some seeds. I was the one who shinnied up a cedar and collected the cones. These my parents took back to Jerusalem and planted on Mount Scopus. Jerusalem is less than 3,000 feet above sea level, and most experts said that was too low for cedars to grow. ... But not only did the cedars grow," Nogah Hareuveni continues, "they somehow even survived the neglect of 19 years while Mount Scopus was a no man's land in divided Jerusalem. ..."

== Selected publications ==
- Ecology in the Bible by Nogah Hareuveni in association with Helen Frenkley; photos. by Nogah Hareuveni, Yaakov Reshef, Ran Caspi. 1974.
- Nature in our biblical heritage by Nogah Hareuveni; translated from Hebrew and adapted by Helen Frenkley. 1980.
- Tree and shrub in our Biblical heritage by Nogah Hareuveni; translated from Hebrew and adapted by Helen Frenkley. 1984.
- Emblem of the State of Israel : its roots in the nature and heritage of Israel by Nogah Hareuveni; translated by Helen Frenkley. 1988.
- Desert and shepherd in our Biblical heritage by Nogah Hareuveni; translated from Hebrew and adapted by Helen Frenkley. 1991.
