= Seinan Gakuin University Biblical Botanical Garden =

Botanical garden in Fukuoka, Japan

Coordinates: 33°35′N 130°24′E

- Interactive map of Seinan Gakuin University Biblical Botanical Garden
- Type: Biblical garden

The Seinan Gakuin University Biblical Botanical Garden (西南学院大学聖書植物園, Seinan Gakuin Daigaku Seisho Shokubutsuen) is a Biblical garden, one of a number botanical gardens located across the campus of Seinan Gakuin University, Nishijin 6-2-92, Sawara-ku, Fukuoka, Fukuoka, Japan. It is open daily.

The garden contains about 80 plants mentioned in the Bible, with labels in Hebrew, Greek, Latin, English, and Japanese, as well as a reference to the Biblical passage in which the plant is mentioned.

== Exhibits ==
The collection includes:

- Abies firma
- Aloe arborescens var. natalensis
- Aloe vera
- Anemone coronaria
- Anethum graveolens
- Brassica nigra
- Cinnamomum verum
- Cistus creticus
- Coriandrum sativum
- Crocus sativus
- Cuminum cyminum
- Cupressus sempervirens
- Cyperus papyrus
- Echinops ritro
- Ficus carica
- Foeniculum vulgare
- Gossypium herbaceum
- Hedera helix
- Hordeum vulgare
- Hyoscyamus spp.
- Hyoscyamus aureus
- Hyssopus officinalis
- Laurus nobilis
- Lavandula stoechas
- Lawsonia inermis
- Lens culinaris
- Lilium candidum
- Linum usitatissimum
- Lolium temulentum
- Lycium chinense
- Majorana syriaca
- Mentha longifolia
- Micromeria fruticosa
- Morus nigra
- Myrtus communis
- Nerium oleander
- Nicotiana glauca
- Nigella sativa
- Olea europaea
- Ornithogalum spp.
- Phoenix dactylifera
- Phragmites australis
- Pinus densiflora
- Populus nigra 'Italica'
- Prunus dulcis
- Punica granatum
- Quercus calliprinos
- Quercus glauca
- Ricinus communis
- Rosa canina
- Rosa hybrida
- Rosa phoenicia
- Rubia tinctorum
- Ruta chalepensis
- Salvia fruticosa
- Salvia hierosolymitana
- Silybum marianum
- Sternbergia clusiana
- Trachycarpus fortunei
- Triticum aestivum
- Urtica urens
- Vitis vinifera
- Zelkova serrata
- Ziziphus spina-christi

== See also ==
- List of botanical gardens in Japan
