= Citronellyl acetate =

Names
- IUPAC name 3,7-dimethyloct-6-enyl acetate

Identifiers
CAS Number	150-84-5
3D model (JSmol)	Interactive image
ChEBI	CHEBI:70478
ChEMBL	ChEMBL1453648
ChemSpider	8667
ECHA InfoCard	100.005.251
EC Number	205-775-0
KEGG	C12298
PubChem CID	9017
UNII	IZ420RT3OY
CompTox Dashboard (EPA)	DTXSID5051739
- InChI: InChI=1S/C12H22O2/c1-10(2)6-5-7-11(3)8-9-14-12(4)13/h6,11H,5,7-9H2,1-4H3 Key: JOZKFWLRHCDGJA-UHFFFAOYSA-N
- SMILES: CC(CCC=C(C)C)CCOC(=O)C

Properties
Chemical formula	C_{12}H_{22}O_{2}
Molar mass	198.306 g·mol^{−1}
Appearance	colourless
Odor	fruity
Density	0.888 g/cm^{3}
Boiling point	229 °C (444 °F; 502 K)
Solubility in water	insoluble
Solubility	soluble in alcohol, most fixed oils insoluble in glycerol, propylene glycol
log P	4.220
Refractive index (n_{D})	1.440-1.450

Hazards
- GHS labelling
Pictograms	(GHS07: Exclamation mark) (GHS09: Environmental hazard)
Signal word	Warning
Hazard statements	H315, H319, H411
Precautionary statements	P264, P264+P265, P273, P280, P302+P352, P305+P351+P338, P321, P332+P317, P337+P317, P362+P364, P391, P501
- Except where otherwise noted, data are given for materials in their standard state (at 25 °C [77 °F], 100 kPa). Infobox references

Citronellyl acetate is a synthetically made and naturally occurring organic compound from the group of carboxylic acid esters. It occurs naturally in citrus fruits, but is also used industrially as a flavoring agent.

== Occurrence ==
Citronellyl acetate is found in the peel oils of various citrus fruits, such as oranges, bitter oranges, lemons, and grapefruits. It is also an important aroma component in kumquat oil and in roses (Rosa hybrida). It is also found in Douglas fir, in Vitex agnus-castus , in Corymbia citriodora, in certain subspecies of common juniper, in catnip and in Sichuan pepper.

== Synthesis ==
Citronellyl acetate can be produced enzymatically, i.e., catalyzed by a lipase, via various routes, for example by direct esterification of acetic acid with citronellol, by transesterification of butyl acetate with citronellol, or by transesterification of citronellyl butyrate with butyl acetate.

== Usage ==
Citronellyl acetate is used as a flavoring agent and is generally approved for use in food in the EU under FL number 09.012.

== Safety ==
Citronellyl acetate is neither cytotoxic nor genotoxic, but it can cause sensitization. In animal studies with rats and mice, adverse health effects were only observed at higher doses.
