= Neot Kedumim =

Biblical garden and nature preserve in Israel

- Biblical Landscape Reserve in Israel
- נאות קדומים
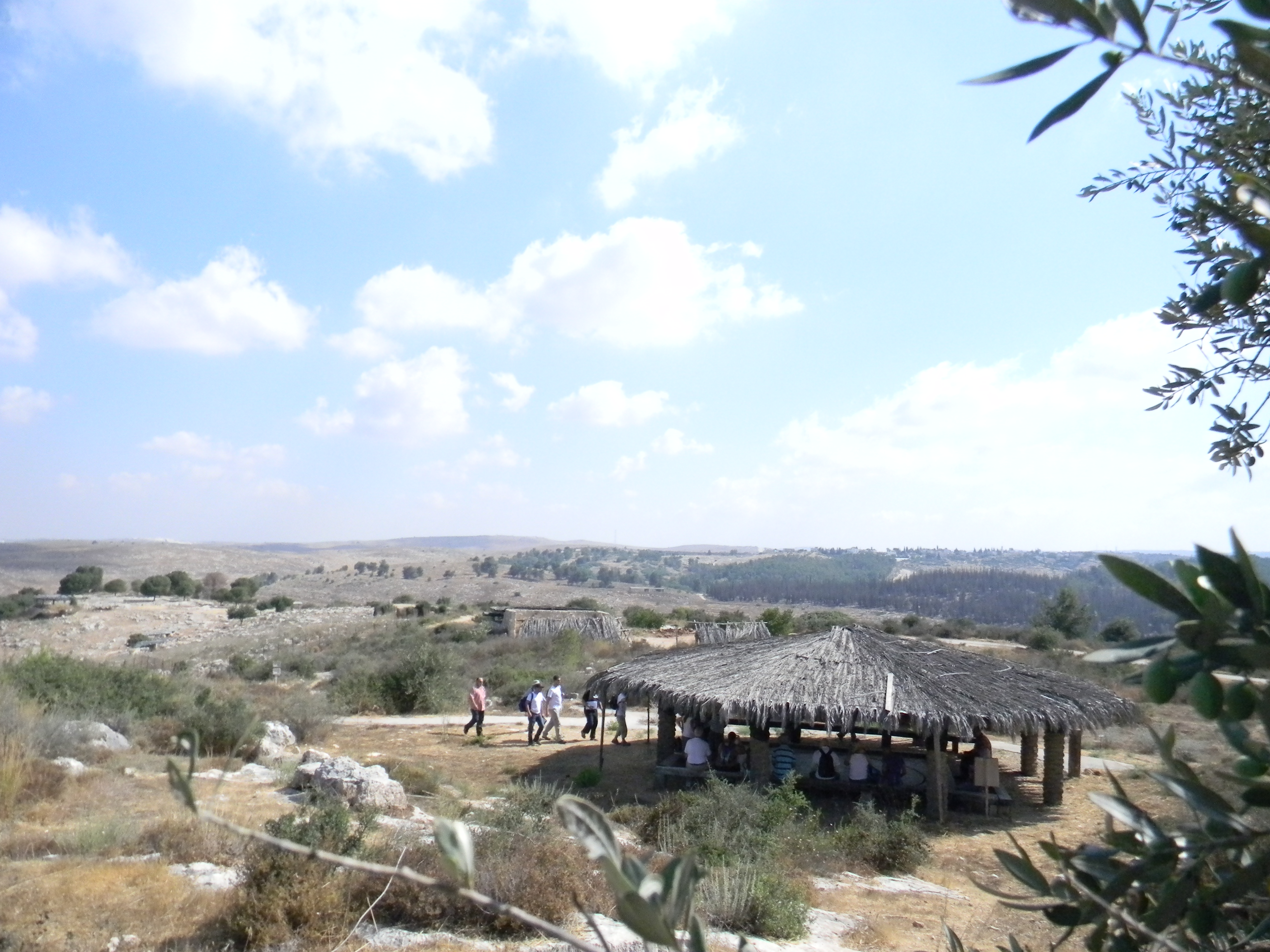
- Neot Kedumim landscape
- Interactive map of Neot Kedumim
- Type: Biblical garden and nature preserve
- Nearest city: Modi'in, Israel
- Coordinates: 31°55′44″N 35°1′28″E
- Area: 2500 dunam
- Established: 1964
- Founder: Noga Hareuveni
- Etymology: Pleasant pastures (or habitations) of old
- Awards: Israel Prize (1994)
- Website: www.neot-kedumim.org.il

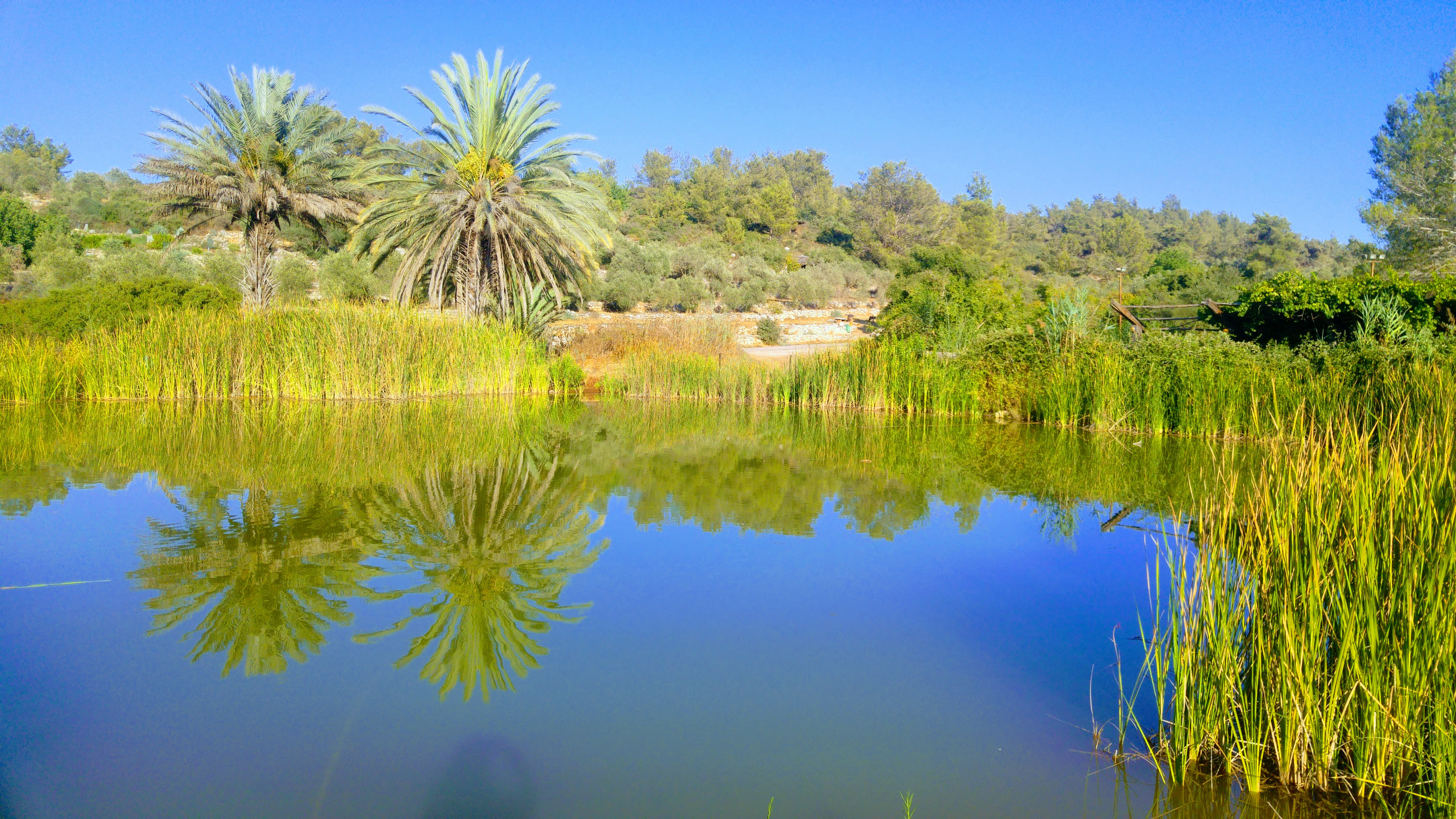
Neot Kedumim lake view

Neot Kedumim, the Biblical Landscape Reserve in Israel (Hebrew: נאות קדומים) is a Biblical garden and nature preserve located near Modi'in, midway between Jerusalem and Tel Aviv, Israel.

== Etymology ==
Neot Kedumim means "pleasant pastures (or habitations) of old."

== Overview ==
Neot Kedumim is an attempt to re-create the physical setting of the Hebrew Bible. The park covers an area of about 2,500 dunams (2.5 km^{2}; 0.97 sq mi). The idea of planting such a garden dates back to 1925. In 1964, land was allocated for the project with the help of Prime Minister David Ben-Gurion.

Neot Kedumim comprises a series of natural and agricultural landscapes, among them the Forest of Milk and Honey, the Dale of the Song of Songs, Isaiah's Vineyard and the Fields of the Seven Species. Signs are posted throughout the garden quoting relevant Jewish texts in Hebrew and English.

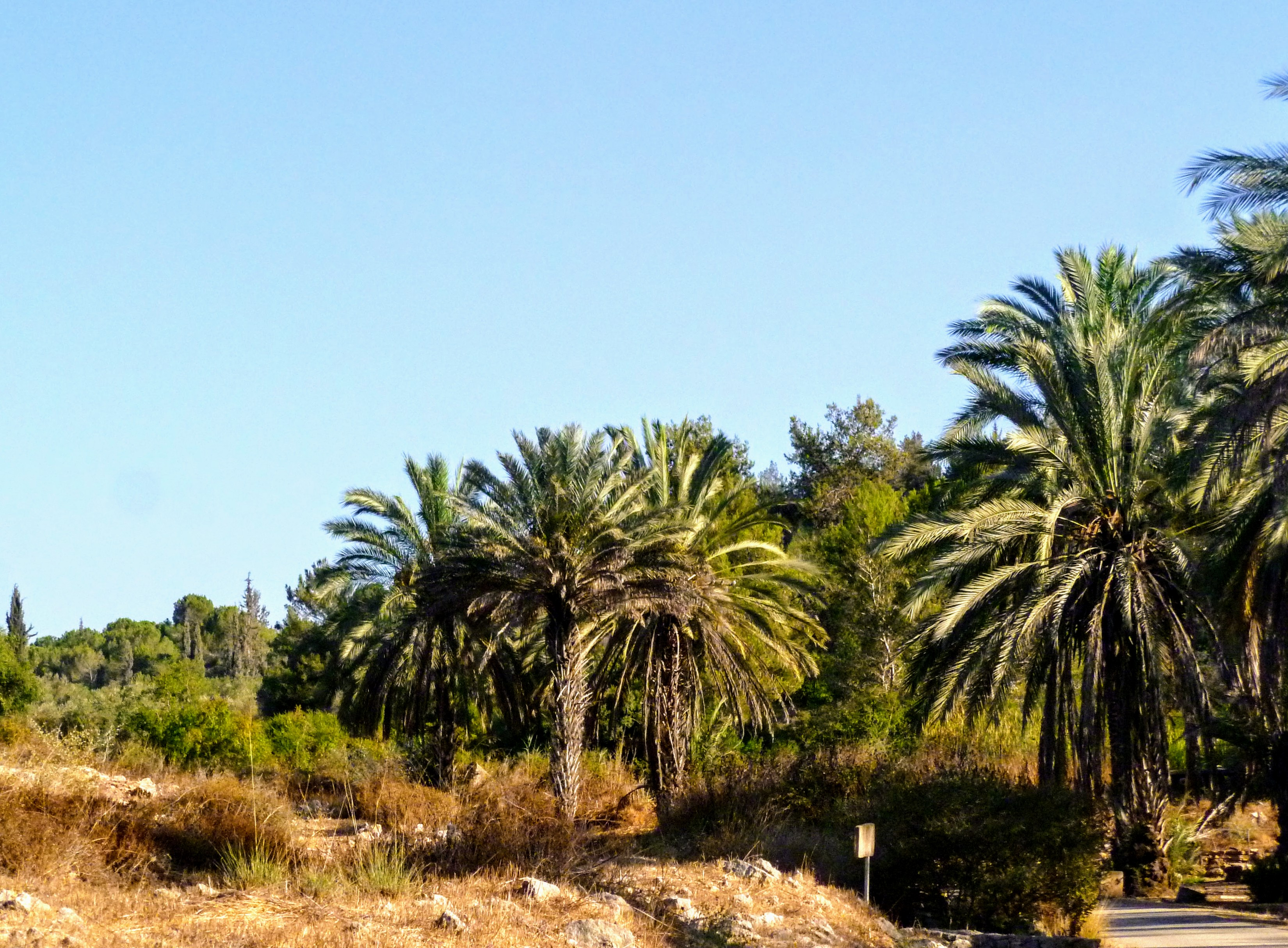
palm trees

Neot Kedumim offers pre-booked organized tours but is also accessible to individuals who can roam the site on their own with maps provided by the park.

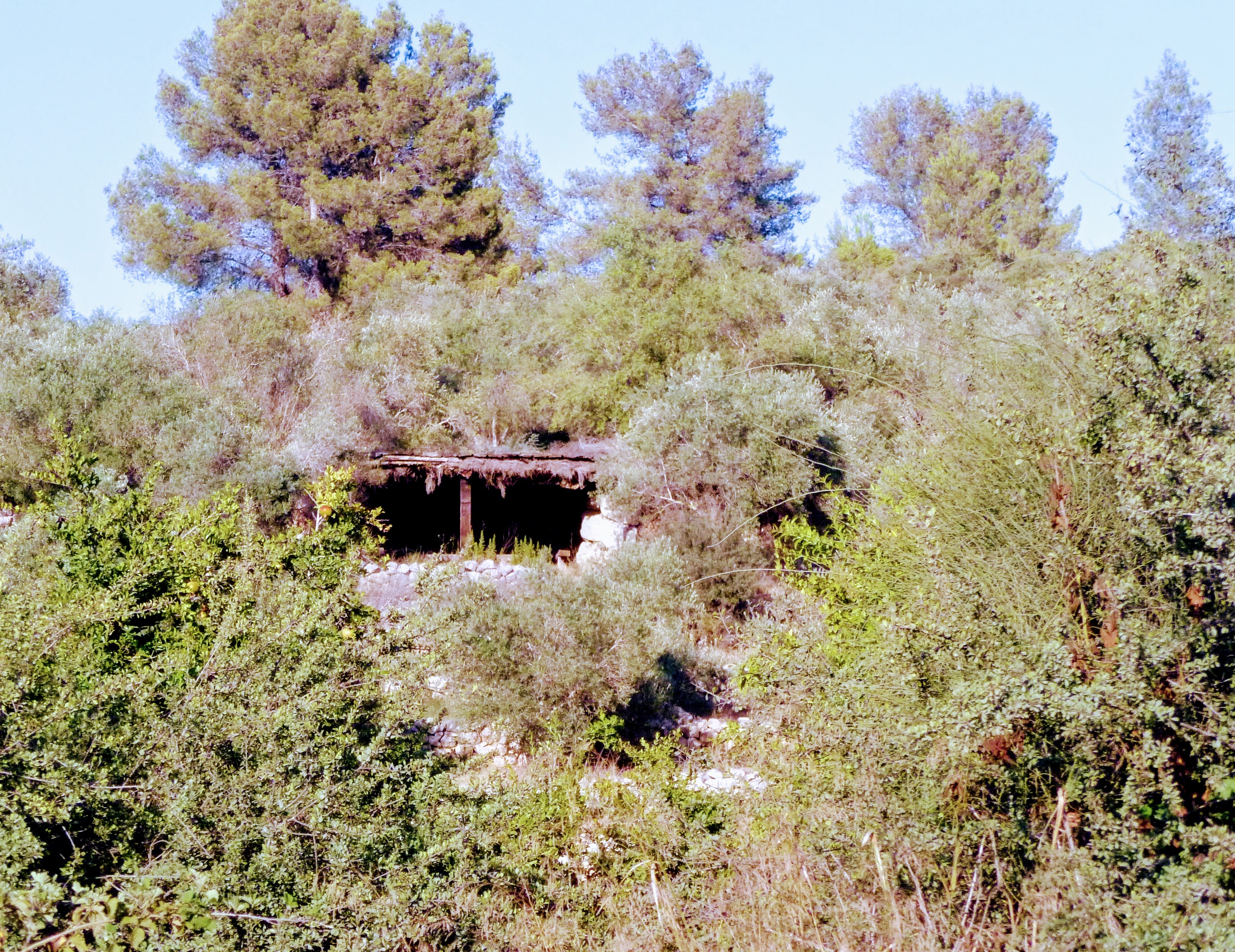
Neot Kedumim view

== History ==
When Ephraim and Hannah Hareuveni immigrated from Russia to Ottoman Palestine in 1912, they dreamed of developing a biblical landscape reserve that "embodied the panorama and power of the landscapes that both shaped the values of the Bible and provided a rich vocabulary for expressing them". Their son, Noga Hareuveni, a physicist, dedicated his life to implementing his parents' dream. To build the park, thousands of tons of soil were trucked in, reservoirs were built to catch runoff rain water, ancient terraces, wine presses and ritual baths were restored, and hundreds of varieties of plants were cultivated.

In 1994 Neot Kedumim and Noga Hareuveni, were awarded the Israel Prize for their special contribution to society and the State of Israel.

== Salvia and menorah ==
Plants in several species of the genus Salvia resemble the menorah.

A shrub called the moriah, which bears a striking resemblance to the menorah, particularly inspires Miss Frenkley. "In Exodus, Chapters 25 and 37," she says, "we get a very exact description of how the artisan Bezalel fashioned the first menorah, or seven-branched candelabram, for the Tabernacle in Sinai. We're told it was patterned with three knobbed branches on each side of the main stem, and with so many almond-shaped calyxes and flowers on each branch. Dr. Hareuveni's parents searched for the botanical prototype and identified it as this moriah, or Salvia palaestina. It's a member of the sage family, and its very fragrant oil was likely used in the Temple. In the Bible we're told that the burning of sweet incense always accompanied the lighting of the menorah."

== See also ==
- List of Israel Prize recipients
- Tourism in Israel
- Wildlife in Israel
