= Olives in Judaism =

The olive is listed in the Hebrew Bible as one of the "Seven Species" of the Land of Israel. It was not only a staple in the Israelite diet, but held great cultural and religious significance—olive oil was prized as the only pure substance for holy anointing rituals and for the Temple menorah in Jerusalem, thus giving rise to a legacy that has persisted throughout Jewish history. Olives are frequently mentioned in Jewish religious texts and are generally regarded as a symbol of peace or victory and wisdom.

== History ==
=== Background ===
The olive tree is native to the Mediterranean basin. Olives have been cultivated since at least the 5th millennium BCE, evidenced through archaeological finds from Teleilat el-Ghassul in present-day Jordan, and were "economically the most important classical fruit of the Mediterranean basin". The discovery of olive stones beyond their natural environment indicates cultivation in the Jordan Valley, likely relying on irrigation. The production of olive oil can be evidenced through large amounts of crushed olive stones left over from pressing, and the remains of olive presses. In the Middle and Late Bronze Age olive cultivation spread to much of the Mediterranean. An increasing amount of olive pollen in archaeological soils indicates the plant became more common around the Sea of Galilee. After a decrease in tree pollen (including from olives) in the period of about 1500 BCE to 1100 BCE, from 1100 BCE it became more common indicating a change from a dry climate to one more suited to agriculture.

=== Iron Age ===
Emil G. Hirsch and Immanuel Benzinger stated that the Israelites learned to cultivate olives from the Canaanites. Olives and olive by-products were used as a source of food, light (fuel), and hygiene. Olive oil was also used in rituals and cosmetics. In the 9th and 8th centuries BCE, industrial villages dedicated to olive oil production, likely under royal patronage, were established. These villages housed dozens of presses, exemplified by discoveries at sites like Khirbat Khudash. In the 8th century BCE, the olive oil industry experienced a boom in mass production across both Israelite kingdoms. Following the Assyrian conquest of Israel, the production of olive oil continued in Judah, from where it was shipped to the other vassal states of the Neo-Assyrian Empire.

Later Jewish populations mostly planted olive trees in Galilee, Judea, and Samaria. The olive industry persisted as a key part of the Jewish economy even as the land changed hands under various powers.

=== Modern Jewish period ===
Following the First Aliyah, Jewish olim began planting a number of plants, including olive trees. Olive oil was sold in markets and exported. Olive oil was the most common oil used by the Jewish community. With the foundation of a modern industrial oil factory that produced distilled oils from various grains, such as soy, sunflower, and corn, olive oil experienced a decline.

Over the 20th century, the Jewish population established numerous olive plantations. The Kibbutz movements played a significant role in fostering the cultivation of olives.

At the turn of the 3rd millennium, Israel saw an increase in olive oil consumption. Israel's Ministry of Agriculture promotes and supports the production of olives for olive oil pressing and local usage.

Since 2021, the olive tree has been the national tree of the State of Israel. Its branches are depicted on the Emblem of Israel and the insignia of the Israel Defence Forces (incl. The Military Rabbinate).

In Israel, olives are an economically important fruit. Within Israel's olive plantations, some olive trees have stood for centuries. The trees can be found in various regions, from the elevated mountain areas to the coastal plains. The landscape contains ~340,000 dunams (84,000 acres) of olive plantations. These expansive groves are home to a variety of olive types. Among them are the: Zuri, Barnea, Manzanillo, Picual, Muhasan, Nabali, Souri, Kalamata, Picholine, Maalot and Coratina.

== Cultural significance ==
=== In Hebrew scripture ===
The first mention of olives appears in the narrative of Noah's flood, where the dove returns to the ark with an olive leaf in her mouth, signifying the receding of the waters (Genesis 8:11). During the sabbatical year, the land is to rest, allowing the poor and beasts to eat from vineyards and oliveyards (Exodus 23:11). Pure beaten olive oil is commanded for the continual lighting of the lamp in the tabernacle (Exodus 27:20). The holy anointing oil is compounded with spices and a hin of olive oil for consecrating the tabernacle and priests (Exodus 30:24). In Leviticus, clear beaten olive oil is again specified for the sanctuary lamps to burn continually (Leviticus 24:2). Houses full of goods, cisterns, vineyards, and olive trees are among the inheritances in the Promised Land sworn to the patriarchs (Deuteronomy 6:11). The Land of Israel is praised as one of wheat, barley, vines, figs, pomegranates, olive oil, and honey (Deuteronomy 8:8). When beating the olive tree for harvest, branches are not to be gone over again, leaving remnants for the stranger, fatherless, and widow (Deuteronomy 24:20). As a curse for disobedience, olive trees throughout the coasts will cast their fruit, preventing anointing with oil (Deuteronomy 28:40). The Israelites receive a land with cities, vineyards, and oliveyards they did not plant or build (Joshua 24:13). In Jotham's parable, trees seek a king, first asking the olive tree to reign over them (Judges 9:8). The olive tree refuses, unwilling to leave its fatness honoring God and men to wave over other trees (Judges 9:9). Samson sets fire to Philistine standing corn, shocks, vineyards, and olives using foxes with torches (Judges 15:5). A king will take the best fields, vineyards, and oliveyards to give to his servants (1 Samuel 8:14). Elisha questions if it is time to receive money, garments, oliveyards, vineyards, sheep, oxen, and servants (2 Kings 5:26) An Assyrian tempts surrender with a land of corn, wine, bread, vineyards, olive trees, and honey (2 Kings 18:32). Within the Holy of Holies, two cherubims were made of olive tree, each ten cubits high (1 Kings 6:23). Doors for the holy of holies are made of olive tree, with carvings of cherubims, palms, and flowers overlaid with gold (1 Kings 6:31). For the temple door, posts are made of olive tree (1 Kings 6:33). Baalhanan the Gederite oversees the olive trees and sycamores in the low plains (1 Chronicles 27:28). The nobles' usury leads to restoring fields, vineyards, oliveyards, and houses to the people (Nehemiah 5:11). Proclamation is made to fetch olive branches, pine, myrtle, palm, and thick tree branches for booths (Nehemiah 8:15). Fortified cities, fat land, houses, cisterns, vineyards, oliveyards, and fruit trees are captured and enjoyed (Nehemiah 9:25). The wicked shake off unripe grapes and cast off flowers as the olive (Job 15:33).

=== In Israelite and Jewish culture ===
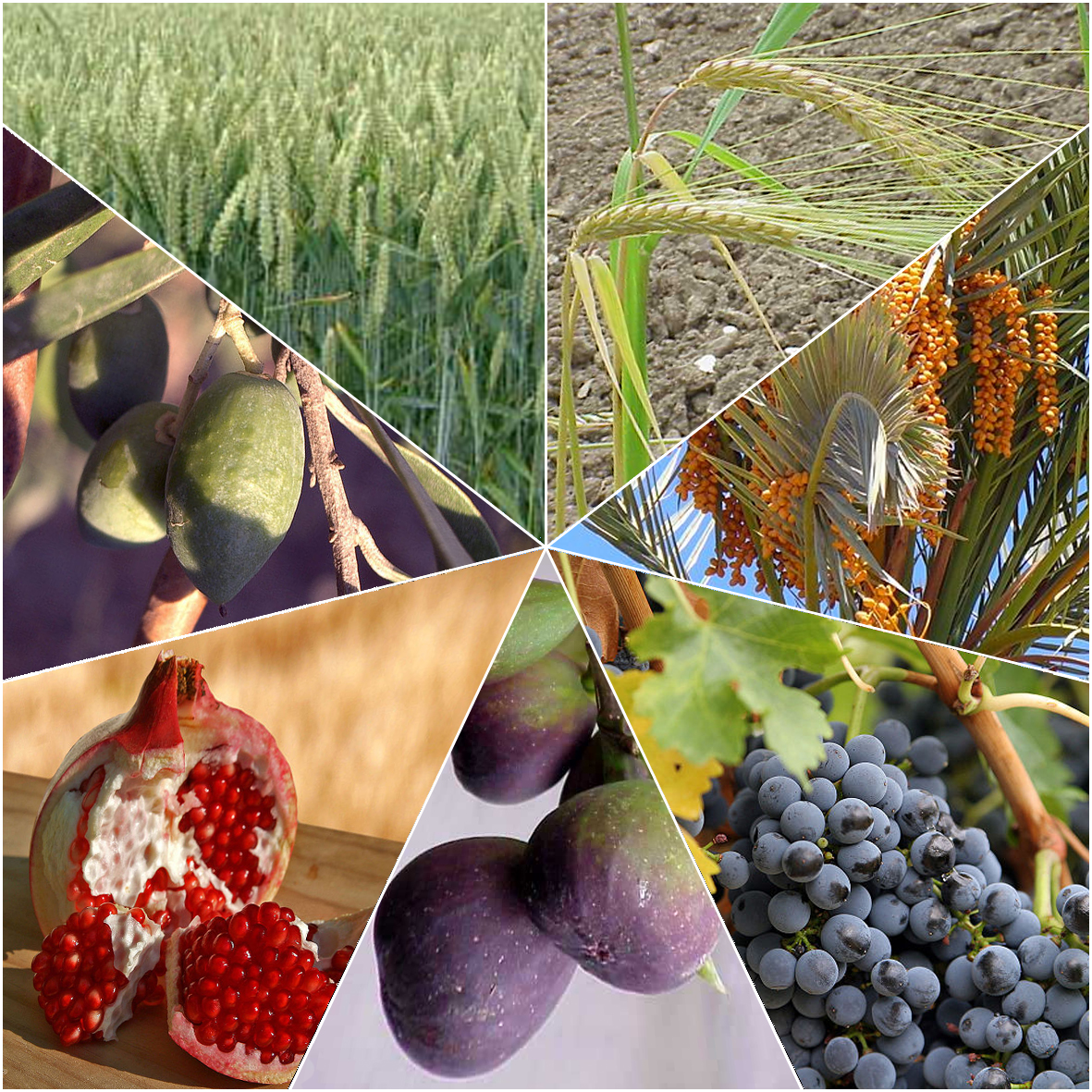
The olive (left) is one the Seven Species listed in Deuteronomy 8:8.

Olives are generally regarded as a symbol of peace or victory and wisdom. The olive tree is one of the most important trees in Judaism and Jewish culture. They symbolize Jewish connection to their historic homeland. Olives are a part of the Seven Species. They were part of the diet of the Ancient Israelites, and are still used in modern Israeli and Jewish cuisines.

- In the times of the Holy Jewish Temple, olive trees, olive oil, and olives played significant roles in various aspects of religious rituals and practices. Olive oil was crucial for lighting the Menorah inside the Temple. The Menorah was a central fixture in the Temple's sanctuary. Pure olive oil was used to keep the Menorah burning continuously.
- On Tu BiShvat, the Jewish holiday known as the New Year for Trees, olive trees hold a special significance along with other fruit-bearing trees. Olive trees are among the seven species (shiv'at haminim) that are traditionally associated with the Land of Israel's fertility and abundance.
- Hanukkah commemorates the rededication of the Second Temple in Jerusalem after its desecration by the Seleucid Empire. According to Jewish tradition, during the Maccabean Revolt, only a small amount of pure olive oil sufficient for one day's lighting of the Menorah miraculously lasted for eight days until new oil could be prepared. This miracle is celebrated as a symbol of divine intervention and perseverance.
- Following the Great Flood, Noah sent out birds from the ark to check if the waters had receded. First, he sent a raven, but it found no place to rest and returned. Then, he sent a dove, but it also came back. On the 301st day of the flood, Noah sent the dove again. This time, the dove stayed away all day and returned in the evening with an olive leaf in its mouth. Noah then knew that the waters had abated from the earth.
- Anointing Oil: Olive oil was used to anoint kings, priests, and prophets in ancient Israel. The anointing oil, known as "shemen hamishchah," symbolized sanctity and was a critical element in various rituals.

== See also ==
- Mount of Olives Jewish Cemetery
- Olive cultivation in Palestine
