= Seinan Gakuin University =

Baptist Christian university in Fukuoka, Japan

Coordinates: 33.5847°N 130.354949°E

- Motto: "Seinan, Be true to Christ"
- Type: Private
- Established: Gakuin founded 1916; University chartered 1949
- Founders: C. K. Dozier
- President: Naoki Imai
- Academic staff: 191
- Undergraduates: 8,107
- Postgraduates: 145
- Location: Nishijin, Fukuoka, Fukuoka, Japan
- Campus: Urban
- Mascot: None
- Website: Official site

Seinan Gakuin University (西南学院大学, Seinan Gakuin Daigaku) is a Baptist Christian university in Fukuoka, Japan. It is one of the leading privately-funded universities in Western Japan, known for its strong focus on humanities and international exchange.

== History ==
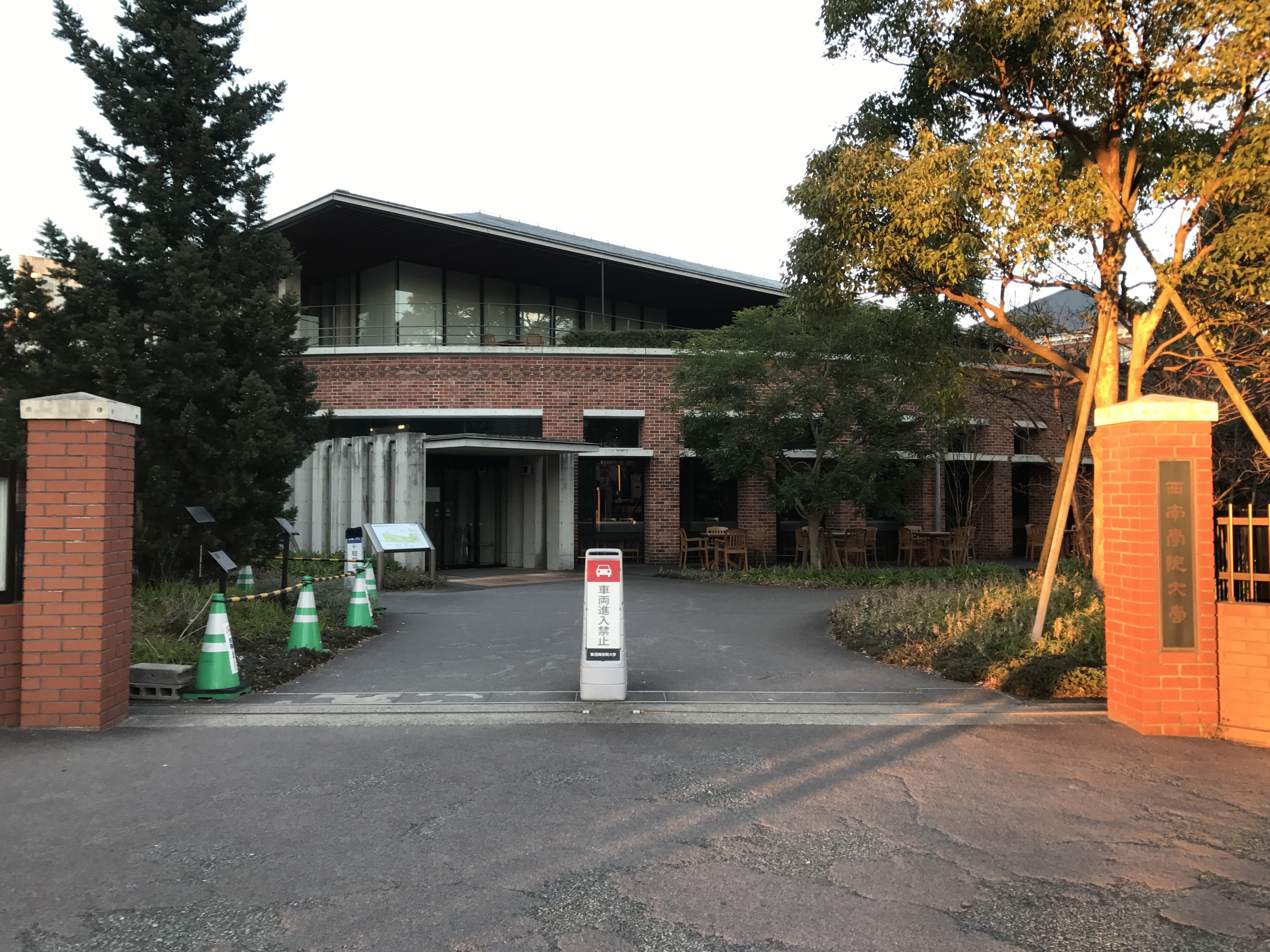
Southwest Cross Plaza

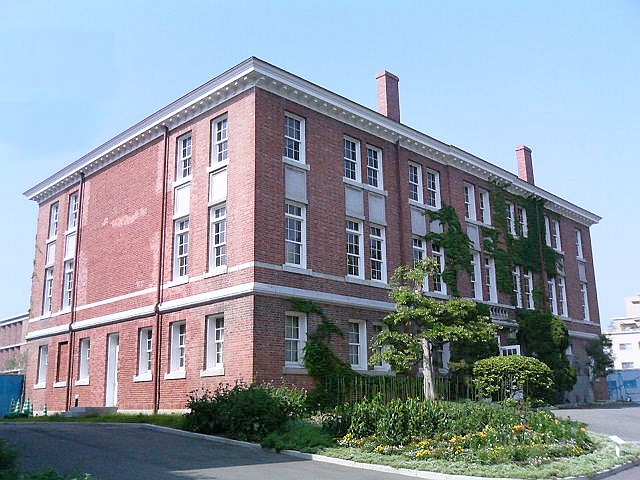
Museum

It was founded in 1916 as an academy for boys by Rev. C. K. Dozier, a Baptist missionary from the United States. In 1949, it was officially chartered as a university under the post-war Japanese education system.

The university has a long history of international exchange and cooperation. It was the first school in Japan to incorporate English-language education into its curriculum and to establish a foreign exchange program with universities overseas.

The chancellor of Seinan Gakuin is Yoshiki Terazono, and Gary W. Barkley, a former Baptist missionary, has served as the university president since December 2006.

== Campus ==
Seinan Gakuin University is located in Sawara Ward of Fukuoka and is between the Nishijin and Fujisaki subway stations. The campus is situated adjacent to Fukuoka City's key waterfront area, Seaside Momochi, amid several other academic and cultural facilities, educational and research centers.

== Academic programs ==
The university offers undergraduate and graduate programs across several faculties:

- Faculty of Theology
- Faculty of Foreign Language Studies
- Faculty of Literature
- Faculty of Commerce
- Faculty of Economics
- Faculty of Law
- Faculty of Human Sciences
- Faculty of Intercultural Studies

=== Educational philosophy ===
Seinan Gakuin University emphasizes providing a well-rounded education based on Christian principles. The curriculum included special courses on the study of Christianity and chapel services.

== Points of interest ==
- Seinan Gakuin University Biblical Botanical Garden
