= Seven Species =

Agricultural products listed as special to Israel in the Bible

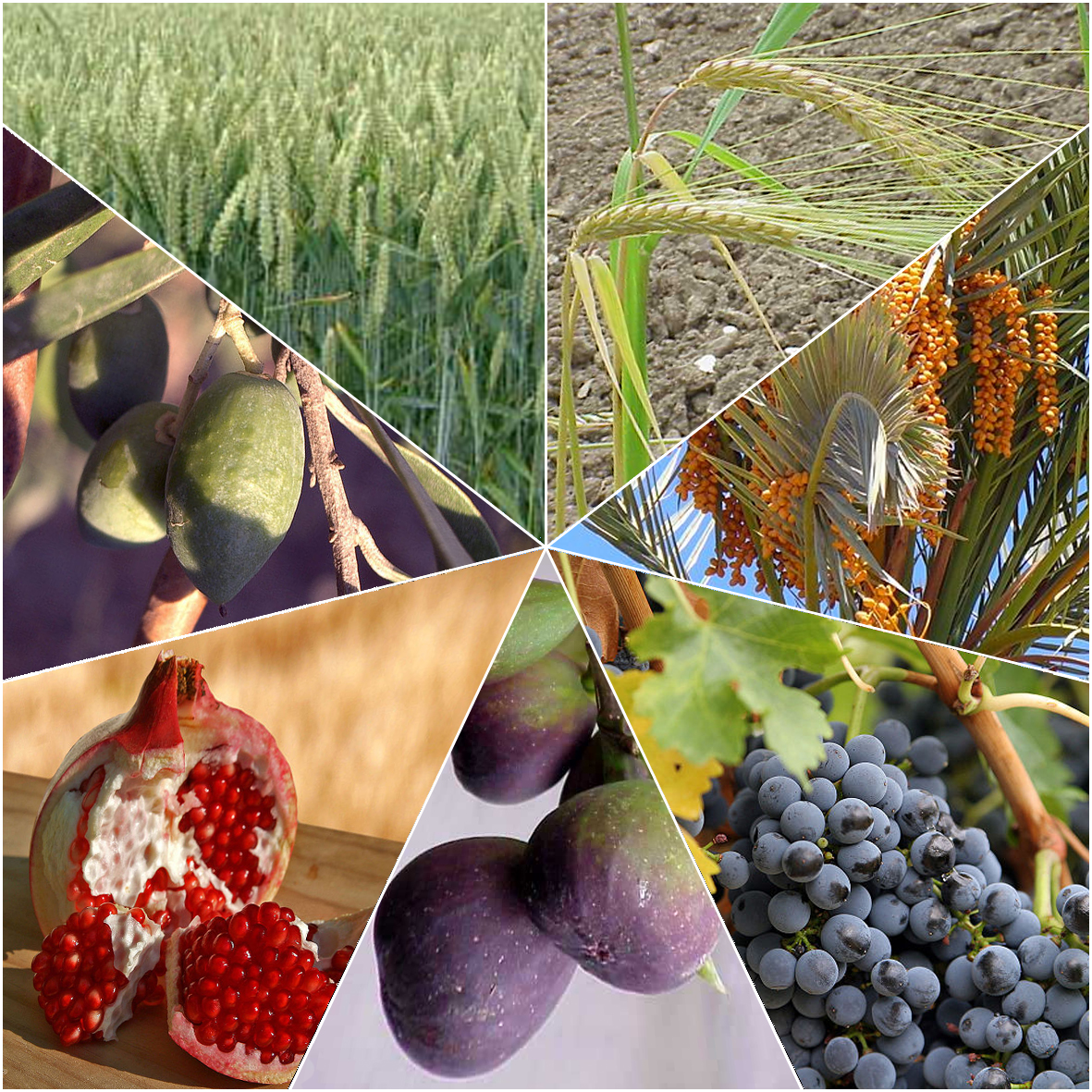
The Seven Species: From top left clockwise: Wheat, barley, dates, grape, fig, pomegranates, and olive

The Seven Species (Hebrew: שִׁבְעַת הַמִינִים, romanized: Shiv'at HaMinim) are seven agricultural products—two grains and five fruits—that are listed in the Hebrew Bible as being special products of the Land of Israel.

The seven species listed are wheat, barley, grape, fig, pomegranates, olive (oil), and date (date honey) (Deuteronomy 8:8). Their first fruits were the only acceptable offerings in the Temple.

== History ==
The Seven Species have played an important role in the food of the Israelites in the Land of Israel and the religious traditions of Judaism.

Many references to these basic foods can be found in the Bible. The Mishna states that only first fruits of the Seven Species could be brought to the Temple in Jerusalem as offerings. Wheat fields, vineyards and olive groves are still a salient feature of the Israeli landscape today. Figs, olives, pomegranates and dates are common ingredients in the cuisine of Israel.

=== Wheat ===
The ancient Israelites cultivated both wheat and barley. These two grains are mentioned first in the biblical list of the Seven Species of the land of Israel and their importance as food in ancient Israelite cuisine is also seen in the celebration of the barley harvest at the festival of Passover and of the wheat harvest at the festival of Shavuot.

=== Barley ===
A hardy cereal that has coarse bristles coming from the ears. It is widely cultivated, mainly for use in brewing and stockfeed.

=== Grapes ===
Grapes were used mainly for the production of wine, although they were also eaten fresh and dried.

=== Figs ===
Figs were cultivated throughout the Land of Israel and fresh or dried figs were part of the daily diet. A common way of preparing dried figs was to chop them and press them into a cake. Figs are frequently mentioned in the Bible (for example, 1 Samuel 25:18, 1 Samuel 30:12 and 1 Chronicles 12:41).

=== Pomegranates ===
Pomegranates were usually eaten fresh, although occasionally they were used to make juice or wine, or sun-dried for use when the fresh fruit was out of season. They probably played a minor part in Israelite cuisine, but were symbolically important, as adornments on the hem of the robe of the high priest and the Temple pillars, and embossed on coinage.

=== Olives ===
The olive was a major element in the seven species. Olive oil was used not only for food and for cooking, but also for lighting, sacrificial offerings, ointment, and anointment for priestly or royal office.

=== Dates ===
Dates were eaten fresh or dried, but were used mostly boiled into a thick, long-lasting syrup called "date honey" (dvash temarim) for use as a sweetener. The honey in the Biblical reference of "a land flowing with milk and honey" (for example, Exodus 3:8) is generally interpreted to be date honey.

== As a reference for measurements ==
The size of various measurements are tied to the specific amounts and sizes of Halachic objects. For example, the minimum width of Tefillin straps is known by law given to Moses at Sinai to be the size of a grain of barley. Alike, other fruits are used for measuring. Talmud scholars use the verse of Seven Species as a hint for all the measures using fruit sizes.

== Modern significance ==
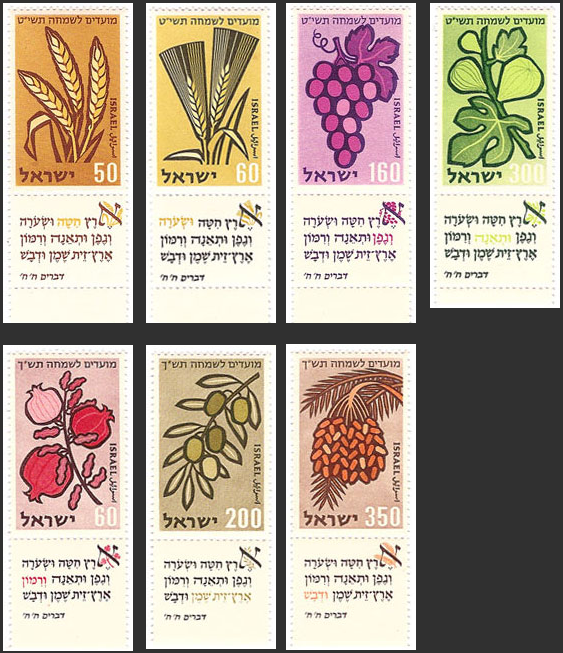
The Seven Species as depicted by Zvi Narkiss on a set of Israeli postage stamps (top row issued in 1958, bottom row issued in 1959). The Biblical verse on the extension of all seven stamps is from Deuteronomy 8:8.

The seven species are traditionally eaten on Tu Bishvat, the Jewish "New Year for Trees"; on Sukkot, the "Festival of Booths"; and on Shavuot, the "Festival of Weeks". In halakha (Jewish law), they are considered more important than other fruits, and a special berakhah (blessing) is recited after eating them. Additionally, the blessing prior to eating them precedes those of other food items, except for bread. The seven species are all important ingredients in Israeli cuisine today.

Deuteronomy 8:8 is prominently inscribed (in the Latin Vulgate translation: Terram Frumenti Hordei, ac Vinarum, in qua Ficus et Malogranata et Oliveta Nascuntur, Terram Olei ac Mellis) on the dome of California Tower at Balboa Park in San Diego, California, referring to the species' importance in California agriculture.

== See also ==
- Ancient Israelite cuisine – From the Iron Age to the Roman period
- Jewish cuisine – Jewish culinary traditions
- Olives and olive trees in Israel and Judaism
