= Biblical garden =

Garden featuring plants mentioned in the Bible

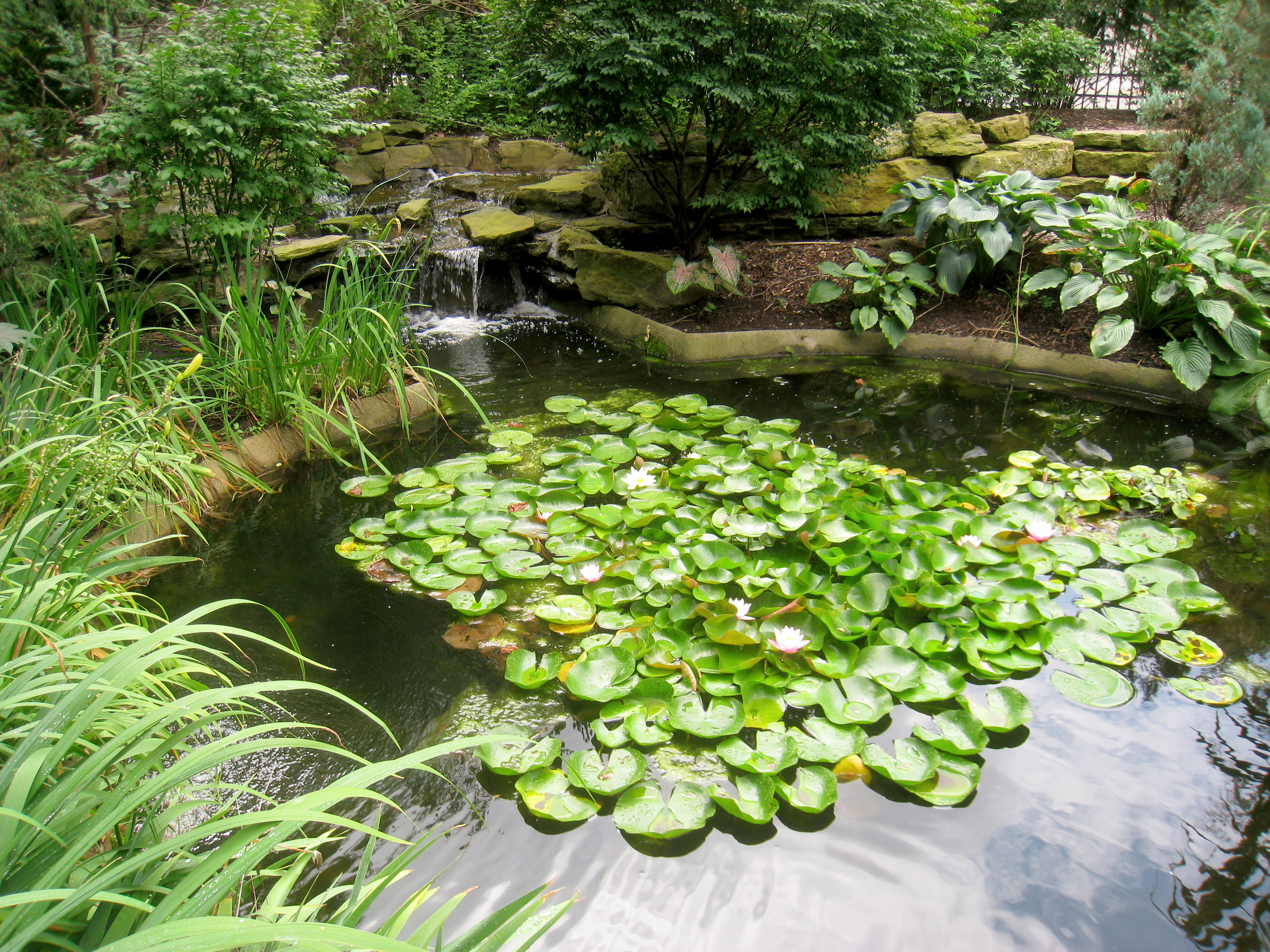
Biblical gardens contain plants mentioned in the Jewish or Christian scriptures.

Biblical gardens are cultivated collections of plants that are named in the Bible. They are a type of theme garden that botanical gardens, public parks, and private gardeners maintain. They are grown in many parts of the world, with many examples far from the Levant, including the Seinan Gakuin University Biblical Botanical Garden in Fukuoka, Japan, and the Missouri Botanical Garden in St. Louis, Missouri, in the United States.

A list of plants in the Bible includes species of plants mentioned in the Jewish and Christian scriptures. There is considerable uncertainty regarding the identity of some plants mentioned in the Bible, so some Biblical gardens may display more than one candidate species. Other plants with associations to the themes and subjects of the Bible are sometimes also included, especially in areas with different climates. Additionally, some gardens exhibit objects to illustrate Biblical stories or to demonstrate how people lived in Biblical times.

== Noteworthy Biblical gardens ==
=== Australia ===
- Bell Biblical Garden and Church Murals
- Charles Sturt University Bible Garden
- Palm Beach Bible Garden

=== Israel ===
- Yad Hashmona Biblical Garden
- Neot Kedumim
- Jerusalem Botanical Gardens

=== Europe ===
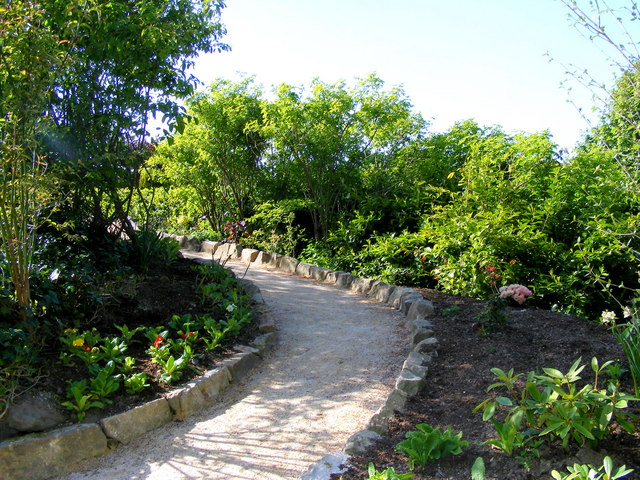
Biblical Garden Elgin, Scotland.

- Elgin Cathedral
- Le Jardin du Livre - Valff, France
- St Mary's Church Burnley

=== United States ===
- Huntsville Botanical Garden, Huntsville, Alabama
- Rodef Shalom Biblical Botanical Garden, Pittsburgh, Pennsylvania
- Warsaw, Indiana
- San Francisco Botanical Garden
- Missouri Botanical Garden
- Fair Haven Biblical Garden, Fair Haven, Vermont
- Cathedral of Saint John the Divine, New York
- Tree of Life Garden, Valley Center, California
- Museum of the Bible, Washington, D.C., rooftop garden

=== Japan ===
- Seinan Gakuin University Biblical Botanical Garden

== Gallery ==
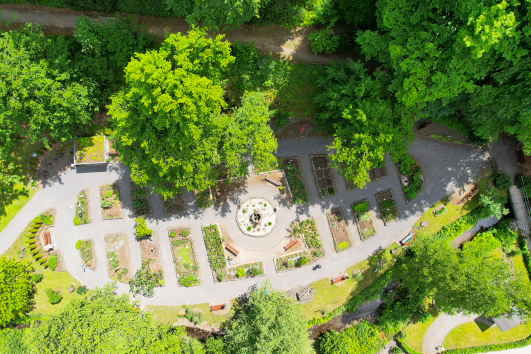
Aerial view of a garden in Weltersbach, Germany.

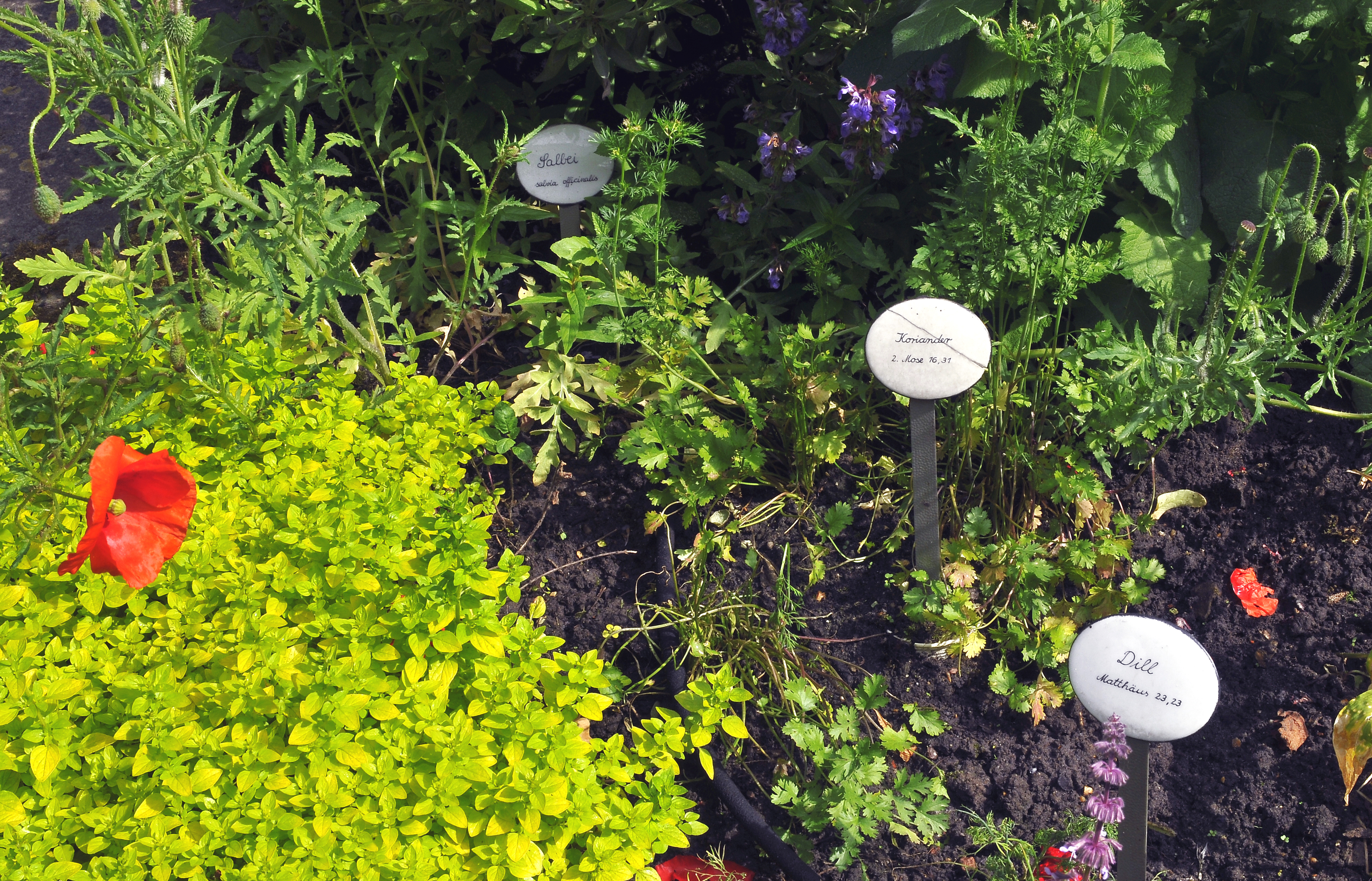
Gardens usually contain the scripture passage with the plant name.

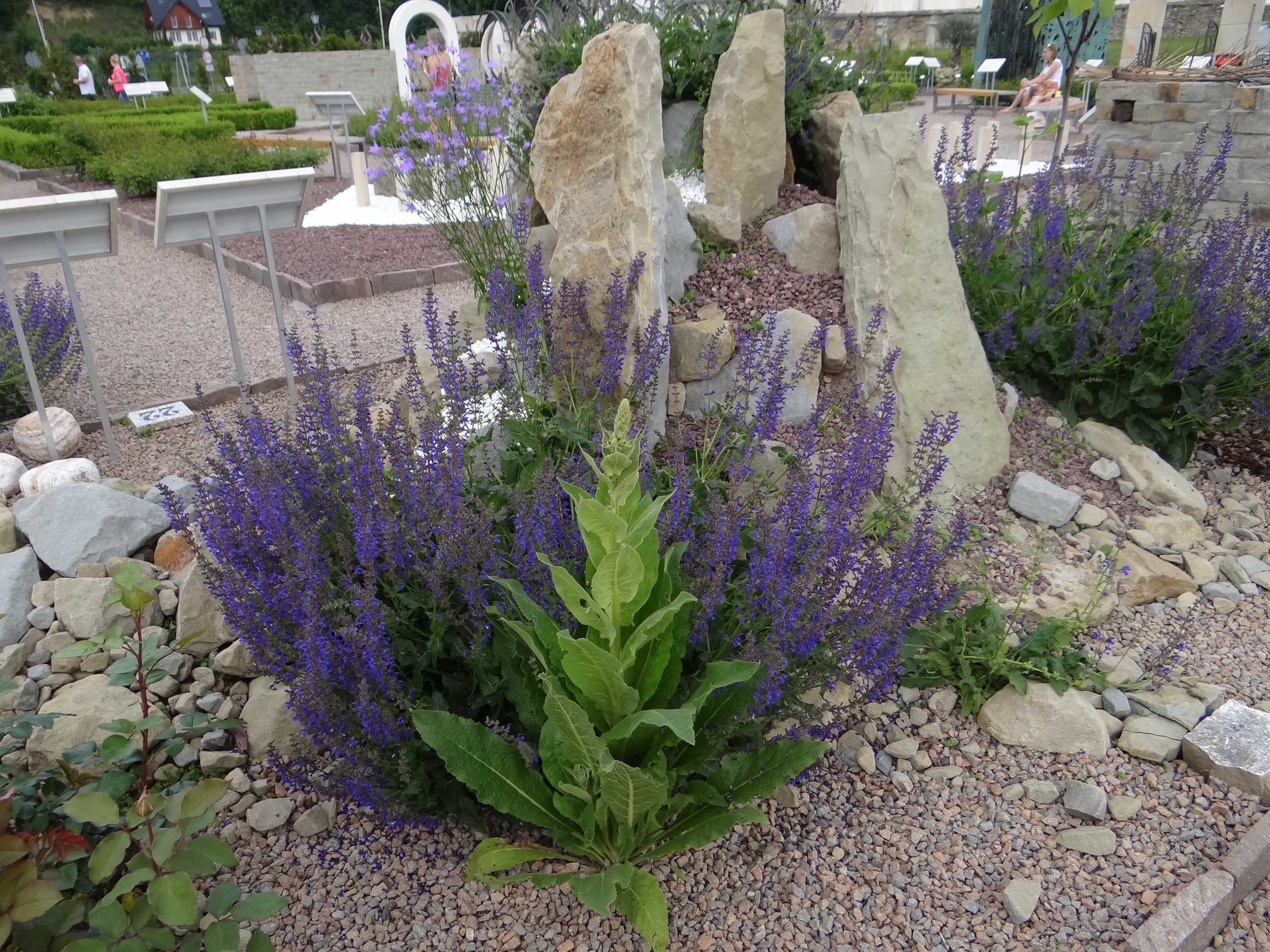
Biblical garden in Muszyna, Poland.

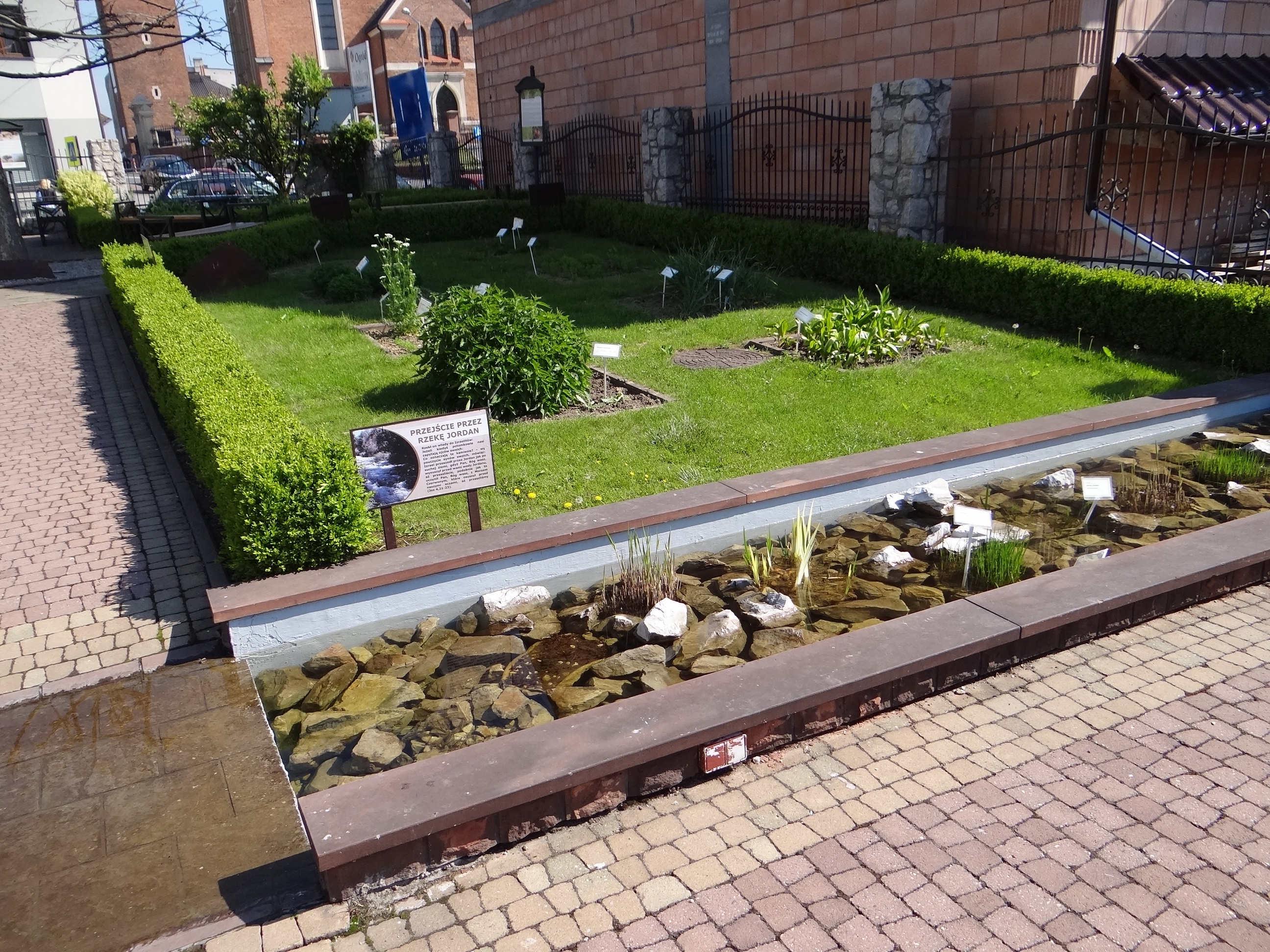
Garden located in Proszowice County, Poland.

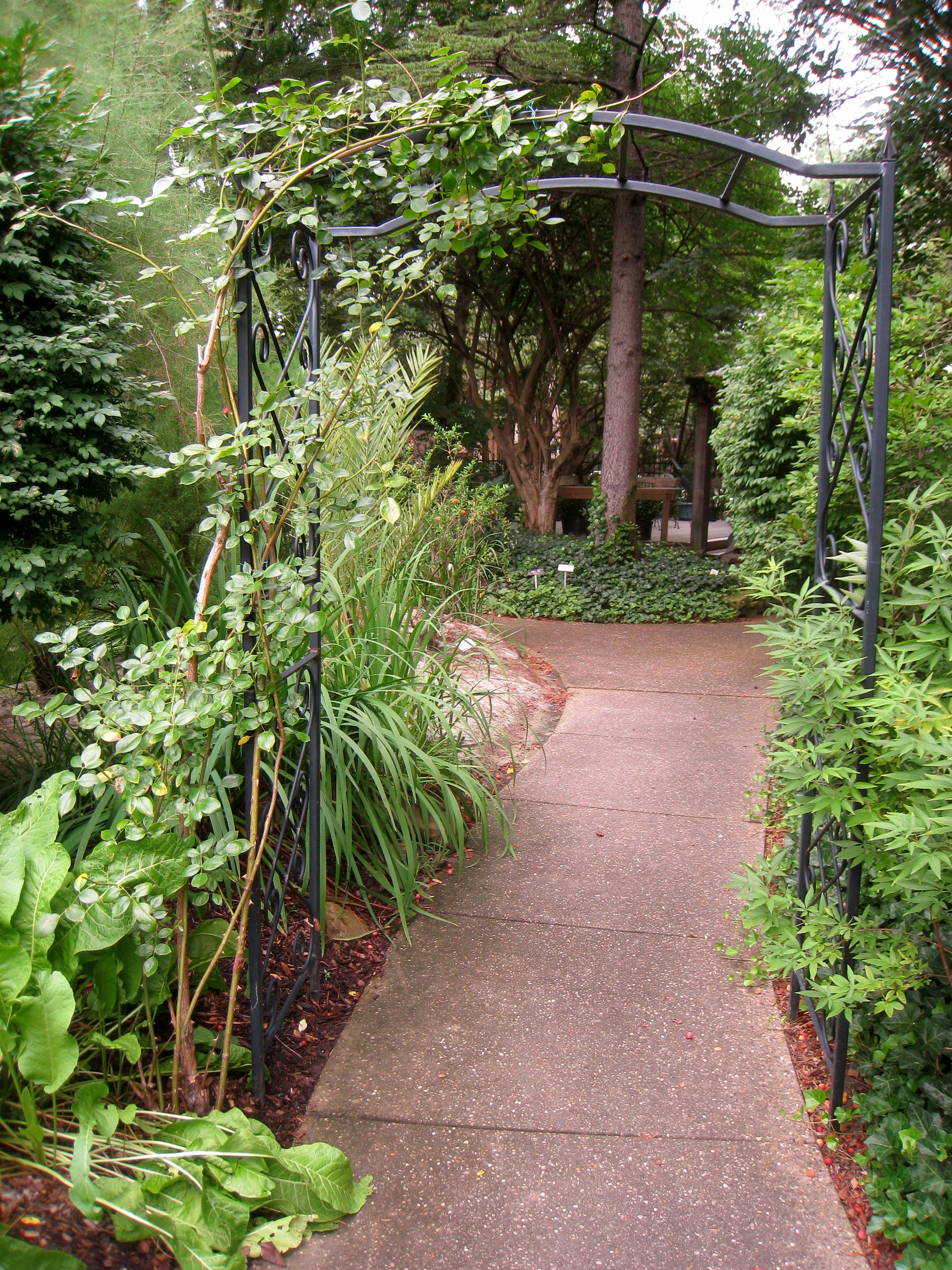
Rodef Shalom Biblical Botanical Garden, United States.
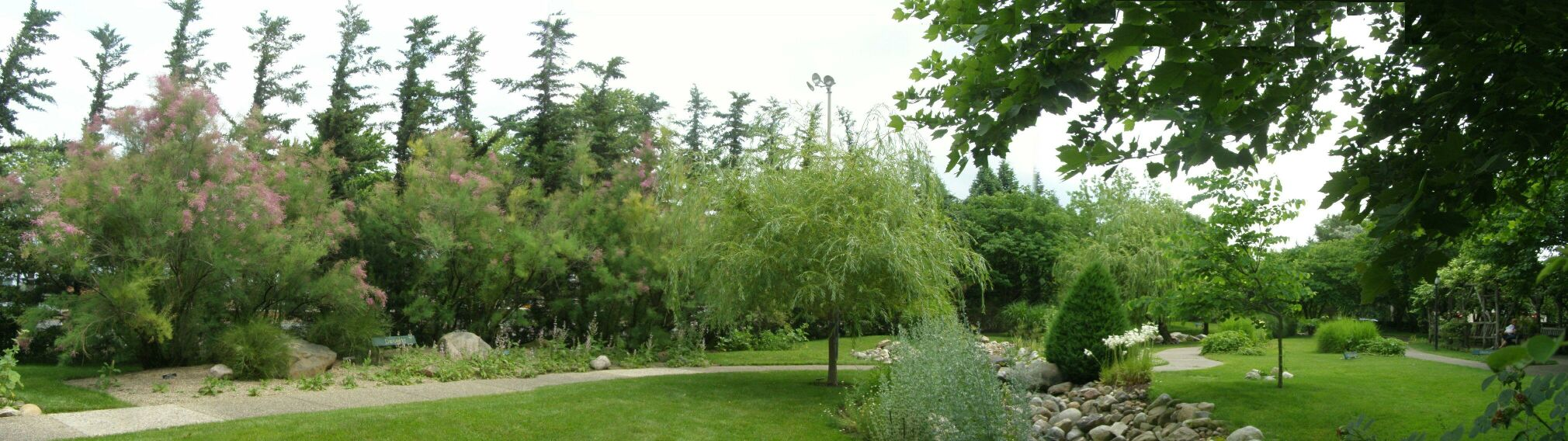
Biblical Garden, Indiana, United States
