= Tomaccio =

Tomato variety

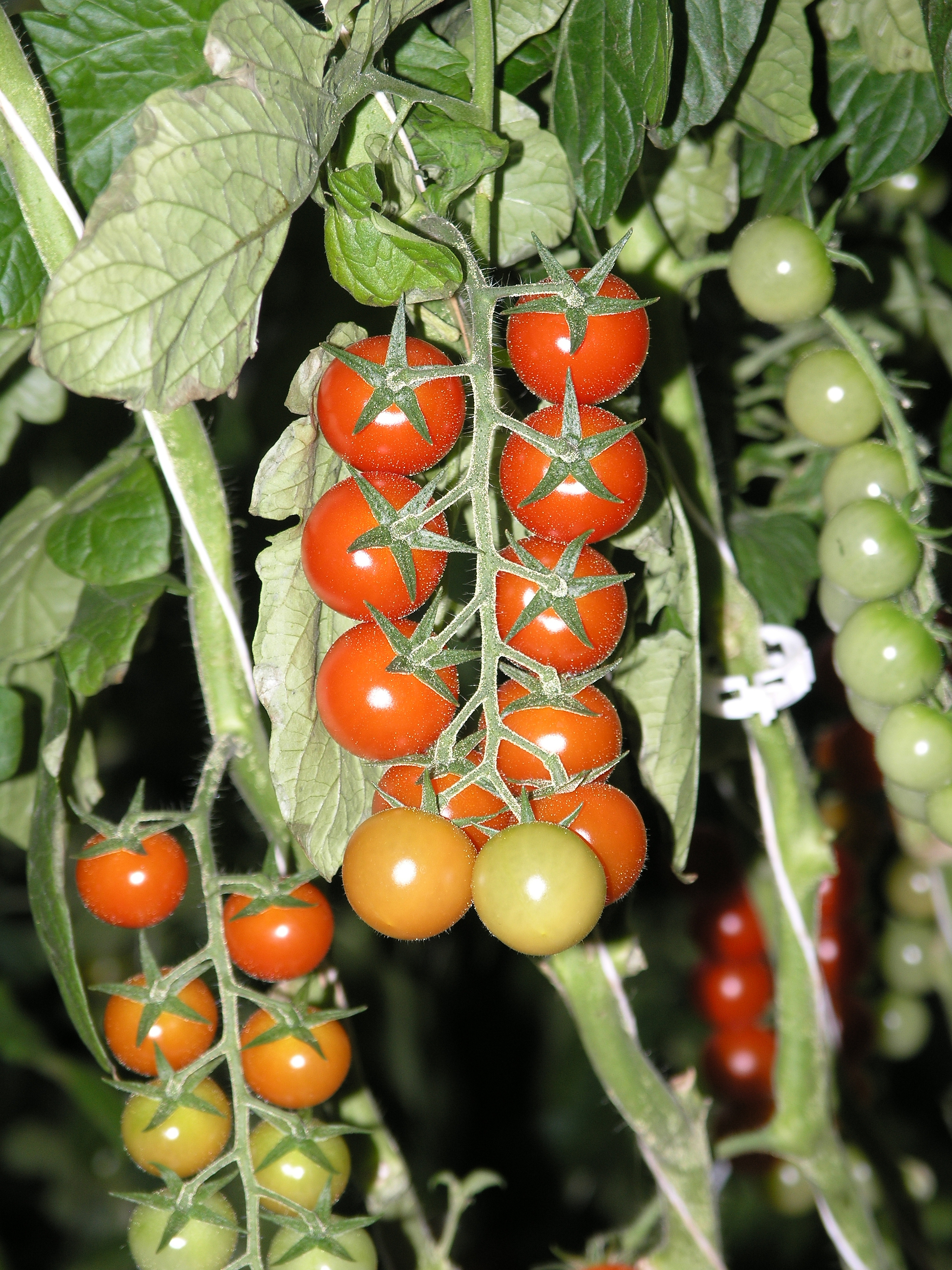
- Genus: Solanum
- Species: Solanum lycopersicum
- Cultivar: Tomaccio
- Marketing names: Sweet raisin tomato
- Breeder: Hishtil
- Origin: Israel

Tomaccio tomatoes resulted from a 12-year breeding program using a wild Peruvian tomato species. The program was developed by Hishtil in Israel. Tomaccio is a vigorous, high yielding, early fruiting cherry tomato bred primarily for the sun-dried tomato market.
