= Rodef Shalom Biblical Botanical Garden =

Botanical garden in Pittsburgh, Pennsylvania, United States

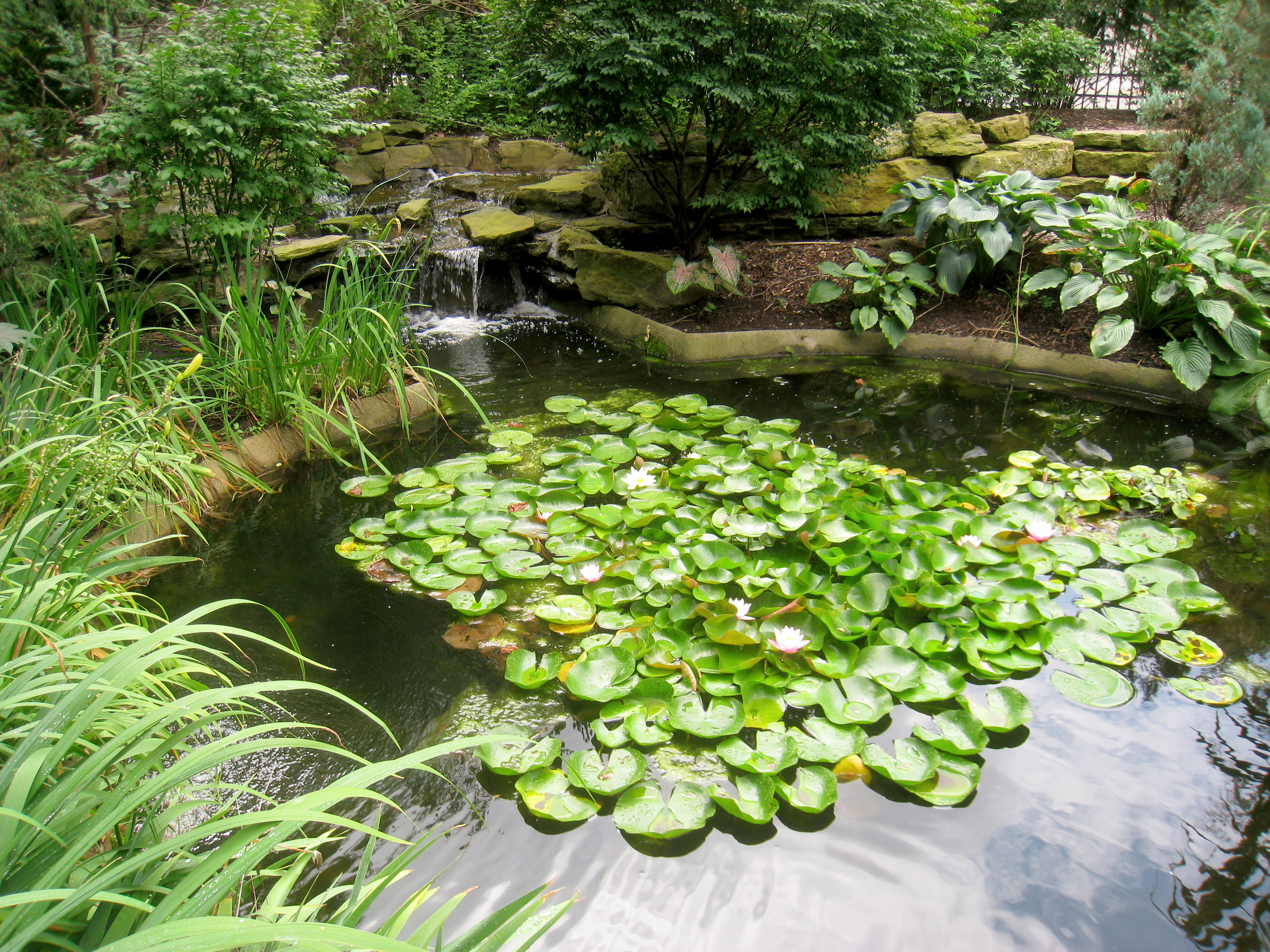

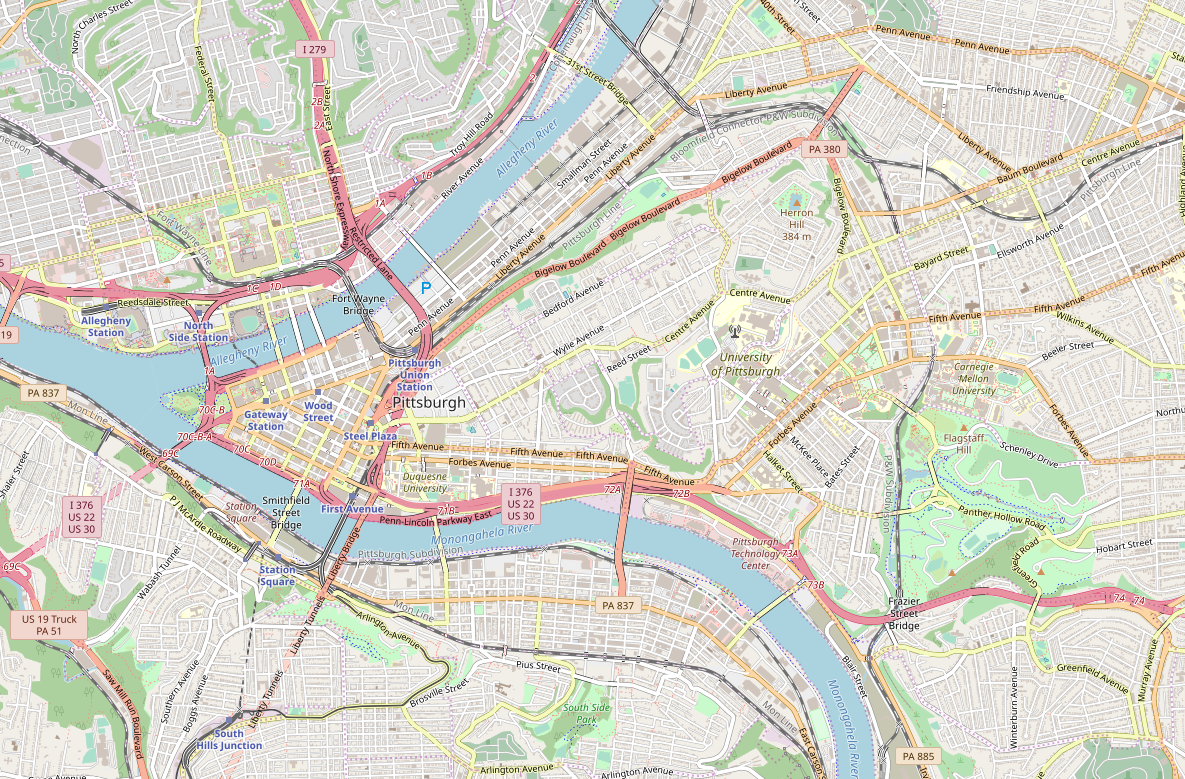
- Location within Downtown Pittsburgh
- Type: Biblical garden
- Location: Pittsburgh, Pennsylvania
- Coordinates: 40°26′51″N 79°56′38″W
- Area: 0.3 acres (0.12 ha)
- Created: 1987
- Website: www.rodefshalom.org/garden

The Rodef Shalom Biblical Botanical Garden (0.3 acres) in Pittsburgh, Pennsylvania's Shadyside section is a Biblical botanical garden.

Opened and free to the public since 1987 from June 1 through September 15. It was founded by Rabbi Walter Jacob and his wife horticulturalist Irene Jacob. It now displays more than 100 plants once grown in ancient Israel, including cedars, dates, figs, olives, and pomegranates. All are labeled with biblical verses, or their biblical name. The garden also includes a waterfall, desert, and a representation of the Jordan River from the Sea of Galilee to the Dead Sea. It produces a new show on ancient Near Eastern horticulture each summer.

The garden is on the grounds of the Rodef Shalom Congregation, which houses Western Pennsylvania's oldest Jewish congregation, dating back to the 1840s.

== See also ==
- List of botanical gardens in the United States
