= Rosa hybrida =

Rosa hybrida or Rosa × hybrida can refer to the following plant species:

- Rosa hybrida E.H.L.Krause, an unplaced name
- Rosa hybrida F.Dietr., a synonym of Rosa bipinnata Dum.Cours., an unplaced name
- Rosa × hybrida Schleich., a synonym of Rosa × polliniana Spreng.
- Rosa hybrida (Ser.) Posp., a synonym of Rosa gallica L.
- Rosa hybrida Tratt., an unplaced name
- Rosa hybrida Vill., a synonym of Rosa pendulina L.

== See also ==
- Hybrid tea rose
