= Ancient Israelite cuisine =

From the Iron Age to the Roman period

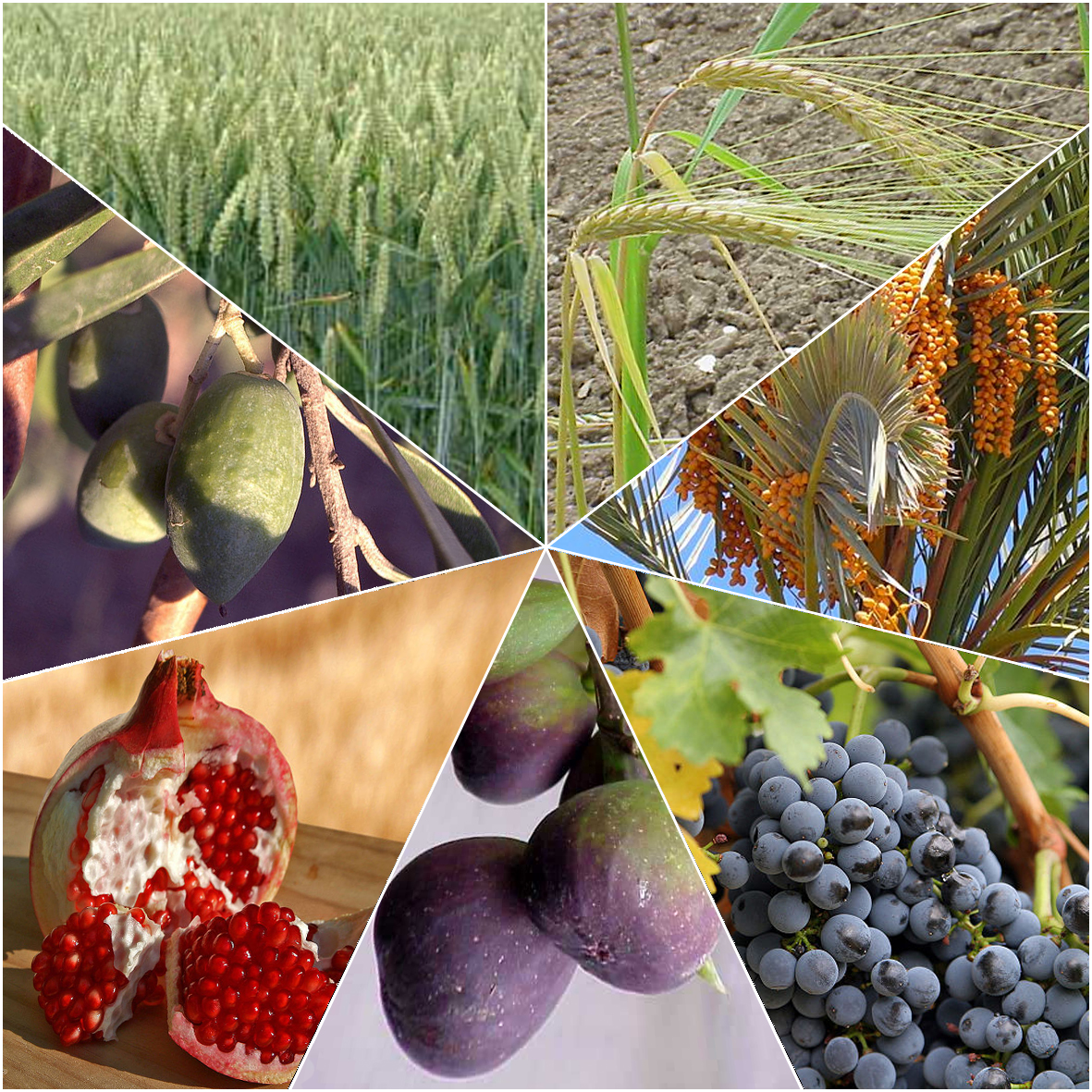
The Seven Species, which the Hebrew Bible lists as special agricultural products of the Land of Israel (clockwise from right): dates, grapes, figs, pomegranates, olives, wheat, and barley.

Ancient Israelite cuisine was similar to other contemporary Mediterranean cuisines. Dietary staples were bread, wine, and olive oil; also included were legumes, fruits and vegetables, dairy products, and fish and other meat. Importance was placed on the Seven Species, which are listed in the Hebrew Bible as being special agricultural products of the Land of Israel.

Like many cultures, the Israelites abided by a number of dietary regulations and restrictions that were variously unique or shared with other Near Eastern civilizations. These culinary practices were largely shaped by the Israelite religion, which later developed into Judaism and Samaritanism. People in ancient Israel generally adhered to a particular slaughter method and only consumed from certain animals, notably excluding pigs and camels and all predators and scavengers, as well as forbidding blood consumption and the mixing of milk and meat. There was a considerable continuity in the main components of the diet over time, despite the introduction of new foodstuffs at various stages.

== Sources ==
Information about the food of the ancient Israelites is based on written sources, archaeological records and comparative evidence from the wider region of the ancient Levant. The primary written source for the period is the Hebrew Bible, the largest collection of written documents surviving from ancient Israel. Other texts, such as the Dead Sea Scrolls, apocryphal works, the New Testament, the Mishnah and the Talmud also provide information. Epigraphic sources include ostraca from Samaria and Arad.

The Bible provides names of plants and animals that were used for food, such as the lists of permitted and forbidden animals (for example, Leviticus 11 and Deuteronomy 14), and the lists of foods brought to the king’s table (for example, 1 Kings 5:2–3) or the foods that the Israelites are said to have longed for after leaving Egypt (Numbers 11:5). These lists indicate the potential foods that were available, but not necessarily how regularly the food was eaten or how significant it was in the cuisine, which needs to be derived from other sources.

Archaeological remains include the items used for the production of food, such as wine or olive presses, stone and metal implements used in the preparation of food, and amphorae, jars, storerooms and grain pits used for storage. Animal bones provide evidence of meat consumption, the types of animals eaten, and whether they were kept for milk production or other uses, while paleobotanical remains, such as seeds or other carbonized or desiccated plant remains provide information about plant foods.

Using both written and archaeological data, some comparisons can be drawn between the food of ancient Israel and its neighbors. Although there is much information about the foods of ancient Egypt and Mesopotamia, the inferences that can be made are limited due to differences in topography and climate; Israelite agriculture also depended on rainfall rather than the river-based irrigation of these two civilizations, resulting in the preference for different crops. Ugarit and Phoenicia were closer neighbors of ancient Israel, and shared a topography and climate similar to that of ancient Israel. Thus, conclusions about the food and drink in ancient Israel have been made with some confidence from this evidence.

== History ==
Significant milestones in the availability and development food production characteristic of Israelite cuisine occurred well before the Israelite period. On the other hand, vestiges of the cuisine and the practices associated with it continue to resonate in later Jewish cuisine and traditions that developed in Israel and Babylonia during the Talmudic period (200 CE-500 CE), and may still be discerned in the various culinary styles that have developed among Jewish communities since then.

=== Pre-Israelite period ===
Wild species of barley and emmer wheat were domesticated and cultivated in the Jordan River Valley as early as the 9th millennium BCE. Archaeologists have found the carbonized seeds of two kinds of primitive wheat, einkorn and emmer, and two-row barley, in the earliest levels of digs at Jericho, one of the first cities in the world.

During the Pottery Neolithic period (6000-4300 BCE), the development of pottery enabled people to produce portable containers for the transportation and storage of food, and an economy based on agriculture and herding developed. Archaeological evidence indicates that figs, lentils and broad beans were being cultivated from Neolithic times. During the Chalcolithic period (4300-3300 BCE), large pottery containers, indicative of settled peoples, appear in the archaeological record. Date palm cultivation began in the Jordan River Valley, and the earliest date pits have been discovered at Ein Gedi by the Dead Sea. In the Golan, olives trees were grown and olive oil was produced there.

Chickpea cultivation dates back to the Bronze Age (3300 – 1200 BCE) and grapes and olives became important crops in the hill country. Wine and oil were traded for wheat with the cities on the coastal plain, and for meat and skins with semi-nomadic herders. Wine and carobs were also exported to Egypt during this period. At Arad in the northern Negev, the remains of wheat, barley and legumes have been found, along with stone-lined storage pits for grain from this period. Pottery was imported from Cyprus and Mycenae in Greece for the first time, probably for use as good-quality tableware. After the Bronze Age collapse of urban culture, there was an increase in herding and the disappearance of smaller agricultural communities.

=== Israelite period ===
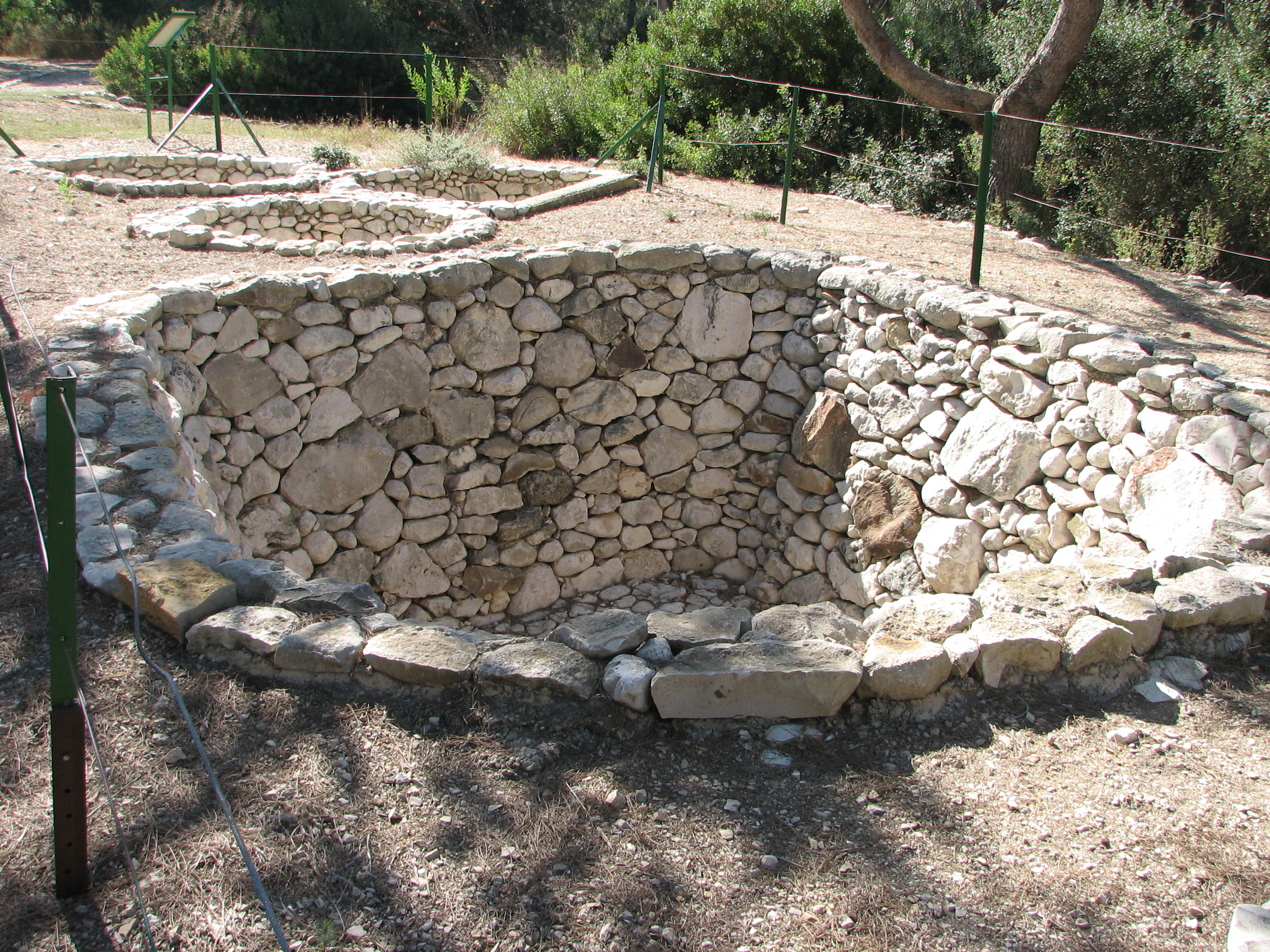
Granaries from an Iron-Age Israelite fortress in the Negev, reconstructed at Derech Hadorot, Hecht Museum, Haifa.

The Israelite presence emerged during the Early Iron Age (1200-1000 BCE), at first in the central hill country, Transjordan and the northern Negev, and later in the Galilee, while the Philistines and other Sea Peoples arrived at roughly the same time and settled in the coastal regions. Pastoralism and animal husbandry remained important, and walled open spaces in villages that probably served as paddocks have been discovered. The construction of terraces in the hills, and of additional plastered cisterns for water storage, enabled more cultivation than before. Storage pits and silos were dug into the ground to hold grain. Under the united Israelite monarchy, central store cities were built, and greater areas of the northern Negev came under cultivation. The Gezer agricultural calendar, detailing the crops that were raised, dates from this period.

After the division of the Israelite kingdom, Jerusalem and a number of other cities expanded, supported by the surrounding villages and farms. These were called “daughters of” the major towns in the Hebrew Bible (for example, Josh 17:11 and Josh 15:47). Large food storage facilities and granaries were built, such as the city of Hazor. During the later Iron Age (Iron Age II) period, roughly the same period as the Israelite and Judean monarchies, olive oil and wine were produced on a large scale for commerce and export, as well as for local consumption.

The ancient Israelites depended on bread, wine and oil as the basic dietary staples and this trio is often mentioned in the Bible (for example, Deut 7:13 and 2 Kings 18:32) and in other texts, such as the Samaria and Arad ostraca. Written and archaeological evidence indicate that the diet also included other products from plants, trees and animals. Seven basic agricultural products, called the Seven Species, are listed in the Bible: wheat, barley, figs, grapes, olives, pomegranates, and dates (Deut 8:8). The Bible also often describes the land of Israel as a land "flowing with milk and honey" (for example, Exod 3:8).

The cuisine maintained many consistent traits based on the main products available from the early Israelite period until the Roman period, even though new foods became available during this extended time. For example, rice was introduced during the Persian era; during the Hellenistic period, as trade with the Nabateans increased, more spices became available, at least for those who could afford them, and more Mediterranean fish were imported into the cities; and during the Roman period, sugar cane was introduced.

=== Post-Temple period ===
The symbolic food of the ancient Israelites continued to be important among Jews after the destruction of the Second Temple in 70 CE (AD) and the beginning of the Jewish Diaspora. Bread, wine, and olive oil were seen as direct links to the three main crops of ancient Israel—wheat, grapes, and olives. In the Bible, this trio is described as representing the divine response to human needs (Hosea 2:23–24) and particularly the need for the seasonal rains vital for the successful cultivation of these three crops. (Deuteronomy 11:13–14). The significance of wine, bread and oil is indicated by their incorporation into Jewish religious ritual, with the blessings over wine and bread for Shabbat and holiday meals and at religious ceremonies such as weddings, and the lighting of Shabbat and festival lights with olive oil.

== Characteristics ==
The daily diet of the ordinary ancient Israelite was mainly one of bread, cooked grains, and legumes. Bread was eaten with every meal. Vegetables played a smaller, but significant role in the diet. Legumes and vegetables were typically eaten in stews. The Israelites drank goat and sheep’s milk when it was available in the spring and summer, and ate butter and cheese. Honey, both from bees and date honey, was also eaten. Figs and grapes were the fruits most commonly eaten, while dates, pomegranates, and other fruits and nuts were eaten more occasionally. Wine was the most popular beverage and sometimes other fermented beverages were produced. Meat, usually goat and mutton, was eaten rarely by most Israelites and was reserved for special occasions such as celebrations, festival meals, or sacrificial feasts. However, goat meat was consumed more than sheep meat since sheep were valued. The wealthy ate meat, including beef and venison, more frequently. Olives were used primarily for their oil, which was used raw and to cook meat and stews. Game, birds, eggs, and fish, especially fresh and saltwater fish, were also eaten, depending on availability. Non-kosher fish consumption was also very common until the first century CE.

Most food was eaten fresh and in season. Fruits and vegetables had to be eaten as they ripened and before they spoiled. People had to contend with periodic episodes of hunger and famine; producing enough food required hard and well-timed labor, and the climatic conditions resulted in unpredictable harvests and the need to store as much food as possible. Thus, grapes were made into raisins and wine; olives were made into oil; figs, beans, and lentils were dried; and grains were stored for use throughout the year.

An Israelite meal is illustrated by the biblical description of the rations that Abigail brought to David's group: bread loaves, wine, butchered sheep, parched grain, raisins, and fig cakes (1 Samuel 25:18).

== Foods ==
=== Grains and bread ===
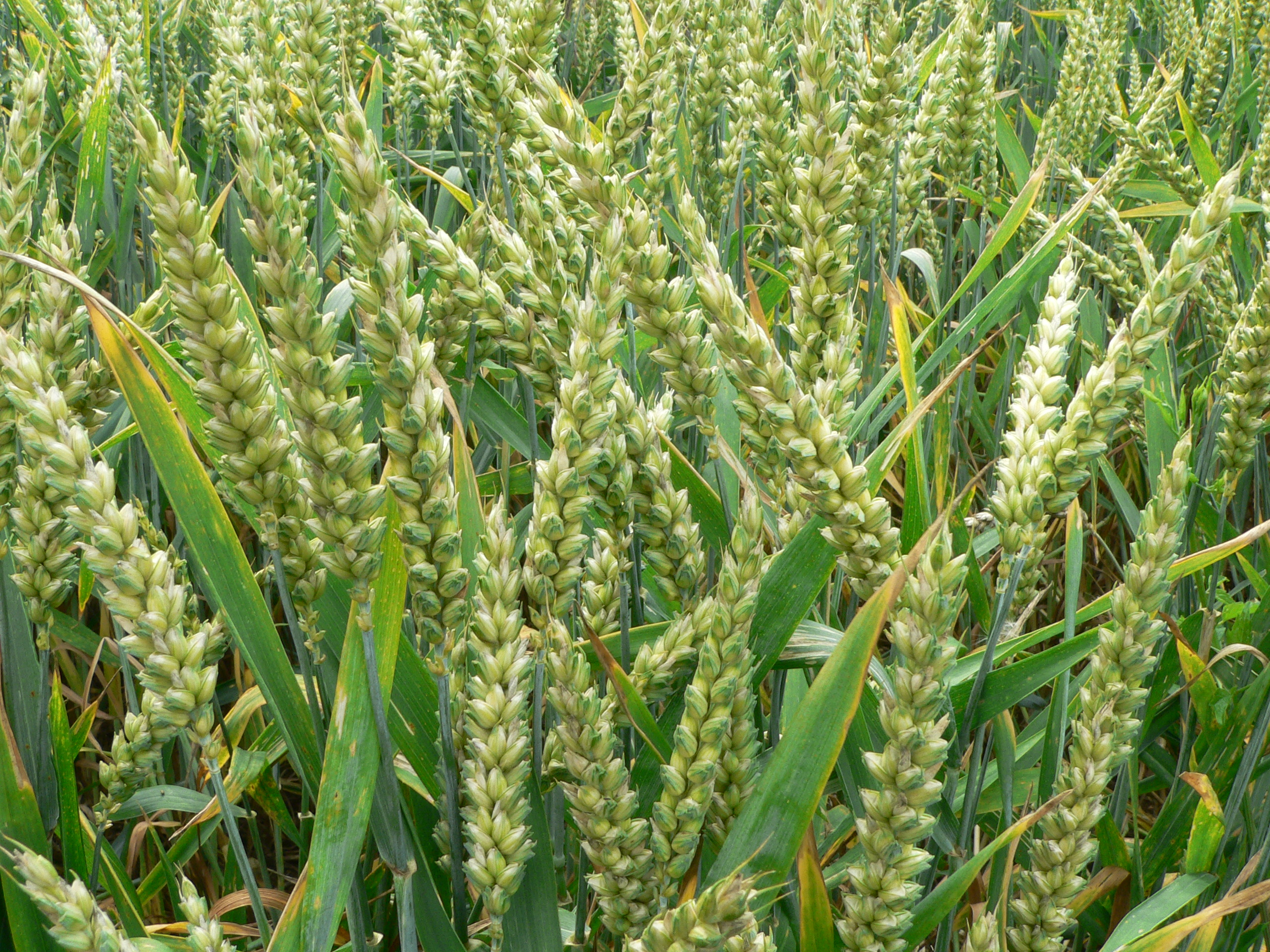
Durum wheat was the wheat most commonly grown in ancient Israel

Grain products constituted the majority of the food consumed by the ancient Israelites. The staple food was bread, and it was such a vital part of each meal that the Hebrew word for bread, lehem, also referred to food in general. The supreme importance of bread to the ancient Israelites is also demonstrated by how Biblical Hebrew has at least a dozen words for bread, and bread features in numerous Hebrew proverbs (for example, Proverbs 20:17, Proverbs 28:19). Bread was eaten at just about every meal and is estimated to have provided from 50 to 70 percent of an ordinary person’s daily calories. The bread eaten until the end of the Israelite monarchy was mainly made from barley flour; during the Second Temple period, bread from wheat flour become predominant.

Porridge and gruel were made from ground grain, water, salt, and butter. This mixture also formed the basis for cakes, to which oil, called shemen, and fruits were sometimes added before baking.

The Israelites cultivated both wheat and barley; these two grains are mentioned first in the biblical list of the Seven Species of the land of Israel and their importance as food is also seen in the celebration of the barley harvest at the festival of Shavuot and of the wheat harvest at the festival of Sukkot.

Rice was introduced during the early Second Temple period through contact with the Persians. By the Roman period, rice had become an important export, and the Jerusalem Talmud states about rice that “there is none like it outside Israel,” and that notable rabbis served rice at the Passover seder.

==== Barley ====
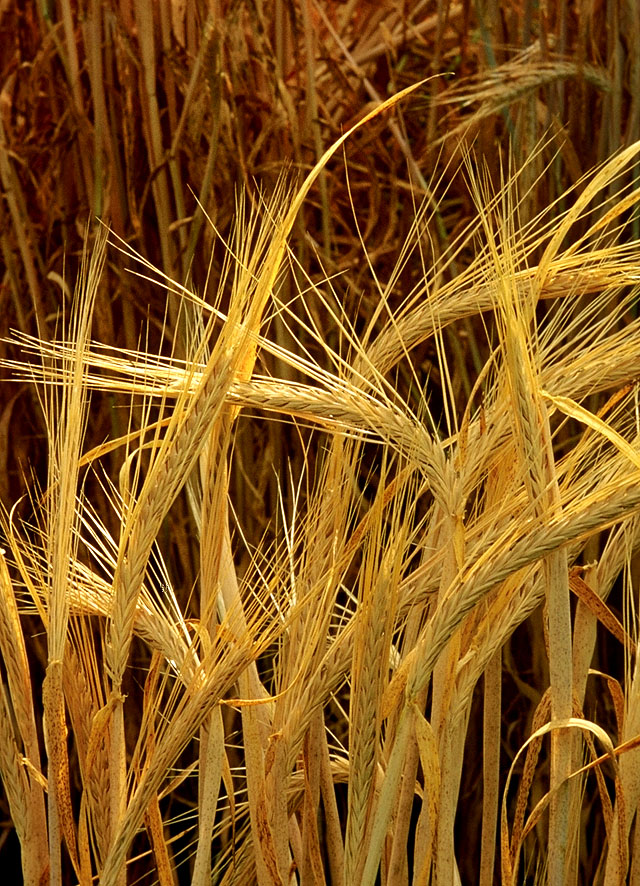
Barley was the grain most commonly used to make into flour for bread in Iron-Age Israel.

Barley (hordeum vulgare) was the most important grain during the biblical period, and this was recognized ritually on the second day of Passover in the Omer offering, consisting of barley flour from the newly ripened crop. Furthermore, its significance to Israelite society, not only as a source of food, is illustrated by the biblical method for measuring a field by the amount of barley (rather than of wheat) with which it could be sown.

Barley was initially predominant because it matured earlier and tolerated harsher conditions than wheat, growing in areas with less rainfall and poorer soils, such as northern Negev and the hill country. It had high yield potential and was resistant to insect infestation. It could be sown without plowing and could therefore be grown on small plots of land that oxen or even donkeys could not reach, and it did not need artificial irrigation. It ripened a month earlier than wheat and was thus available to replenish supplies used up during the winter sooner than wheat, and also provide some food security if the more vulnerable wheat crop was poor or failed. Two varieties of barley were cultivated: two-rowed, and six-rowed. Two-rowed barley was the older, hulled form; six-rowed barley was unhulled and easier to thresh, and, since the kernels remained intact, store for longer periods. Hulled barley was thus the prevalent type during the Iron Age, but gruels made from it must have had a gritty taste due to the barley’s tough outer layers.

Bread was primarily made from barley flour during the Iron Age (Judges 7:13, 2 Kings 4:42), as barley was more widely and easily grown, and was thus more available, cheaper, and could be made into bread without a leavening agent even though wheat flour was regarded as superior. It was presumably made from dough that was a simple mixture of barley flour and water, divided into small pieces, formed by hand into round shapes, then baked. However, barley declined as the staple from the biblical period to a poverty food by the end of the Second Temple period, and by the Talmudic era, it was regarded mostly as animal fodder.

==== Wheat ====
Emmer wheat (Triticum dicoccum) was initially the most widespread variety of wheat, as it grew well in the warm climate and was resistant to fungal rot. It was high yielding, with large grains and relatively high amounts of gluten, and bread made from emmer wheat flour was thus fairly light in texture. However, emmer required time-consuming pounding or roasting to remove its husk, and during the Iron Age, durum wheat (Triticum durum), a descendant of emmer, gradually replaced emmer and became the favored grain for making fine flour. Durum grew well in the rich soil of the larger valleys of the central and northern areas of the country, where rainfall exceeded 225 millimeters per year, was higher yielding than emmer, and its grains released more easily from the chaff. It could therefore be separated from the husk without roasting or pounding first, thus reducing the work required for threshing, and also leaving most of the grains whole, which was better for longer storage.

However, durum is a hard grain and was difficult to grind with the early hand-held grindstones. The flour also had to be sifted repeatedly to obtain fine flour (such as the solet required in the Temple offerings). Thus, durum was primarily used for porridges, or parboiled and dried, or roasted and boiled, and barley flour continued to be used for making bread until another hybrid of emmer, common or "bread" wheat (Triticum aestivum) replaced barley as the primary grain after the Greek conquest of the land of Israel; this together with durum wheat, became widespread during the Greco-Roman period, constituting the bulk of the grain crop by the end of the Second Temple period. The introduction of common wheat, which contained more starch and had a higher level of gluten, spread the use of wheat for bread-making and led to the production of loaves that were more lightly textured than barley and durum wheat breads.

==== Preparation of grains ====
A series of developments in technology for threshing, milling, and baking improved both the quantity and the quality of the grain and the means for preparation that were available from the beginning of the Iron Age until the end of the Second Temple period. In the early Iron Age, grain was threshed to remove it from the stalks by beating it with sticks or by oxen treading on it. This usually broke most of the grain kernels, which limited their storage time because broken kernels spoil more quickly than unbroken ones. The development of the threshing-board, which was pulled over the stalks by oxen, left most of the grain kernels intact and enhanced their storage time. Numerous threshing floors and threshing boards have been discovered at archaeological sites of ancient Israel.

Once separated from the stalks, the grain was used in a number of ways: Most simply, unripe kernels of grain were eaten fresh, particularly in the spring, before ripe grain was available, and both unripe and ripe grain was roasted over fire for immediate use. Ripe grains of wheat were also parboiled and dried, like modern bulgur, and then prepared as porridge. Whole or cracked grain was also used in stews and to make gruel. Most frequently, grains were ground into flour to prepare bread.

==== Production of bread ====
Bread was the main source of nourishment in biblical times, and making bread was a daily activity:

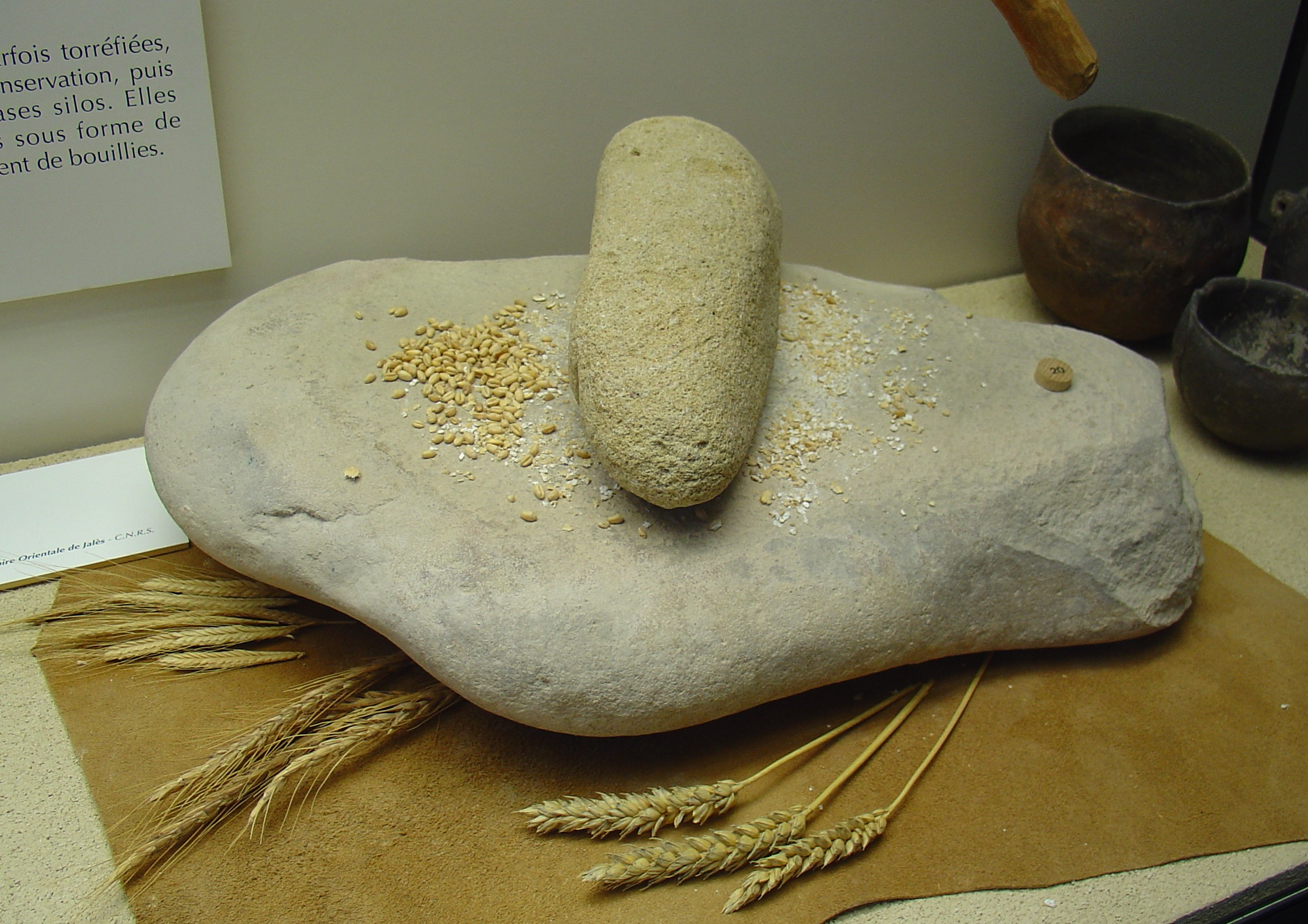
An upper hand stone was used to grind grain on the lower quern stone.

Bread-making began with the milling of the grain. It was a difficult and time-consuming task performed by women. Each household stored its own grain, and it is estimated that it required at least three hours of daily effort to produce enough flour to make sufficient bread for a family of five. The earliest milling was performed with a pestle and mortar, or a stone quern consisting of a large lower stone that held the grain and a smooth upper stone that was moved back and forth over the grains (Numbers 11:8). This often left small pieces of grit in the flour. The use of the millstone became more widespread during the Iron Age, resulting in greater speed and increased production of flour. Smaller versions for household use, the rotary or beehive quern, appeared during the early Persian period. After the grain was milled into flour, it was mixed with water and kneaded in a large trough. For dough made with wheat flour, starter, called seor, was added. The starter was prepared by reserving a small portion of dough from a previous batch to absorb the yeasts in the air and thus help leaven the new dough. Seor thus gave the bread a sourdough flavor.

Once prepared, the dough could be baked in various ways: Originally, the dough was placed directly on the heated stones of a cooking fire or in a griddle or pan made of clay or iron (Leviticus 7:9). In the time of the First Temple, two types of oven were used for baking bread: the jar-oven, and the pit-oven. The jar-oven was a large pottery container, narrowing into an opening toward the top; fuel was burned on the inside to heat it and the dough was pressed against the outside to bake. The pit-oven was a clay-lined excavation in the ground in which the fuel was burned and then pushed aside before the loaves were baked on the heated surface. People also began placing a convex dome, initially earthenware and later metal, over the pit-oven and cooking the flatbreads on the dome instead of on the ash-covered surface; this type of oven is probably what was meant by the biblical machabat, often translated as "griddle".

The Persians introduced a clay oven called a tanur (similar to the Indian tandoor), which had an opening at the bottom for the fire, and through which the bread was placed to be baked on the inner wall of the upper chamber from the heat of the oven and ashes after the flames had died down. This continued to be the way in which Yemenite Jews baked bread until modern times. The remains of clay ovens and fragments of bread trays have been found in several archaeological excavations. All these methods produced only thin loaves, and the custom was thus to break bread rather than cut it. The bread was soft and pliable and used for dipping and sopping up gravies and juices.

The Romans introduced an oven called a furn (purni in Talmudic Aramaic), a large, wood-burning, stone-lined oven with a bottom on which the dough or baking sheet was placed. This provided a major advance in bread and pastry baking, and made the baking of much thicker loaves possible.

A variety of breads were produced. Probably most common were unleavened flat loaves called ugah or kikkar. Another type was a thin wafer, known as a rakik. A thicker loaf, known as hallah, was made with the best-quality flour, usually for ritual purposes.

Bread was sometimes enriched by the addition of flour from legumes (Ezekiel 4:9). The Mishna (Hallah 2:2) mentions bread dough made with fruit juice instead of water. The sugar in the juice, interacting with the flour and water, provided some leavening and sweetened the bread. The Israelites also sometimes added fennel and cumin to bread dough for flavor and dipped their bread in vinegar (Ruth 2:14), olive oil, or sesame oil for extra flavor.

=== Legumes ===
After grain, legumes such as lentils, broad or fava beans, chickpeas, and peas were the main element in the diet and were the main source of protein, since meat was rarely eaten.

Broad beans, chickpeas, and lentils are the only legumes mentioned in the Bible but lentils, broad beans, chickpeas, fenugreek, field peas and bitter vetch have been found at Iron Age Israelite sites. By the Roman period, legumes are mentioned frequently in other texts. They are cited as one of the elements of the “wife’s food basket” in the Mishna (Ketubot 5:8), by which it is estimated that legumes supplied 17% of daily calories at that time.

Lentils were the most important of the legumes and were used to make pottages and soups, as well as fried lentil cakes called ashishim, such as those that King David is described as distributing to the people when the Ark of the Covenant was brought to Jerusalem. According to Tova Dickstein, a researcher at Neot Kedumim in Israel, ashishim were honey-dipped pancakes made from crushed red lentils and sesame seeds.

Stews made of lentils or beans were common and they were cooked with onion, garlic, and leeks for flavor. Fresh legumes were also roasted, or dried and stored for extended periods. They were then cooked in a soup or a stew. The Bible mentions roasted legumes (2 Samuel 17:28), and relates how Jacob prepared bread and a pottage of lentils for Esau (Genesis 25:29–34).

=== Vegetables and fruits ===
Vegetables are not found often in the archaeological record, and it is difficult to determine the role that they played, because plant foods were often eaten raw or were simply boiled, without requiring special equipment for preparation, and thus barely leaving any trace other than the type of food itself.

Vegetables also are not mentioned often in the written record, and when the Bible does mention them, the attitude is mixed: sometimes they are regarded as a delicacy, but more often, they were held in low esteem (for example, (Proverbs 15:17, Daniel 1:11–15).

Vegetables were perhaps a more important food at the extremes in society: the wealthy who could afford to dedicate land and resources to grow them, and the poor who depended on gathering them in the wild to supplement their meager supplies. More people may have gathered wild plants during famine conditions.

Vegetables that were commonly eaten included leeks, garlic, onions, black radishes, melons (sometimes misidentified as the cucumber) and watermelons. Other vegetables played a minor role in the diet of the ancient Israelites. Field greens and root plants were generally not cultivated and were gathered seasonally when they grew in the wild. Leafy plants included dandelion greens and the young leaves of the orach plant.

Leeks, onions, and garlic were eaten cooked in stews, and uncooked with bread, and their popularity may be indicated by the observation in the Bible that they are among the foods that the Israelites yearned for after leaving Egypt.

Gourds and melons were eaten raw or flavored with vinegar. Black radishes were also eaten raw when in season during the autumn and winter. The Talmud mentions the use of radish seeds to produce oil and considered eating radishes to have health benefits.

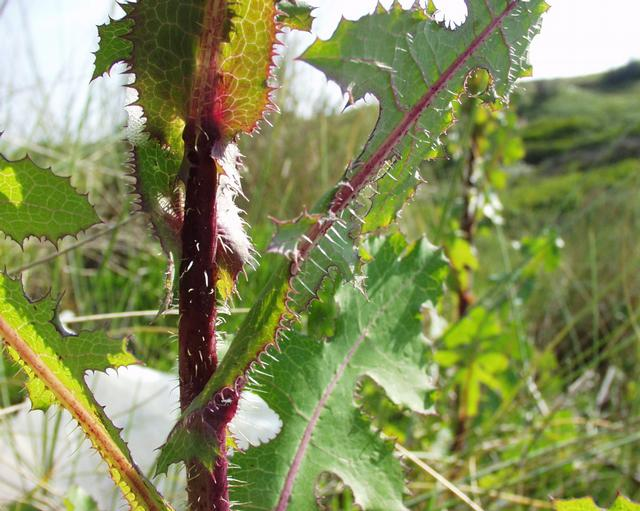
Wild lettuce, or chazeret, was eaten as a bitter herb at the Passover meal

Wild herbs were collected and eaten uncooked or cooked. These are known to have included garden rocket and mallow, and both leaf chicory and endive.

Wild lettuce, known as chazeret, was a leafy herb with prickly, red tinged leaves that became bitter as they matured. It was cultivated from around 800 BC. Sweeter head-lettuce was only developed and introduced by the Romans.

Bitter herbs eaten at the Passover sacrifice with the unleavened bread, matza, were known as merorim. Chazeret is listed in the Mishna (Pesahim 2:6) as the preferred bitter herb for this Passover ritual, along with other bitter herbs, including chicory or endive (ulshin), horehound (tamcha), reichardia or eryngo (charchavina), and wormwood (maror).

Mushrooms, especially of the Boletus type, were gathered in many areas, particularly when plentiful after a major rainfall. The Talmud mentions mushrooms in connection with their exemption from tithes and as a dessert at the Passover seder.

Sesame seeds were used in the preparation of oil, were eaten dry, or were added to dishes such as stews as a flavoring; the leftovers after pressing out the oil were eaten in a cake form. The Hebrew for sesame, shumshum, is related to the Akkadian samassammu, meaning "oil plant", as the seeds contain about 50% oil, which was pressed from the seeds. Sesame is not mentioned in the Bible, but the Mishna lists sesame oil as suitable for lighting the Sabbath lights, and the oil was also used for frying.

Fruit was an important source of food for the Israelites, particularly grapes, olives, and figs. Grapes were grown mostly for wine, although some were eaten fresh at harvest time, or dried as raisins for storage, while olives were grown exclusively for their oil, until the Roman period. Other fruits that were eaten were the date, pomegranate, and sycamore fig.

==== Cultivation of land ====
The ancient Israelites built terraces of leveled areas in the hill country for planting a variety of crops, including grains, vegetables, and fruit trees. All the trees, with the exception of the olive, produced fruit that could be eaten fresh or juiced while in season. Fruit was also processed for later use in a variety of ways: fruit with high sugar content was fermented to make alcoholic beverages; grapes were most commonly used for this. Fruit was also boiled down into thick, sweet syrup, referred to in the Bible as dvash (honey). Grapes, figs, dates, and apricots were also dried and preserved individually, put on a string, or pressed into cakes. Since dried fruit is an efficient source of energy, such were prepared as provisions for journeys and long marches.

=== Nuts and special fruits ===
The sycamore fig, carob, mulberry, and possibly the apple were also eaten. Usually, these fruits were not cultivated but were picked in the wild when they were in season. The sycamore fig (Ficus sycamorus) was very common in the warmer parts of Israel and was grown primarily for its wood, but it provided a steady supply of small figs, eaten mainly by the poor.

Other native trees producing fruits included the carob, which was probably popular due to its sweet taste, and the black mulberry. The tapuah, which means "apple" in modern Hebrew, is mentioned in the Bible, but it is not clear if this referred to another fruit, such as the apricot or quince.

Almonds, walnuts, and pistachios were eaten and are mentioned in the Bible. Almonds were widespread in the region from prehistoric times, and the Bible mentions almonds (shaked) and pistachios (botnim) as among the "choice fruits of the land" sent by Jacob as a gift to the ruler of Egypt (Genesis 43:11). Almonds and pistachios were probably eaten primarily by the wealthy. The walnut reached Israel from Mesopotamia by at least 2000 BCE and is mentioned once in the Bible (Song of Solomon 6:11). Walnuts became common during the Second Temple period and so widespread that the word for walnut, egoz, became the generic Hebrew word for nut at that time.

==== Olives ====
The olive is one of the biblical Seven Species and one of the three elements of the "Mediterranean triad" in Israelite cuisine. Olive oil was used not only as food and for cooking, but also for lighting, sacrificial offerings, ointment, and anointment for priestly or royal office.

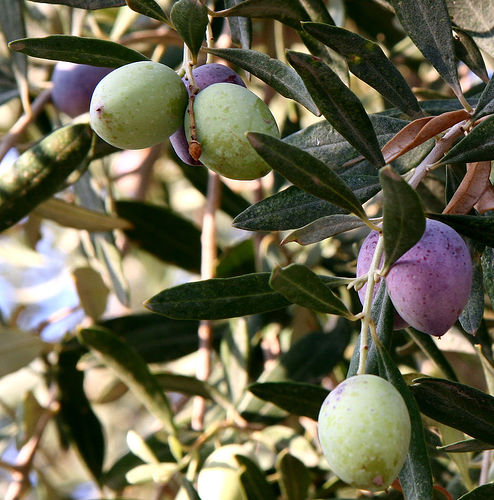
Olives were one of ancient Israel’s most important natural resources

The olive tree was well suited to the climate and soil of the Israelite highlands, and a significant part of the hill country was allocated to the cultivation of olive trees, which were one of ancient Israel’s most important natural resources. Olive oil was more versatile and longer-lasting than the oil from other plants, such as sesame, and was also considered to be the best-tasting.

Although olives were used to produce oil from the Bronze Age, it was only by the Roman period that the techniques were introduced to cure olives in lye and then brine to remove their natural bitterness and make them edible.

Olives were harvested in the late summer and were processed for oil by crushing them, pressing the mash, and separating the oil from the flesh. In the early Iron Age period, this was done by treading the olives in basins cut into rock, or with a mortar or stone on a flat slab. In the later Iron Age period, the introduction of the beam press made large scale processing possible.

The discovery of many ancient olive presses in various locations indicates that olive-oil production was highly developed in ancient Israel. The oil production center dating from the 7th century BC discovered at Ekron, a Philistine city, has over one hundred large olive presses and is the most complete olive oil production center from ancient times yet discovered. It indicates that ancient Israel was a major producer of olive oil for its residents and other parts of the ancient Near East, such as Egypt, and especially Mesopotamia. In addition to the large-scale olive oil production for commerce and export, presses have been found in ordinary houses, indicating that this was also a cottage industry.

Archaeological remains at Masada and other sites indicate that the most common olive cultivar was the indigenous Nabali, followed by the Souri. In Roman times, other olive cultivars were imported from Syria and Egypt.

There is also some written information about olive oil. The Bible describes its use in relation to certain sacrifices in which olive oil is used (for example, (Leviticus 6:13–14, Leviticus 7:9–12). However, these sacrificial "recipes" can be assumed to represent some of the everyday uses of oil and methods for cooking and frying. Olive oil was mixed with flour to make bread in the story of Elijah and the widow of Zarephath (1 Kings 17:12–13) and is also noted as a valuable product for eating (Ezekiel 16:13,19). Olive oil is also mentioned on the Samaria and Arad ostraca.

The consumption of olive oil varied with social class: it was less available to the poor, but it may have become more available later in the Israelite period as the means of production improved and became more widespread. By early Roman times, the Mishna indicates that it was one of the four essential foods that a husband had to provide his wife, and it has been calculated that at a minimum, this represented about 11 percent of the overall calories supplied by the "food basket" described at that time.

==== Grapes ====
Grapes are another of the biblical Seven Species and were used mainly for the production of wine, although they were also eaten fresh and dried. Grapes were dried in the sun to produce raisins, which could then be stored for a long time. Raisins were also pressed into clusters and dried as cakes, which kept the interior raisins softer.

Grapes were also used to produce a thick, honey-like liquid, called grape honey (dvash anavim), that was used as a sweetener. Grape honey was made by treading the grapes in vats, but instead of fermenting the liquid produced, it was boiled to evaporate its water, leaving behind the thick, grape syrup.

==== Figs ====
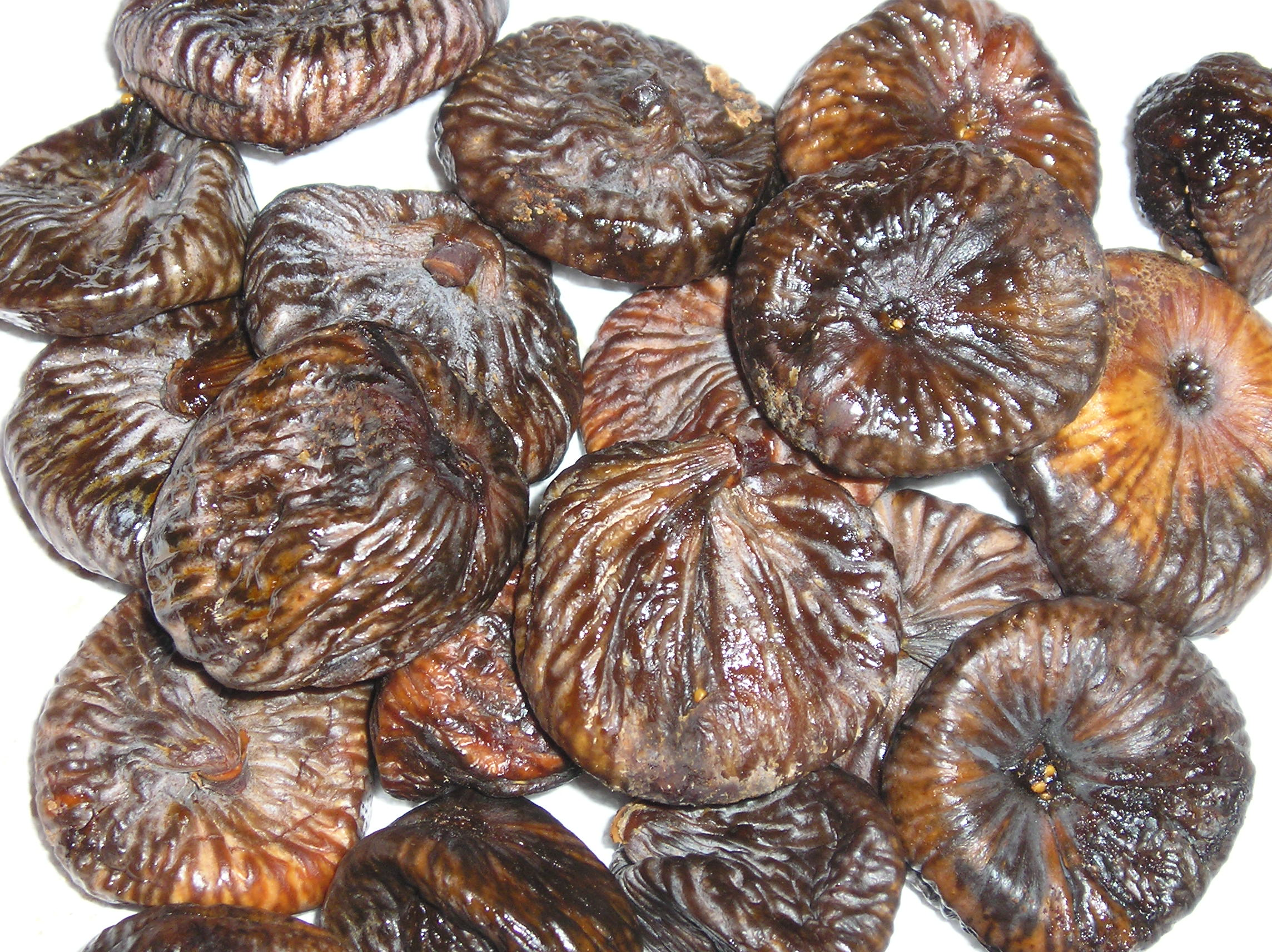
Dried figs were a significant source of winter food

Figs were an important source of food. Figs were cultivated throughout the land of Israel, and fresh or dried figs were part of the daily diet. A common way of preparing dried figs was to chop them and press them into a cake.

Figs are one of the biblical Seven Species and are frequently mentioned in the Bible (for example, 1 Samuel 25:18, 1 Samuel 30:12 and 1 Chronicles 12:41). The remains of dried figs have been discovered from as early as the Neolithic period in Gezer, Israel and Gilgal in the Jordan Valley.

The fig tree (ficus carica) grew well in the hill country and produced two crops a season. Early-ripening figs were regarded as delicacy because of their sweetness and were eaten fresh. Figs ripening in the later harvest were often dried and strung into a chain, or pressed into hard round or square-shaped cakes called develah and stored as a major source of winter food. The blocks of dried fig were sliced and eaten like bread. The Mishna mentions figs as one of the components of the prescribed "wife’s food basket" and they are estimated to have constituted 16% of the overall calories of the basket.

==== Dates ====
Dates were eaten fresh or dried, but were mostly boiled into thick, long-lasting syrup called "date honey" (dvash temarim) for use as a sweetener. This syrup was prepared by soaking the dates in water for some time until they disintegrated and then boiling the resulting liquid down into thick syrup. The honey in the Biblical reference of "a land flowing with milk and honey" is probably date honey.

Fresh, ripe dates were available from mid to late summer. Some were sun-dried and pressed into blocks to dry completely and then used throughout the year, especially as food for travelers. Dates were also fermented into one of the "strong drinks" referred to in the Bible as "shechar".

The date palm required a hot and dry climate and mostly grew and produced fruit in the Jordan Rift Valley from Jericho to the Sea of Galilee. In these arid areas, the date was sometimes the only plant-food available and was a primary component of the diet, but it was less important elsewhere.

==== Pomegranates ====
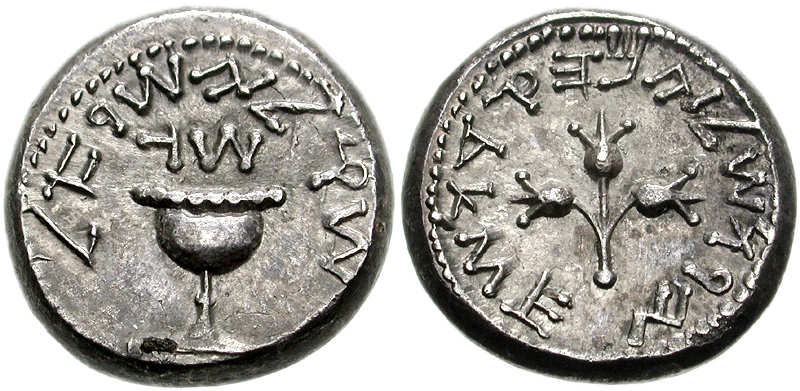
Silver half-shekel coins minted during the First Jewish-Roman War show three pomegranates on the reverse

Pomegranates were usually eaten fresh, although occasionally they were used to make juice or wine, or sun-dried for use when the fresh fruit was out of season. They probably played a minor part in Israelite cuisine but were symbolically important as adornments on the hem of the robe of the high priest and the Temple pillars and embossed on coinage; they are also listed in the Bible as one of the Seven Species of the Land of Israel.

=== Animal meat and by-products ===
The Israelites usually ate meat from domesticated goats and sheep. Goat’s meat was the most common. Fat-tailed sheep were the predominant variety of sheep in ancient Israel, but, as sheep were valued more than goats, they were eaten less often. The fat of the tail was considered a delicacy. Beef and venison were eaten primarily by the elites, and fattened calves provided veal for the wealthy (for example, as mentioned in the Bible, Amos 6:4).

For most people, meat was eaten only a few times a year when animals were slaughtered for the major festivals, or at tribal meetings, celebrations such as weddings, and for the visits of important guests (1 Samuel 28:24). Only at the king's table was meat served daily, according to the Bible. Although most meat was obtained from domesticated animals, meat from hunted animals was also sometimes available, as the story of Isaac and Esau (Genesis 27:3–4), certain Biblical lists (for example, Deuteronomy 14:5), and archaeological evidence indicate. The remains of gazelle, red deer, and fallow deer are the most commonly found in the archaeological record.

Archaeological evidence from an Iron-Age market excavated at Ashkelon shows that game was also sold to those who could not hunt or trap them themselves. However, meat from wild animals was more common at times of economic distress and in the northern areas, where forests and open land provided a habitat for more wild animals.

Meat was prepared in several different ways. The most common was to cook it with water as a broth or a stew (for example, Ezekiel 24:4–5). Meat stewed with onions, garlic, and leeks and flavored with cumin and coriander is described on ancient Babylonian cuneiform tablets, and it is most likely that it was prepared similarly in ancient Israel. Stewed meat was considered to be a dish worthy of serving to honored guests (Judges 6:19–20). A less common way to prepare meat was to roast it over an open fire, but this was done particularly for the meat of the Passover lamb. For long-term storage, meat was smoked, dried, or salted, according to indications in texts and ethnographic studies.

==== Poultry and eggs ====
The Israelites ate domesticated birds such as pigeons, turtledoves, ducks, and geese, and wild birds such as quail, and partridge. Remains from archaeological excavations at the Ophel in Jerusalem and other Iron-Age sites show that domestic birds were available, but consumption was small. The inclusion of pigeons and turtledoves in the Biblical sacrifice lists implies that they were raised domestically, and the remains of dovecotes discovered from the Greek and Roman periods confirm this. Biblical references and archaeological evidence also demonstrate that wild birds were hunted and eaten.

The turtledove was present from about April to October, while the rock pigeon was available throughout the year. The pigeon appears to have been domesticated in Sumeria and Canaan during the second millennium BC, and remained the predominant fowl in ancient Israel until the end of the Second Temple period. Nonetheless, to avoid the spread of disease, pigeons could only be raised in small numbers and were thus fairly costly and not a regular part of the diet.

Geese, originally domesticated in ancient Egypt, were raised in ancient Israel. They are most likely the "fattened fowl" on King Solomon’s table (1 Kings 5:3). Goose breeding is also discussed in the Mishna. Like other animals, birds were fattened for consumption on special occasions, and for the wealthy.

It is unclear when chicken became part of the diet. There are some archaeological remains from Iron-Age sites, but these were likely from roosters as a fighting bird, which are also pictured on seals from the period as a symbol of ferocity, such as on the 6th-century BC onyx seal of Jaazaniah. Chicken became common around the 2nd century BC, and during the Roman period, chickens emerged as an important feature of the cuisine, with the Talmud describing it as "the choicest of birds." By Roman times, pigeons and chickens were the principal poultry.

Until the domestication of the chicken, eggs were available in limited quantities and were considered a delicacy, as in ancient Egypt. The most common birds—turtledoves and pigeons—were reared for their meat and not for their very small eggs. Biblical references to eggs are only in reference to gathering them from the wild (for example, Deuteronomy 22:6–7 and Isaiah 10:14). Eggs seem to have increased in use for food only with the introduction of chickens as food and were commonly used as food by Roman times.

==== Fish ====
The Israelites ate a variety of fresh and saltwater fish, according to both archaeological and textual evidence. Remains of freshwater fish from the Yarkon and Jordan rivers and the Sea of Galilee have been found in excavations, and include St. Peter’s fish and mouthbreeders. Saltwater fish discovered in excavations include sea bream, grouper, meager, and gray mullet. Most of these come from the Mediterranean Sea, but in the later Iron Age period, some are from the Red Sea. Although the Torah prohibits the consumption of fish without fins or scales, archeological evidence indicates that many Israelites flouted or were unaware of these restrictions and ate non-kosher seafood, mostly catfish but also shark, eel, and ray, and that religious restrictions on seafood began to be observed more strictly starting in the first century CE.

Fishermen supplied fish to inland communities, as remains of fish, including bones and scales, have been discovered at many inland sites. To preserve them for transport, the fish were first smoked or dried and salted. Merchants also imported fish, sometimes from as far as from Egypt, where pickled roe was an export article. Remains of Nile Perch from Egypt have been found, and these must have been smoked or dried before being imported through the trade network that connected ancient Near Eastern societies. Merchants shipped fish to Jerusalem, and there was evidently a significant trade in fish; one of the gates of Jerusalem was called the Fish Gate, named for a fish market nearby (Zephaniah 1:10, Nehemiah 3:3, Nehemiah 12:39, Nehemiah 13:16, 2 Chronicles 33:14).

It is unclear to what extent fish played a role in the cuisine, but it is apparent that fish became steadily more available during the Israelite and Judean monarchies. Fish products were salted and dried and sent great distances. However, even in the later Persian, Greek, and Roman periods, the cost of preserving and transporting fish must have meant that only wealthier inhabitants of the highland towns and cities could afford it, or those who lived close to the sources, where it was less expensive. In the Galilee, small-scale fishing was a fundamental component of the agrarian economy.

==== Milk and dairy products ====
Goats, and, to a lesser extent, sheep, provided milk for part of the year, and milk and dairy products were a significant source of food. Dairy products are mentioned in the Bible (for example, Genesis 18:8, Judges 4:19, and 2 Samuel 17:29, and a repeated description of the Land of Israel in the Bible is "a land flowing with milk and honey" (for example, Exodus 3:8, Exodus 33:3, and Joel 4:18)).

Fresh milk could not be stored for long without spoiling. Typically, thick sour milk called laban was drunk because the Israelites stored the milk in skin containers, in which it curdled quickly.

Milk had to be processed to preserve it. This was done by first churning it, using a goatskin or clay container to separate the butterfat from the whey. The butterfat was processed by boiling and then cooling it to make clarified butter, which could then be stored for a long time. Clarified butter was used principally for cooking and frying. Butter churns have been excavated at Beersheba, dating from the 4th century BC, and other ancient Israelite sites.

Goat milk and sheep’s milk cheeses were the most prevalent types of cheese. Soft cheese was made using cloth bags filled with soured milk. The thin liquid was drained through the cloth until a soft cheese remained in the bag. A hard cheese was made from fermented soured milk: milk was poured into special moulds in which it curdled and was then hardened by drying in the sun or by heating numerous, small, cheese molds with holes for draining the whey. Cheese is not mentioned often in the Bible, but in one case, David is sent to take a gift of cheese to the commander of the army (1 Samuel 17:18). The Mishna and Talmud mention using the sap of fruit trees, such as figs, to harden cheese (a method still used by nomadic herders of the region until modern times). Using fig sap instead of animal enzymes to make cheese also conformed to the prohibition on mixing meat and milk.

==== Honey ====
Fruit syrup called dvash served as the primary sweetener and was most often made from dates. It was not until Talmudic times that the word "dvash" now translated as "honey", generally meant bee honey. The Biblical term dvash usually did not mean bee honey, but thick syrup obtained from grapes, figs, or dates. This syrup was similar to the date syrup, or halek, that many Jews continue to use in modern times.

The Biblical references to "honey from the crag" (Deuteronomy 32:13) or "honey from the rock" (Psalms 81:17) could refer either to fig honey, as fig trees commonly grew in rocky outcrops, or to honey collected from wild bees, which made their nests in these places, as they still do in the region until today. The Bible refers to honey from bees in only a few instances, for example, when Samson eats honey which bees made in the carcass of a lion (Judges 14:8–9) and when Jonathan eats honey from a honeycomb (1 Samuel 14:25–27), and these references are to honey obtained from the wild.

Nonetheless, the oldest archaeological find relating to beekeeping discovered to date is an apiary dating from about 900 BC at Rehov, a Bronze-Age and Iron-Age site in the Jordan Valley. The hives, made of straw and unbaked clay, could have housed more than a million bees, and indicate that honey was produced on a large scale. It is most likely that the inhabitants of Tel Rehov imported the bees from Anatolia, because they were less aggressive than the local bees and produced a higher yield of honey. It is also possible that the domestication of bees for honey production was introduced from Egypt during the Iron Age, and honey was being obtained from domesticated bees from late in the Iron Age period.

=== Seasonings ===
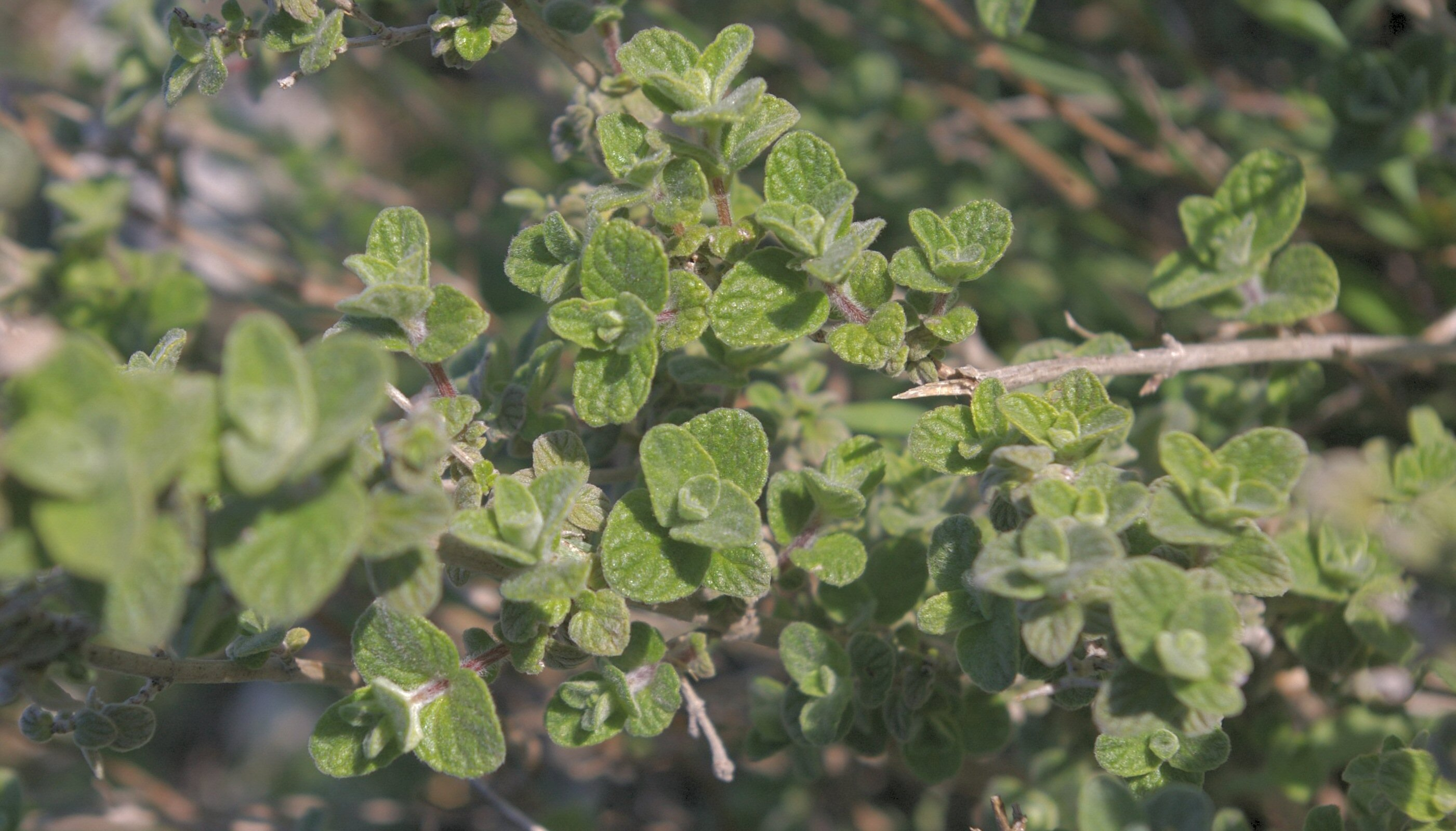
Hyssop, called ezov, was used as a seasoning.

The most common and important seasoning was salt (Job 6:6), demonstrated by how it is referenced throughout the Bible, and by how its use was mandated with most sacrifices (Leviticus 2:13). Salt was obtained from the Mediterranean or the Dead Sea. It was produced by evaporating seawater from both natural and artificially created drying pans along the Mediterranean coast. It was also obtained by mining salt deposits, such as at Sodom near the Dead Sea. Salt had to be transported to other locations, so most communities had to purchase it.

Food was also flavored by plants, most native to the region and either cultivated, or gathered in the wild, although a few spices were imported. Garlic, onions, and possibly fenugreek were used to season cooked foods, as well as being eaten as vegetables. Herbs and spices included capers, coriander, cumin, black cumin, dill, dwarf chicory, hyssop, marjoram, mint, black mustard, reichardia, saffron, and thyme. Some seasonings were imported, such as myrrh, galbanum, saffron, and cinnamon, but their high cost limited their widespread use. Spices for special feasts were imported by the wealthy and royalty from Arabia and India and were highly valued. These included various types of pepper, and ginger.

Another seasoning was vinegar, which was produced by extra fermentation of new wine. It was used for seasoning foods, pickling vegetables, and medicinal purposes.

== Drinks ==
=== Water, dairy, and juices ===
The Israelites usually drank water drawn from wells, cisterns, or rivers. They also drank milk (for example, as mentioned in the Bible in Judges 5:25), often in the form of sour milk, thin yogurt, or whey, when it was available in the spring and summer. They drank fresh juices from fruits in season as well. The most strongly preferred beverage was wine, although some beer may have also been produced, and wine was an important part of the diet and a source of calories, sugar, and iron. Making wine was also a practical way to preserve fruit juices for long-term storage. Usually, wine was made from grapes for everyday use, as well as for rituals, such as sacrificial libations. Less often, wine was made from pomegranates and dates.

=== Alcoholic beverages ===
==== Wine ====
The Mediterranean climate and soil of the mountainous areas of the area are well suited to viticulture, and both archaeological evidence and written records indicate the significant cultivation of grapes in ancient Israel and the popularity of wine-drinking. The production capacity apparent from archaeological remains and the frequent biblical references to wine suggest that it was the principal alcoholic beverage of the ancient Israelites. Based on the remains of wine production facilities and storage rooms, it has been estimated that on average, people could have consumed one liter of wine per person per day.

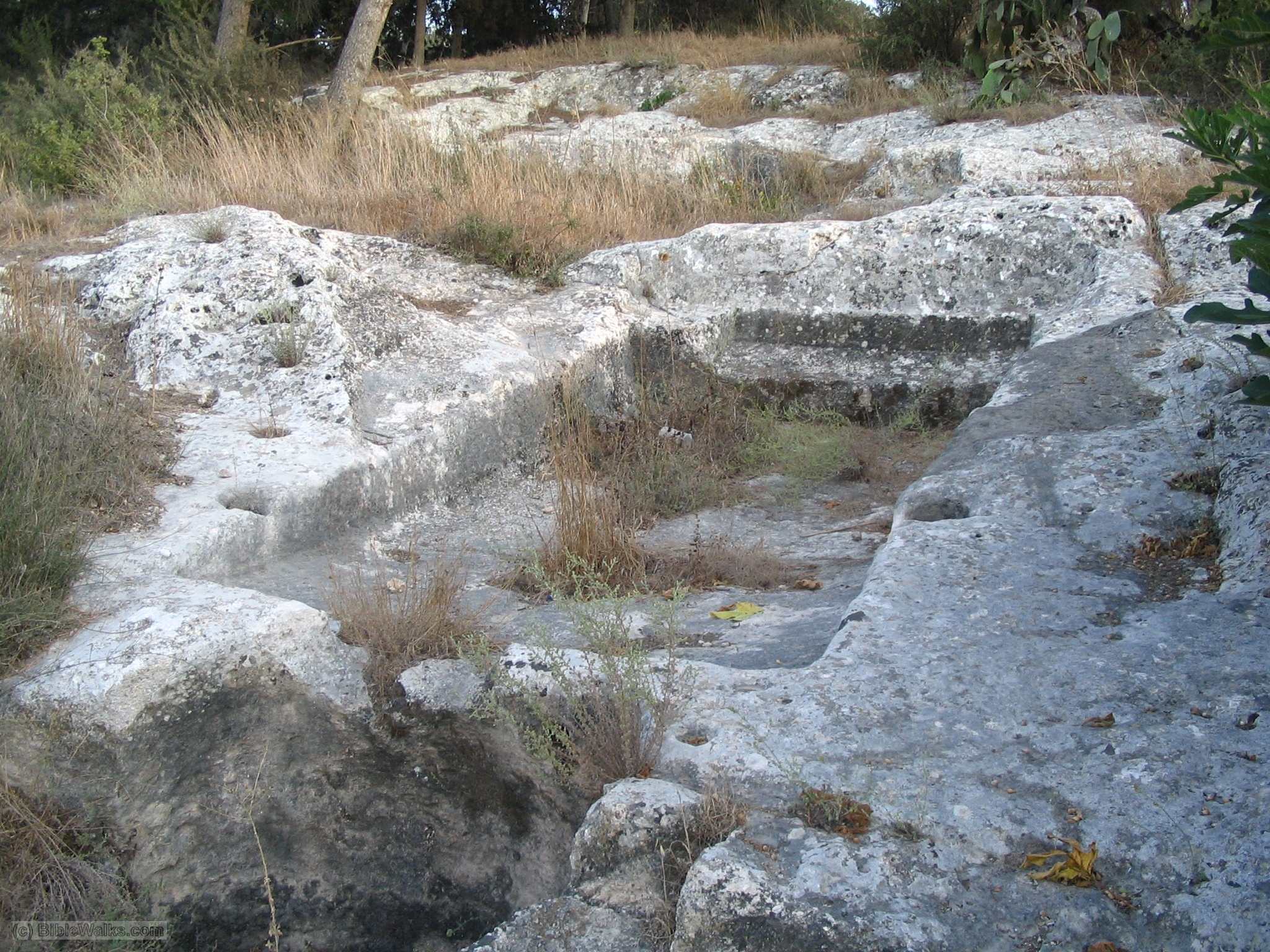
Ancient Israelite wine press at Migdal HaEmek

Many rock-hewn winepresses and vats, dating to the biblical period, have been found. One typical example at Gibeon has a wide surface for treading the grapes and a series of collecting vats. Archaeological finds at Ashkelon and Gibeon indicate large-scale wine production in the 8th and 7th centuries BC, which most likely developed to supply the Assyrian empire, and then the Babylonians, as well as the local population. Vineyards are mentioned many times in the Bible, including in detailed descriptions of the method for establishing a vineyard (Isaiah 5:1–2) and the types of vines (Ezekiel 17:6–8). The Bible refers to several types of wine, and one of the Arad ostraca also mentions wine among the supplies being sent to a garrison of soldiers.

Another indication of the importance of wine in ancient Israel is that Hebrew contains numerous terms for various stages and types of vines, grape varieties, and words for wine. The word yayin was used both as a generic word for wine and as a term for wine in its first year, once it had undergone sufficient fermentation from the initial stage, when it was called tirosh. The type of wine was determined by the grapes, the time allowed for fermentation, and the age of the wine.

The often coarse and unrefined taste of ancient wine was adjusted to make it more drinkable. Spices were added directly to the wine to improve the aroma, and other ingredients, such as honey, pepper, herbs, and even lime, resin, or seawater were added to improve the flavor or disguise a poor-tasting wine. Wine was also sweetened by the addition of grape juice syrup. Wine was also sometimes given an aroma by rubbing the winepress with wood resin. Wine could also be added to drinking water to improve the taste, especially towards the end of the summer when rainwater had been standing in a cistern for at least six months. This also had the beneficial effect of lowering the bacterial content of the water.

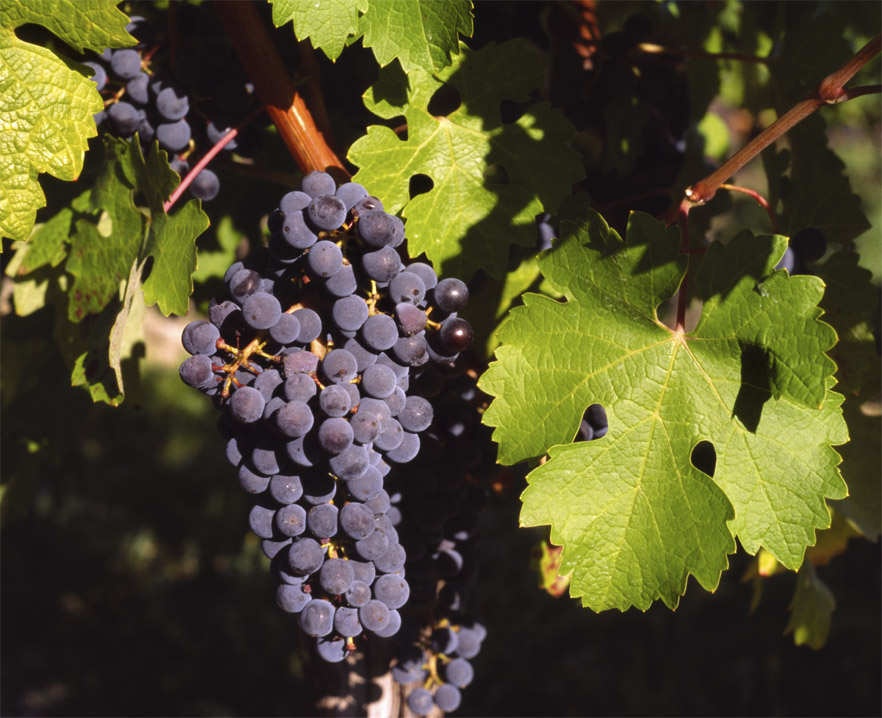
Grapes were important for the production of wine in ancient Israel

After the grape harvest in mid-summer, most grapes were taken to wine presses to extract their juice for winemaking. Once fermented, wine was transferred to wineskins or large amphorae for storage. Israelite amphorae were typically tall with large handles and little decoration, and the handles were often inscribed with the name of the city in which the wine had been produced, the winemaker’s stamp, and sometimes the year and the vintage. Amphorae made long-term storage possible, especially in caves or cool cellars. Glass bottles were introduced only in the 1st century AD by the Romans.

The insides of amphorae were often coated with a preservative resin, such as from the terebinth, and this imparted a pine flavor and aroma to the wine. Before the jars were sealed with pitch, they were filled completely and often topped with a thin layer of olive oil to prevent spoilage due to exposure to air.

During the Greek period, the style of winemaking changed. Ripe grapes were first dried to concentrate the sugars, and these then produced a much sweeter and higher alcohol content wine that needed to be diluted with water to be drinkable. Before this, watered-down wine was disparaged, but by the time of the Talmud, wine that did not require dilution with water was considered unfit for consumption.

==== Beer ====
Beer, produced by brewing barley, was another alcoholic beverage common in the ancient Near East. Beer was the primary beverage of ancient Egypt and Mesopotamia and it can be assumed that in Israel, which is located between the two, beer was also known. The biblical term sekhar may refer to beer or to alcoholic drinks in general.

The production of bread and beer were closely linked, since barley was the same key ingredient used for both, and most of the tools used in beer production, such as mortars, querns and winnowing baskets were also the same as for bread making. Archaeological evidence specific to beer making is thus uncommon, and earlier indications were that the ancient Israelites did not often drink beer. More recently, Iron-Age sites in Israel have produced remains such as beer jugs, bottles, strainers and stoppers, all of which provide evidence that the Israelites drank beer. Nonetheless, the widespread cultivation of grapes, used primarily for winemaking, indicates that wine drinking was probably far more common than beer drinking.

== Cooking, storage, and preservation ==
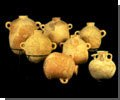
Storage jars from Iron-Age Megiddo

Storing water and food was critical for survival, and particularly, being able to store enough food for use from one harvest to the next. To protect grain from damp conditions and vermin, underground granaries were used for the bulk storage of grain. Families also stored grain, wine and oil in large pottery jars in their houses. When well protected, wheat, barley, legumes and nuts could be kept for long periods. Rainwater from roofs and courtyards was collected in cisterns to supplement natural sources like springs and wells.

Fermentation, oil extraction and drying were all ways of converting food into products that could be stored. Feeding crops to animals was also a means of "storage on the hoof" with the animals converting the fodder into meat or milk.

Food was cooked in pots made of clay and placed on earthenware stands built in a horseshoe shape, so that the fire could be lit through the opening, under the pot, or pots were suspended above the fire from tripods.

Cooked food included soups and stews that were a mixture of meat and vegetables. Beans and lentils were likely to have been cooked several times a week. However, vegetables, such as melons, garlic, leek and onions were also eaten uncooked.

== Culinary customs ==
Meals eaten by the Israelites fell into two categories: daily meals, and festive or ritual meals.

=== Daily meals ===
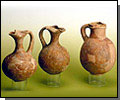
Pottery serving jugs from Iron-Age Megiddo

Daily meals were prepared by women. Two daily meals were usually eaten by the family, either in the home or in the field. The first meal was eaten in the late morning, as a break in the workday, and could include roasted grain, olives, figs or some other fruit, bread dipped in olive oil or vinegar, or bread eaten with garlic, onions, or black radishes for flavor, and water or wine. A description in the Book of Ruth provides an example of this kind of meal: the harvest workers eat bread dipped in vinegar and parched or roasted grain (Ruth 2:14). Agricultural workers, who comprised the largest part of the population, also ate a light meal in the early morning before leaving for their work in the fields (Proverbs 31:15).

The second meal was the main meal of the day and was eaten in the evening. In addition to bread, it typically included soup or a stew of vegetables or legumes, served in a common pot into which everyone dipped their bread. Also served from time to time were cheese and fruits such as fresh figs and melon when in season, as well as dried fruits. Water, wine, and milk could also accompany the meal.

Small bowls were used for both eating and drinking. Small jugs contained condiments like olive oil, vinegar, and sweeteners. Wide-mouthed pitchers held water and milk, while spouted decanters with narrow, ridged necks with built-in strainers held wine.

=== Festive meals and feasts ===
Festive meals were held to mark significant occasions, entertain important guests, or as sacrificial or ritual meals. The meal was prepared by both men and women. Meat was always served at these meals and many people participated so that there would be no leftovers that would go to waste.

Ritual feasts and banquets in ancient Israel, and the ancient Near East in general, were important for building social relationships and demonstrating status, transacting business and concluding agreements, enlisting divine help, or showing thanks, devotion or propitiation to a deity, and for conveying social instruction. These meals were imbued with significance by the occasion and were a time for entertainment and enjoyment.

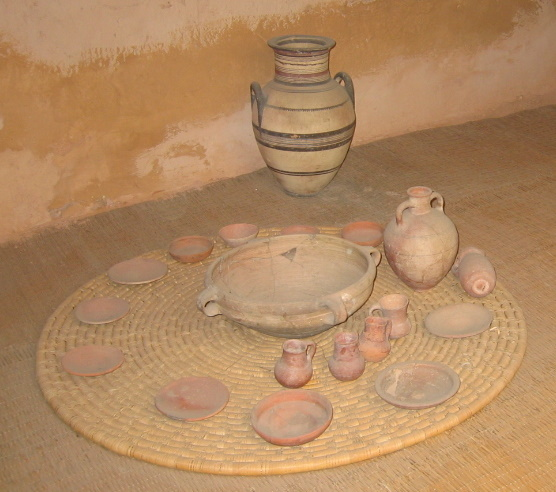
Food dishes, bowls and serving jugs shown in a reconstructed Israelite house

Festive meals were held only from time to time, but they are the ones recorded by biblical and extra-biblical sources. Many biblical stories are set within the context of a meal, such as the accounts of the food Abraham prepares for his visitors (Genesis 18:1–8), the stew which Jacob prepares for his father, Isaac, and the Passover meal (Exodus 12).

In the story of Abraham hosting the three visitors, Abraham offers cakes, a well prepared young calf, curds, and milk. This meal has similar elements to an earlier meal described in the story of Sinuhe, an Egyptian nobleman who lived for a time in Canaan around 1900 BCE, at which bread, wine, cooked meat, roast fowl, and dairy products were served.

One of the distinguishing features of the meals of the wealthier social class, as illustrated in the stories of Abraham and Sinuhe, was the more frequent consumption of meat. A description of the provisions for Solomon's kitchen also illustrates this: "Solomon's daily provisions consisted of 30 kor of fine flour and 60 kor of flour, 10 fat oxen, 20 pasture-fed oxen, and 100 sheep and goats, in addition to deer and gazelles, roebucks and fattened geese" (1 Kings 5:2–3). This account describes the provisions that were possible to obtain for those with the resources to purchase them and indicates they were sufficient to provide sumptuous meals for thousands of people.

Another example of a lavish meal celebrating an important occasion is the inauguration of the Temple by Solomon (1 Kings 8:65, 2 Chronicles 7:8). Similar meals are described regarding Hezekiah's temple consecration (2 Chronicles 29:31–35) and Passover celebration (2 Chronicles 30:23–24).

In contrast to the simplicity of the daily fare of ordinary people, the cuisine of the royal courts of the ancient Near East was sophisticated, and it is assumed that the dishes served at the table of King Solomon and other Israelite kings were also elaborate. King David had officials who were in charge of wine cellars, olive stores, cattle, olive and fig trees (1 Chronicles 27:27–31) and the royal kitchen was a complex organization.

The kings of Israel are recorded as having displayed an extraordinary measure of royal hospitality, like other kings of the ancient Near East who held elaborate banquets. Solomon’s royal table is described as providing such a variety of foods that the Queen of Sheba is said to have been amazed that the reports of Solomon’s wealth did not exceed what she had seen (1 Kings 10:4–7). Royal entertainment in Israel included music (Ecclesiastes 2:8), large numbers of guests (1 Kings 18:19), and presumably many servers and cupbearers, though these are not expressly mentioned in the Bible.

Feasts and banquets were important social and political tools throughout Israel’s history, especially in the early years of the Israelite monarchy, when an invitation to the king’s table was important for creating and maintaining political support and was also an important marker of social status and influence.

Regular meals too, developed as expressions of common identity, social unity and communal celebration. By the Roman period, Jewish communities came together at banquets for both food and company and the weekly Sabbath meal was an occasion for families to gather and enjoy both food and company.

=== Hospitality ===
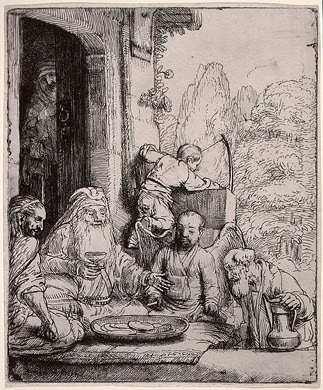
Depiction of Abraham hosting his guests

The practice of hospitality was a fundamental custom of Israelite society and serving food was integral to the hosting of guests. Additionally, in ancient Israel, the belief that God had delivered Israel from slavery resulted in the social imperative and religious commandment to look after guests and strangers as an act of recognition and gratitude.

The importance of hospitality to the Israelites can be inferred from the texts of the Bible, in numerous instances, including the stories of Abraham hosting the messengers, Gideon's call to leadership (Judges 6:19), the hospitality of the woman from Zarephath towards the Prophet Elijah (1 Kings 17:8–16) and the Shunammite woman towards Elisha (2 Kings 4:8–11), David’s hosting of Mephiboshet, son of Jonathan (2 Samuel 9:6–7) and Hezekiah’s invitation to the people of the northern kingdom of Israel to celebrate the Passover in Jerusalem (2 Chronicles 30).

Meals at which important guests were present were viewed as special occasions, and as such, meat was served. The order in which the guests were served indicated the recognition of the social status of the guest. The choice of meat and dishes indicated the importance of the occasion. The Bible illustrates this in relating how Samuel hosted Saul, who, seated at the head of the hall is served first with a portion of meat that has been especially reserved for him (1 Samuel 9:22–24).

Certain parts of the animal, such as the breast and the right thigh, were considered to be the best portions and were reserved for the most honored participants in the meal. Guests were always served before family members. The host would also sit with the guests to encourage them to eat and see to all their needs, as related in the story of Abraham, who waited on his visitors while they ate.

=== Religious sacrificial meals ===
Sacrificial meals were eaten when a portion of a sacrifice was reserved for the priest (kohen) or the ordinary Israelite who brought the offering was permitted to eat a portion with his family at a festive meal. The offerings considered "most holy" were eaten by the males of the priests in the court of the Temple sanctuary (Leviticus 7:9–10). The meal was considered to be a part of the priest’s duties. Other offerings could be eaten by the priests with their families in any ritually clean place (Leviticus 10:14). The ordinary Israelite had to eat his share within a fixed time, with his family, guests, and any Levites and strangers that he invited.

Depending on the type of sacrifice, the animals that were brought as sacrifices could be a lamb, kid, goat, ram, calf, bull or cow; bird offerings were doves and turtledoves (pigeons). Of these, the guilt offering (asham) (Leviticus 5) and the communal peace offering (shalmei tzibur) (Leviticus 23:19–29) were eaten only by the male priests (kohanim). Other offerings, such as the Firstborn offering (Numbers 18:17–18), could be eaten by the priests and other members of their households, while for the personal peace offering (shalmei yachid) (Leviticus 3) and Thanksgiving offering (Leviticus 7:31–34), the breast and thigh meat were eaten by the priests and other members of their households and the remainder by ordinary Israelites. The Tithe offering (Leviticus 27:32) could be eaten by anyone and the Passover offering (Exodus 12) was eaten by all who had purchased a share in the sacrifice.

Meal offerings called mincha all consisted primarily of flour and were either completely or partially burned on the altar. Those not entirely burned on the altar were eaten by the priests. Some mincha offerings were fried or baked before being offered. Types of mincha included fine flour (solet) mixed with oil and of which a portion was given to the kohen; flour mixed with oil and fried on a griddle or on a pan; bread called challot mixed with oil and baked in an oven; and wafers (rekikim) smeared with oil baked in an oven.

There were also baked goods, all made of wheat flour and baked in an oven, which were not burned on the altar. These were the twelve unleavened and specially shaped showbreads, eaten by the priests after they had been displayed; two loaves of leavened bread prepared for the festival of Shavuot and eaten by the priests; thanksgiving breads, which included leavened bread, unleavened bread, unleavened wafers and scalded loaves, with one of each kind given to the priests and the remainder eaten by the owner and guests; and the unleavened loaves and wafers accompanying the Nazirite's sacrificial ram, one of each kind given to the priests and the remainder eaten by the Nazirite and guests.

Whole extended families or clans also participated in a sacrifice that was offered on occasions such as the New Moon, and it is referred to as both the "sacrifice of days" and a kinship sacrifice. In the early Israelite period, before the centralization of sacrificial offerings as an exclusive part of the Temple services, these sacrifices were offered at various locations. David is described as leaving Saul’s table to participate with his family in Bethlehem (1 Samuel 20:6) and Elkanah goes to Shiloh to participate with his household in the annual sacrifice (1 Samuel 1:21).

Perhaps the oldest and most important feast celebrated by the Jews is the Passover. The original feast, with its origins in the story of the Exodus, consisted of a sacrificial lamb, bitter herbs and unleavened bread eaten by each family at home. Under the Israelite monarchy, and with the establishment of the Temple in Jerusalem, the sacrifice and celebration of Passover became centralized as one of the three pilgrimage festivals. Families who were able to travel to Jerusalem ate the Passover meal together in Jerusalem. Those who could not make the pilgrimage celebrated the holiday by holding a special meal and observing the Feast of Unleavened Bread.

== Prohibitions ==
There are no biblical lists containing forbidden plants, so it can be assumed that any plant or fruit was permissible as food, with their use limited only by taste or toxicity (for example, 2 Kings 4:39–40) and the fulfillment of religious requirements such as the tithes.

=== Mixing meat and dairy ===
In addition to requiring that certain foods be eaten for sacred purposes, the Israelite diet was shaped by religious practices which prohibited the consumption of certain foods, both in terms of the animals permissible for eating, and the manner of their preparation. The cuisine of the Israelites thus differed from that of their neighbors in significant ways. For example, ancient Mesopotamian recipes describe foods cooked with animal blood and milk added to meat stews; this would have been avoided by the ancient Israelites.

=== Consuming from certain animals ===
Only animals specifically slaughtered for food or for use in the sacrificial service could be eaten. Detailed lists of which animals, birds, and fish could be eaten and which were prohibited appear in the Bible (Leviticus 11 and Deuteronomy 14:3–21), and animal bones found in the archaeological record tend to support this, with some exceptions. For the Israelites, food was one way for self-definition. While it is impossible to know to what extent dietary laws were observed, self-definition is most likely the basis for certain biblical lists of different kinds of animals permitted or forbidden for consumption. The taboo against eating certain animals, particularly the pig, may have developed from the early Iron Age.

Archaeological evidence from various sites shows that the consumption of pork, while limited, was higher in the early Iron Age but had mostly disappeared during the later Iron Age. Sites in the highlands and the coastal plains show low levels of pig utilization in the early Iron Age, but on the coastal plain, excavations such as Ekron show a higher consumption of pig; this is usually associated with the arrival of the Philistines. However, even at Philistine sites, pig remains were a small proportion of the bones discovered, and these decline after the initial period of settlement. This may have been due to unsuitable environmental factors for raising pigs.

At archaeological excavations at Mount Ebal in Samaria, from the period immediately after the Israelite conquest, animal bones discovered were only from animals considered permissible, such as cattle, sheep, goats, and deer.

==== Forbidden preparation methods ====
In addition, some taboos did not relate to the source of the food but to the way in which they were prepared, as in the prohibition against boiling a young goat in its mother’s milk (and mentioned in the Bible in three separate instances: Exodus 23:19, Exodus 34:26, Deuteronomy 14:21). Milk and its by-products served as offerings in Near-Eastern pagan worship to gods and kings. Milk was used in connection with the phenomenon of reproduction, and a goat kid would be cooked in its mother's milk. Thus, the Israelite practice was to avoid an act similar to that carried out by the Canaanites as part of their cult worship (Ezra 9:1).

=== Consuming blood ===
The Israelites believed that since an animal’s blood represented its life, its blood should not be consumed (Deuteronomy 12:23–24). The blood of a slaughtered animal was thus drained before the meat was used and the blood itself was not used as a cooking liquid or drink.

== See also ==
- Biblical archaeology
- Jewish cuisine
  - Israeli cuisine
- List of ancient dishes
- What Did the Ancient Israelites Eat?
