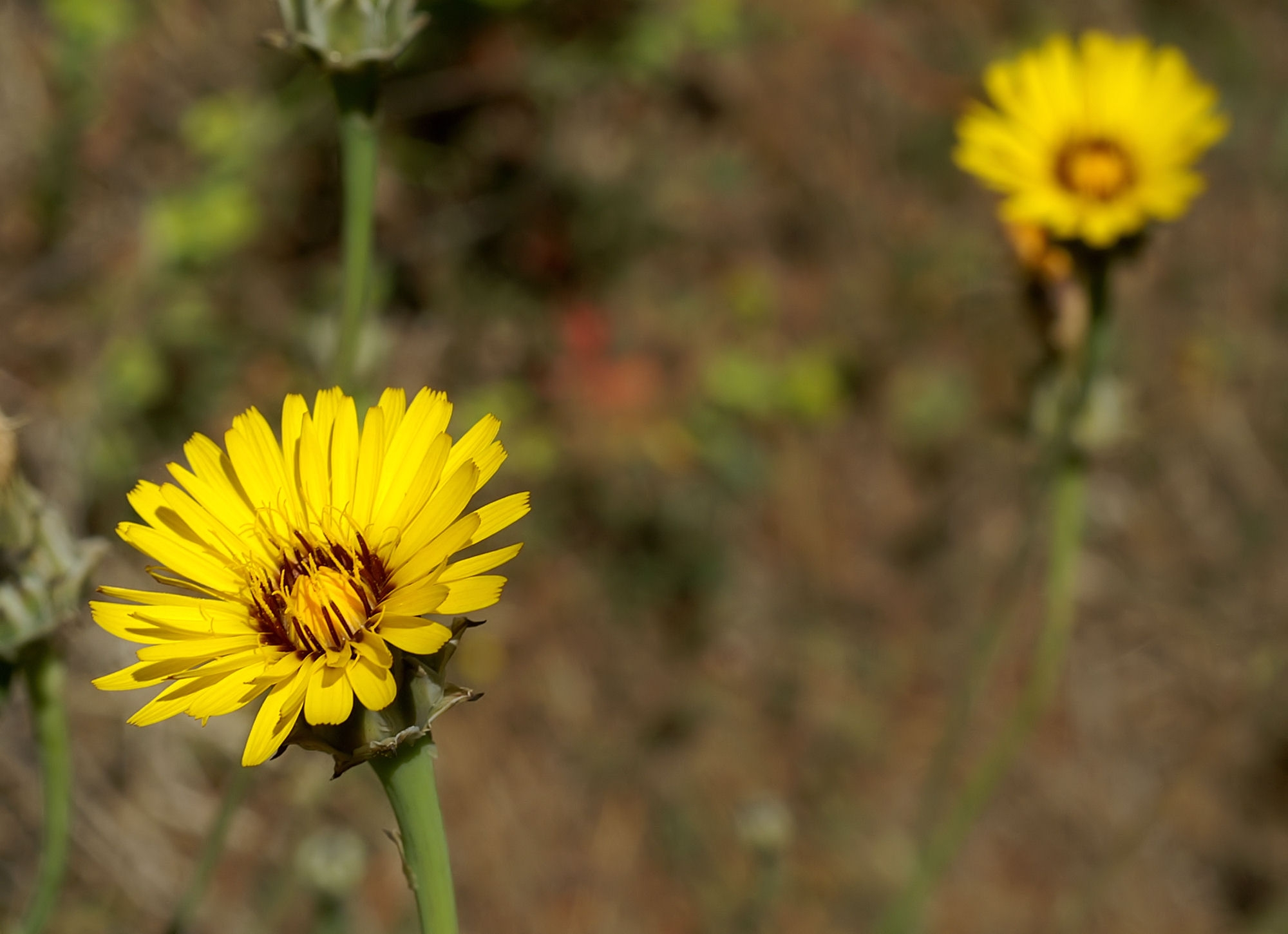
- In Spain

Scientific classification
- Kingdom: Plantae
- Clade: Embryophytes
- Clade: Tracheophytes
- Clade: Spermatophytes
- Clade: Angiosperms
- Clade: Eudicots
- Clade: Asterids
- Order: Asterales
- Family: Asteraceae
- Genus: Reichardia
- Species: R. tingitana

Binomial name
- Reichardia tingitana (L.) Roth (1787)

Synonyms
- Reichardia orientalis (L.) Asch. & Schweinf.

= Reichardia tingitana =

Species of plant

Reichardia tingitana is a species of plant in the family Asteraceae that is distributed primarily throughout Mediterranean and West Asia. It is known by the common name false sowthistle.

== Description ==
The leaves have an alternate arrangement and are entire with serrated margins. No stipule is present on the petiole.

An annual plant, its flowering period is from March to May. Like most angiosperms, its flowers are hermaphroditic. The petals are of a yellow color.

== Main habitat ==
As a glycophyte, it is accustomed to growing in saline soils. Arid deserts and shrub-steppes are its most common habitats. It also grows well in sandy depressions in the Middle East.

In France, it is a naturalized species. Another country it has been introduced to is Australia, where it is commonly recognized as a minor weed. There its main habitats are urban sites, coastal dunes and alluvial plains.

It has been recorded in Bahrain, Kuwait, Qatar, the United Arab Emirates and eastern Saudi Arabia. Common names for it in Arabia are huzan, mureer, and murar. Uses in folk medicine have been recorded in the Middle East, its leaves being used to treat ailments such as constipation, colic and inflamed eyes.

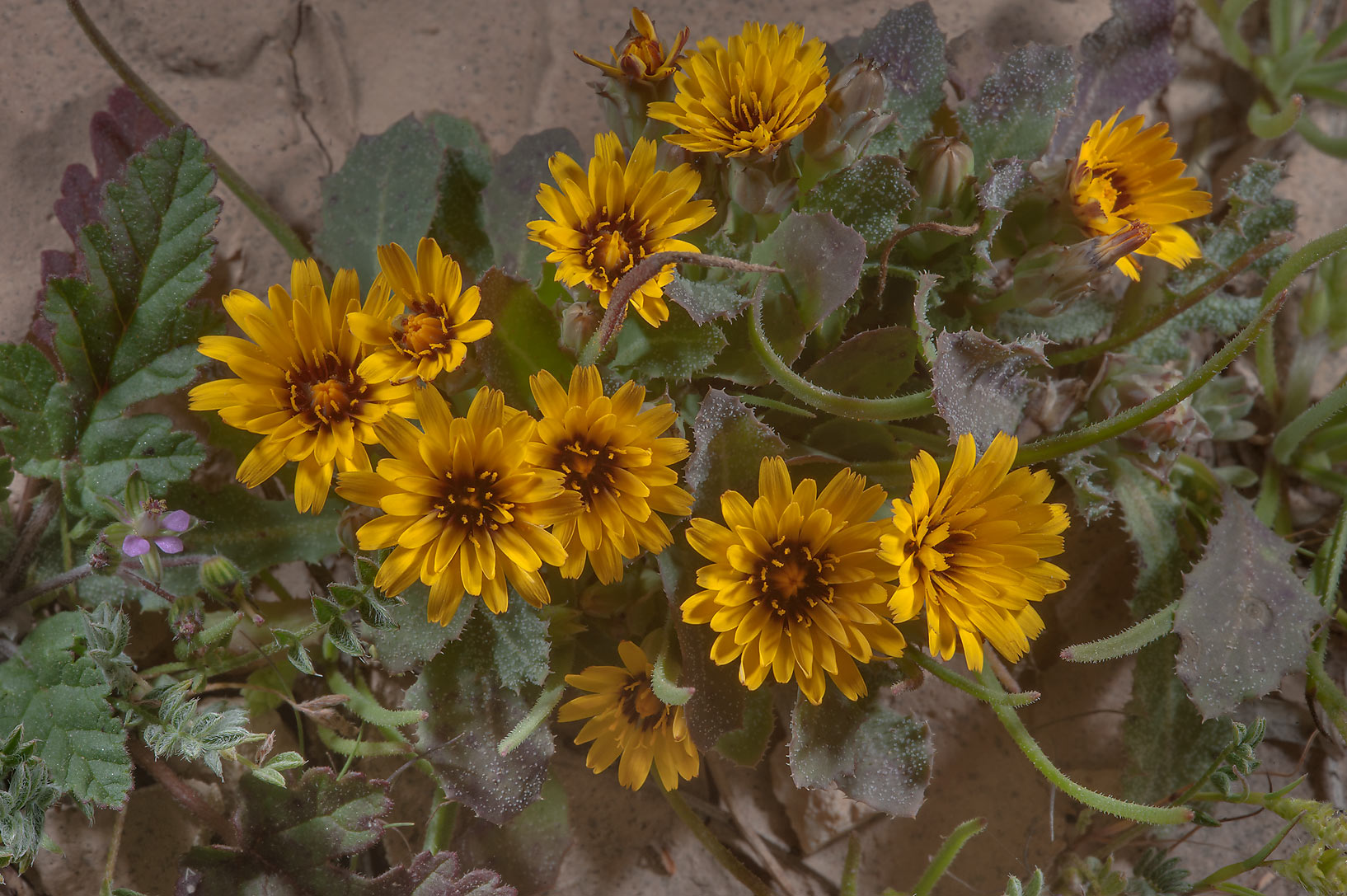
Cluster of R. tingitana flowers in Qatar

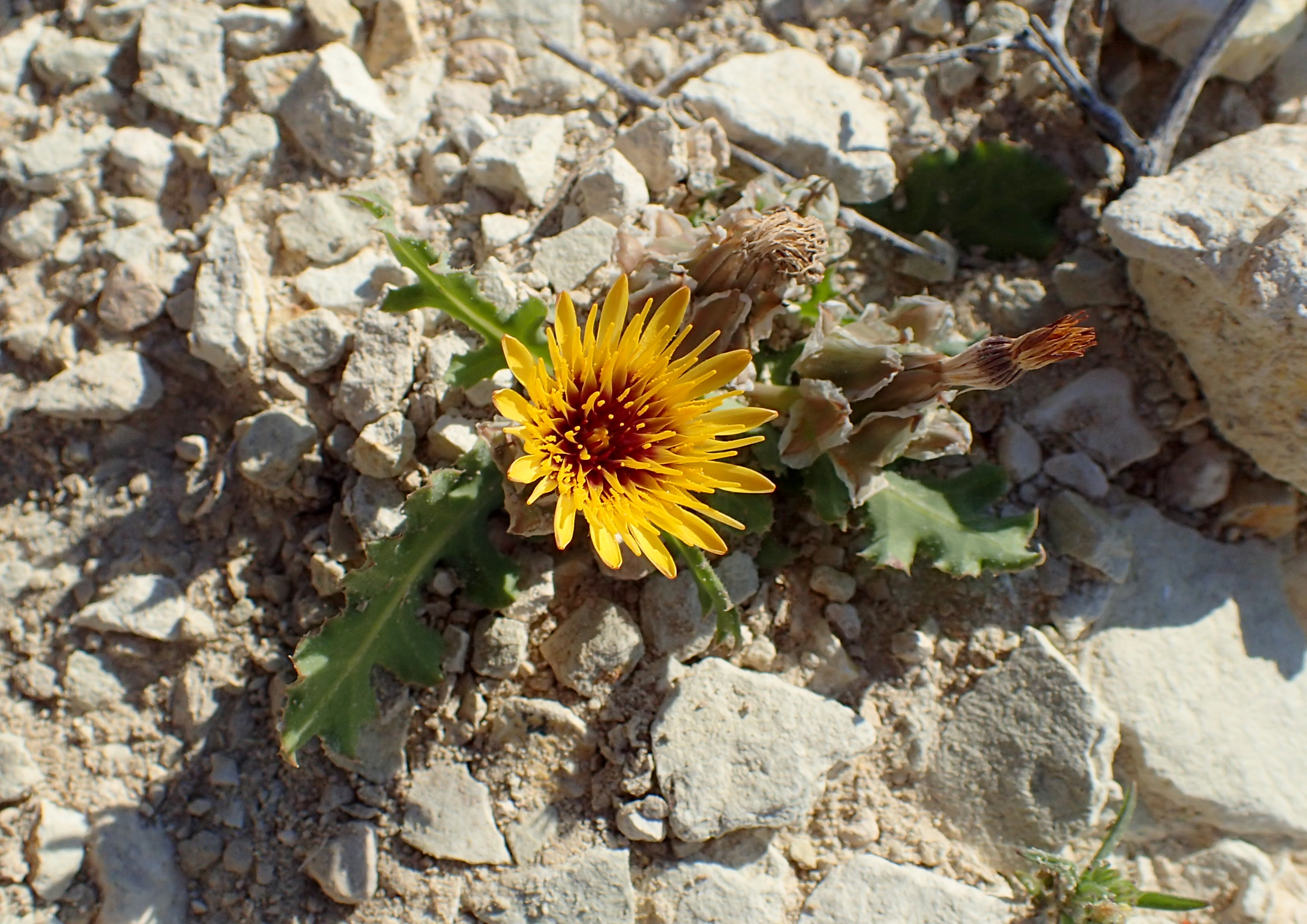
Lone flower of R. tingitana in Cyprus

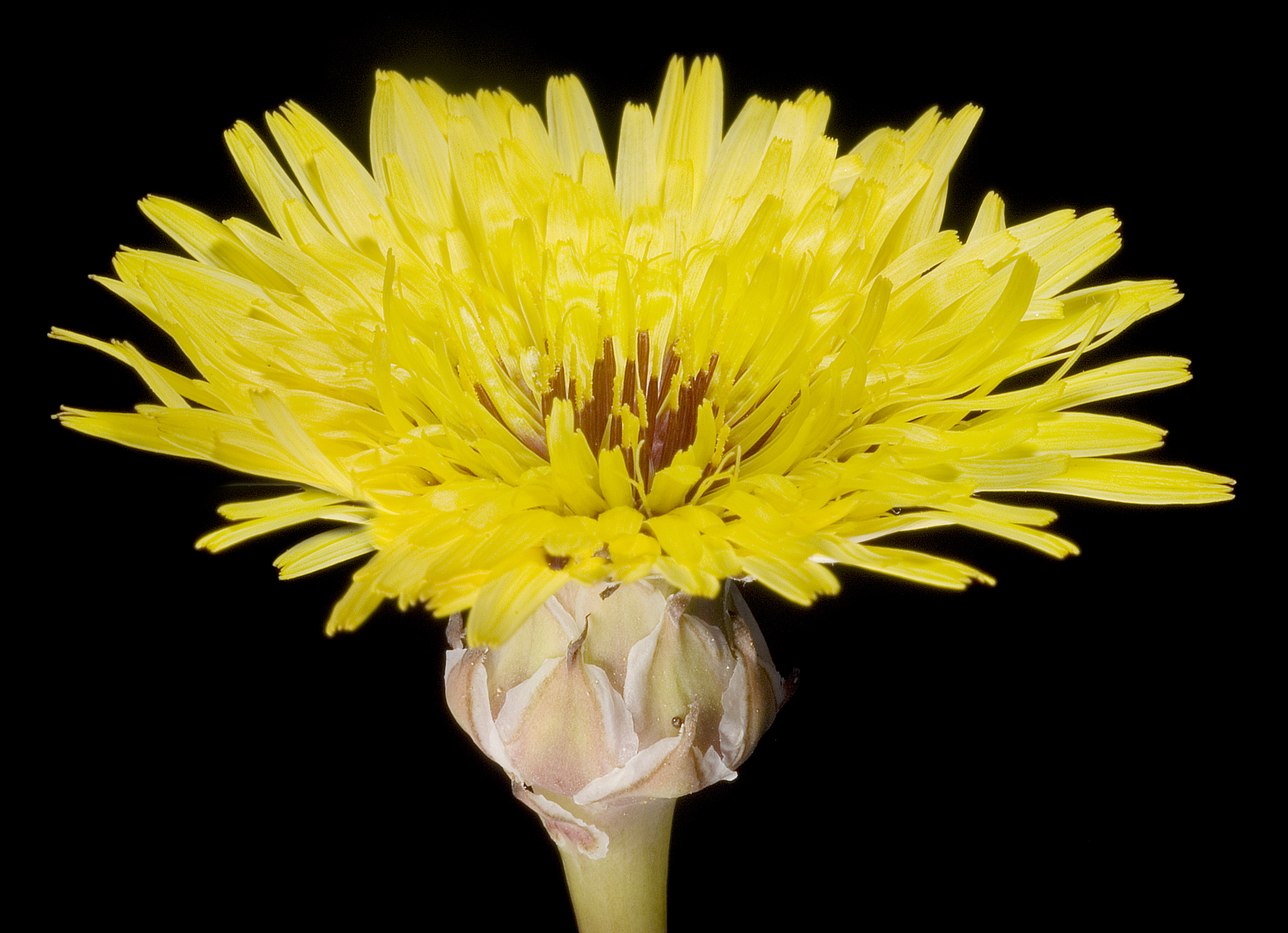
Close-up (Western Australia)
