= Ashishim =

Red lentil pancake dish of Ancient Israelite origin

Ashishim or ashishot (Biblical Hebrew: אֲשִׁישׁוֹת, romanized: ʾăšīšōṯ) is a Red lentil pancake dish of Ancient Israelite origin. According to the Talmud, it was a common dish eaten by Jews in antiquity.

Raisin cakes called "ashishot" are mentioned in several ancient Jewish texts, including the Books of Chronicles, the Song of Songs, and the Book of Hosea. However, in the Jerusalem Talmud, a fried pancake made of ground roasted lentils and honey is identified as ashishim by Yasa of Tiberias.

== See also ==
- Bimuelos – a similar Sephardic Jewish dish
