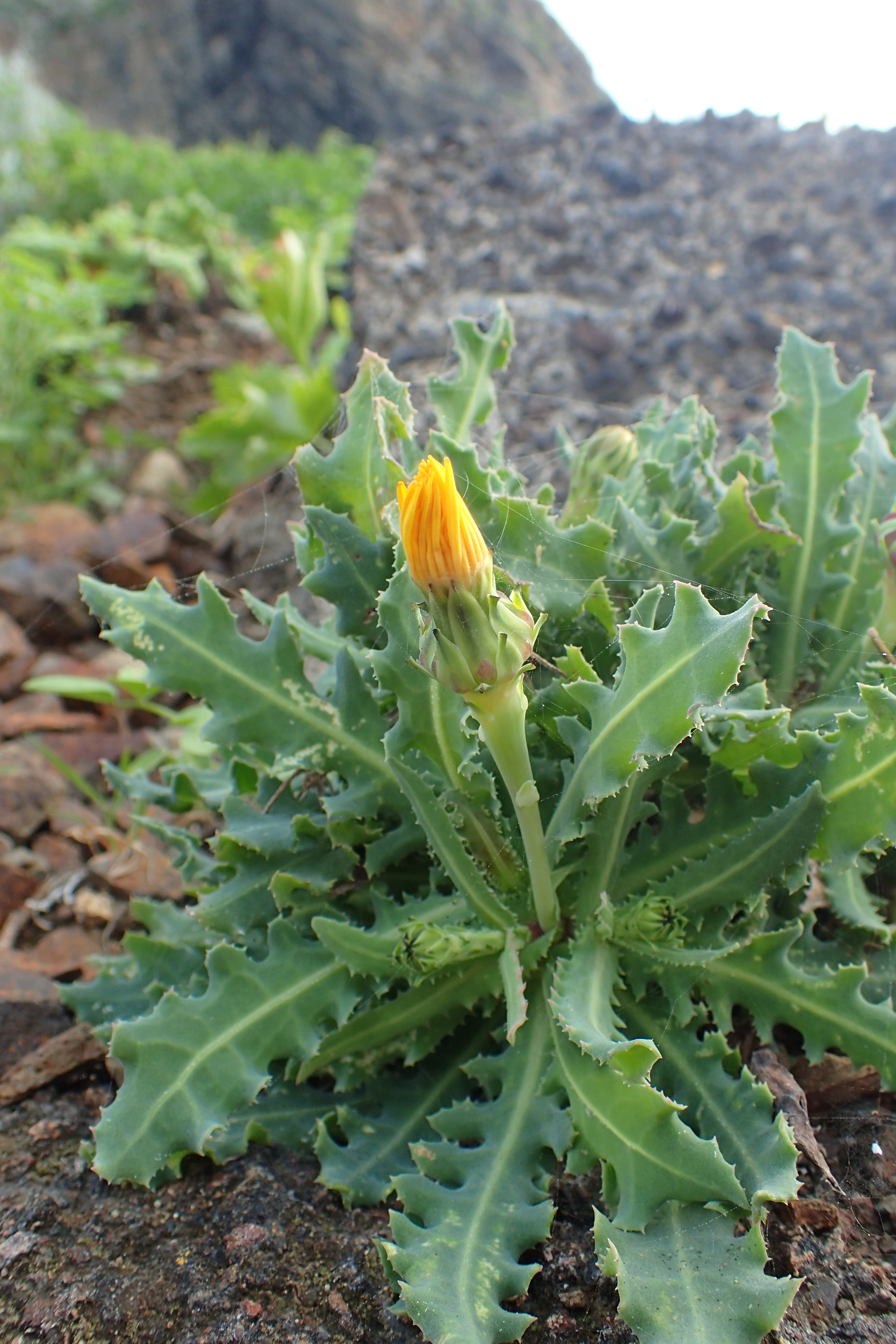
- Reichardia ligulata in Roque de los Animas, Tenerife

Scientific classification
- Kingdom: Plantae
- Clade: Tracheophytes
- Clade: Angiosperms
- Clade: Eudicots
- Clade: Asterids
- Order: Asterales
- Family: Asteraceae
- Genus: Reichardia
- Species: R. ligulata

Binomial name
- Reichardia ligulata (Vent.) G.Kunkel & Sunding

= Reichardia ligulata =

Species of plant

Reichardia ligulata is a species of plant in the tribe Cichorieae within the family Asteraceae native to the Canary Islands (Tenerife, Grand Canaria, and La Palma) where it grows on rocky coastal slopes and cliffs.
