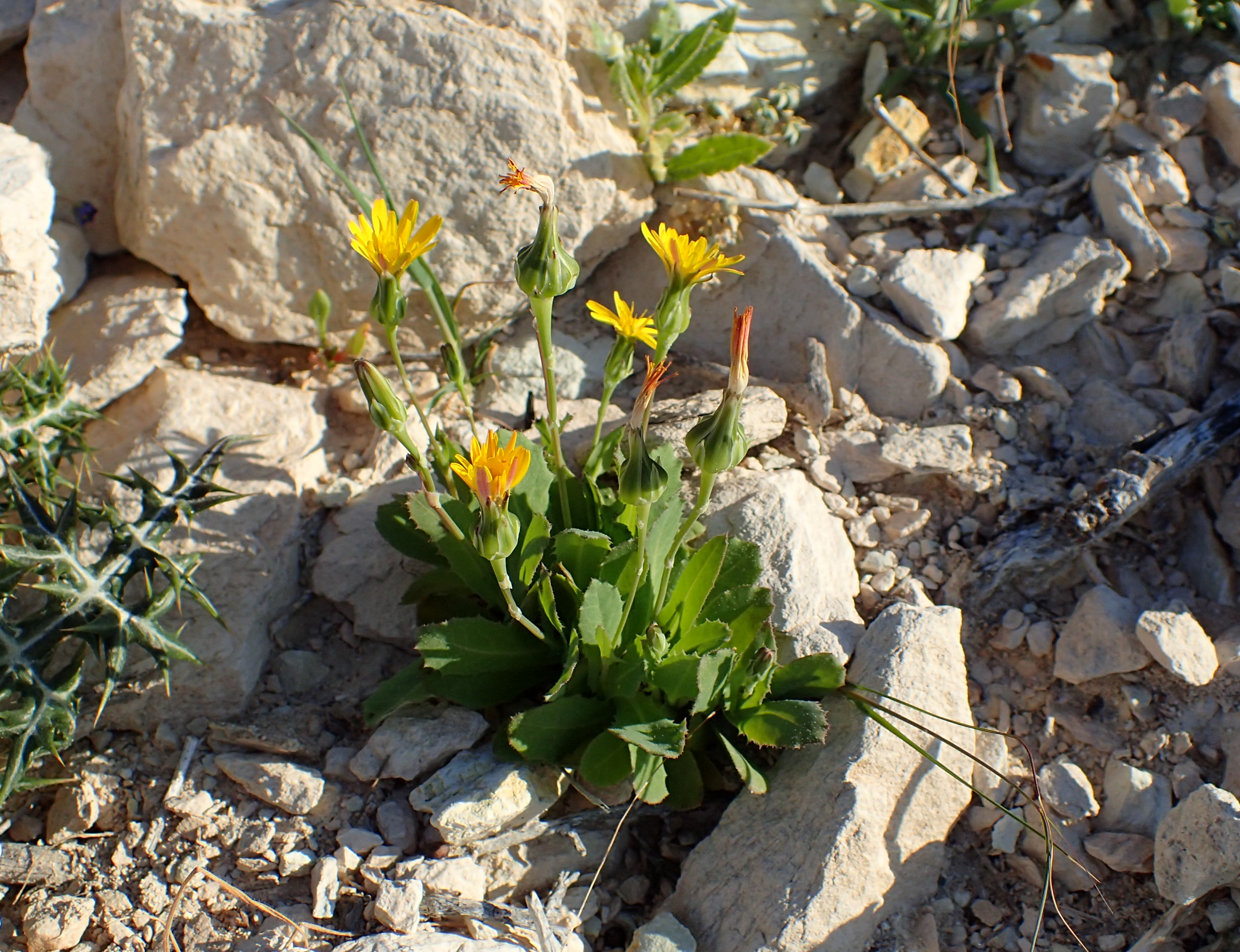

Scientific classification
- Kingdom: Plantae
- Clade: Tracheophytes
- Clade: Angiosperms
- Clade: Eudicots
- Clade: Asterids
- Order: Asterales
- Family: Asteraceae
- Genus: Reichardia
- Species: R. intermedia

Binomial name
- Reichardia intermedia (Jan ex DC.) Coutinho

Synonyms
- Picridium intermedium

= Reichardia intermedia =

Species of plant

Reichardia intermedia is a species of plant in the family Asteraceae.

== Sources ==
This article incorporates text from a free content work. Licensed under CC0 (license statement/permission). Text taken from Reichardia intermedia. Encyclopedia of Life.
