= What Did the Ancient Israelites Eat? =

2008 book by Nathan MacDonald

What Did the Ancient Israelites Eat? Diet in Biblical Times
- Author: Nathan MacDonald
- Publisher: William B. Eerdmans
- Publication date: 2008
- Pages: 156
- ISBN: 978-0-8028-6298-3
- OCLC: 214934609

What Did the Ancient Israelites Eat? Diet in Biblical Times is a 2008 book by Nathan MacDonald that discusses the foods eaten by Israelites during the time that the Bible was written. MacDonald, a theologian who serves as a lecturer at St Andrews University, used biblical texts as well as archaeological and anthropological evidence in his attempts to determine the diet of the Israelites. MacDonald decided to write the book while writing another book on the symbolism of food in the Hebrew Bible that contained a chapter on the diet of the Israelites.

Nathan MacDonald argues that the diet of the Israelites was very high in bread and grains and often contained little meat or vegetables, leading many to become deficient in vitamins and minerals. He also notes that they endured frequent famines. He criticizes the Bible Diet and maintains that the bible is best used to provide religious and moral, rather than nutritional, instruction. He argues that while people who attempt to determine an ideal diet based on the bible may offer sound nutritional advice, they frequently use flawed hermeneutics to arrive at their conclusions.
