= Shemen (bible) =

Biblical term for oil

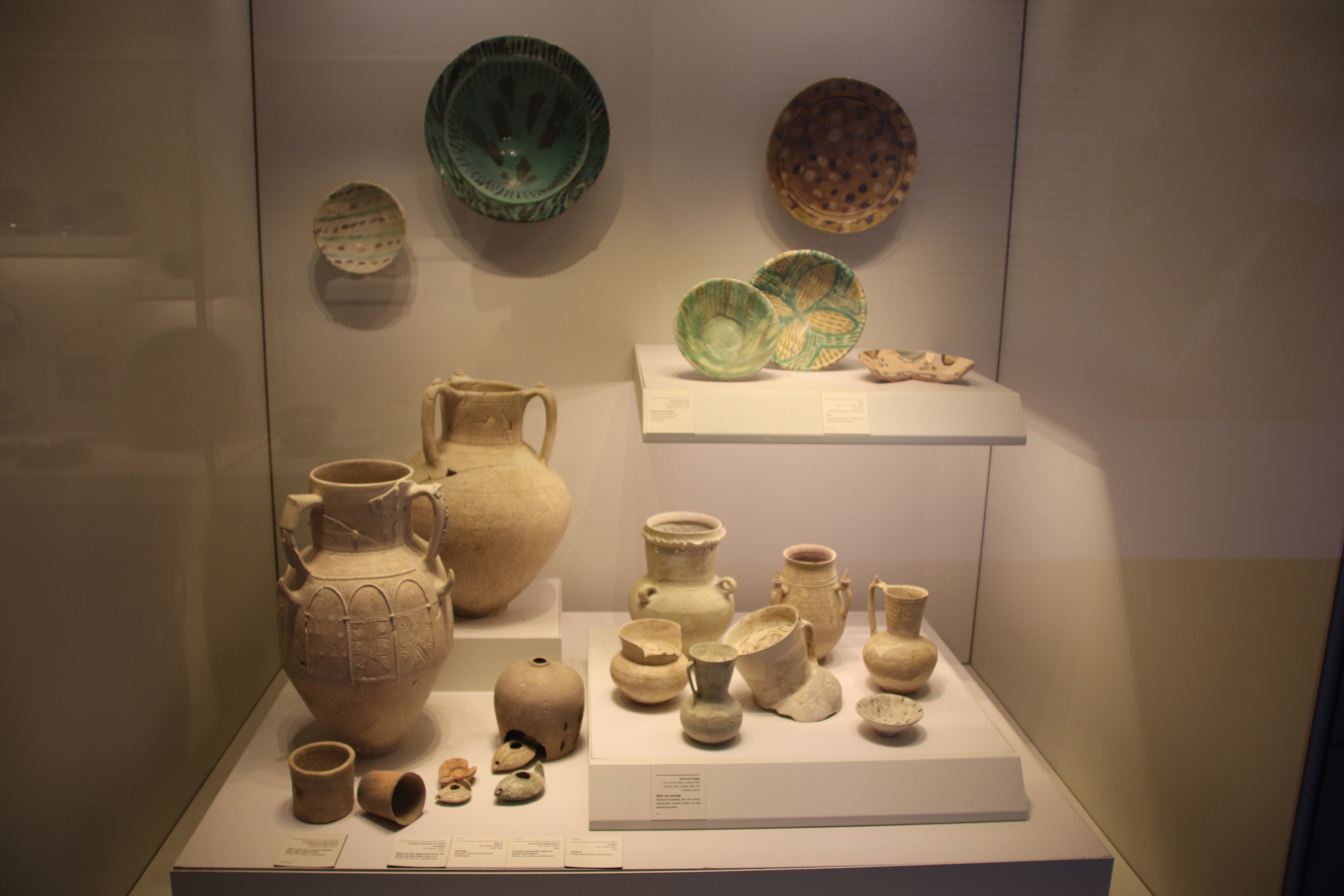
Bowls, jars and oil lamps from the Biblical period (Israel Museum)

Shemen (Hebrew: שמן, romanized: šemen) is the most commonly used word for oil in the Hebrew scriptures, used around 170 times in a variety of contexts.

== Cooking oil ==
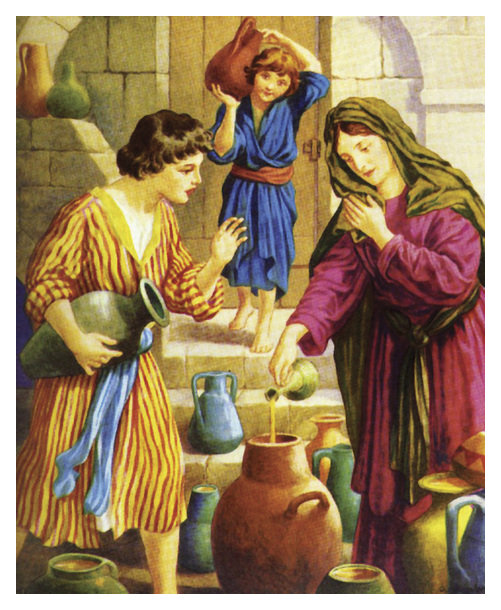
In 2 Kings 4, Elisha performs a miracle by multiplying a widow's oil.

In Exodus 29:1–9 describing the ordination of Aaron and his sons, unleavened challah (חלה) made with oil, translated as 'cakes', and wafers (רקיק) spread with oil are among the required offerings. The cakes, wafers and bread offering (לחם) made of the best quality of wheat are placed in a basket. After Aaron and his sons are anointed with oil and blood, the ram's tail fat, kidneys and other parts are burned as an offering, along with one oil cake, one wafer, and a piece of the unleavened bread. Then the remaining ram flesh is boiled for Aaron and his sons to eat along with the remainder of the bread and cakes.

In the Deuteronomy 8:8 it is mentioned as eretz zeit shemen in the description of the "good land": "A land of wheat and barley and the vine and figs and pomegranates, a land of olives for oil, and (date) honey". Based on this verse and additional descriptions given in Deuteronomy 6:11, Deuteronomy 28:40, Joshua 24:13 and 2 Kings 18:32, olive oil appears to have been plentiful. Excavations at Tel Miqne-Ekron revealed over a hundred oil presses, and the region seems to have been central to a major olive oil industry.

Genesis 49:20 describes the wealth of the lands of Asher: "From Asher shall come fat bread [rich foods], and he will provide delicacies of a king". The relationship between fat (Hebrew: שמנה, shemeneh) and oil (Hebrew: שהנ, shemen) has been discussed by Ibn Ezra. The blessings of Asher's exceptionally fertile lands is given by Moses in Deuteronomy 33:24: "May he dip his foot in oil".

Describing the hardships of the wilderness, in Numbers 11:8 the Israelites have only manna to eat, which they prepare into flat cakes called uggah (עוגה) that according to the passage tasted like lesad hassamen (לשד השמן). Translated as rich cream by the JPS, the certain meaning is not known. Aside from Psalms 32:4, this verse is the only known use of lesad. It was translated into Greek as cake with oil (εγκρις εξ ελαιου), enkris having also been used for the Hebrew tzappihhit in place of wafers in Exodus 16:31 (where the taste is described "like a cake made with honey").

== Ritual uses ==
In Exodus 29:21 two unblemished rams are brought before Aaron and his sons for their ordination as priests. One is sacrificed as a burnt offering, while the second is slaughtered and some of the blood mixed with anointing oil and sprinkled on the priestly vestments. It was also used to anoint kings.

It is used for anointing oil in conjunction with Bethel and other sites that were "anointed" in the narrative of Jacob's Ladder and subsequent second visit to Bethel (Genesis 35:9–15). It is one of the offerings God demands of the Israelites for the Tabernacle in Exodus 25:3–8 in the context of spices to be used to make anointing oil and incense, as well as for use in lamps. It is also used in the context of offerings in Micah 6:7: "Will the Lord be pleased with thousands of rams, With ten thousands of rivers of oil? Shall I give my first born for my transgression, The fruit of my body for the sin of my soul?"

Leviticus 24:1–9 discusses Israel's obligations to provide the daily oil for the lamps at the Tabernacle, and the weekly bread for the priests.

There are various additional rules on the use of oil for lighting in different contexts such as searching for chametz during Pesach. Sometimes the shamash candle is made of wax, while olive oil is used for the other candles.

== Trade ==
According to Ezekiel 27:17 oil is exchanged with Tyre: "Judah, and the land of Israel, they were thy merchants: they traded in thy market wheat of Minnith, and Pannag, and honey, and oil, and balm." Hosea 12:1 discusses the context of relations between Ephraim and Egypt: "Ephraim feedeth on wind, and followeth after the east wind: he daily increaseth lies and desolation; and they do make a covenant with the Assyrians, and oil is carried into Egypt".

== Perfume or cosmetic oil ==
There are several biblical references to non-ritual cosmetic use.
