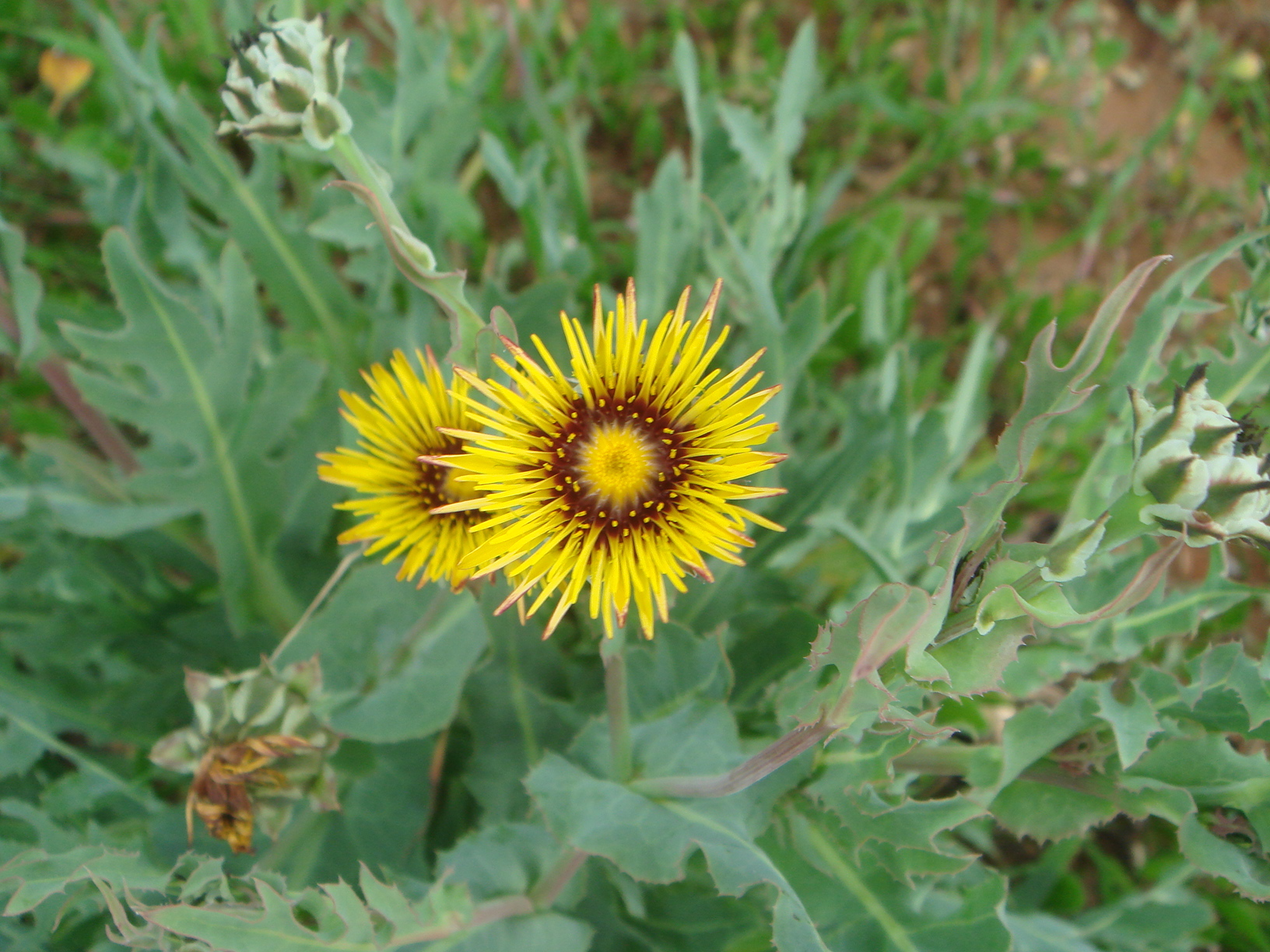
- Reichardia gaditana

Scientific classification
- Kingdom: Plantae
- Clade: Tracheophytes
- Clade: Angiosperms
- Clade: Eudicots
- Clade: Asterids
- Order: Asterales
- Family: Asteraceae
- Subfamily: Cichorioideae
- Tribe: Cichorieae
- Subtribe: Hyoseridinae
- Genus: Reichardia; Roth 1787, not Roth 1800 (Plantaginaceae) nor Roth 1821 (Fabaceae) nor Dennst. 1818 (Apocynaceae)

Synonyms
- Picridium Desf.

= Reichardia =

Genus of plants

Reichardia is a genus of plants in the tribe Cichorieae within the family Asteraceae native to the Mediterranean and western Asia. In Crete, Greece the leaves and tender shoots of a variety of Reichardia picroides called galatsida (γαλατσίδα) are eaten raw, boiled, cooked in steam or browned with olive oil by the locals. Brighteyes is a common name for plants in this genus.

Species

- Reichardia baetica M.J.Gallego & Talavera
- Reichardia canariensis M.J.Gallego & Talavera
- Reichardia crystallina (Sch.Bip. ex Sch.Bip.) Bramwell
- Reichardia dichotoma (DC.) Freyn
- Reichardia famarae Bramwell & G.Kunkel ex M.J.Gallego & Talavera
- Reichardia gaditana (Willk.) Samp.
- Reichardia intermedia (Sch.Bip.) Samp.
- Reichardia ligulata (Vent.) G.Kunkel & Sunding
- Reichardia picroides (L.) Roth – common brighteyes
- Reichardia × sventenia M.J.Gallego & Talavera
- Reichardia tingitana (L.) Roth
