= KTC =

KTC is an initialism for the following:

- Kadamba Transport Corporation
- Karnataka Theological College
- Kentucky Transportation Cabinet
- Korea Tungsten Company (TaeguTec), Korea
- Kill Time Communication, Japanese publishing company
- Kemnal Technology College, secondary school and college in southeast London, UK
- KTC Technology, Chinese electronic display manufacturer listed on the Shenzhen Stock Exchange
