= Kfar Vradim =

Town in northern Israel

Kfar Vradim: כְּפַר-וְרָדִים; כפר ורדים
- Local council

Hebrew transcription(s)
  - ISO 259: Kpar Wradim
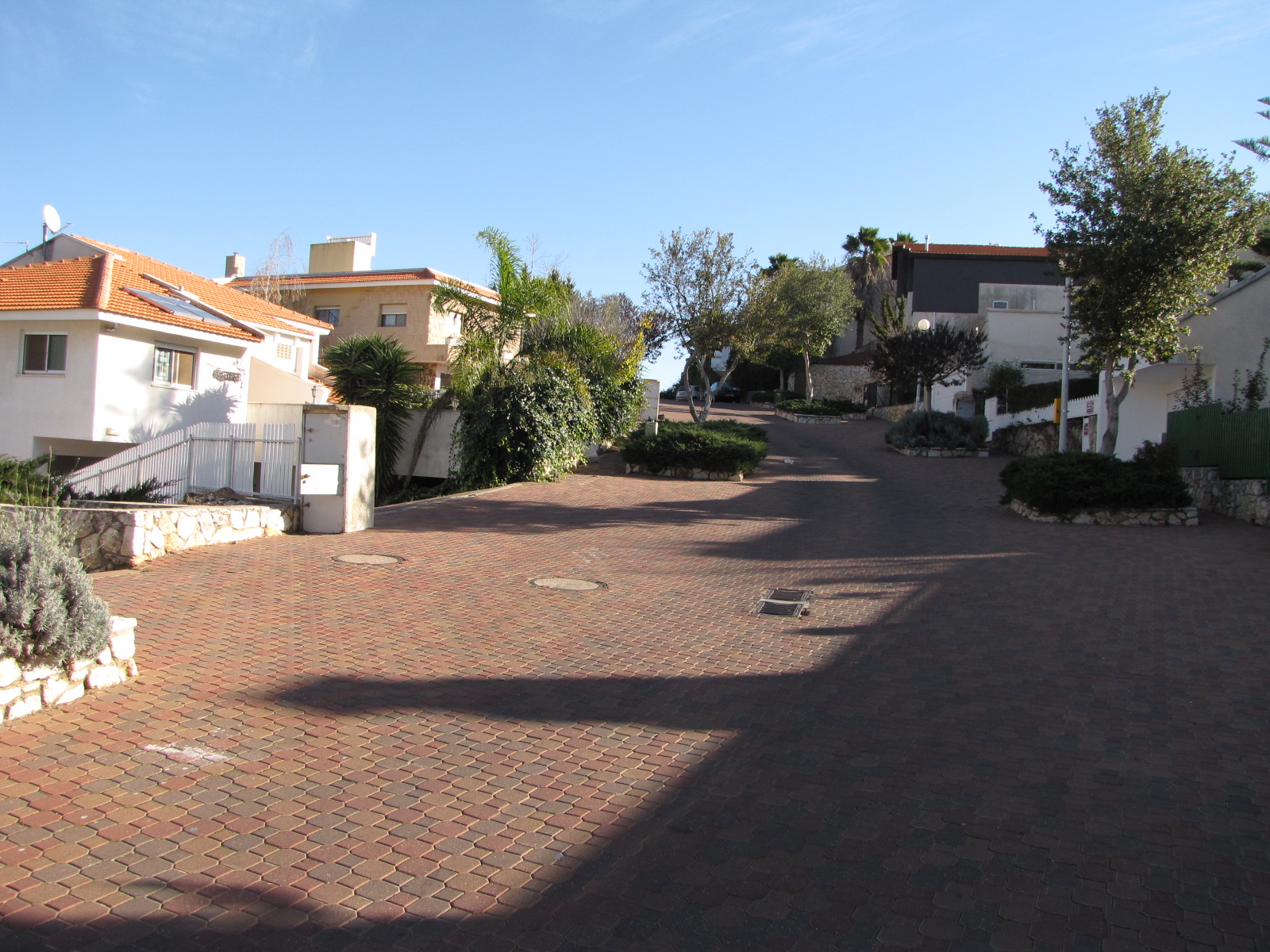

- Location within Northwest Israel Location within Israel
- Coordinates: 32°59′26″N 35°16′25″E
- Country: Israel
- District: Northern
- Subdistrict: Acre
- Natural Region: Yehi'am
- Founded: 1984

Government
  - Head of Municipality: Eyal Shmueli

Area
  - Total: 4,701 dunams (4.701 km^{2}; 1.815 sq mi)

Population (2024)
  - Total: 5,534
  - Density: 1,177/km^{2} (3,049/sq mi)
- Name meaning: Village of Roses

Kfar Vradim (Hebrew: כְּפַר וְרָדִים) is a town (local council) in northern Israel, with a population of 5,534 in 2024. It is situated south of Ma'alot-Tarshiha and about 14 kilometres (8.7 mi) south of the border with Lebanon. Kfar Vradim is close to Ma'alot-Tarshiha (2 kilometers), Karmiel (16 kilometers) and Nahariya (20 kilometers). In 2018 it had a population of 5800.

== History ==
Kfar Vradim was established by Stef Wertheimer to create an industrial town in rural surroundings. The first families were mostly workers of ISCAR Metalworking, owned by Wertheimer, which manufactures metal blades and high performance cutting tools. Kfar Vradim is located near Ma'alot-Tarshiha and Yanuh-Jat, and is connected to the highway by Road 854. Road 8721 runs through the town, connecting it to Yanuh-Jat.

As of 2018, there were contentious plans to build 2,200 new housing units, more than doubling the number of households in the town.

== Demographics ==
In 2022, 90.6% of the population was Jewish, 2.2% was Christian, 1% was Druze, 0.8% was Muslim and 5.4% was counted as other.

== Climate ==
Kfar Vradim is situated between 550–620 meters (1800–2050 feet) above sea level, providing for a relatively dry and Mediterranean climate. Peak temperatures in Kfar Vradim in summer typically reach about 38 °C (100 °F), while its January and February temperatures can drop to as low as −2 °C (28 °F). Average temperatures range from 10 to 15 °C (50 to 59 °F) in the winter to 28–32 °C (82–90 °F) at summer. Precipitation is mostly between October and March and is mainly made up of rain showers and scarce snowfall.

== Education ==
Kfar Vradim has an elementary school (Keshet school) and a middle school (Amirim middle school) which is also a high school since 2013.

== Voting Patterns ==
In the 2022 election, 76 percent of voters in Kfar Vradim voted for the parties of the center-left coalition led by Yair Lapid, while 18 percent voted for the parties of the right-wing coalition led by Benjamin Netanyahu and 3 percent voted for the Arab parties.

In the 2026 election, 75 percent of voters in Kfar Vradim voted for the parties of the center-left coalition led by Gadi Eisenkot, while 16 percent voted for the parties of the right-wing coalition led by Benjamin Netanyahu and 3 percent voted for the Arab parties. An additional 3.3 percent voted for the Reservists, and 1.9 percent voted for Amcha Yisrael. Voter turnout increased 14 percent from the 2022 election.

== Notable residents ==
- Shani Boianjiu, novelist.
- Matti Caspi, musician.
- Romi Gonen, kidnapped to Gaza during the October 7 attacks

== Twin towns ==
Kfar Vradim is twinned with:

- Castrillo Mota de Judíos, Spain
