= TaeguTec =

Cutting tool manufacturer in Daegu, Korea

TaeguTec Ltd.
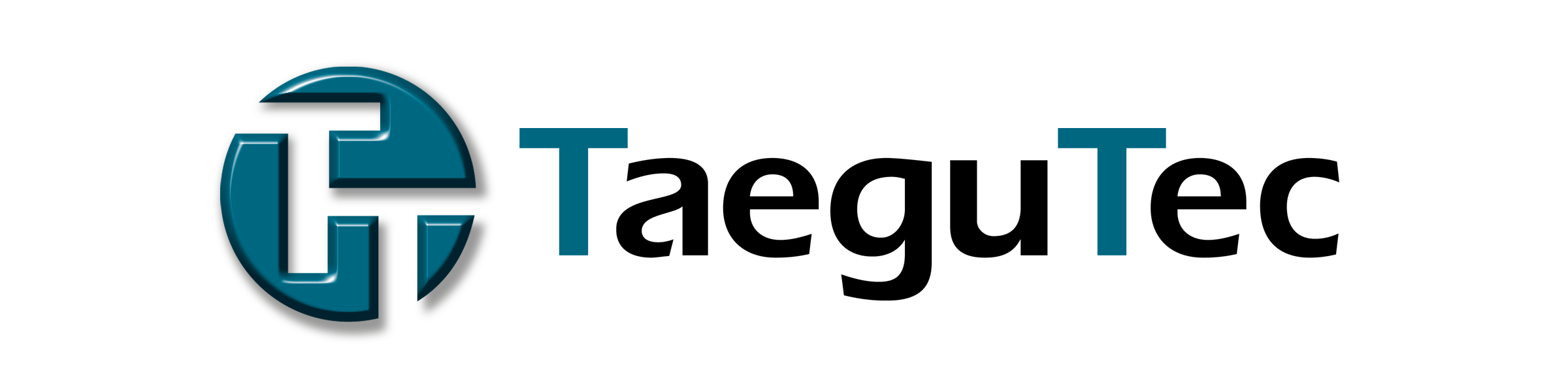
- Company type: Private company
- Industry: Machinery
- Predecessor: Korea Tungsten Co.
- Founded: 1952; 74 years ago
- Headquarters: Taegu, South Korea
- Area served: Worldwide
- Key people: Han Hyun-jun (President and CEO)
- Number of employees: 2,200 (2018)
- Parent: IMC Group
- Subsidiaries: 26
- Website: http://www.taegutec.com/

TaeguTec Ltd. (Korean: 대구텍), formerly known as Korea Tungsten Company, is a multinational corporation headquartered in Daegu, Korea. TaeguTec group has 26 overseas subsidiaries, over 130 distributors and 30 agents in 50 countries across Europe, Asia, Australia, and the Americas.

In addition to the initial 80 per cent stake purchased in 2006, Warren Buffett paid an additional US$2 billion for the remaining stake in IMC, of which TaeguTec was a part. Through this acquisition, TaeguTec became Berkshire Hathaway's first and only wholly owned subsidiary in Korea. On October 25, 2007, Warren Buffett flew to Daegu to tour TaeguTec and to meet with the management. On March 21, 2011, Warren Buffett re-visited the firm to attend the TaeguTec Plant 2 inauguration ceremony and later met with Korean President Lee Myung-bak.

== History ==
=== Before 1960s ===
- Apr. 1916: Outcrop of Sang-dong mine discovered in Gangwon Province, South Korea
- Feb. 1947: Exported Scheelite to the U.S. for the first time
- Sep. 1952: Korea Tungsten Company (KTC) was established by the Korean government
  - Export: US$16,457,000 (56% of Korean total)
  - Employee: 4,287
- May. 1959: Constructed chemical processing plant

=== 1960s ===
- Jun. 1961: Established New York office
- Sep. 1961: Established R&D Center
- Nov. 1961: Established London office
- Feb. 1963: Established Tokyo office
- Nov. 1966: Won official commendation from government for export
  - Ranked second among Korean companies
- Nov. 1967: Won official commendation from government for export
  - Ranked third among Korean companies
- Feb. 1968: POSCO established as a joint venture between the Korean government and KTC (government 75%; KTC 25%)
- Nov. 1968: Won official commendation from government for export
- Nov. 1969: Won official commendation from government for export

=== 1970s ===
- Nov. 1972: Constructed APT (Ammonium Para Tungstate) plant
- Feb. 1974: Constructed tungsten metal powder and tungsten carbide powder plant
- Nov. 1976: Established Rotterdam office
- Nov. 1977: Constructed cemented carbide plant
  - Products: Blank, carbide insert, mining tools, brazed tools
- Oct. 1978: Constructed coating plant (CVD-TiN production)
- Dec. 1979: Constructed tool holder plant

=== 1980s ===
- Jan. 1981: Developed special coating substrate
- May 1983: Rotterdam office in the Netherlands moved to Germany
- Jul. 1985: Common R&D cooperation between Korea Tungsten and POSCO
- Oct. 1985: Developed CERMET inserts
- Nov. 1988: Constructed carbide roll plant
- Nov. 1989: Constructed tungsten wire plant

=== 1990s ===
- Mar. 1991: Constructed ceramic plant
- Feb. 1994: Sang-dong tungsten mine closed
- Mar. 1994: Privatized and taken over by Keopyung Group
- May. 1995: Established tungsten wire plant in China
- Aug. 1998: KTC bought out by Iscar
- Aug. 1998: Company name changed from Korea Tungsten Company to TaeguTec Ltd.
- Feb. 1999: Headquarters moved from Seoul to Taegu
- Apr. 1999: Constructed new Marketing Center
  - 1999: Established TaeguTec USA (currently Ingersoll USA)
  - 1999: Established TaeguTec Germany (currently Ingersoll GmbH)

=== 2000s ===
- Mar. 2000: Established TaeguTec India in Bangalore
- Mar. 2000: Established TaeguTec UK in Leeds
- Jul. 2000: Constructed new R&D Center
- Dec. 2000: Established TaeguTec China in Shanghai
- Mar. 2001: Established TaeguTec Brazil in São Paulo
- Jun. 2001: Established TaeguTec Scandinavia in Copenhagen, Denmark
- Jun. 2002: Established TaeguTec Italy in Turin & Milan
- Jun. 2004: Established TaeguTec Japan in Nagoya
- Jun. 2004: Constructed new Tech Center and Carbide Rod factory
- Jun. 2005: Established TaeguTec Australia in Sydney
- Oct. 2005: Established TaeguTec Turkey in Istanbul
- Mar. 2006: Established TaeguTec Slovakia in Žilina
- Apr. 2006: Established TaeguTec Malaysia in Kuala Lumpur
- Jan. 2007: Established TaeguTec Thailand in Bangkok
- Feb. 2007: Established TaeguTec Spain in Barcelona
- Mar. 2007: Established TaeguTec France in Champs-sur-Marne
- Jul. 2007: Established TaeguTec Indonesia in Bekasi
- Nov. 2007: Established TaeguTec Poland in Wrocław
- Apr. 2008: Established TaeguTec Russia in Moscow
- Apr. 2008: Established TaeguTec Ukraine in Dnipropetrovsk
- Jun. 2009: Established TaeguTec South Africa in Johannesburg
- Sep. 2009: Established TaeguTec Czech in Plzeň
- Nov. 2009: Established TaeguTec Hungary in Törökbálint
- Nov. 2010: Established TaeguTec Argentina in Buenos Aires
- Apr. 2012: Opened TaeguTec Plant II
- May 2012: TaeguTec acquired the internationally recognized AEO certification from the World Customs Organization
- Dec. 2012: TaeguTec received “$300 million Export Tower” by the Korean government
- Jan. 2013: TaeguTec Recognized for Wellbeing of Workers by the Korean government
- Jan. 2013: 2012 Excellent Enterprises in Job Creation (MOEL) by the Korean government
- May 2013: Berkshire Hathaway acquired the remaining 20 percent of the IMC Group to become sole owner
- Mar. 2014: Established TaeguTec Taiwan in Kaohsiung

== Awards and events ==
- Received a "$100 million Export Tower" award (2005)
- Warren Buffett visited TaeguTec (2007)
- Received a "$200 million Export Tower" award (2008)
- Warren Buffett attended TaeguTec Plant 2 inauguration ceremony (2011)
