= Maya Wertheimer =

Israeli actress and model

- מאיה ורטהיימר
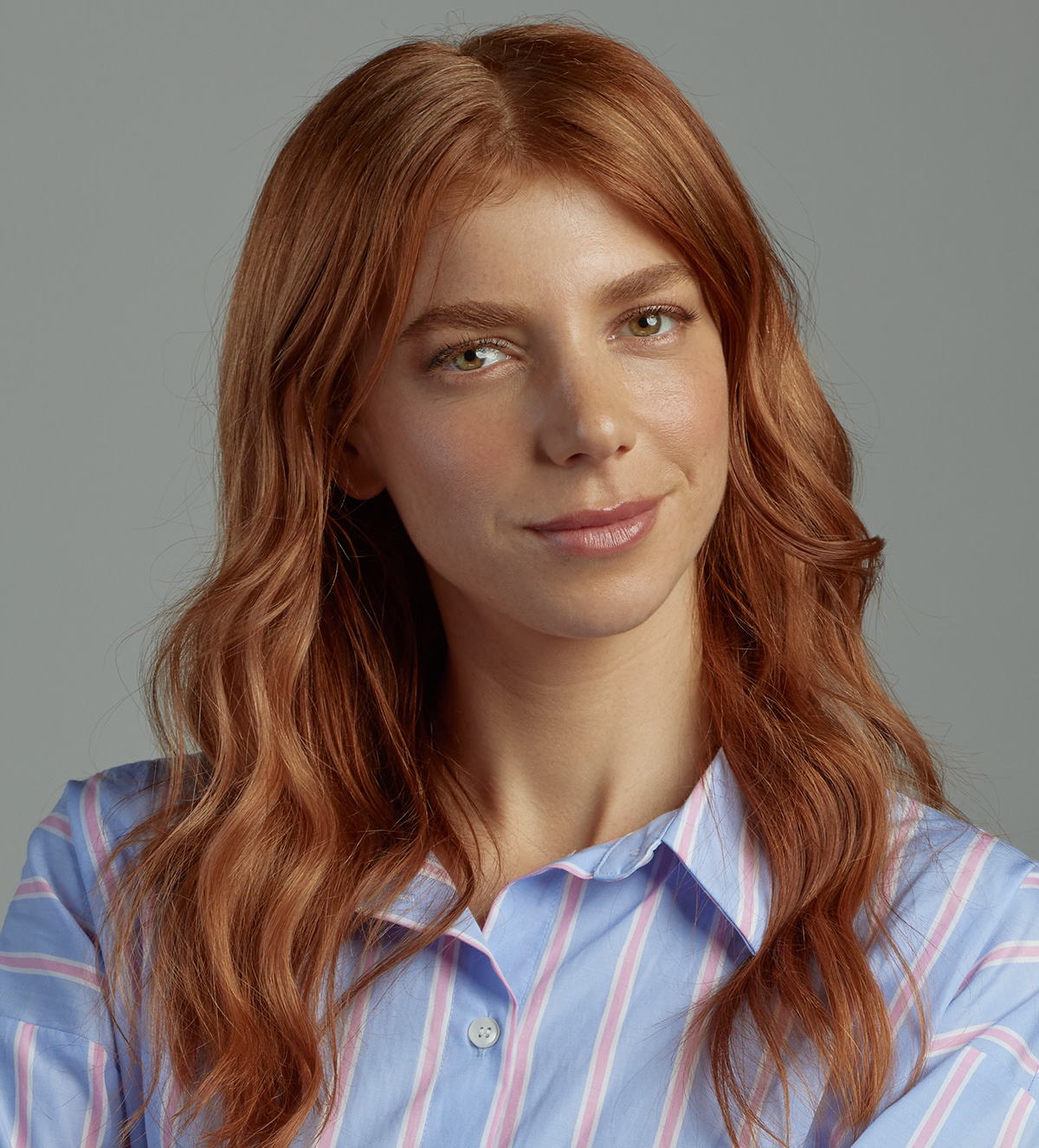
- Born: 29 July 1990 (age 35); Kfar Vradim, Israel
- Other name: Maya Wertheimer-Zamir
- Occupations: Actress; model; television presenter
- Years active: 2011–present
- Spouse: Asaf Zamir
- Children: 2
- Relatives: Stef Wertheimer (grandfather); Yitzhak Zamir (uncle-in-law)

Maya Wertheimer (Hebrew: מאיה ורטהיימר; born 29 July 1990) is an Israeli actress, model and television presenter.

She starred in the Israeli comedy drama series, Shababnikim (2017–2025).

== Early life ==
Maya Wertheimer was born in Kfar Vradim. She is the daughter of billionaire Eitan Wertheimer (1951–2022, son of Israeli industrialist billionaire and former Knesset member Stef Wertheimer) and Ariela. She is the half-sister of Israeli singer Sivan Talmore.

Wertheimer studied theater at Maagan Michael High School and joined Orna Porat's theater circle. She studied at the Nissan Nativ Acting Studio.

== Personal life ==
Wertheimer is married to Asaf Zamir, the former Israeli Consul General in New York City, a former Knesset member on behalf of the Blue and White Party, a former Minister of Tourism and a former deputy and acting mayor of Tel Aviv-Yafo. Their daughter Asia Miriam was born in January 2020. Their son, Noah Ethan, was born on August 2024.

She holds a teaching certificate in yoga, which she pursued in the wake of injuries in a hit-and-run accident that left her in a wheelchair for several months.
