= IMC Group =

IMC Group may refer to:

- International Metalworking Companies, the second largest company for metalworking products
- International Media JS Company, a Vietnamese multimedia group known as IMC Group, who own MTV (Vietnam)
- IMC Global, a mining and production company now part of The Mosaic Group
