= Korea Tungsten Company =

Defunct South Korean metalworks

Korea Tungsten Co., Ltd. 대한중석
- Company type: State enterprise (~1994); Private (1994~)
- Industry: Metalworking
- Founded: 1916
- Founder: Government of South Korea
- Headquarters: Seoul, Taegu

Korea Tungsten Company (KTC, Korean: 대한중석; Hanja: 大韓重石; RR: daehan jungseok) was a major South Korean manufacturer of tungsten cutting tools, tungsten powder, and related metal-cutting products. It was the 28th-largest chaebol by asset with subsidiaries such as Korea Tungsten Construction and Korea Sintered Metal. In 1952, KTC appointed its first President, Ahn Taek Jun. With the national government, KTC also established POSCO, which is now the world's second largest steelmaker by output. In 1998, Keo-Pyung, then KTC's proprietor, defaulted on its loans and was declared bankrupt by its main creditor, CHB Bank. On May 12, 1998, Keo-Pyung announced that it would shed 14 of its 19 companies, Korea Tungsten among them. ISCAR, the predecessor and now the largest arm of IMC, bought KTC after months of negotiations, and renamed it TaeguTec. Today, TaeguTec group has become a global tooling and solutions giant with 25 overseas subsidiaries and over 130 distributors in 50 countries throughout the world.

== History ==
The history of KTC dates back to April 1916, when the Sangdong Tungsten Mine was discovered in Gangwon Province, South Korea. Ever since, the company had grown to be one of the most successful and influential companies in Korea, accounting for 60 per cent of the country's total export revenue in the 60s and 70s.

=== Before 1960s ===
- Apr. 1916: Outcrop of Sang-dong mine discovered in Gangwon Province, South Korea
- Feb. 1936: Established SOLIM Mining Co. Ltd.
- Feb. 1947: Export Scheelite to the USA for the first time
- Sep. 1952: Established Korea Tungsten Co. Ltd. (State Enterprise)
  - Export: US$16,457,000 (56% of Korean Total)
  - Employing: 4,287
- May. 1959: Constructed Chemical processing plant

=== 1960s ===
- Jun. 1961: Established New York City Branch office
- Sep. 1961: Established R&D center
- Nov. 1961: Established London Branch office
- Feb. 1963: Established Tokyo Branch office
- Nov. 1966: Won official commendation from government for export
  - Ranked second among Korean companies
- Nov. 1967: Won official commendation from government for export
  - Ranked third among Korean companies
- Feb. 1968: Established POSCO with the National Government (Government 75%, Korea Tungsten Co. Ltd 25%)
- Nov. 1968: Won official commendation from government for export
- Nov. 1969: Won official commendation from government for export

=== 1970s ===
- Nov. 1972: Constructed of APT (Ammonium Para Tungstate) plant
- Feb. 1974: Constructed Tungsten Metal Powder and Tungsten Carbide Powder plant
- Nov. 1976: Established Rotterdam Branch office
- Nov. 1977: Constructed Cemented carbide plant
  - Products: Blank, Carbide insert, Mining tools, Brazed tools
- Oct. 1978: Constructed Coating plant (CVD-TiN production firstly)
- Dec. 1979: Constructed Tool holder plant

=== 1980s ===
- Jan. 1981: Developed Special Coating Substrate
- May 1983: Rotterdam Branch office in Netherlands moved to Germany
- Jul. 1985: Common R&D cooperation between Korea Tungsten Co. Ltd. and POSCO
- Oct. 1985: Developed CERMET Inserts
- Nov. 1988: Constructed Carbide Roll plant
- Nov. 1989: Constructed Tungsten Wire plant

=== 1990s ===
- Mar. 1991: Constructed Ceramic plant
- Feb. 1994: Sang-Dong Tungsten mine closed
- Mar. 1994: Privatized and taken over by Keo-Pyung Group in Korea
- May. 1995: Established Tungsten Wire plant in China
- Aug. 1998: Korea Tungsten Co. Ltd. bought out by Iscar
- Aug. 1998: Company name changed from Korea Tungsten Co. Ltd to TaeguTec Ltd.

=== Post-merger / TaeguTec era ===
- Feb. 1999: Headquarters moved to Daegu from Seoul
- Apr. 1999: Constructed new Marketing Center
  - 1999: Established TaeguTec USA (The present Ingersoll USA – Rockford)
  - 1999: Established TaeguTec Germany (The present Ingersoll GMBH – Haiger)
- Mar. 2000: Established TaeguTec cutting tools factory in India
- Jul. 2000: Constructed new R&D Center
- Dec. 2000: Established TaeguTec China in Shanghai
- Mar. 2001: Established TaeguTec Brazil in São Paulo
- Jun. 2001: Established TaeguTec Scandinavia in Copenhagen
- Jun. 2002: Established TaeguTec UK in Leeds
- Jun. 2002: Established TaeguTec Italy in Turin & Milan
- Jun. 2004: Established TaeguTec Japan in Nagoya
- Jun. 2004: Constructed new Tech Center and Carbide Rod factory
- Jun. 2005: Established TaeguTec Australia in Sydney
- Oct. 2005: Established TaeguTec Turkey in Istanbul
- Mar. 2006: Established TaeguTec Slovakia in Žilina
- Apr. 2006: Established TaeguTec Malaysia in Kuala Lumpur
- Jan. 2007: Established TaeguTec Thailand in Bangkok
- Feb. 2007: Established TaeguTec Spain in Barcelona
- Mar. 2007: Established TaeguTec France in Champs-sur-Marne
- Jul. 2007: Established TaeguTec Indonesia in Bekasi
- Nov. 2007: Established TaeguTec Poland in Wrocław
- Apr. 2008: Established TaeguTec Russia in Moscow
- Apr. 2008: Established TaeguTec Ukraine in Dnipro
- Jun. 2009: Established TaeguTec South Africa in Johannesburg
- Sep. 2009: Established TaeguTec Czech in Plzeň
- Nov. 2009: Established TaeguTec Hungary in Törökbálint

== See also ==
- Economy of South Korea
- Government of South Korea
