= Selig Soskin =

Israeli agronomist and early Zionist (1873–1959)

- זליג סוסקין
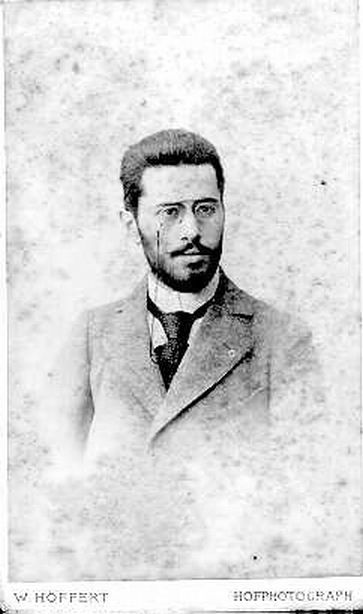
- Born: 1873; Churubash, Crimea, Russian Empire
- Died: 26 February 1959 (aged 85–86); Israel
- Known for: Co-founding Nahariya; intensive agriculture and hydroponics
- Awards: Israel Prize (1958)
- Scientific career
- Fields: Agronomy
- Workplaces: Jewish National Fund
- Education: Studied agronomy in Germany
- Notable work: Intensive Cultivation and Close Settlement (1926)

Selig Soskin (Hebrew: זליג סוסקין; 1873 – 26 February 1959) was an Israeli agronomist and an early member of the Zionist movement. An advocate of intensive farming on small plots, he headed the settlement department of the Jewish National Fund from 1918 to 1923, co-founded the coastal town of Nahariya in 1934, and later promoted hydroponics. He was awarded the Israel Prize for agriculture in 1958.

== Biography ==
=== Early life and Ottoman Palestine ===
Soskin was born in 1873 in Churubash, Crimea, then part of the Russian Empire. He studied agronomy in Germany and was active in the Zionist movement while in Russia. In 1896 he settled in Ottoman Palestine, where he worked as a plantation expert for Hovevei Zion.

He was one of the founders of the settlement of Be'er Tuvia (until then known as Qastina, after the neighboring Palestinian village of the same name), and worked on the planting of eucalyptus to drain the swamps of Hadera.

In 1898, Soskin accompanied Theodor Herzl during his visit to Palestine, and subsequently assisted in research to examine the possibilities for agriculture in different regions in the country. In 1903, he participated in the Sixth Zionist Congress, where he was elected to the Committee for the Study of Eretz Israel, along with Otto Warburg and Franz Oppenheimer. In connection with the works of the committee, he was part of a delegation to El Arish, in the northern Sinai, to investigate the area at the request of Herzl. Part of his agricultural research was conducted in collaboration with Aaron Aaronsohn, with whom he became friends while in Zichron Yaacov in the early part of the twentieth century.

=== Africa and the Jewish National Fund ===
From 1906 to 1915, Soskin worked as an agricultural adviser in German South West Africa.

From 1918 to 1923, he was director of the settlement department of the Jewish National Fund (the "JNF"), at its central office, then located in The Hague. Following a tour of Europe, he developed a model of settlement based on intensive agriculture on small plots of land, which he tried to implement in the Binyamina district.

=== Revisionist Zionism ===
In 1926 he joined Ze'ev Jabotinsky's Revisionist movement as its spokesman on agricultural settlement, and from 1927 he represented the Union of Zionist Revisionists at the League of Nations in Geneva. After the Revisionist movement split in 1933, he joined the Jewish State Party.

=== Nahariya ===
His model of intensive farming saw success with the founding of Nahariya, where he established an experimental intensive farm. Work on the settlement began in 1934 under a company limited by shares headed by Soskin together with the civil engineer Joseph Loewy, the financial expert Heinrich Cohn and the engineer Simon Reich. The company bought land on the northern coast from the Toueini family and, after improving it and dividing it into plots, offered the plots to German Jewish immigrants who had fled Nazi persecution. The first residents, two immigrant couples, settled there permanently on 10 February 1935, the date now regarded as the town's founding.

=== Hydroponics ===
In his later years Soskin championed the use of hydroponics, growing plants in water without soil. In 1944 he proposed a plan to feed liberated Europe with hydroponic vegetables, and in 1945 he founded an experimental hydroponics station in Ramat Gan.

== Selected works ==
- Small Holding and Irrigation (1920)
- Intensive Cultivation and Close Settlement (1926)
- The Escape from the Impasse (1927)
- Land Settlement in Palestine (1929)

== Awards and honours ==
- In 1958, Soskin was awarded the Israel Prize in agriculture.
- A street in Nahariya is named after him.

== See also ==
- List of Israel Prize recipients
