= Tungaloy Corporation =

Japanese cutting tools manufacturer

- Company type: Private
- Industry: Machinery, Manufacturing
- Founded: December 19, 1934
- Headquarters: Iwaki, Fukushima, Japan
- Area served: Worldwide
- Key people: Jacob Harpaz (Chairman); Satoshi Kinoshita (President & CEO)
- Products: Metal cutting tools, steel products, wear resistant tools, civil engineering tools, and friction materials
- Parent: International Metalworking Companies
- Website: https://www.tungaloy.com

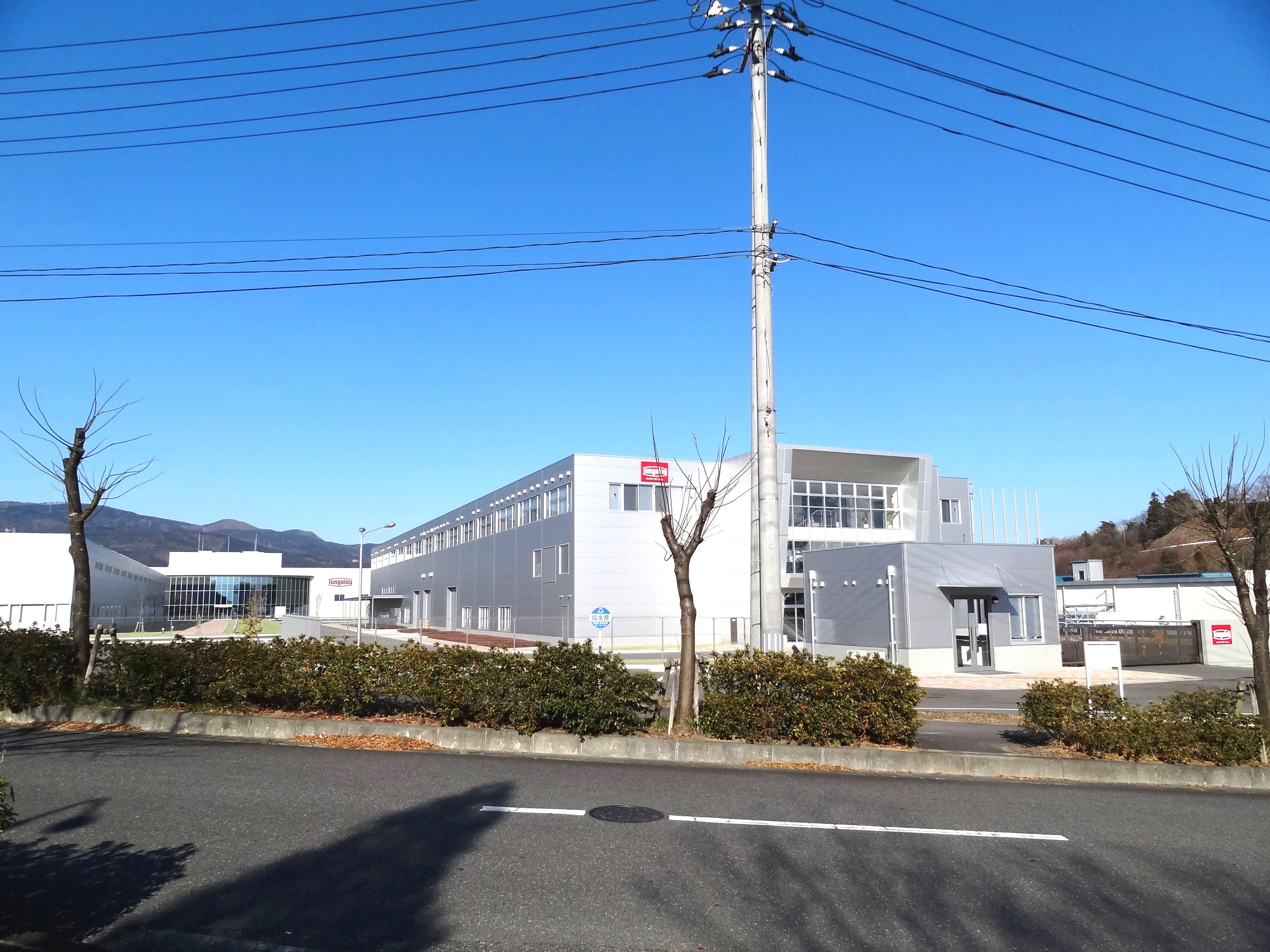
Tungaloy Corporation HQ in Iwaki

Tungaloy Corporation (株式会社タンガロイ, Kabushiki Kaisha Tungaroi) is a company that specializes in production and sales of metal cutting tools as well as industrial products. Headquartered in Iwaki, Fukushima, Japan, it was the first company in the country to succeed in developing superhard alloy. Tungaloy is a member of the International Metalworking Companies (IMC), which is owned by Berkshire Hathaway. In November 2011, the company celebrated the opening of its new production facility in Japan; as the Chairman, President, and CEO of Berkshire Hathaway, Warren Buffett took part in the ceremony.

== History ==
August 2008 marked a turning point for the company, as Tungaloy became a member of the International Metalworking Companies (IMC), owned by Warren Buffett’s Berkshire Hathaway. This acquisition led to rapid installation of latest machinery and automation in its production facilities as well as advanced its R&D laboratories. In 2010, Tungaloy’s headquarters, marketing, production, and R&D functions gathered in Iwaki, Fukushima in Japan to streamline communication channels and improve synergy between the departments. The company celebrated the opening of its new production plant in 2011 with the presence of Warren Buffett, which turned into his first visit to Japan.

== Products ==
Metal cutting tools, steel products, wear resistant tools, civil engineering tools, and friction materials.

== Serving industries ==
Automobile, construction, die and mould, aerospace, infrastructure, oil and gas, medical, and power, rail and shipbuilding.

== International plants and offices ==
Japan, US, Canada, Mexico, Brazil, Germany, France, Italy, Czech Republic, Spain, Sweden, Russia, Poland, UK, Hungary, Turkey, the Netherlands, Croatia, China, Thailand, Singapore, Vietnam, Indonesia, India, South Korea, Malaysia, and Australia.

== See also ==
- International Metalworking Companies
- Berkshire Hathaway
- Warren Buffett
