= Han Hyun-jun =

South Korean engineer and businessman

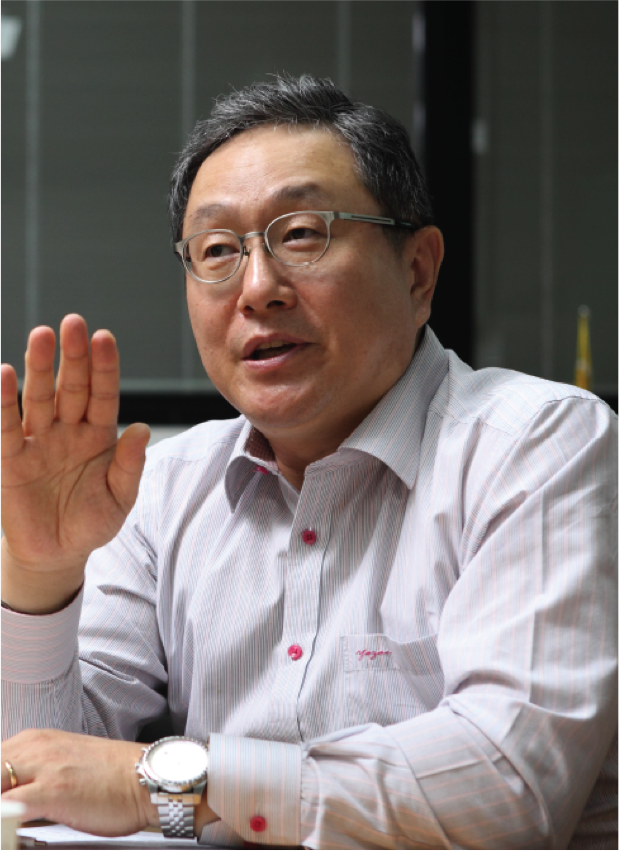
- Han Hyun-jun

President & CEO, TaeguTec
- Incumbent
- Assumed office 2013

Personal details
- Born: Han Hyun-jun Seoul, South Korea
- Profession: Business executive, Engineer

Han Hyun-jun (Korean: 한현준) is a South Korean business executive and engineer, currently serving as the president and CEO of TaeguTec, the largest metalworking company in Asia.
