= 1974 Nahariya attack =

Palestinian attack against civilians in northern Israel

- Part of Palestinian insurgency in South Lebanon
- The attack site
- Native name: הפיגוע בנהריה (1974)
- Location: 33°0′16″N 35°5′24″E; Nahariya, Israel
- Date: 24–25 June 1974; 23:00 pm – 3:20 am (UTC+2)
- Attack type: Mass shooting
- Weapons: Rifles, grenades
- Deaths: 3 Israeli civilians and 1 Israeli soldier (+3 attackers)
- Injuries: 7 Israeli soldiers and 1 Israeli civilian
- Perpetrator: Fatah

The 1974 Nahariya attack was a raid by three Fatah militants late at night on 24 June 1974. The militants infiltrated the coastal city of Nahariya in Israel by sea from Lebanon in the first attack of its kind in the conflict. Three civilians and one Israeli soldier were killed.

== Attack ==
Shortly after 23:00 on 24 June 1974, three Fatah militants, reached the coast of the Israeli city of Nahariya, using an engine run Zodiac inflatable boat. It is believed that their target was the Ga'aton cinema, where they would perform a mass attack at the end of a film screening. The militants headed eastward straight into Nahariya. After crossing Balfour Street, they tried to cross a hedge. The noise they made caught the attention of a teenager who lived on the first floor of a nearby apartment building. He looked out of the window, spotted them in the light of streetlights, and raised the alarm. As a result, two patrolling officers of the Nahariya Civil Guard who were nearby rushed to the area. When the militants spotted them they threw a hand grenade and fired at them. The officers returned fire while taking cover. The time was 23:10.

The sound of gunfire alerted Israeli security forces in Nahariya. In addition, an Israeli army officer who lived nearby, Major Yitzhak Israel, called the police, then barricaded himself at the entrance to prevent the militants from entering his building. Local police, as well as reserve army officers and soldiers who were in Nahariya soon began arriving at the site. At 23:15, a jeep driven by police superintendent Meir Almagor appeared on the scene, and was shot at by the militants. Almagor then exited the jeep and ran into the nearby municipal court building, where he called the army's Northern Command and established a permanent telephone contact. The militants were forced into the parking lot of an apartment building, and one broke into the building. Israeli security forces, who were arriving in growing numbers, surrounded the area to prevent their escape, and also took up positions on the roof of the municipal court building and on a nearby school. Residents of the apartment building, who understood they were being attacked by militants, locked themselves in their apartments, piled furniture near the doors and took shelter in the inner rooms. One resident of a nearby apartment building, journalist Yehuda Arieli, spotted two of the militants in the parking lot and shot at them with his pistol. They returned fire and threw a grenade in his direction.

Mordechai Zarnekin, who lived on the first floor of the building, feared that the militants would break into his apartment and had his wife Irka, son Gilad, and daughter Ronit escape the apartment from the bedroom window on a rope woven from sheets. After reaching ground, they began running toward the street, but were spotted by the militants, who shot at them and threw a grenade, killing all three of them. Zarnekin, who thought that he had saved his family, tried to escape the apartment as well, but was accidentally shot by Israeli security forces. Wounded, he returned to his apartment, where he hid until found by soldiers.

Colonel Shai Tamari of the Oded Brigade initially took command of the security forces on the scene when he arrived; he passed command over to Major-General Rafael Eitan, head of the Northern Command. Eitan arrived together with Captain Mordechai Ben-Shach, commander of the Golani Brigade's Sayeret Golani unit.

Soldiers from Battalion 12 of the Golani Brigade, based at Camp Shraga, near Nahariya, were called to the scene; the first Golani unit, commanded by Lieutenant Eldad Ronny, arrived at 23:50. The unit arrived at the eastern perimeter of the building, and was spotted by the militants in the parking lot, who were hiding behind cars. The militants opened fire at them and threw grenades. The soldiers returned fire, and Golani soldiers positioned on the roof of a nearby school also opened fire, possibly wounding the two militants. Shrapnel from a grenade injured one soldier.

=== Counter operation ===
After the contractor that constructed the building provided a detailed explanation of its structure to the army, a plan for a counter operation was formed. The operation began at 2:10 am, when Israeli soldiers stormed the house. At 2:25 while attempting to open a door, several shots were fired and three grenades were thrown out of the room by a militant. The shots and the shrapnel from the grenades killed an Israeli soldier, First Sergeant Dan Szenes, and wounded five. The militant, who was also seriously injured, attempted to crawl out onto the roof, and was identified by the commander of the commando unit in charge of the operation. The commander charged at him and killed him. Afterwards, soldiers swept through the building, hunting for additional militants. During their search, they broke into Mordechai Zarnekin's apartment, where they found him lying wounded. He was treated on the scene and evacuated. Meanwhile, soldiers searching the parking lot found and killed the two other militants. The operation ended officially at 03:20 am.

Three civilians and one Israeli soldier were killed during the event, while seven soldiers and one civilian were injured.

== Aftermath ==
Two weeks after the raid, Israeli gunboats bombarded three Lebanese ports in retaliation, reportedly after Israel received indications that another seaborne attack was planned. The Israeli government claimed the attack was a warning, and that efforts were made to avoid casualties. The Lebanese government reported that one civilian was wounded, and that 21 fishing boats were sunk. Palestinian guerrillas claimed that the Israeli navy also shelled two small fishing villages. Leaflets were dropped in the ports that were attacked, explaining the raid and warning fishermen against helping guerrillas to launch attacks. Following the raid, several rockets were fired into northern Israel from Lebanon, and Israeli troops exchanged fire with gunmen across the Lebanese border throughout the night, with no casualties reported.

Israel recognized its vulnerability to seaborne terrorism, and increased security measures. Permanent naval patrols along Israel's Mediterranean coast were set up, along with radar stations and coastal lookouts. Maritime security zones were set up in the northern coastal area, where boating, civilian shipping, and swimming was prohibited. This almost completely stopped maritime terrorism; the last successful attack, which also took place in Nahariya, occurred in 1979.

The attack also resulted in the establishment of the Civil Guard. Until then, individual Israeli cities and towns had maintained their own civil guards. Following the attack, enrollment in the Nahariya Civil Guard skyrocketed, and within two days of the attack, it had about 900 members. On 10 July 1974, a national Civil Guard was established as a part of the Israel Police.
