= POSRI =

South Korean research institute

POSCO Research Institute (POSRI)
- Industry: R&D
- Founded: 28, Feb, 1985
- Headquarters: Seoul, South Korea
- Key people: Choi Jong-Tae (Chief Executive Officer)
- Revenue: ▲US$ 27.04 million (2011)
- Operating income: ▼US$ 0.21 million (2011)
- Net income: ▲US$ 0.13 million (2011)
- Website: http://www.posri.re.kr/eng/

POSCO Research Institute (POSRI) is a private research institute which provides research-based consulting services for the steel industry. POSRI conducts analysis of the current economic and managerial issues, as well as researches the forward and backward related industries to the steel industry, including energy and environment industries.

Today, POSRI works for steel industry, regional and economic study, corporate strategy and management consulting.

== History ==
POSRI, one of the POSCO subsidiaries, was established as POSCO-MERC(Management & Engineering Research Center) within POSCO technology research institute. It was spun off from POSCO technology research institute at 1987 and consist Research Institute of Industrial Science & Technology(RIST). At 1994, it was spun off from RIST and founded as named POSCO Research Institute.

POSRI has held seminars, forums, symposiums, workshops and conferences.

- Selected event
  - Joint Symposium: <Business Policy and Strategic Management in the Global Era: Corporate Success Factors> with Harvard University
  - Joint Seminar: <Technology Transfer under the WTO System> with the Rand Corporation
  - Joint Seminar: <APEC after the Bogor Summit: Paving the Road to Open Regionalism> with the Institute for International Economics
  - Business Forum: <Successful Economic Partnership> with KOTRA and Economic Times
  - Joint Seminar: <Key Challengers for China's Sustained Growth> with the Rand Corporation
  - Joint Seminar: South Korea-Mongolia Partnership (participated by Presidents and government officials)

== Operations ==
=== Steel Industry Research ===
Research for domestic steel industry, Steel marketing and investment strategies, Research for raw material prices, forecast on price and demand-supply of raw materials, Research on the environment and sustainable management.

=== Regional Studies & Economic Research ===
Research on emerging markets, including China and India, Mornitoring economic trends and in-depth analysis on issue, Analysis on domestic and overseas policy issues and response strategies.

=== Corporate Strategy Research ===
Research on POSCO's vision and long-term strategy and Industry/Business strategy of POSCO subsidiaries, Research on energy, green growth and new business, Research on non-feerous materials .

=== Management Consulting ===
Management diagnosis, corporate governance, labor relations, labor management, human resource management and policy development, consultation on corporate innovation & change management.

== Selected articles ==
- Jae-heon Jung,Jung, Jaeheon; Mathur, Kamlesh (2007). "An Efficient Heuristic Algorithm for a Two-Echelon Joint Inventory and Routing Problem". Transportation Science. 41: 55–73. doi:10.1287/trsc.1060.0160.
- Byung-Wook Lee, Seung-Tae Jung, Yun-Ok Chun, Lee, Byung-Wook; Jung, Seung-Tae; Chun, Yun-Ok (2004). "Environmental Accounting in Korea: Cases and Policy Recommendations". Eco-Efficiency in Industry and Science. 9: 175–186. doi:10.1007/0-306-48022-0_13. ISBN 978-1-4020-0552-7.
- Kyung-Hee Jung, Sang-Kyu Lee, Jung, Kyung‐Hee; Lee, Sang‐Kyu (2006). "New paradigm of steel mills in the supply chain of automotive sheets". Supply Chain Management. 11 (4): 328–336. doi:10.1108/13598540610671770.
- Kyung-Hee Jung, Kyung-Hee Jung; Hoyong Kim; Daeseok Rho (1996). "Determination of the installation site and optimal capacity of the battery energy storage system for load leveling". IEEE Transactions on Energy Conversion. 11 (1). Energy Conversion: 162–167. Bibcode:1996ITEnC..11..162J. doi:10.1109/60.486591.
- Kwang-Sook Huh, Huh, Kwang-Sook (2011). "Steel consumption and economic growth in Korea: Long-term and short-term evidence". Resources Policy. 36 (2): 107–113. doi:10.1016/j.resourpol.2011.01.005. S2CID 154380898.
- Jeong-Ho Park, Yoon-gih Ahn, Park, Jeong-ho; Ahn, Yoon-gih (2012). "Strategic environmental management of Korean construction industry in the context of typology models". Journal of Cleaner Production. 23: 158–166. doi:10.1016/j.jclepro.2011.10.032.
