= POSCO Future M =

South Korean company

POSCO Future M Co., Ltd.
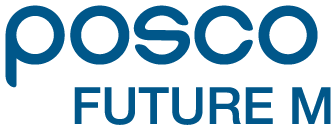
- Native name: 주식회사 포스코퓨처엠
- Formerly: 1963.01 Samhwa Hwasung; 1971.05 Pohang Industrial Furnace Co., Ltd. 1987.03 Pohang Furnace Co., Ltd. 1993.04 Keoyang Furnace Co., Ltd. 1994.12 Pohang Iron and Steel Furnace Equipment Co., Ltd. 2001.04 POSREC Co., Ltd. 2010.03 POSCO Chemtech; 2019.03 POSCO Chemical Co., Ltd. 2023.03 POSCO FUTURE M Co., Ltd.
- Traded as: KRX: 003670
- Industry: Battery material manufacturing refractory ceramic product manufacturing
- Founded: 1971; 55 years ago
- Headquarters: 110, Sinhang-ro, Nam-gu, Pohang-si, Gyeongsangbuk-do, Republic of Korea
- Area served: Pohang, Gwangyang, Sejong, Gumi, Seoul, Canada, Zhejiang, Indonesia
- Key people: Yoo Byeong-Og (CEO)
- Products: Refractories, cathodes, anodes
- Revenue: 4,759,871,486,000 KRW (2023)
- Operating income: 35,882,186,000 KRW (2023)
- Net income: 4,435,220,000 KRW (2023)
- Total assets: 6,334,593,298,000 KRW (2023)
- Number of employees: 2,815 (2023)
- Website: https://www.poscofuturem.com/en/

POSCO Future M Co., Ltd. (Korean: 주식회사 포스코퓨처엠), is a South Korean battery material & chemical company that produces cathode and anode materials for lithium-ion batteries, refractories and basic industrial materials.

They changed the company name from POSCO Chemical to POSCO FUTURE M in March 2023.

== Businesses ==
=== Battery materials ===
POSCO Future M produces cathode active materials and anodes for EV batteries. It is showing rapid growth by receiving a total of approximately 100 trillion won in cathode material orders from major domestic battery companies (LG Energy Solution, Samsung SDI, etc.) in 2023. As of 2023, it has a production capacity of 155,000 tons. The company has set a goal of producing 1 million tons of cathode materials by 2030 and is aggressively expanding its plants. They also plan to increase production of precursors and cathode materials from 45,000 tons and 82,000 tons, respectively, in 2023 to 460,000 tons and 370,000 tons in 2030.

=== Industrial and chemical materials ===
POSCO Future M produces and supplies refractories and quicklime, which are basic industrial materials. In addition to this, they also produce advanced chemical materials such as carbon materials and hydrogen peroxide. Recently, they appears that 100% recycling of waste refractories has been successful.

=== ESG ===
Various policies are being implemented under POSCO Group's ESG management philosophy of 'Corporate Citizens Growing Together'. For example, the company publishes 'corporate citizenship report' every year to inform its ESG activities. In addition, by publishing a 'responsible minerals report', they are making it known that they are manufacturing products by procuring minerals that do not involve labor exploitation or funds flowing into illegal organizations. Recently, the company was recognized for its ESG performance by being included in the DJSI Asia Pacific Index.

== Governance Structure ==
Shareholder	Ownership (%)
POSCO Holdings	59.7%
National Pension Service	5.6%
Pohang University of Science and Technology	2.8%

== See also ==
- List of South Korean companies
