= Stef Wertheimer =

Israeli industrialist and politician (1926–2025)

- סטף ורטהיימר
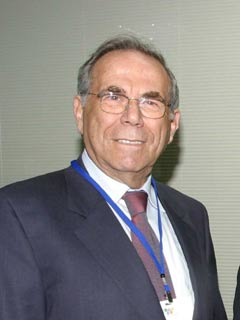

Faction represented in the Knesset
- 1977–1978: Democratic Movement for Change
- 1978–1981: Shinui

Personal details
- Born: 16 July 1926 Kippenheim, Germany
- Died: 26 March 2025 (aged 98)
- Children: 4, including Eitan Wertheimer
- Relatives: Maya Wertheimer (granddaughter)
- Occupation: Businessman
- Office: Honorary chairman, IMC

Stef Wertheimer (Hebrew: זאב סטף ורטהיימר; 16 July 1926 – 26 March 2025) was an Israeli billionaire industrialist, investor, philanthropist and politician. He was a member of the Knesset, and was known for founding industrial parks in Israel and neighboring countries. In 2013, the Wertheimers were described as Israel's richest family.

== Early life and education ==
Stefan "Stef" (Ze'ev) Wertheimer was born in Kippenheim, Germany, to a Jewish family. His father was a World War I veteran and had lost a leg. The family emigrated to Mandatory Palestine in 1937 to escape Nazism. Most of his extended family emigrated to the United States and Latin America. Those who stayed behind perished in the Holocaust. He studied at the Tel-Nordau School in Tel Aviv. At age 13, he was expelled from school following an altercation with a teacher and started working as an apprentice in an optician's shop. After two years, he became an apprentice in a camera repair shop. Then, after about a year, he started studying optics under Professor Emanuel Goldberg, a researcher and inventor who contributed significantly to different aspects of imaging technology in the first half of the twentieth century. He was one of six students selected by Goldberg to study in a training workshop he established. Simultaneously, he took evening high school classes at the Haskala School for two years.

== Career ==
=== World War II ===
With World War II underway, the British authorities asked Goldberg to produce compasses, and Wertheimer participated in a failed research project, trying to improve compass production. He left Goldberg's laboratory and worked as a lathe operator, including in a factory at the Tel Litvinsky military base producing parts for jerrycans. In 1943, he was recruited as a civilian contractor for the Royal Air Force upon the recommendation of Professor Goldberg after the British had asked him to recommend them an optical technician. He was sent to an RAF base in Bahrain, where he repaired optical sights and air conditioners on military aircraft and serviced the base's electricity generator. He learned to repair air conditioners and generators by hurriedly reading instruction manuals after his arrival. During his time as an RAF contractor, he also studied engineering at a British institute in Bahrain in his free time. After seven months, he returned to Palestine and resumed working as a lathe operator.

In 1945, he joined the Palmach, where he served as a technical officer in the "German Unit" – a special guerilla force trained with British cooperation to participate in combat operations against the German army, should it reach Palestine. He was arrested by the British during Operation Agatha in 1946 and was detained for four months. In 1947, he began working in the development and improvement of cannons for the Haganah. During the 1948 Arab-Israeli War, he served as a technical officer in the Yiftach Brigade.

Following the war, Wertheimer and his wife briefly lived on kibbutz Yir'on. They left as he did not agree with the socialist economic model adopted by the kibbutz movement. He worked at Israel Military Industries and then at Rafael. In 1952, he was dismissed from his job at Rafael as he lacked a formal engineering degree, which led him to start his own business.

=== Business career ===
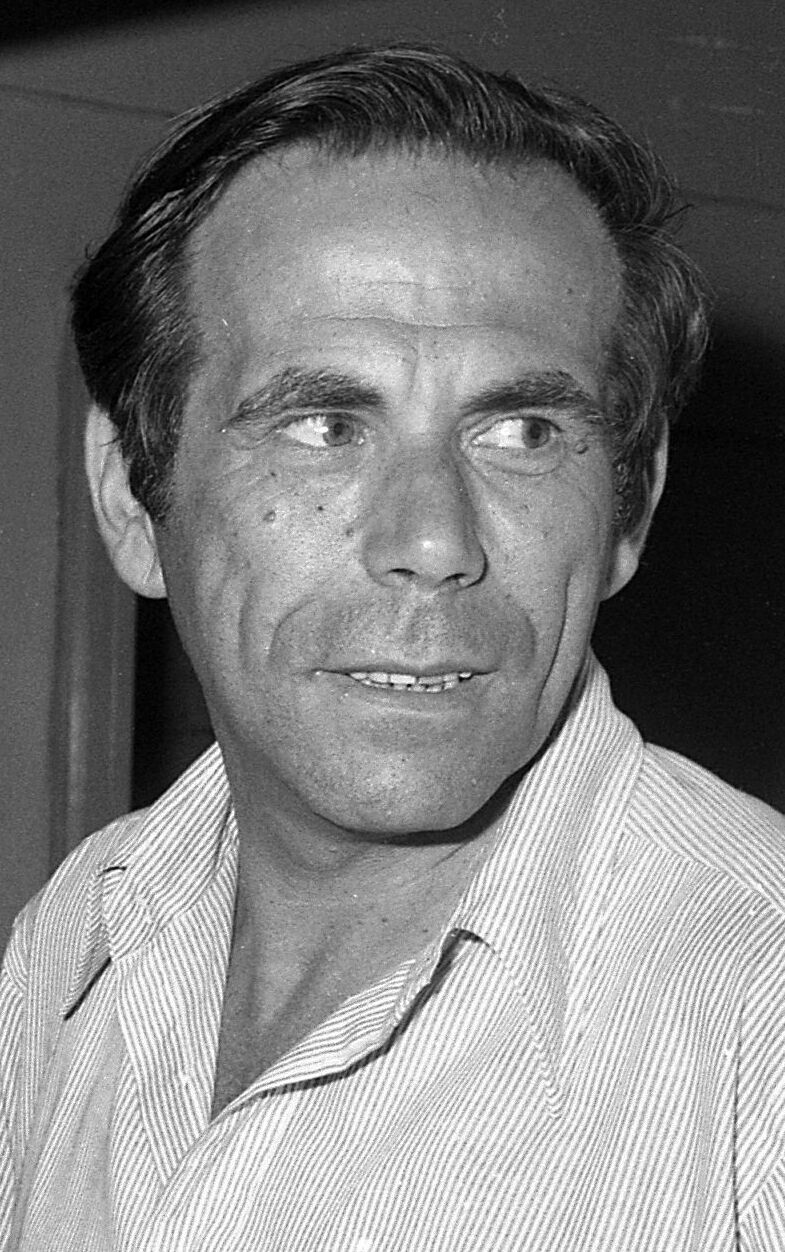
Wertheimer in 1977

In 1952, Wertheimer started his own business in a shack adjacent to his home in Nahariya, a small metal shop and tool-making company called ISCAR. The company quickly became a success and attracted the interest of Discount Investments, who later became a minority investor in the company. Initially it was a supplier to the Israeli defense industry, which was sufficient to provide for his family, but Wertheimer realized that local demand was limited. While Israeli entrepreneurs tended to shy away from foreign markets at the time, Wertheimer recognized that the greatest opportunities were abroad and established relationships with foreign clients. Over time, the company grew from his small workshop into a large multinational manufacturing enterprise. Today, ISCAR is one of the world's largest (by sales) manufacturers of carbide industrial-cutting tools, which are used by carmakers like General Motors and Ford. ISCAR branches exist in dozens of countries worldwide and the company employs over 5,000 people.

In 1968, as part of Israeli efforts to overcome the French weapons embargo after the Six-Day War, Wertheimer founded ISCAR Blades, which later became Blades Technology – one of the largest manufacturers of blades and vanes for jet engines and industrial gas turbines. Wertheimer sold his 51% stake in Blades Technology in 2014 to jet engine maker Pratt & Whitney for an undisclosed amount.

In May 2006, Berkshire Hathaway bought 80% of ISCAR Metalworking Company for $4 billion (the Wertheimers paid $1 billion in taxes to the Israeli government). In May 2013 Buffett bought the rest of Iscar for $2.05 billion.

At the time of his death, Forbes estimated Wertheimer's net worth at US$7.6 billion.

=== Industrial parks ===
Wertheimer founded seven industrial parks – in Tefen, Tel Hai, Dalton, Lavon and now Nazareth in the Galilee; in Omer in the Negev; and another in Gebze, Kocaeli, Turkey. Each is based on five principles: exports, education, coexistence, community and culture, with the goal of fostering economic growth and job creation to help create stability in the region. As Wertheimer has explained, "The idea of industrial parks in the Middle East and on the borders between Israel and its neighbors is that the parks will bring industry and provide jobs, which will keep people busy working, instead of engaging in terrorism."

Wertheimer's model park is the Tefen Industrial Park. Built in 1982, it encompasses everything from transportation to cultural and educational facilities. Wertheimer's industrial park in the mixed Muslim-Christian Arab city of Nazareth, where Jews and Arabs work side by side, opened in April 2013. Wertheimer and Nazareth Mayor Ramez Jeraisy explained that the industrial park is part of a unique model to promote the advancement of Arab-Jewish Israeli export companies. During his visit to Israel in 2009, Pope Benedict had met with both men at the site of the future park and gave his blessing to the project. Wertheimer has said, "Coexistence in the industrial park in Arab Nazareth is a good example of coexistence. When people work together, they have no time for nonsense. They're too tired at night to commit terrorist acts. They're satisfied, they engage in producing. They work together, not against each other."

=== Political career ===
In 1977, Wertheimer was amongst the founding members of the Democratic Movement for Change, a new centrist political party. The party was highly successful, winning 15 seats in the 1977 elections, with Wertheimer taking one of the seats. When the party split up in 1978, he joined Shinui. In 1981, following an accident, he resigned from the Knesset (was replaced by Stella Levy) and returned to his business ventures. During his term in the Knesset, he was a member of the Economics Committee. He remained active in bridging gaps between the Jewish and Arab populations of Israel, particularly by boosting Arab participation in the country's high-tech sector.

Prior to the 2013 elections, he took the honorary final slot on Tzipi Livni's new list, Hatnuah. He endorsed her alliance with Labor, the Zionist Union, in 2015.

== Peace efforts ==
Wertheimer promoted the idea of a "Marshall Plan for the Middle East" – his concept for using industry to provide training, create jobs, alleviate poverty and raise the per capita income of those living in the Middle East.

In the 1990s, he drew up plans for an industrial park in Rafah, in the Gaza Strip. The Palestinian and the Israeli governments both offered support, but one week before the groundbreaking ceremony, the Second Intifada broke out and that plan was indefinitely shelved.

In 2002, he testified before the United States House of Representatives about a "new Marshall Plan" that advocates U.S. funding to revitalize the Middle East through a sustained effort to promote commerce, jobs, and a free economy in the region.

Wertheimer's vision included building an additional 100 industrial parks that will employ Israelis and Palestinians. Wertheimer wasn't confining his idea to Israel though, and had plans underway in Turkey and Jordan. He elaborated, "My Marshall Plan is based on aid from Western countries for strengthening the Middle East, in order to achieve peace and tranquillity. The parks will serve as a five-year incubator for manufacturing and export companies. If aid is obtained, the parks can usher in an era in which production, exports, education, and an advanced quality of life can replace terrorism and poverty."

== Awards and recognition ==
In 1991, Wertheimer was awarded the Israel Prize for his special contribution to society and the State of Israel. In 2006 he was honored as one of the torchbearers in the national Israeli Independence Day ceremony. In 2008, he received the Buber-Rosenzweig-Medal. He received the Oslo Business for Peace Award in 2010, which is given to leaders in the private sector who have demonstrated transformative and positive change through ethical business practices. In 2014, he received the President's Medal.

== Personal life ==
Wertheimer was married with four children and lived in Tel Aviv. His granddaughter is the Israeli actress Maya Wertheimer. In 2018, his son, Eitan Wertheimer, purchased a house for him near Kikar Hamedina in Tel Aviv for 20 million ILS.

On 26 March 2025, Wertheimer died at the age of 98.

== See also ==
- List of Israel Prize recipients
- List of Israelis by net worth
