= Nahariya =

Nahariya: נַהֲרִייָּה
- City (from 1961)

Hebrew transcription(s)
  - ISO 259: Nahariyya
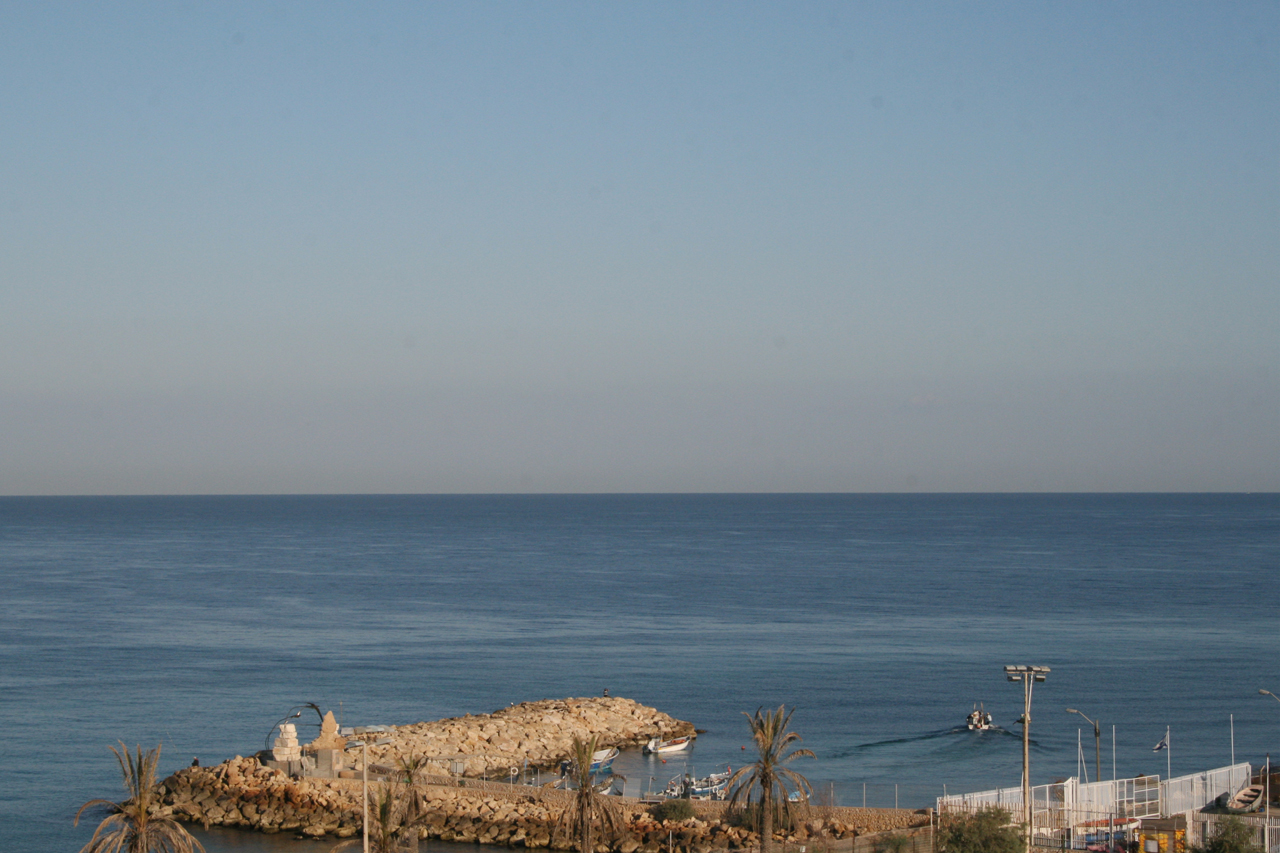
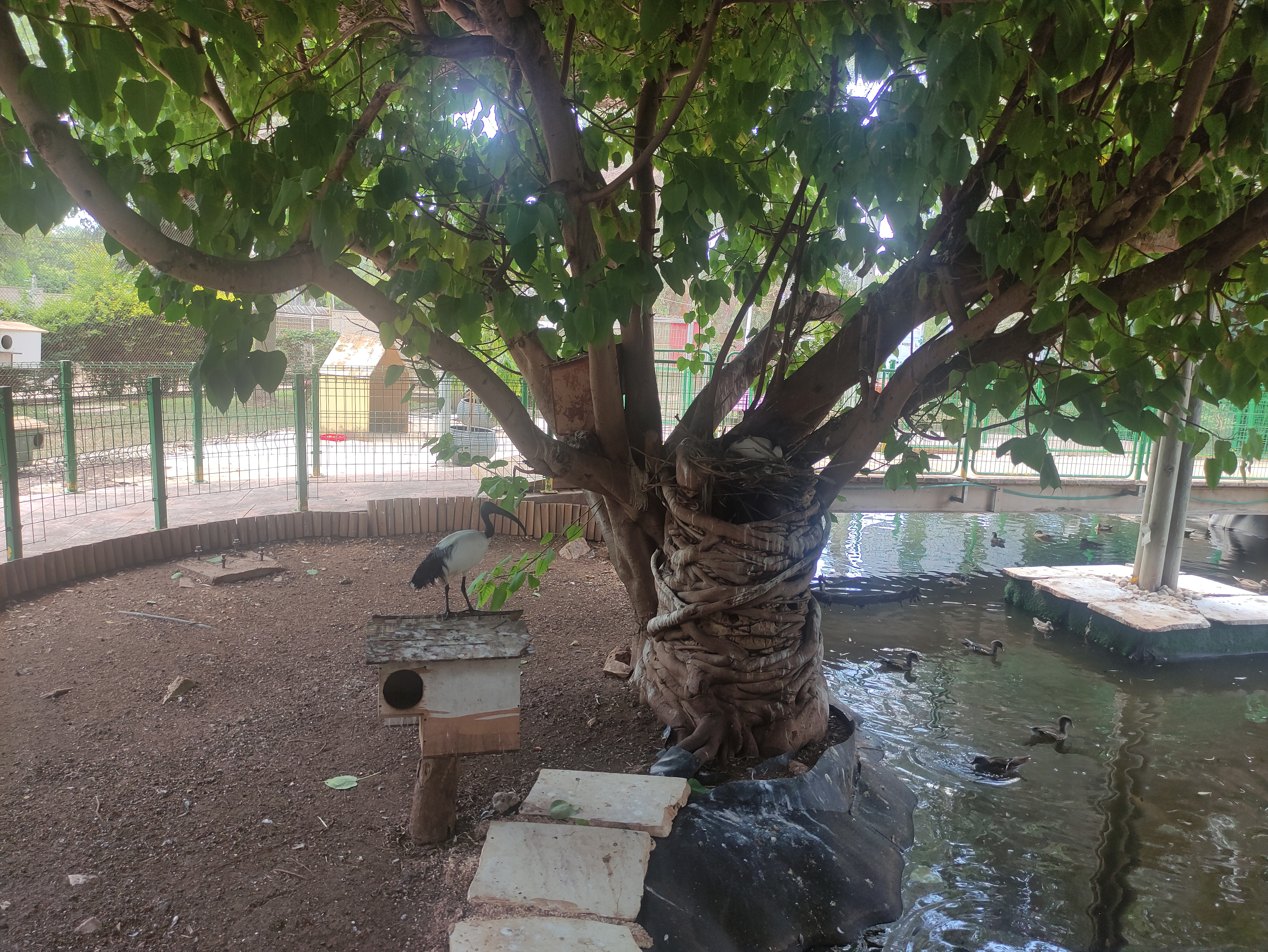
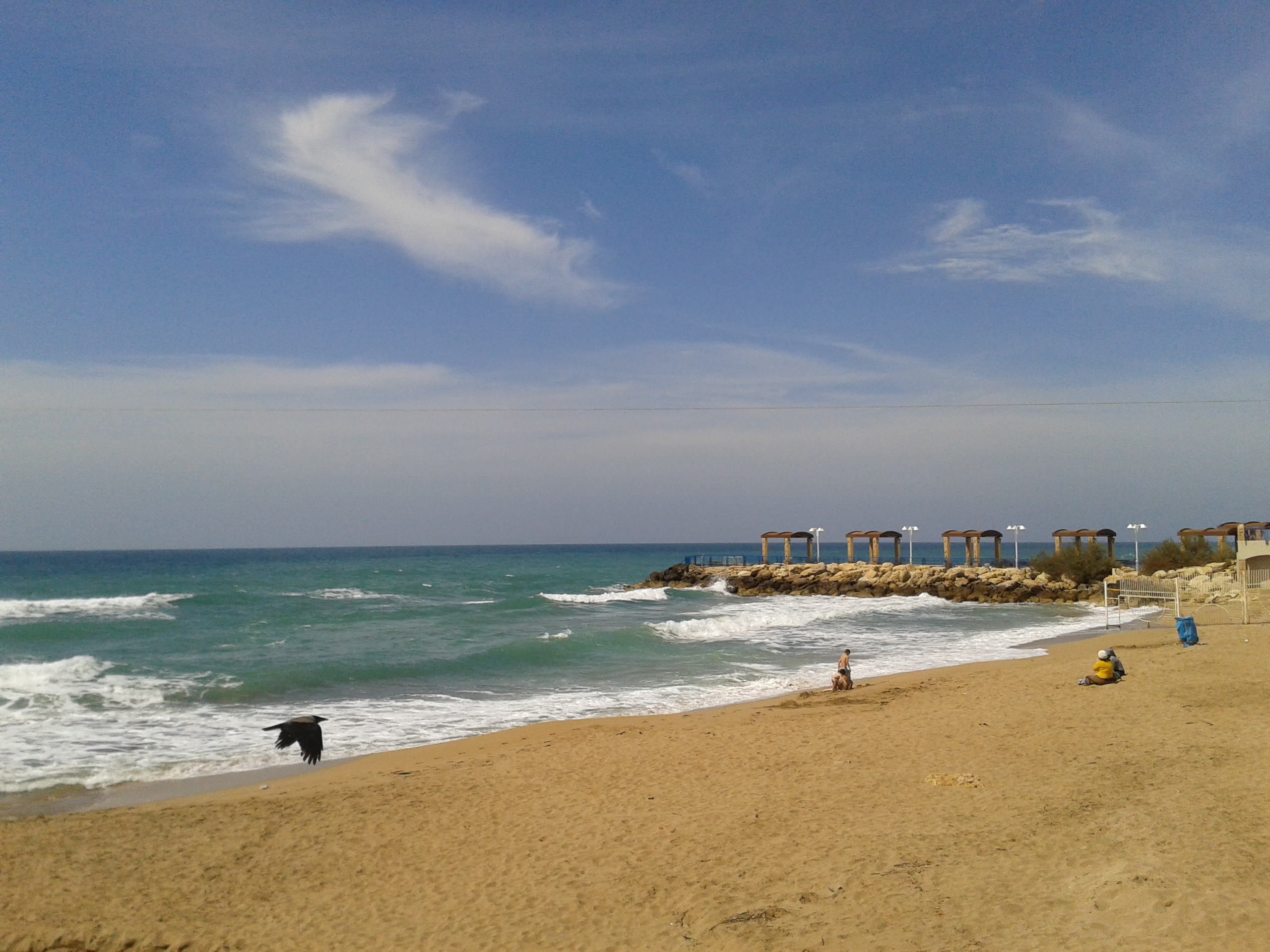
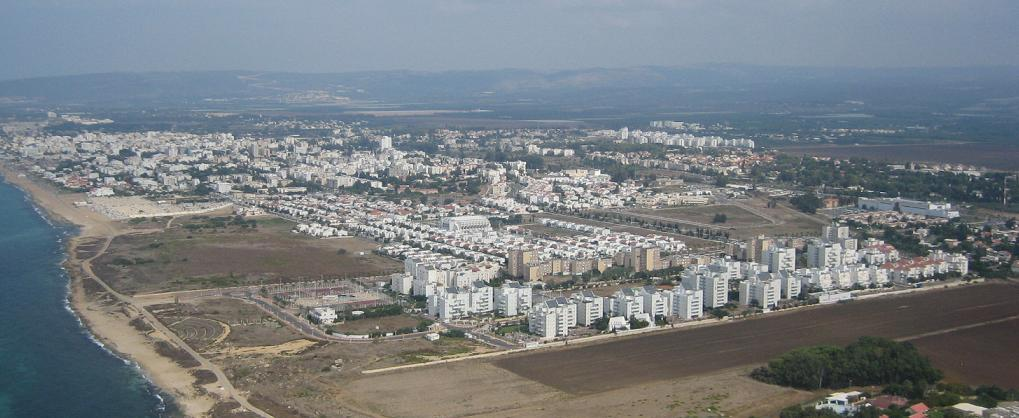

- Location within Northwest Israel Location within Israel
- Coordinates: 33°00′21″N 35°05′56″E
- Country: Israel
- District: Northern
- Subdistrict: Acre
- Natural Region: Nahariya
- Founded: 1400 BCE (Khirbet Kabarsa); 1935 (Modern city)

Government
  - Mayor: Ronen Marelly

Area
  - Total: 10,233 dunams (10.233 km^{2}; 3.951 sq mi)

Population (2024)
  - Total: 67,877
  - Density: 6,633.1/km^{2} (17,180/sq mi)

Ethnicity
  - Jews: 81.2%
  - Arabs: 2.4%
  - Others: 17.3%

Nahariya (Hebrew: נַהֲרִיָּה) is the northernmost coastal city in Israel. In 2024 the city had a population of 67,877.

The city was founded in 1935 by Jewish refugees fleeing Nazi Germany.

== Etymology ==
Nahariya takes its name from the stream of Ga'aton (river is נהר nahar in Hebrew), which bisects it.

== History ==
=== Bronze Age ===
The ruins of a 3,400-year-old Bronze Age citadel were found in the coastal city of Nahariya near the beach on Balfour Street, at a site known to archaeologists as Khirbet Kabarsa. The citadel was an administrative center serving the mariners who sailed along the Mediterranean coast. There is evidence of commercial and cultural relations with Cyprus and the rest of the Mediterranean region. The fortress was destroyed four times by conflagration and rebuilt each time.

=== Byzantine period ===
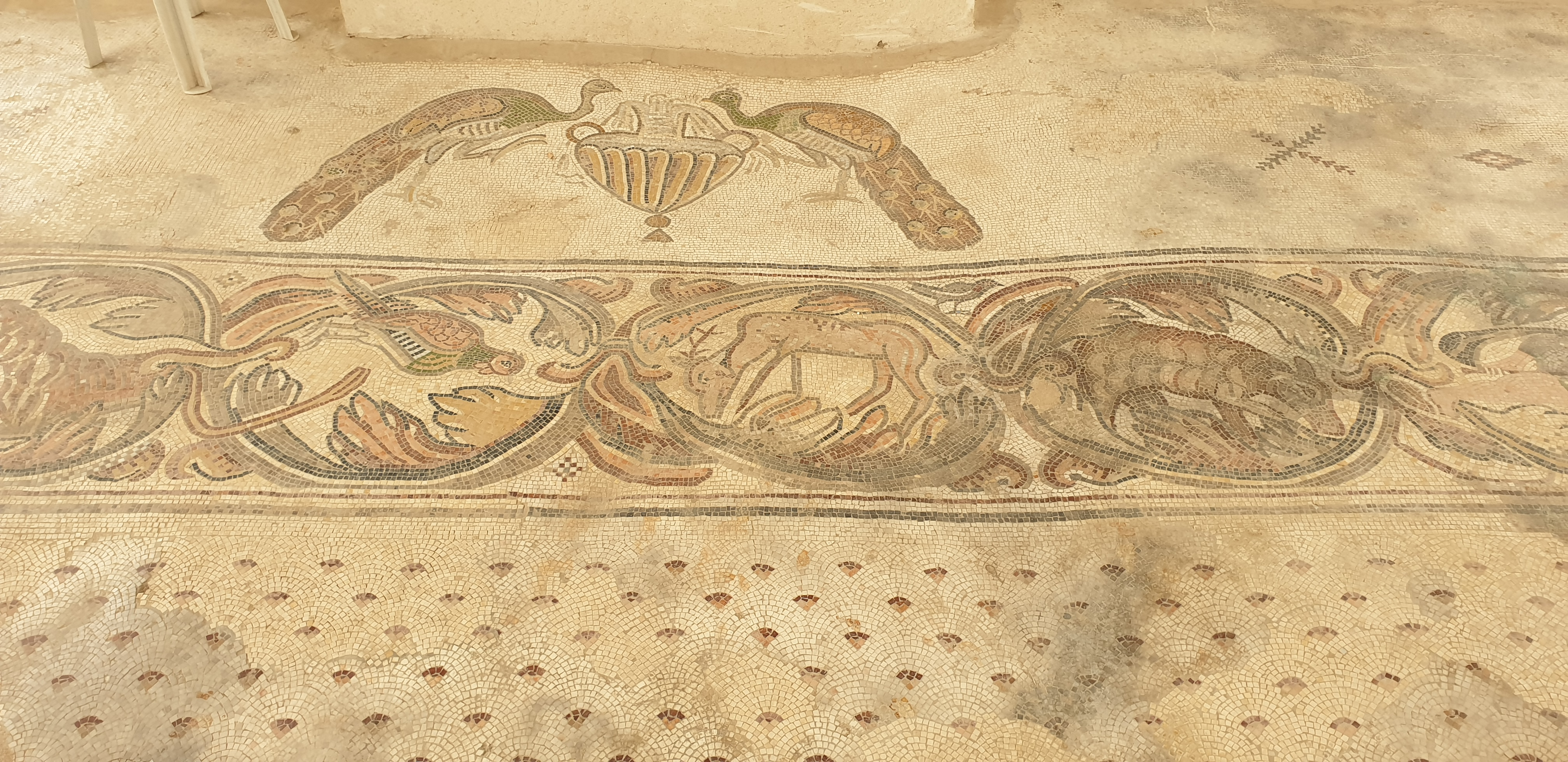
6th century mosaic floor in the church ruins at Nahariya

A church from the Byzantine period, dedicated to St. Lazarus, was excavated in the 1970s. It was destroyed by fire, probably at the time of the Persian invasion in 614.

=== British Mandate of Palestine ===
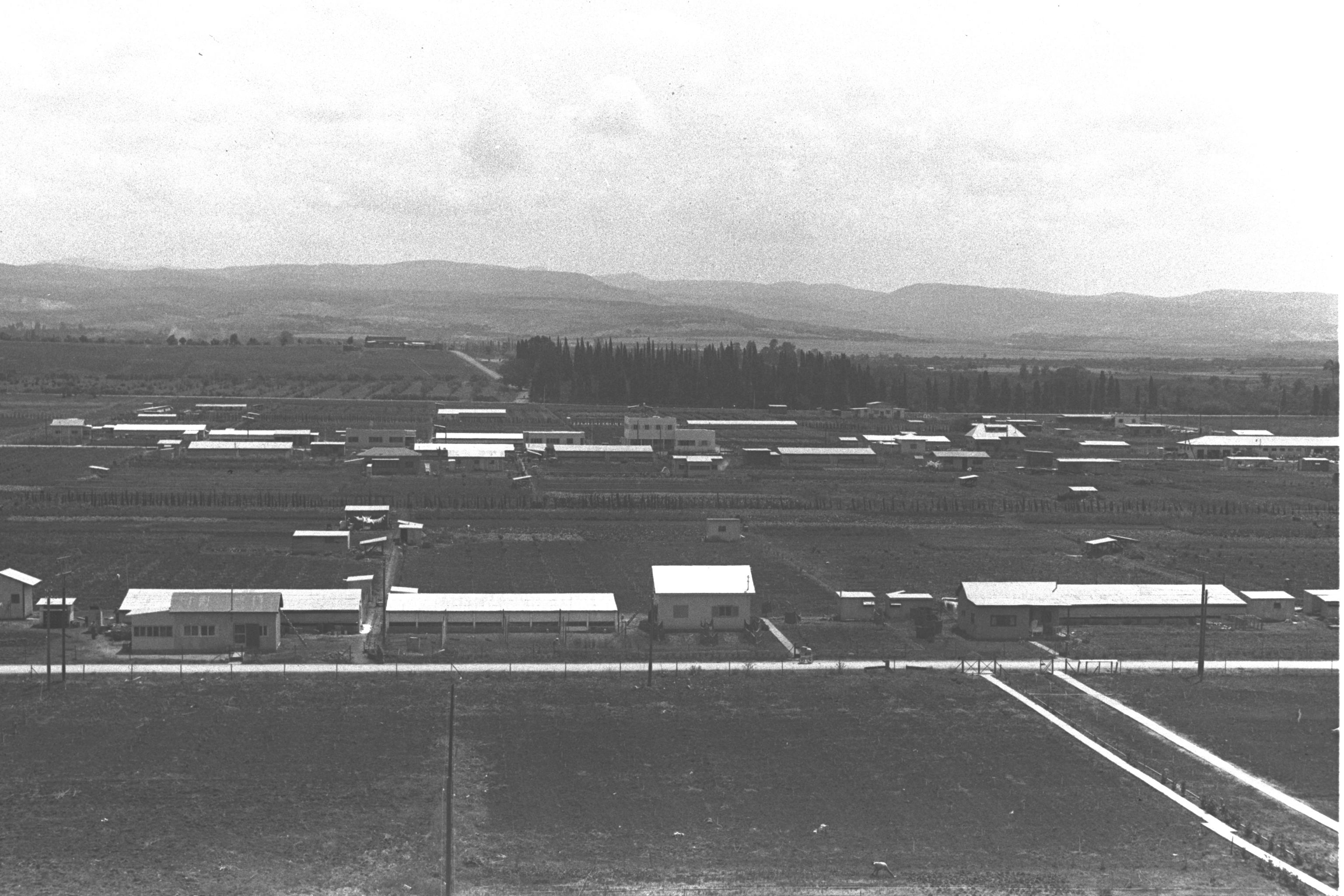
Nahariya in 1937

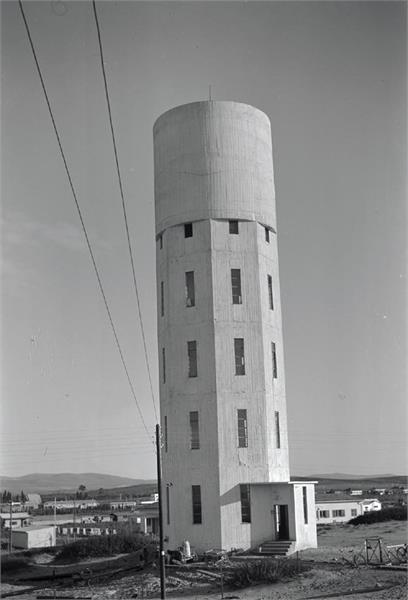
Nahariya water tower 1939

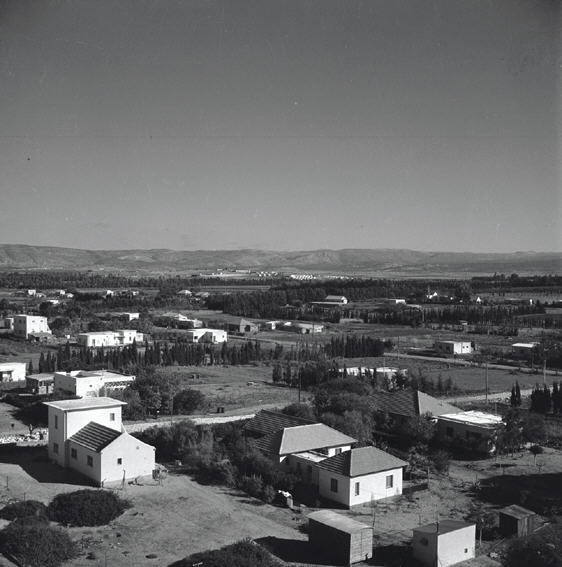
Nahariya in 1945

In 1934, work began to found Nahariya as an agricultural village by a company limited by shares and headed by the agronomist Selig Eugen Soskin (1873–1959), the civil engineer Joseph Loewy (1885–1949), the financial expert Heinrich Cohn (1895–1976) and the engineer Simon Reich (1883–1941). The company acquired an area of land by purchase from the Arab landowner family Toueini. After land improvement and parcelling, the plots were offered to new German Jewish immigrants who had escaped from Nazi persecution. The first residents, two German immigrant couples, permanently settled in Nahariya on February 10, 1935, which is now considered the official founding date of Nahariya. During the same year each couple had one child, the first children born in Nahariya. By the end of 1935 approximately 40 pioneers had settled in Nahariya. Settlement continued in 1936 and four more children were born there that year. While the first settlers lived in huts, the settlement was rapidly developed as houses were built and trees and gardens planted. The residents also took to raising chickens.

After an accumulation of economic and climatic problems the residents soon realized that agriculture was impractical and chose to focus on tourism and the food industry. Nahariya was turned into a European-style resort town, taking advantage of the natural surroundings and beaches, and new inns were opened. Two prominent food manufacturers also set up shop: the Strauss company was founded as a commercial dairy by German immigrants in Nahariya, and the Soglowek family, which settled in Nahariya in 1937, opened a prominent butcher shop, and developed the "Nahariya sausage". During the British Mandate of Palestine, many British officers coming from Khartoum stopped in Nahariya.

=== State of Israel ===
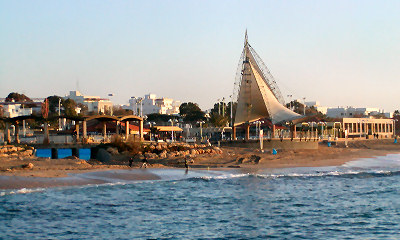
Nahariya beach

In 1948 when Israel was founded Nahariya had a population of 1,700. It became a development town in the 1950s after a ma'abara established nearby was integrated. The town hence became a home to many Jewish refugees from North Africa, the Middle East and Europe. It had a population of 9,800 in 1955, which had increased to 23,800 in 1972. During the 1990s, the city absorbed a significant number of immigrants from the former Soviet Union and Ethiopia. In the late 1990s and early 2000s, Nahariya experienced a construction boom.

==== Israeli–Arab conflict ====
Due to its geographic location, 9.6 km (6.0 mi) down the coast from Israel's border with Lebanon, Nahariya had been a frequent target of cross-border terrorist attacks by Palestinian militants, mortar attacks and Katyusha rocket fire during the 1970s. The most notable of those were the 1974 attack and the 1979 Nahariya attack.

During the 2006 Lebanon War in July–August 2006, Nahariya sustained a barrage of several hundreds of Katyusha rockets launched by Hezbollah from southern Lebanon. As a result, the city suffered multiple civilian casualties and 5 fatalities. Significant damage was also inflicted on property and physical infrastructure. Nahariya's economy suffered a major blow, as two-thirds of the city's population had to evacuate, with the rest spending weeks in bomb shelters.

During the Gaza war and the Israel–Lebanon border conflict during the war, there were many siren alerts throughout the city, due to bombardments and drone infiltrations, mainly from Hezbollah.

== Economy ==
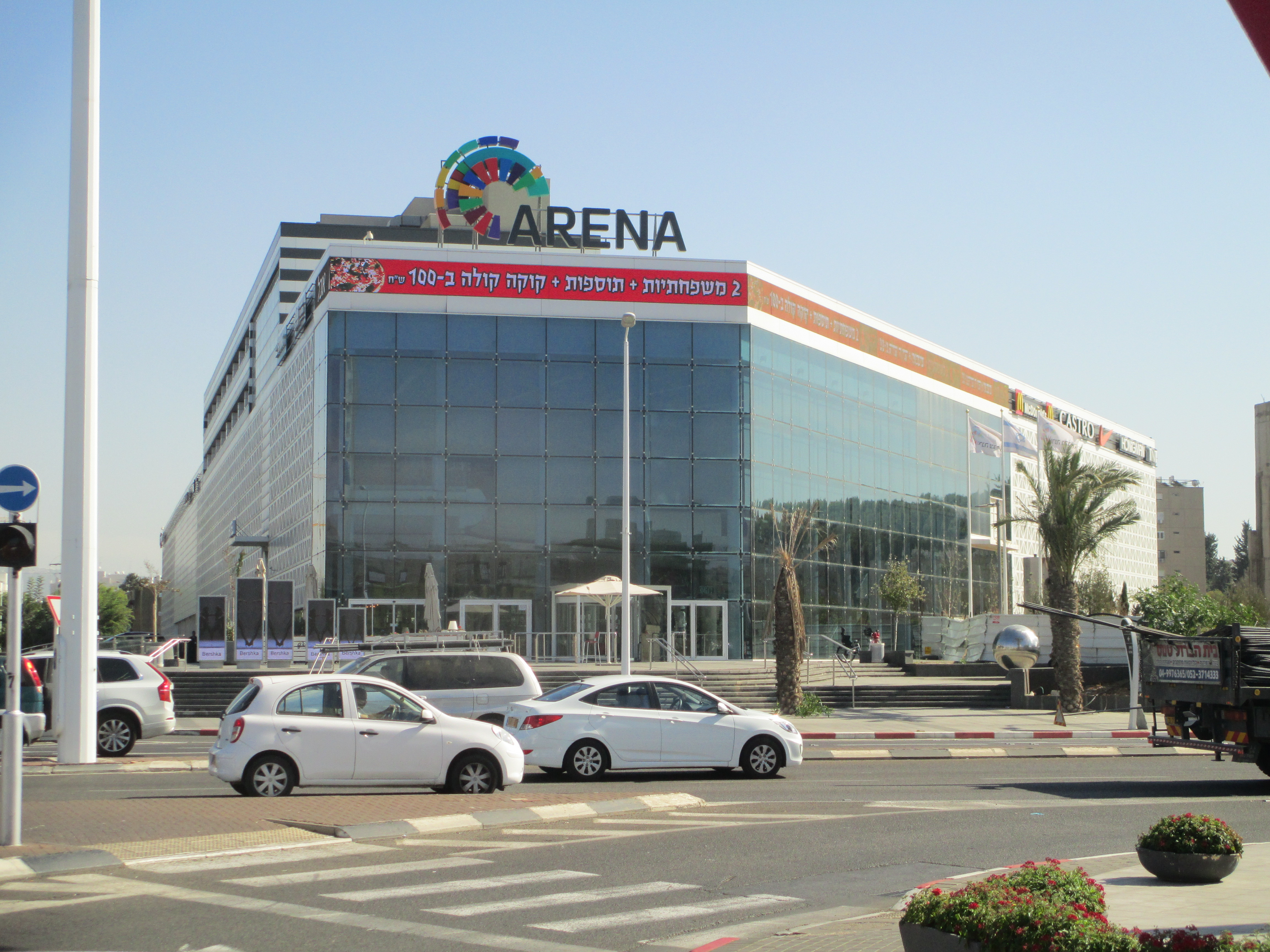
Arena Mall

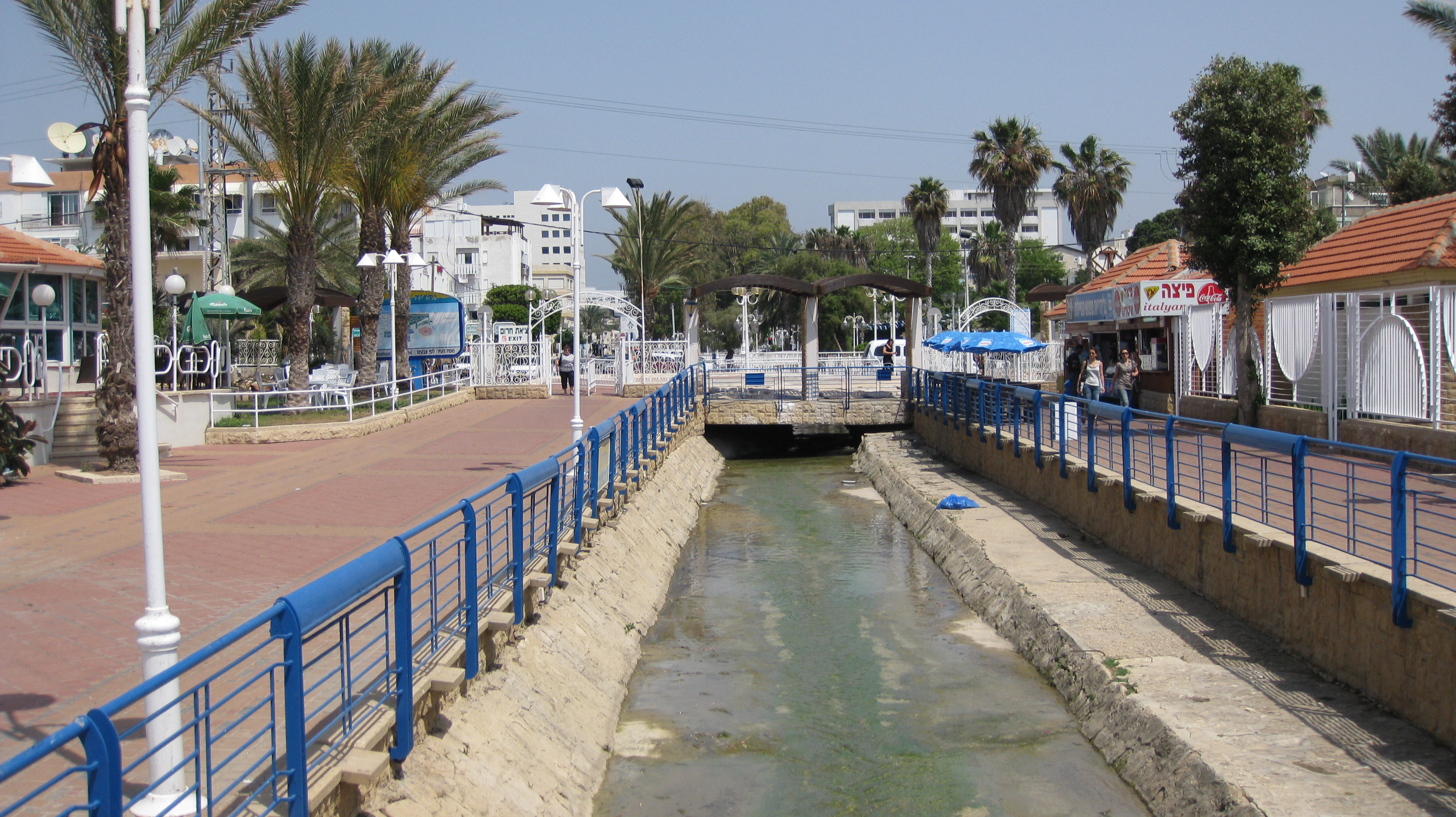
Ga'aton boulevard

Nahariya is home to some of Israel's leading entrepreneurs: the Strauss, Soglowek and Wertheimer families. Successful private sector industrial enterprises founded in Nahariya are the Strauss dairy company, Soglowek meat processing company, and Iscar—the high-precision metalworks and tool-making giant, which was purchased by Berkshire Hathaway for US$5 billion.

According to the CBS, as of 2000 there were 17,916 salaried workers in the city and 1,283 were self-employed. The mean monthly wage in 2000 for a salaried worker in the city was ILS 5,736, a real growth of 7.0% over the previous year. Salaried men have a mean monthly wage of ILS 7,353 (an increase of 7.6%) versus ILS 3,950 for women (increase of 2.5%). The mean income for the self-employed was ILS 9,078. In the same year, there were 886 people who received unemployment benefits and 3,611 people living on fixed income (social security).

== Tourism ==
Sderot Ga'aton, the city's main boulevard, runs east–west from the Coastal Highway junction to the sea, and is divided down the middle by the Ga'aton River. Shaded by the thick greenery of towering eucalyptus trees and lined with numerous shops, boutiques, open-air cafes, restaurants and ice cream parlors, Sderot Ga'aton is Nahariya's main tourist attraction and its central business and entertainment district. The beach area has a public park, a waterfront promenade, two public beaches, several hotels, a small marina and a lively nightlife in the multitude of beachfront cafes, bars, restaurants and nightclubs.

== Transportation ==
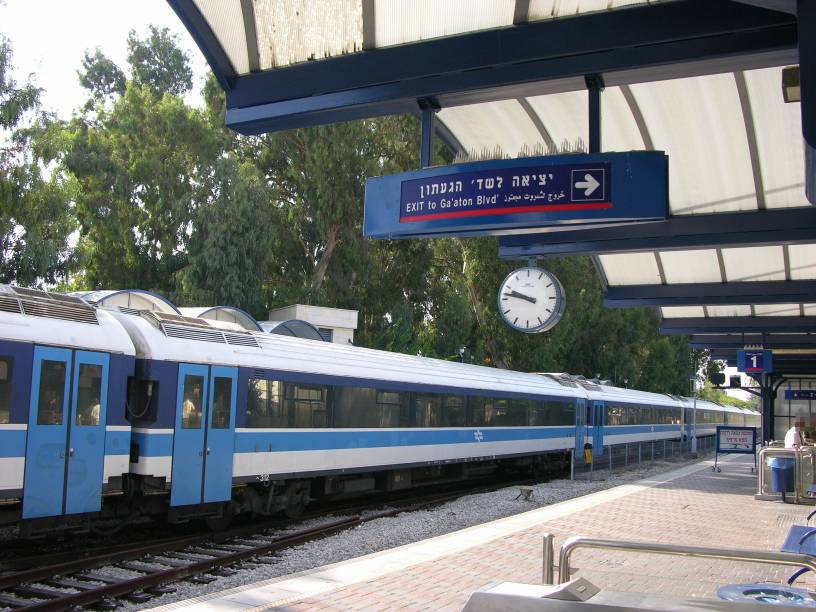
Nahariya railway station

Highway 4, the coastal highway, is the main north–south road in the city. Highway 89 starts at the Nahariya Junction in the city, and connects it with the rest of the Upper Galilee and Safed. Nahariya's public transportation hub is located at the eastern end of Sderot Ga'aton, near the intersection with Highway 4, and contains the city's train station and central bus station. Nahariya's train station is the northernmost station of the Israel Railways network. Sderot Ga'aton runs westward where the mouth of the Ga'aton River spills into the Mediterranean Sea.

== Demographics ==
Historical population
Year	Pop.	±%
1972	24,200	—
1983	28,000	+15.7%
1995	36,800	+31.4%
2008	51,300	+39.4%
2022	63,318	+23.4%
2024	67,877	+7.2%

According to Israel Central Bureau of Statistics (CBS), in 2001 the ethnic makeup of the city was 97.3% Jewish and other non-Arabs, without significant Arab population. In 2001, there were 355 immigrants. See population groups in Israel. According to the CBS, in 2001 there were 22,200 males and 23,700 females. The population of the city was spread out, with 29.5% 19 years of age or younger, 16.3% between 20 and 29, 18.8% between 30 and 44, 17.3% from 45 to 59, 4.1% from 60 to 64, and 13.9% 65 years of age or older. The population growth rate in 2001 was 4.2%. In 2022, 83.1% of the population was Jewish and 16.9% was counted as other.

Following Israel's withdrawal from Lebanon in 2000 many ex South Lebanon Army soldiers and officers who fled from Lebanon settled in Nahariya with their families.

== Schools and public institutions ==
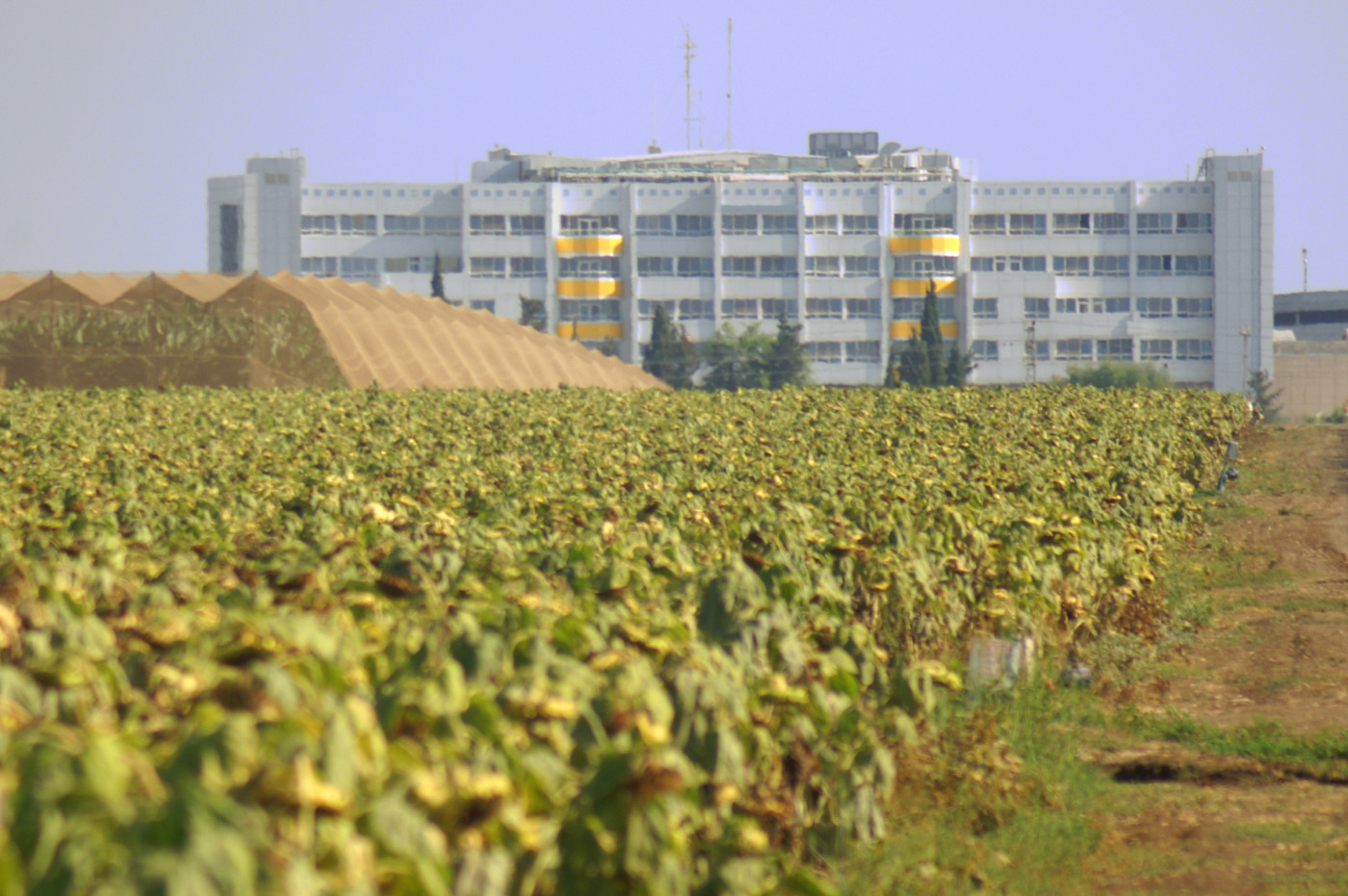
Nahariya hospital

According to the CBS, Nahariya has 22 schools with 7,541 students, which are divided into 15 elementary schools with 4,074 students, and 7 middle and high schools with 3,467 students. In 2001, high school (12th grade) matriculation rate in the city was 56.5%.

Nahariya Hospital, located on the outskirts of Nahariya, three kilometers (1.9 miles) from the city center, serves half a million residents of the western Galilee, from Karmiel to the coast. During the 2006 Lebanon War, the hospital was hit by rocket fire that destroyed an outer wall and eight rooms.

== Voting patterns ==
In the 2022 election, 57 percent of voters in Nahariya voted for the parties of the right-wing coalition led by Benjamin Netanyahu, while 40 percent voted for the parties of the center-left coalition led by Yair Lapid and 0.5 percent voted for the Arab parties.

In the 2026 election, 52 percent of voters in Nahariya voted for the parties of the right-wing coalition led by Benjamin Netanyahu, while 41 percent voted for the parties of the center-left coalition led by Gadi Eisenkot and 0.8 percent voted for the Arab parties. An additional 3.3 percent voted for the Reservists, and 2.2 percent voted for Amcha Yisrael. Voter turnout increased 24 percent from the 2022 election.

== Notable people ==
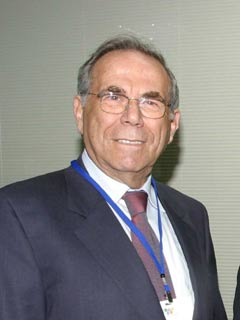
Stef Wertheimer

- Gai Assulin (born 1991), football player
- Dalia Dorner (born 1934), former Justice of the Supreme Court of Israel
- Gilad Shalit (born 1986), former Israel Defense Forces soldier held captive by Hamas (2006–2011) and sports columnist
- Yael Shelbia (born 2001), social media model
- Selig Soskin (1873–1959), agronomist and early member of the Zionist movement
- Ofra Strauss (born 1960), business magnate and industrialist
- Joaquin Szuchman (born 1995), Israeli-Argentinian basketball player in the Israel Basketball Premier League
- Viktor Tsyhankov (born 1997), Ukrainian professional footballer
- Stef Wertheimer (1926–2025), German-born Israeli entrepreneur, industrialist, and politician

== Twin towns – sister cities ==
Nahariya is twinned with:

- Bielefeld, Germany
- Issy-les-Moulineaux, France
- Kecskemét, Hungary
- Lefkada, Greece
- Liberec, Czech Republic
- Miami Beach, United States
- Tempelhof-Schöneberg (Berlin), Germany
