= KTC Technology =

Chinese electronic display company

Shenzhen KTC Technology Co., Ltd. (Chinese: 深圳市康冠科技股份有限公司), commonly known as KTC, is a Chinese electronics manufacturer specializing in flat-panel display technology, headquartered in Longgang District, Shenzhen, China. Founded in 1995, the company is publicly listed on the Shenzhen Stock Exchange (stock code: 001308) since March 18, 2022.

== History ==
KTC Technology was established in 1995 in Shenzhen, China, focused on flat-panel display manufacturing. The company expanded into consumer gaming monitors and portable displays under its KTC brand, while operating as an OEM/ODM manufacturer for international clients.

On March 18, 2022, the company completed its initial public offering on the Shenzhen Stock Exchange Main Board at an issue price of CN¥48.84 per share.

== Operations ==
KTC Technology operates manufacturing facilities in Shenzhen and Huizhou. The company holds over 800 patents, utility models, design patents, and industry standards, and employs more than 1,000 research and development engineers.

== Products ==
KTC Technology produces display products under two primary brands:

- KTC – consumer gaming monitors and displays, sold internationally through ktcplay.com
- Horion (皓丽) – smart interactive flat panels for enterprise and education markets

The company's product range includes gaming monitors, Mini-LED displays, portable monitors, and 4K/8K display solutions.

KTC's gaming monitor lineup has been reviewed by major technology publications. The M27P6 Mini-LED gaming monitor received coverage from IGN, PC Magazine, and PC Gamer.

The H27P3, a 27-inch 5K monitor, was covered by Forbes upon its launch, and subsequently reviewed by TechRadar and The Verge.

The A25Q5, a portable monitor with a built-in battery, was reviewed by TechRadar, ZDNet, and Ars Technica.

KTC monitors have been included in best-of lists by Wirecutter, IGN, and Windows Central.

== Market position ==
According to TRENDFORCE, KTC held approximately 17% of the global Mini-LED monitor market in the first half of 2022, ranking second worldwide in that segment. In 2022, the company ranked sixth globally in television OEM shipment volume, and first globally among production-type suppliers in smart interactive displays, according to DISCIEN.
