= International Metalworking Companies =

Precision tools conglomerate headquartered in Israel

IMC Group
- Company type: Subsidiary
- Industry: Manufacturing
- Founder: Stef Wertheimer
- Headquarters: Galilee, Israel
- Key people: Jacob Harpaz (chairman and president)
- Number of employees: 14,000+
- Parent: Berkshire Hathaway

IMC International Metalworking Companies B.V., otherwise known as IMC Group, is the holding company of several worldwide manufacturers of metal cutting tools. Together they produce a wide range of carbide inserts, carbide endmills and cutting tools covering all metal cutting applications. The IMC Group is in the automotive, aerospace, die and mold, general engineering, bearing manufacturing and energy industries.

== Subsidiaries ==
Today, the IMC Group has over 130 subsidiaries in 65 countries.

Primary Subsidiaries:

- ISCAR
- TaeguTec
- Tungaloy
- Ingersoll Cutting Tools
