= ISCAR Metalworking =

Israeli manufacturing company

ISCAR Ltd.
- Type: Subsidiary
- Industry: Industrial manufacturing
- Founded: 1952; 74 years ago
- Founders: Stef Wertheimer; Eitan Wertheimer
- Headquarters: Migdal Tefen, Israel
- Area served: Worldwide
- Key people: Jacob Harpaz (Chairman of the Board); Ilan Geri (CEO)
- Owner: IMC Group
- Number of employees: 7000
- Website: http://www.iscar.com/

ISCAR Ltd. is an Israeli manufacturer of metal cutting tools and a subsidiary of the IMC Group (International Metalworking Companies).

== Operations ==
ISCAR Ltd. is headquartered in Migdal Tefen, Israel, and operates internationally. The company is led by CEO Ilan Geri and IMC Group Chairman Jacob Harpaz.

The company supplies metal cutting tools to industries including aerospace, automotive, energy, medical, and general engineering. The company also develops tool geometries, clamping systems, and digital technologies for industrial manufacturing applications.

A major milestone occurred in 2006 when Berkshire Hathaway, led by Warren Buffett, becoming one of its largest non-insurance companies.

== History ==
ISCAR was founded in 1952 by metalworker Stef Wertheimer in Nahariya, Israel. The company began as a family business and developed into a tool manufacturer.

During the 1970s and 1980s, ISCAR expanded its catalog of indexable tooling, including inserts and tools for turning, milling, and grooving, along with additional carbide grades and coatings.

In 1982, the company relocated its operations to Migdal Tefen (Tefen industrial zone) in the Upper Galilee. During the 1980s, under the leadership of Stef’s son, Eitan Wertheimer, ISCAR expanded operations into Europe, Asia, and the Americas.

In the 1990s, ISCAR expanded its international operations and developed modular tooling systems for machining applications. Its products have been adopted by manufacturers in sectors including automotive and aerospace.

In 2006, Berkshire Hathaway acquired an 80% stake in ISCAR (through the International Metalworking Companies (IMC) group). Berkshire Hathaway acquired the remaining shares in 2013, making ISCAR fully owned by Berkshire Hathaway.

2010s–present, ISCAR manufactures metal-cutting tools for machining operations including turning, milling, holemaking, threading, and parting and grooving.

ISCAR is part of the International Metalworking Companies (IMC) Group—a network of over 150 subsidiaries in more than 60 countries.

== See also ==
- Economy of Israel
- Science and technology in Israel
