= Sabra =

Sabra may refer to:

== Arts and entertainment ==
- Sabra (character), a fictional Israeli female superhero in the Marvel Comics universe
- Sabra (magazine), a Japanese magazine for men

== Businesses ==
- Sabra (company), a company specializing in hummus and Mediterranean-style dips
- Gamda Koor Sabra, or simply Sabra, an Israeli toy company
- Sabra liqueur, a collection of Israeli liqueurs made by the Carmel Winery
- Sabra, the brand name that Sussita used for their exports

== Places ==
- Sabra, Algeria, a town and commune in Tlemcen Province
- Sabra, Burkina Faso
- Säbrå, Härnösand Municipality, Sweden
- Sabra, Gaza, a neighborhood in Gaza in the Palestinian territories
- Sabra District, a district of Tlemcen Province in north-western Algeria
- Sabra (Lebanon), a Shia neighborhood of Beirut adjacent to the Shatila refugee camp

== Other uses ==
- Sabra (moth), a moth genus
- Sabra, the Hebrew name for Opuntia, the "prickly pear"
- Sabra (given name), a given name and a list of people bearing the name
- Sabra (surname)
- Sabra (person), a Jew born in Israel
- Sabra (tank), an Israeli Military Industries-upgraded M60 Patton tank
- Sabra Sport, an Israeli sports car manufactured in the 1960s
- South African Bureau for Racial Affairs (SABRA)
- Sabra (textile) silk, or cactus silk, a type of fiber.

== See also ==
- Sabre (disambiguation)
