= Arabesque Festival =

Annual international cultural event held in Acre

- Genre: Arabic music and Andalusian music
- Locations: Acre, Israel
- Years active: 2018–present
- Founders: Michael Strauss; Shimon Lankri; Tom Cohen; Albert Ben-Shlush; Maor Ben-Zino

The Arabesque Festival (full name: the Acre International Festival of Classical Arabic and Andalusian Music) is an annual music festival held in the city of Acre. The festival is dedicated to classical Arabic and Andalusian music, and is a cultural event that seeks to connect musicians, communities, and cultures through music from their common origins.

The festival is considered the largest cultural event produced by the Acre Municipality, and one of eight festivals held in the city (alongside the Acco Festival of Alternative Israeli Theatre, the Opera Festival, the International Choir, and more).

== Background and Founding ==
The festival was founded on the initiative of Dr. Michael Strauss, who worked together with former Acre Mayor Shimon Lankri. The festival's goal was to create a cultural bridge between Jews and Arabs and between East and West, recognizing the shared musical heritage of the city's residents and the country.

Those who led the process and played a central role in establishing the festival were Albert Ben Shleus(the late head of the city's cultural directorate and former director of the Acre Festival), and Maor Ben Zino (director of the cultural department and the Cultural Hall), who were joined by conductor Tom Cohen.

In the past, the event was called the "Mediterranean Basin Festival". Its current name, "Arabesque", is derived from the term arabesque, which represents a decorative and artistic style associated with Arab culture.

== History and location ==
In its early years, the festival was held in the Old City of Acre. Following Operation Guardian of the Walls in 2021, it was decided to relocate the main activities to the city's new cultural center which had just been inaugurated and the festival was held there thereafter. In 2026, the festival returned to its original location in the Old City.

== Structure and content ==
The festival lasts for about five days during the month of August and includes two centers of activity:

Music performances: concerts of classical Arabic and Andalusian music with the participation of prominent artists.

Shabbat Piyut: On the weekend of the festival, poets are hosted in the many synagogues throughout the city.

Among the artists who have performed at the festival over the years: Siraj Band, Valerie Hamaty, Moshe Luke, Ziv Yehezkel, Nasrin Kadri, Zehava Ben, Sarit Hadad, Ishtar, Mojda and Linet.

== Management and budget ==
The festival is produced by the Acre Municipality through the Culture Department and the Cultural Center. Over the years, Albert Ben-Shloushe served as the festival's CEO, and after his death Maor Ben-Zino was appointed CEO, The festival's artistic director is Maestro Tom Cohen.

The festival's budget is approximately NIS 1 million, funded by the Ministry of Culture and Sports, the Acre Municipality, and revenue from ticket sales.
