= Ofra Strauss =

Israeli German business magnate and industrialist

- עפרה שטראוס
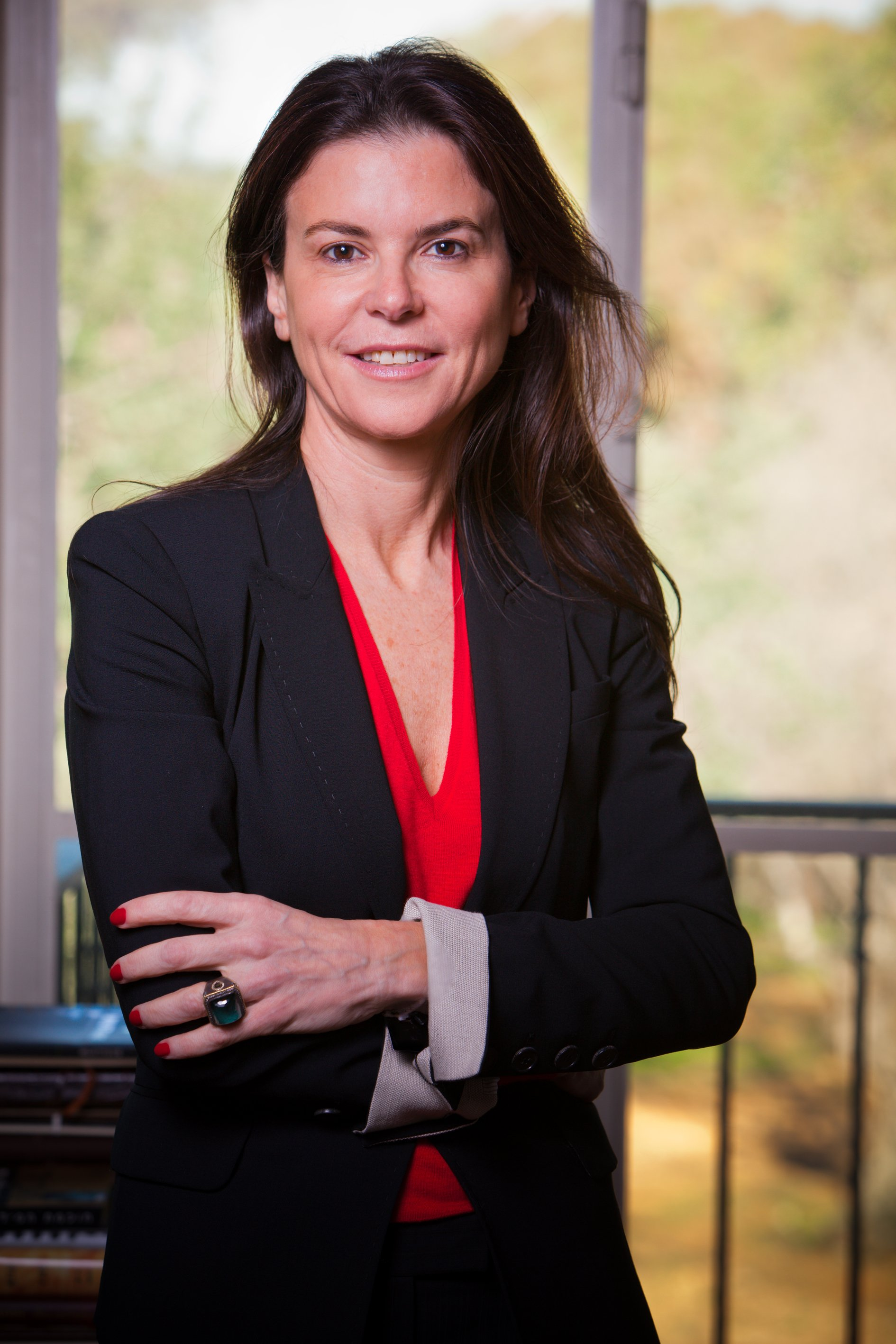
- Born: 22 August 1960 (age 66); Nahariya, Israel
- Occupation: Chairperson of Strauss Group
- Years active: 2001–present
- Spouses: Dan Lahat (m. 1987; div. 2001) Adi Keizman (m. 2005; div. 2010)
- Children: 4
- Parent: Michael Strauss

Ofra Yasmin Strauss (Hebrew: עפרה יסמין שטראוס; born 22 August 1960) is an Israeli business magnate and industrialist. She is the Chairperson of Israeli food corporation Strauss Group which is traded on the Tel Aviv Stock Exchange, and the second largest consumer food manufacturer in Israel. She was appointed to the position of chairperson in 2001, after being groomed for the job, following the retirement of her late father Michael Strauss who had continued involvement in the firm in various capacities following his formal retirement and until his death in 2020.

== Early life ==
Strauss was born in Nahariya, Israel. The eldest of three children of Ella (born 1935 in Yugoslavia, died in 1985), a nurse and holocaust survivor, and Michael, chairperson of Strauss Group, the son of the founders Hilda and Dr. Richard Strauss. Her parents divorced in 1981.

Strauss has a younger sister Irit (former advertiser and current business partner of brother) and a younger brother Adi, a businessman.

Strauss grew up in the family business. Her father Michael said in an interview that as an 11-year-old girl, she would join his night delivery route, during which she used to help carrying 20-kg containers of dairy products, listen to his business talks and follow carefully how many cartons were delivered and registered. She filled a number of roles in the company through the years.

She graduated in 1987 from Tel Aviv University Law School. As a student, she met Dan Lahat, the son of then Tel Aviv mayor Shlomo Lahat and married him. They later divorced in 2001.

== Business career ==
During 1987–1989, she worked in the marketing department of the Estée Lauder Companies Inc. in New York City, the American cosmetics line. During this time, she led a marketing campaign for the company in Japan.

In 1989, upon Strauss' return to Israel, she filled a number of roles in the family business and was groomed to succeed her father Michael as chairperson. She was appointed Marketing director of the ice cream division and then head of the food division in the corporation. In 1993 Strauss was nominated director general of the Strauss salads company. During this time the Strauss company grew, led by her father, via a series of major acquisitions in the Israeli food business most notably Elite in 1996, following which she was appointed as CEO of Elite. In 2001, following the formal retirement of her father, she was appointed chairperson.

From 2002 to 2004, Strauss managed the integration and merger of Elite into the Strauss group, following the Elite acquisition in 1996 which left Elite as a separate company with common controlling ownership. In 2007–2008 Elite was dropped from the company title (which was Strauss-Elite) and company-wide branding, remaining a chocolate and coffee brand.

Strauss has developed strategic partnerships with Danone, PepsiCo, Haier, São Miguel and Virgin, for the sale of dairy, coffee, water, dips and spreads. The partnership with PepsiCo also created the US-based Sabra Dipping Company, since 2009 the largest hummus manufacturer worldwide.

Since 2011, Strauss has been Chair of the Israel-America Chamber of Commerce. Strauss' field of food technology is a significant issue in the Chamber's work.

== Philanthropic activities ==
- Strauss is President of the Israeli NGO Jasmine, promoting Jewish and Arab Israeli women's entrepreneurship. The 2016 Israeli Knesset Parliament Speakers` Quality of Life Prize was awarded to Jasmine for its work on promoting a respectful and tolerant society.
- In 2008 Strauss launched,(with the Israel's Women Network) the Israeli Catalyst census of women in corporate/public company boards– taking after the global Catalyst organization.
- She is a member of the ICWBL International Council on Women's Business Leadership.
- Former chair of WIZO (Women's International Zionist Organization) fundraising.
- She founded a scholarship program named after Hilda Strauss, her grandmother and co-founder of the family business.
- Strauss is a board member of HESEG, the Israeli Foundation for Former Lone Soldiers who came from the diaspora with their families and now live and work in Israel.
- She is a board member of the Taub Center for social policy studies in Israel research of social policy in Israel.
- During the 2000s Strauss was chair of the public council of the "Together at Home" project for integration and absorption of newcomer Ethiopian Jews in Israel with the Jewish Agency, as well as being the public chair of the Amez Lohem project
- She was Chair of the Israeli MAALA CSR and Corporate Governance Forum

== Awards and recognition ==
- Laureate of the Israeli Industry Prize of the Manufacturers' Association of Israel, food category in 2000
- In 2005, Fortune Magazine listed Strauss 42nd in its list of "Fortune Most Powerful Women Entrepreneurs". She appeared on the bottom of the "Fortune Global Power 50" between 2003 and 2008.
- In 2009–2010, the Financial Times ranked her 12th and 16th in the list of 50 leading women in the business world.

== Personal life ==
Strauss is a mother of four: Michaela, a photographer; Tom, co-founder of design start-up Tailor Brands; and Jasmine are her three children from her first marriage to Dan Lahat. Daniel is her daughter from her second marriage to Adi Keizman.
