= Sabra (given name) =

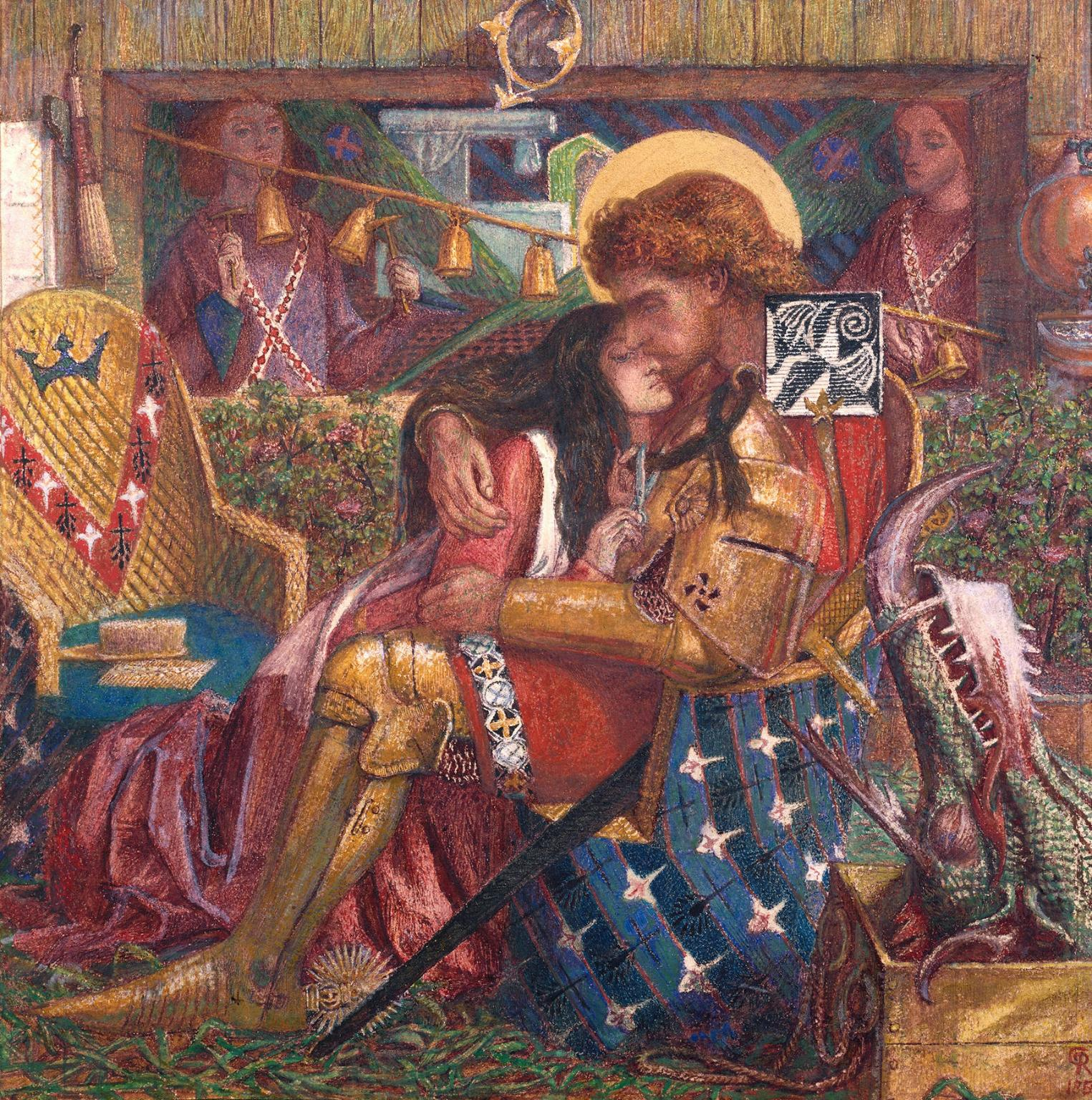
- The Wedding of St. George and Princess Sabra by Dante Gabriel Rossetti, 1857.
- Gender: Feminine
- Language: Arabic

Origin
- Meaning: Patience, tenacity

Other names
- Related names: Sabrah, Sabreen, Sabreena, Sabrina, Sabryn, Sabryna

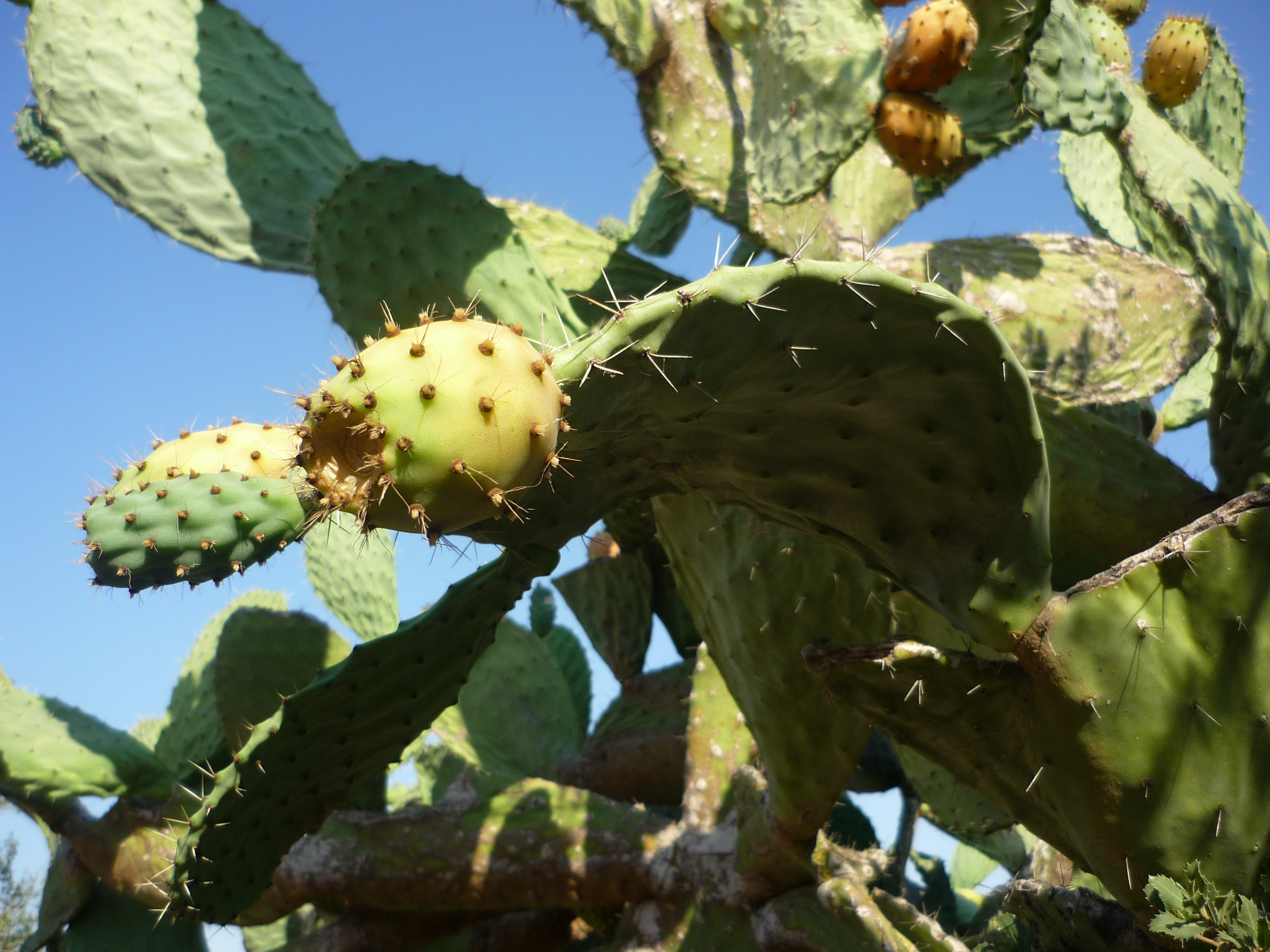
A prickly pear cactus, which is known in Hebrew as "tzabar" or "sabra" (צַבָּר)

Sabra or Sabrah is both a given name and surname with multiple origins. As an English feminine given name, it has been in use since the 18th century. It is sometimes considered a variant of the name Sabrina. In some instances in the Anglosphere, the name might be a literary reference. In Elizabethan era writer Richard Johnson's 1596 romance Seven Champions of Christendom, Sabra is the name given to the Egyptian princess rescued by Saint George from a dragon. A version of this story later appeared in Reliques of Ancient English Poetry collected by Thomas Percy and published in 1765. In the romance, the victorious Saint George then marries the princess. The story was also a favorite subject of Pre-Raphaelite artists during the 19th century.

Sabra is also the English translation of tzabar (Hebrew: צבר), the Hebrew word for the prickly pear cactus. Sabra has been a Hebrew term for a native-born Israeli since the 1930s. This term is derived from the related Arabic word for this cactus, صبار ṣubbār, where the related term sabr also translates to "patience" or "tenacity".

== Women ==
- Sabra R. Greenhalgh (1877–1969), American educator
- Sabra Johnson (born 1987), American dancer
- Sabra Jones, American actress, director, writer, and producer
- Sabra Klein, American microbiologist
- Sabra Lane (born c. 1968), Australian journalist and radio presenter
- Sabra Loomis (born 1938), Irish-American poet
- Sabra Moore (born 1943), American artist
- Sabra Newby, American politician
- Sabra Wilbur Vought (1877–1942), American librarian
- Sabra Williams (born c. 1970), British actress

== Men ==
- Sabrah ibn Ma'bad (fl. c. 600 CE), Arabian religious leader

== Fictional characters ==
- Sabra, a princess rescued by St. George from a dragon in writer Richard Johnson's 1596 romance Seven Champions of Christendom
- Sabra (character), a fictional Israeli female superhero in the Marvel Comics universe
- Sabra Cravat, a character in the 1930 novel Cimarron by American novelist Edna Ferber and the 1931 and 1960 film adaptations based upon the novel
