= Sabra taibaishanensis =

Scientific classification
- Domain: Eukaryota
- Kingdom: Animalia
- Phylum: Arthropoda
- Class: Insecta
- Order: Lepidoptera
- Family: Drepanidae
- Genus: Sabra
- Species: S. taibaishanensis

Binomial name
- Sabra taibaishanensis (Chou & Xiang, 1987)

Synonyms
- Palaeodrepana taibaishanensis Chou & Xiang, 1987

Species of hook-tip moth

Sabra taibaishanensis is a moth in the family Drepanidae. It was described by Chou and Xiang in 1987. It is found in China.
