= Sabra sinica =

Scientific classification
- Domain: Eukaryota
- Kingdom: Animalia
- Phylum: Arthropoda
- Class: Insecta
- Order: Lepidoptera
- Family: Drepanidae
- Genus: Sabra
- Species: S. sinica

Binomial name
- Sabra sinica (Yang, 1978)

Synonyms
- Palaeodrepana sinica Yang, 1978

Species of hook-tip moth

Sabra sinica is a moth in the family Drepanidae. It was described by Yang in 1978. It is found in China.
