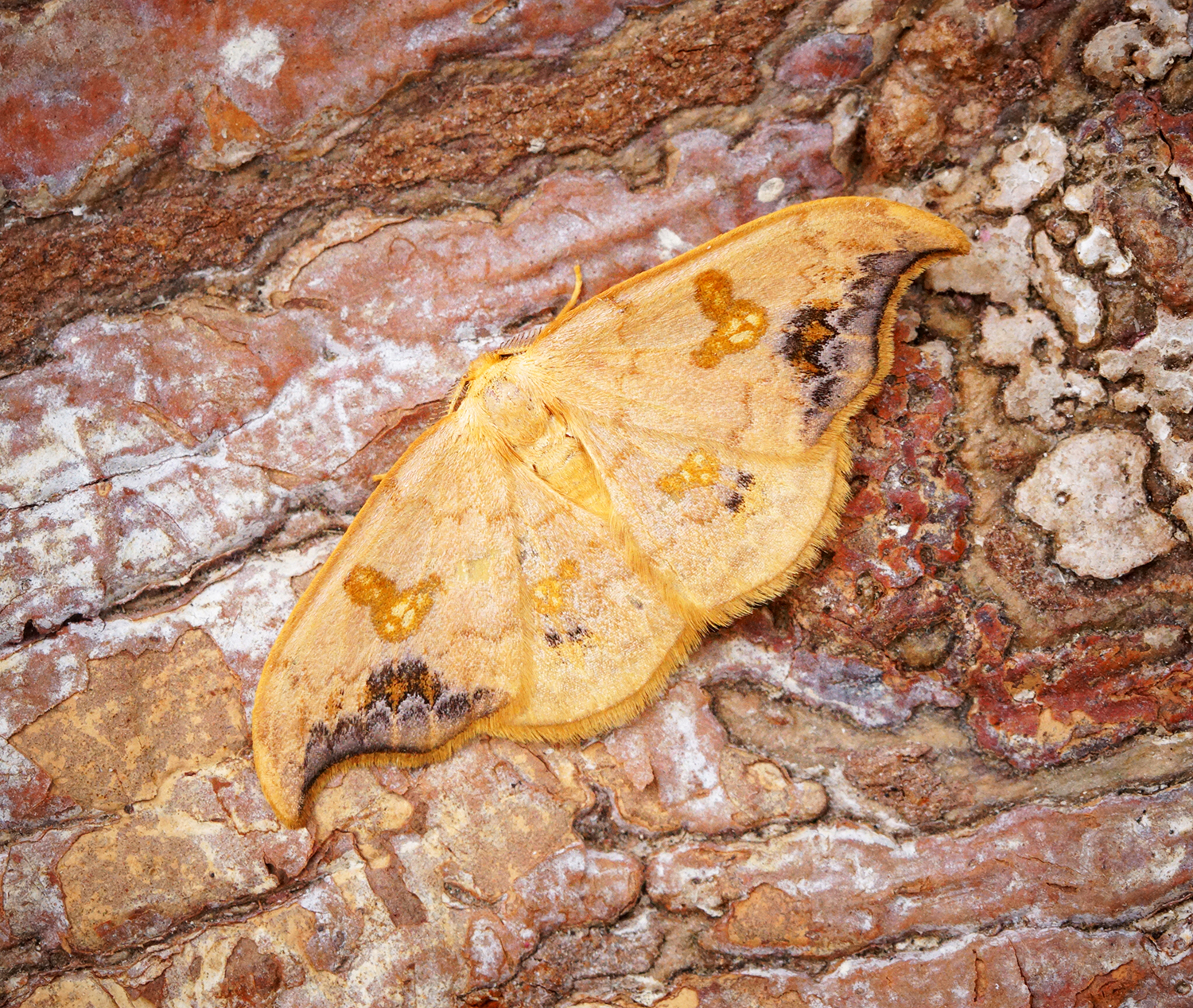

Scientific classification
- Domain: Eukaryota
- Kingdom: Animalia
- Phylum: Arthropoda
- Class: Insecta
- Order: Lepidoptera
- Family: Drepanidae
- Genus: Sabra
- Species: S. harpagula

Binomial name
- Sabra harpagula (Esper, 1786)

Synonyms
- Bombyx harpagula Esper, 1786; Palaeodrepana harpagula bitorosa Watson, 1968; Palaeodrepana harpagula emarginata Watson, 1968; Palaeodrepana harpagula olivacea Inoue, 1958

= Sabra harpagula =

Species of hook-tip moth

Sabra harpagula, the scarce hook-tip, is a moth of the family Drepanidae first described by Eugenius Johann Christoph Esper in 1786. It is found from Europe through temperate Asia to Japan.

The wingspan is 25–35 mm. The moth flies from June to August depending on the location.

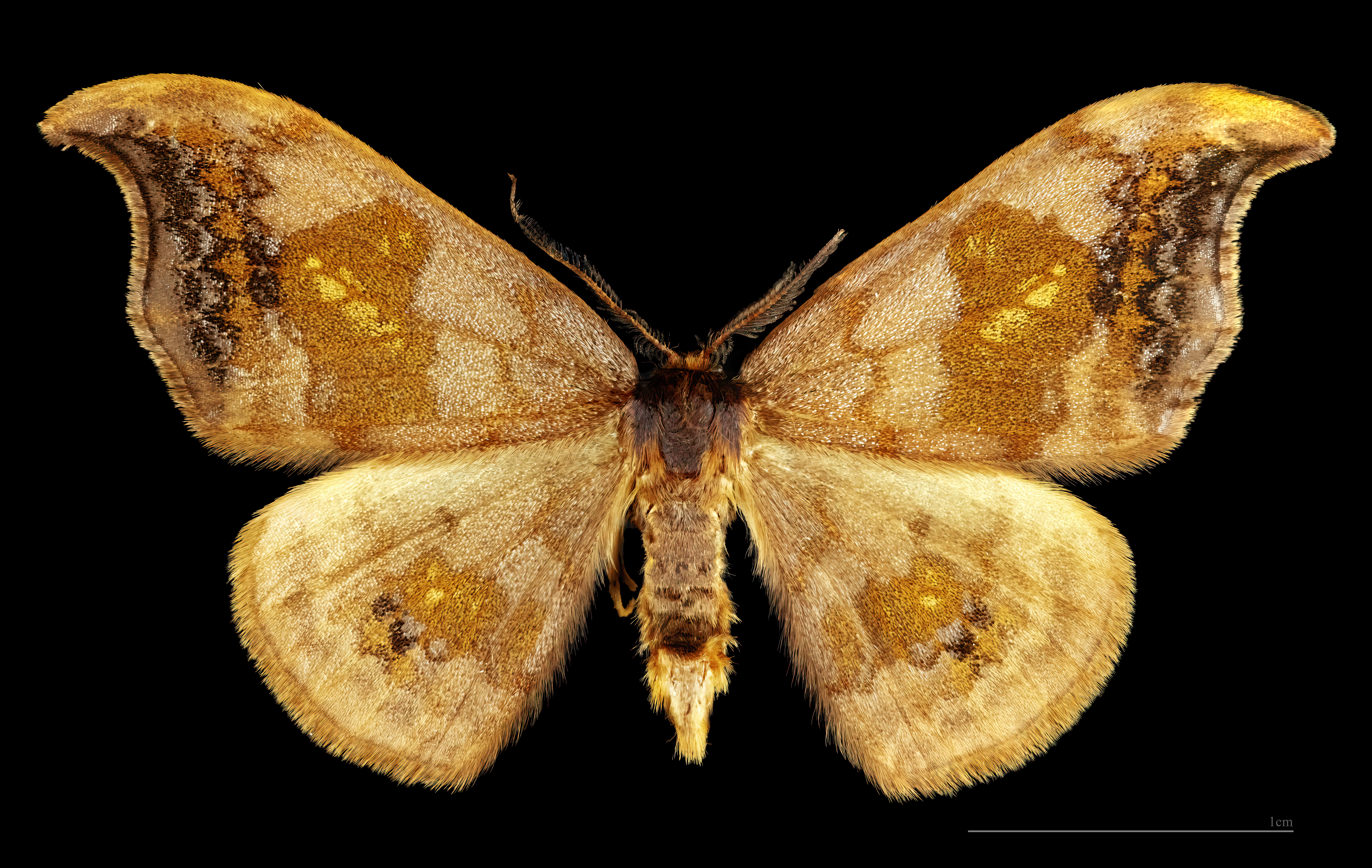
♂

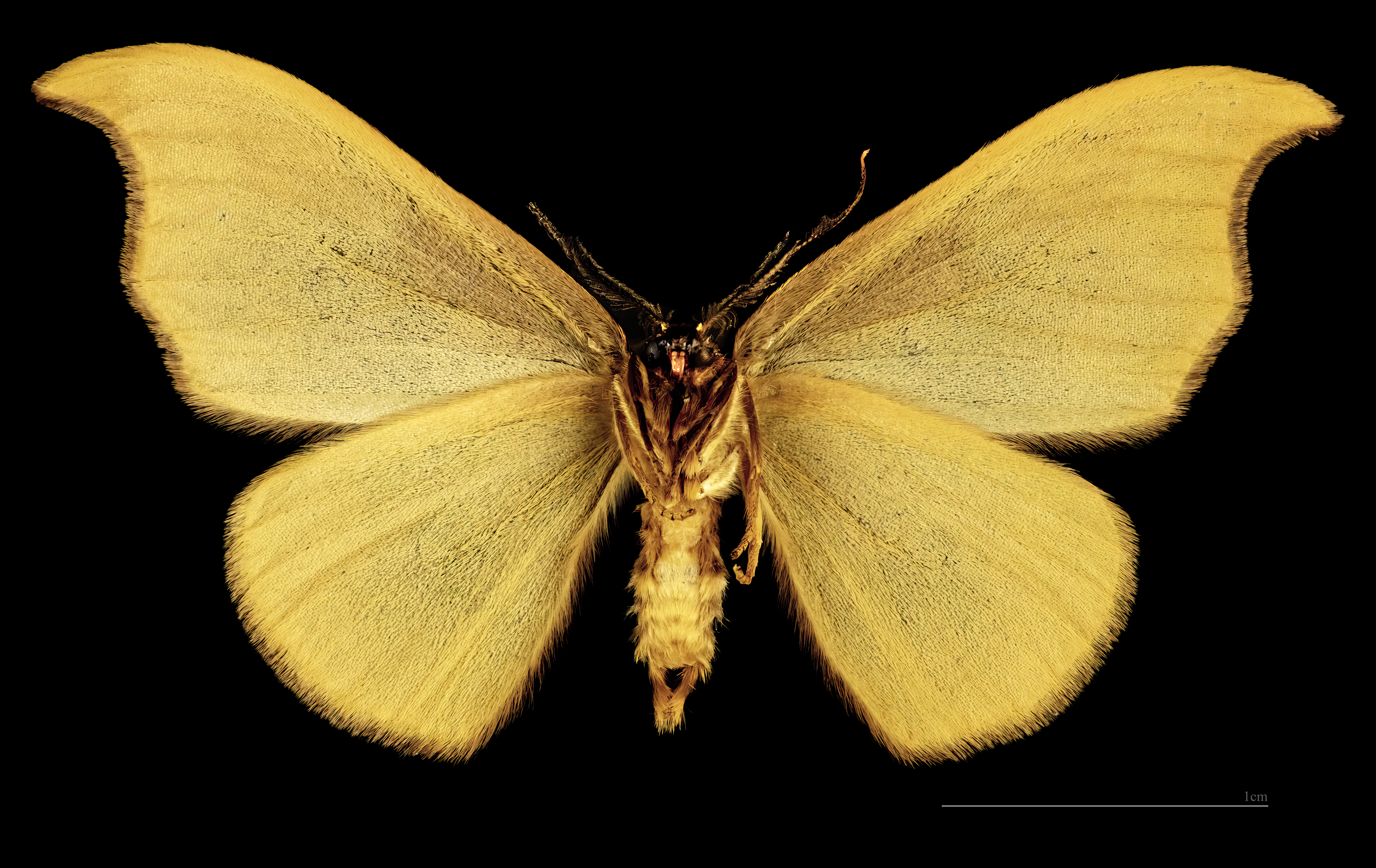
♂ △

The larvae feed on Tilia (including Tilia cordata), Quercus, Alnus and Betula species.

== Subspecies ==
- Sabra harpagula harpagula (Europe, south-eastern Russia, Manchuria)
- Sabra harpagula bitorosa (Watson, 1968) (China: Sichuan, Shaanxi)
- Sabra harpagula emarginata (Watson, 1968) (China: Zhejiang, Fujian)
- Sabra harpagula euroista Park, 2011 (Korea)
- Sabra harpagula olivacea (Inoue, 1958) (Japan)
