= Sabra (surname) =

Sabra or Sabrah is both a given name and surname with multiple origins. The term Sabra is also derived from the Arabic sabr, meaning patience. Sabra is also the Arabic name for the Opuntia, a type of prickly pear cactus. The term was adopted by Hebrew speakers in Israel for the cactus and is also a colloquial term used since the 1930s to describe someone who is born in Israel.

Notable people with the name include:

== Surname ==
- A. I. Sabra (1924–2013), Egyptian historian of science
- Abba Sabra (fl. c. 1450), Ethiopian religious leader
- Adam Sabra (born 1968), American professor of Islamic studies
- George Sabra (born 1947), Syrian politician
- Khalilah Sabra (born 1967), American author and activist
- Maher Sabra (born 1992), Lebanese footballer
- Wadia Sabra (1876–1952), Lebanese composer
