= Max Brenner =

Israeli chocolate company

- Max Brenner logo

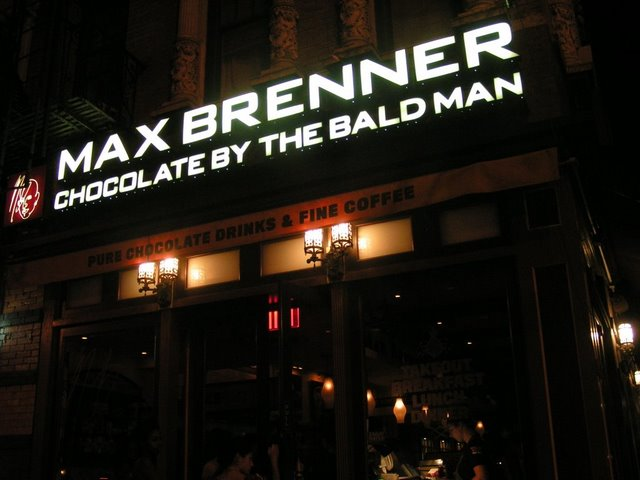
- Max Brenner shop
- Native name: מקס ברנר
- Type: Private
- Industry: Food and beverage; Chocolate; Restaurants; Retail
- Founded: 1996; 30 years ago in Ra'anana, Israel
- Founders: Max Fichtman; Oded Brenner
- Headquarters: Ra'anana, Israel
- Number of locations: 36 (2024)
- Area served: Australia; Israel; United States
- Products: Chocolate; Desserts; Hot chocolate; Waffles; Crêpes; Milkshakes
- Brands: Max Brenner
- Owner: Yaniv Shtanger; Dudu Vaknin
- Website: maxbrenner.com

Max Brenner (Hebrew: מקס ברנר) is an Israeli multinational chocolate restaurant and retail brand. The company operates 36 locations internationally, the majority (24) of which are in Australia. Other locations include ten in Israel and two in the United States (New York City). It specializes in chocolate-based desserts such as fondue, crepes, milkshakes, waffles, and hot chocolate, many of which it serves in signature utensils. Max Brenner is owned by Yaniv Shtanger and Dudu Vaknin.

Max Brenner chocolates are certified kosher by the Nof HaGalil Rabbinate.

== History ==
=== 1996–2001: An emerging company ===
The company was founded in 1996 in Ra'anana, Israel, by Max Fichtman and Oded Brenner (Hebrew: עודד ברנר) who combined their names. The business began as a small shop selling handmade chocolates.

Working as an apprentice in Paris, Brenner met chocolatier Michel Chaudun and convinced the maestro to take him on. He spent the following six years learning the art of chocolate-making in Paris. Upon his return to Israel, he opened the first shop, with a workshop in the back, named "Handmade Chocolate by Max Brenner", in Ra’anana. By 1999, Fichtman and Brenner had opened ten chocolate shops.

A chance meeting with an Israeli entrepreneur in 1999 sparked the idea of expanding his business, and the first of the Max Brenner-branded cafes opened in Australia, in Sydney's hip suburb of Paddington, in 2000. This newly opened “Max Brenner Chocolate Bar” was to be the centre of Max Brenner's new chocolate culture, combining a chocolate bar and a chocolate shop.

=== 2001–2017: The Strauss years ===
In 2001, the chain became part of the Strauss Group, Israel's second-largest food and beverage company. Max Brenner sourced raw materials for its products from a project in Tanzania, owned by Swiss chocolate manufacturer Barry Callebaut. In the period from 2002 to 2005, Max Brenner opened locations in Israel, Singapore, and the Philippines, while continuing to open new locations in Australia. In 2006, Max Brenner opened their first chocolate bar in the United States in New York City.

In 2010, a new Max Brenner restaurant and chocolate store opened in the U.S. at Caesars Palace, Las Vegas, followed by another store opening in Boston and Philadelphia during the next year, offering both sweet and savory menu options.

In 2013, the company unveiled a new strategy, under which it started to move away from full-service restaurants and adopted a fast-casual concept named a Chocolate Bar. The first of these opened in Bethesda, Maryland in June 2013, with three more opening in Tokyo, Japan, and Moscow, Russia via franchise agreements. The company opened its second US Chocolate Bar in Paramus, New Jersey in April 2014. In Australia, Max Brenner had expanded to 37 restaurants across Queensland, New South Wales, Victoria, the Northern Territory, and the Australian Capital Territory.

=== Since 2017: Independent again ===
In May 2017, Strauss Group sold Max Brenner brand to Israeli franchisees Yaniv Shtanger and Dudu Vaknin for 18 million NIS (US$5 million).

On 1 October 2018, Max Brenner's Australian business went into voluntary administration, citing rising costs and sluggish retail trade. On 8 October 2018, 20 of the 37 Australian Max Brenner locations were permanently closed. In November 2018, the Australian cinema owner and singer Roy Mustaca bought the 17 remaining Australian Max Brenner franchises out of receivership.

In February 2026, Max Brenner's US business filed for Chapter 11 bankruptcy protection.

== Max Brenner Australia ==
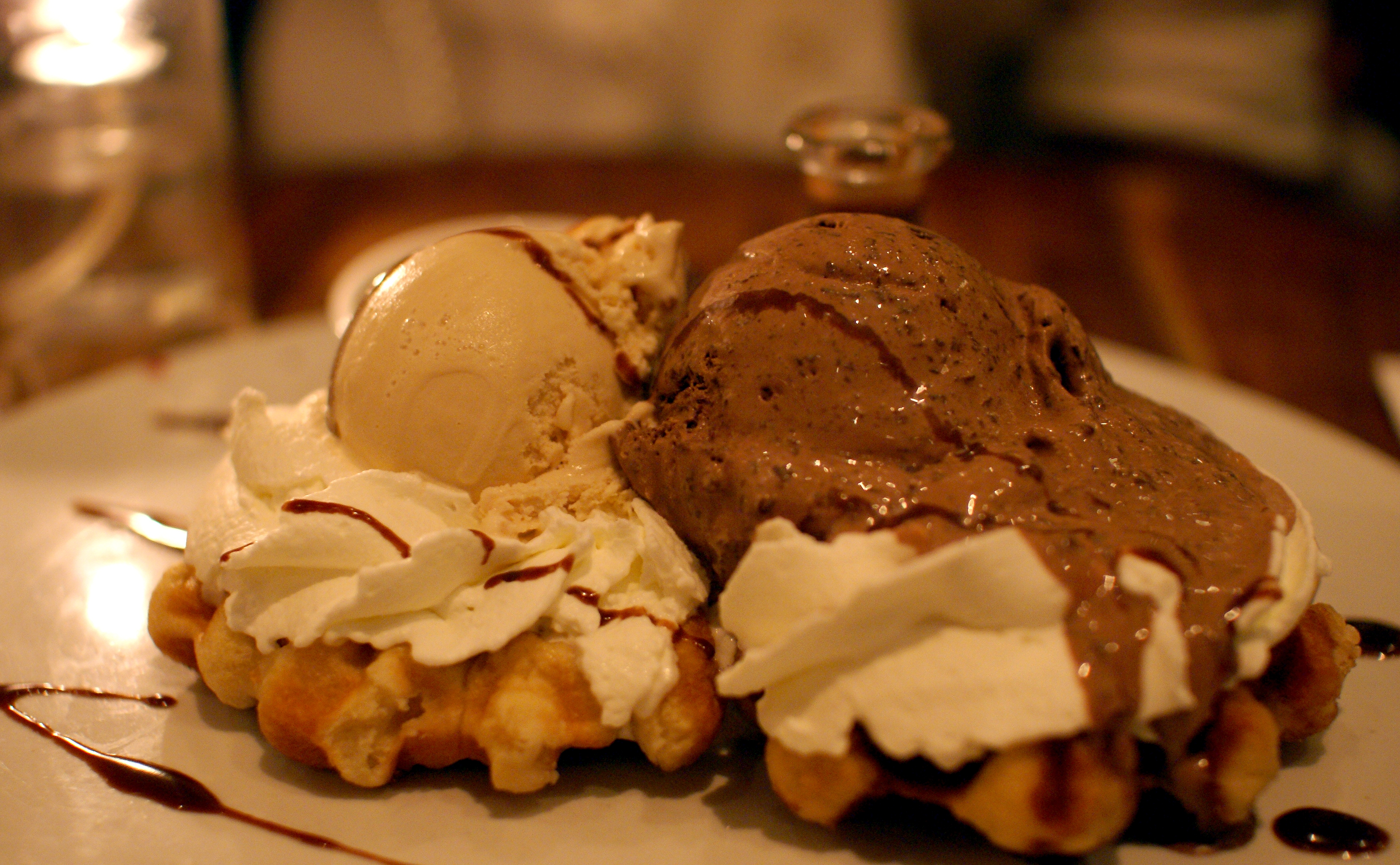
Ice cream and waffles from Max Brenner

Max Brenner was introduced to Australia in 2000, with its first Chocolate Bar opening in Paddington, Sydney. Its menu includes chocolate and desserts including its own-recipe chocolate, hot chocolates, chocolate fondue, tutti frutti waffles and decadent pizzas as well as crockery such as the 'hug mug'.

In 2018, the business went into administration and Max Brenner’s Asia Pacific (APAC) arm was acquired by an Australian owned and operated family business, Vitocco Enterprises. Under new leadership, the company had national and international expansion plans, including its first international Chocolate Bar which opened in late 2021 in Queenstown, New Zealand.

The Australian business is independent of the Israel and US businesses with its head office located in Sydney, Australia. In 2021, three new Chocolate Bars opened in Ed Square, World Square and Southland, Cheltenham. There are currently 25 Chocolate Bars in Australia.

== Boycotts ==
The Strauss Group states on their website that they provide care packages to soldiers in the IDF's Golani Brigade, leading to activists targeting Max Brenner stores for boycotts Boycott, Divestment and Sanctions campaign. In 2011, pro-Palestinian activist group Students for Palestine organized a series of protests outside Max Brenner outlets in Australia. The protest in Melbourne led to 19 arrests.

The protests have drawn condemnation from then Foreign Minister of Australia (and former prime minister) Kevin Rudd, who remarked "I don't think in 21st-century Australia there is a place for the attempted boycott of a Jewish business." In September 2011, the Australian Competition & Consumer Commission said that "the protesters had not broken federal competition law because the protests did not cause substantial loss or damage to the Max Brenner chocolate stores." Some pro-Palestinian organizations including Australians for Palestine have distanced themselves from the protests but have publicly defended the choice of Max Brenner as a boycott target. In October 2011, Izzat Abdulhadi, head of the General Delegation of Palestine to Australia said that he is against the "full-scale" BDS campaign, and in particular expressed his anger over the occasionally violent protests at the Max Brenner stores, saying, "BDS is a non-violent process and I don't think it's the right of anybody to use BDS as a violent action or to prevent people from buying from any place."

Protest organizers consistently denied that the protests were violent, and instead accused the police of acting with brutality.

Julia Gillard denounced the planned protest against the Max Brenner shop on the Kensington campus of University of New South Wales, accusing the organizers of engaging in an ugly attempt to spread anti-Semitism and Holocaust-denial. In a survey conducted by the university to ascertain which new stores students and faculty wanted on campus, a Max Brenner chocolate shop was the second most popular choice.

Max Brenner Australia spokespersons stated that the sole shareholders of the franchise operation in Australia are a young Australian couple who have no direct connection to the Strauss Group. The franchise employs over 1,100 Australian residents across four states.

In May 2013, The Australian newspaper reported on a YouTube video segment featuring an interview with Palestine Action Group Sydney spokesperson Patrick Harrison at a protest outside the Parramatta Max Brenner store. Harrison stated in the interview: "financially speaking there isn't really any connection between this Max Brenner store in particular and Israel," and that the retail outlet has become a "cultural ambassador for Israel", which the newspaper used to argue that protests were unjustified. In response, the Palestine Action Group pointed out earlier reports by the Australian acknowledging that Max Brenner is a brand of the Strauss Group. Harrison responded by pointing out that Max Brenner's Australian franchise operations are referenced in the Strauss Group's annual report, and argued that the Australian franchisees should hand back their licenses to Strauss to signal their opposition to Strauss's support for the Israeli occupation.

In the early 2010s, BDS activists protested outside the Clarendon St, South Melbourne, store handing leaflets to people passing by. In October 2014, this store closed.

== Awards and recognition ==
In April 2014, Max Brenner won the 2014 Webby Awards in the food and drink category, for the best website by both the public and the academy's panel of experts.

== Gallery ==
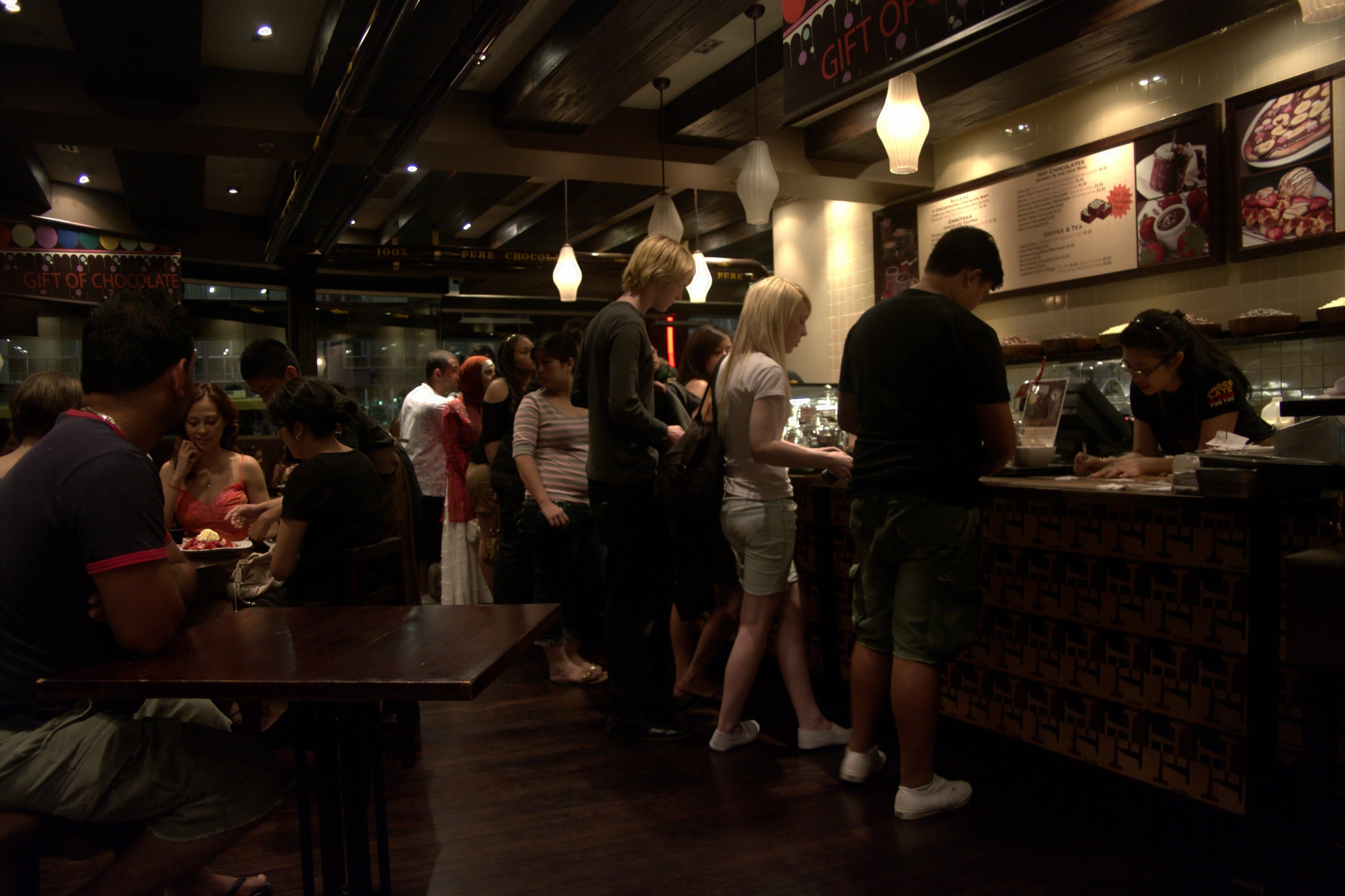
Max Brenner store in Parramatta, New South Wales

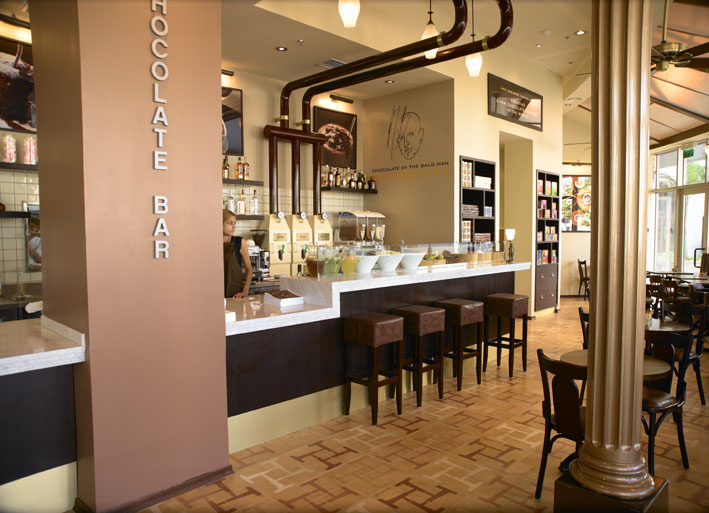
Max Brenner chocolate bar in Herzliya, Israel
