= Michael Strauss (industrialist) =

Israeli business magnate and industrialist (1934–2020)

- מיכאל שטראוס
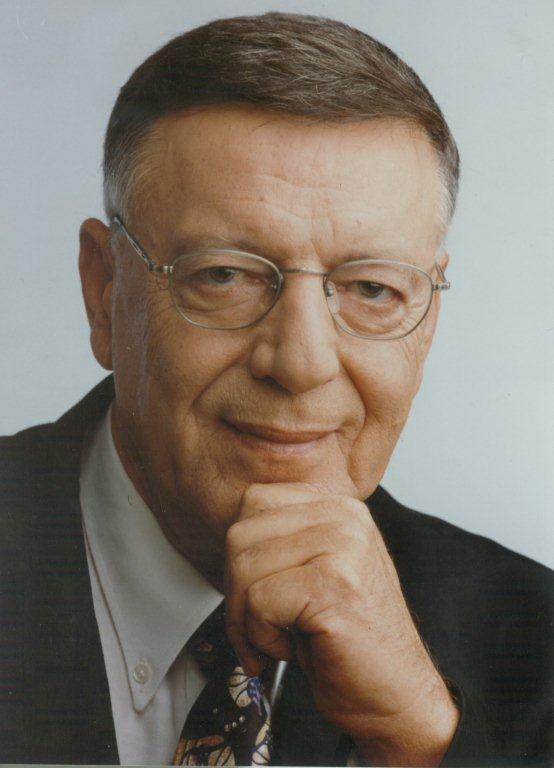
- Born: 1934; Ulm, Germany
- Died: 17 October 2020 (aged 85–86)
- Occupations: Chairman and President of Strauss Group
- Years active: 1958–2001
- Children: 3
- Parent(s): Dr. Richard Strauss, Hilda Strauss

Michael Strauss (Hebrew: מיכאל שטראוס; born 1 May 1934 – 17 October 2020) was an Israeli business magnate and industrialist who served as chairman of Strauss-Elite from 1975 to 2001.

== Biography ==
Michael Strauss was born in Germany to a Jewish family. He was the son of the family business founders Hilda and Dr. Richard Strauss. In 1936 his family immigrated to Mandatory Palestine. His family settled in Nahariya. He held a degree in Business Management from Harvard University. Michael Strauss was married to Ella until their divorce in 1981, with whom he had three children: Ofra, Irit and Adi. In 1996 he married Revital (born 1964), 29 years his junior, a marriage that ended in divorce in 2008.

== Business career ==
After filling a number of roles in the company, he was appointed chairman of Strauss Group in 1975 following the death of his father, a position he held until his formal retirement in 2001 upon which he handed over the job to his daughter Ofra Strauss who was groomed for the position. Following his retirement from chairman he continued serving as a board member in the public company until 2011 and has continued to hold the chairmanship, along with co-ownership (with sister Raya Strauss), of Strauss Holdings the private company controlling Strauss Group, as well as continued informal involvement in the public company.

During his years as Chairman and President of Strauss he made strategic partnerships with Unilever and Danone, and led significant mergers and acquisitions within the Israeli food industry, most notably of Elite. During Strauss's tenure Strauss Group expanded from being a dairy focused business to become the second largest Israeli food product conglomerate.

== Awards and recognition ==
- 1977-1978 Strauss nominated chairman of the Israel publishers’ association
- 1983 The Israel Industry Prize named after Elihau Fromenchenko is awarded to Strauss on behalf of the Manufacturers Association of Israel for “his managing achievements, initiatives in developing and promoting private industry in Israel”
- 1987-1991 Strauss is appointed head of the food division in the Israeli industry association. He serves there during 2 terms. Subsequently, he serves as a member of the presidium of the Industrialists association.
- 1989-1997 Strauss nominated chairman of ”HAMIL” – Israeli center for managements and marketing" and serves two terms.
- 2006 D&B Company awards Strauss for excellence in directorship
- 2006 The city of Acre, Israel designates Strauss as an honorary resident for his “contribution and initiative fostering the city in the fields of education, economy and tourism and bringing it to the place it deserves”
- 2007 Israeli Prime Minister Ehud Olmert’s Conference for export and international cooperation awards Strauss a Letter of appreciation for “a lifetime achievement and longstanding contribution to the development of the Israeli Galilee and Israel’s strength”.
