= Sabra, Burkina Faso =

Sabra
- Location in Burkina Faso
- Country: Burkina Faso
- Region: Est Region
- Province: Gnagna Province
- Department: Bilanga Department

Population (2019)
  - Total: 2,892

Sabra is a town in the Bilanga Department of Gnagna Province in eastern Burkina Faso.

Population
Year	Pop.	±%
2006	2,060	—
2019	2,892	+40.4%
