= Sabra (textile) =

Moroccan textile term for lustrous yarns and textiles

Sabra, also marketed as cactus silk, sabra silk or vegetable silk, is a term used in Morocco for lustrous yarns and textiles used in weaving, clothing decoration and other handicrafts. In documented Moroccan craft contexts, material called sabra has been identified as rayon.

== Terminology ==
The term sabra does not have a single standardized textile definition. In Moroccan craft contexts it has been used for shiny textile yarns and threads, sometimes interchangeably with hrir, the Arabic word for silk.

In a 2008 doctoral thesis based on ethnographic research into carpet production and marketing in southern Morocco, anthropologist Myriem N. Naji described sabra as an industrially obtained shiny material used in decorative haberdashery for sofas and traditional clothing, including djellabas and kaftans. Naji stated that the material was commonly called hrir and noted that some carpet dealers used the ambiguity between shiny sabra and silk when marketing flatwoven carpets to tourists.

Anthropologist Susan Schaefer Davis documented similar terminology among traditional button makers in Sefrou. Davis identified the thread used by the artisans as rayon and recorded one artisan explaining that it could be called either hrir or sabra, although it was not actual silk. Davis wrote that natural silk had previously been used for Moroccan kaftan buttons but was replaced by rayon during the twentieth century.

The expressions cactus silk, sabra silk and vegetable silk are therefore not reliable descriptions of fibre composition. Under European Union textile-fibre nomenclature, silk refers to fibre obtained exclusively from silk-secreting insects.

== Composition ==
=== Rayon ===
Independent sources predating the 2018 investigation of the sabra trade identify Moroccan material called sabra as rayon.

A 2009 article in the specialist weaving magazine Handwoven, describing a visit to the Ensemble Artisanal in Marrakesh, reported a weaver using rayon chenille together with sabra and described the sabra as a type of rayon. Davis likewise identified rayon as the material called sabra by the button makers she studied.

In 2018, the Moroccan artisan organisation Anou investigated the supply chain of yarn sold as sabra. It reported tracing material purchased from Moroccan suppliers to imported yarn whose packaging identified it as rayon. Anou also reported testing commercially obtained sabra yarn and identifying it as rayon.

The investigation was subsequently reported by the design and materials consultancy FranklinTill. Annie Warburton wrote that examination of packaging and material testing had identified the investigated fibre as rayon and that distributors acknowledged that the yarn was not produced in Morocco.

Rayon is a manufactured regenerated-cellulose fibre. Although its raw material is plant-derived cellulose, it is distinct from a natural leaf fibre mechanically extracted from an agave plant.

=== Acetate ===
Anou also traced a separate supply chain for material regarded by some artisans as a higher-quality form of sabra. According to the organisation, a manufacturer near Barcelona identified the material it supplied as acetate filament.

This finding concerned a particular supply chain and does not establish how commonly acetate is sold as sabra.

=== Agave fibre ===
Natural fibres can be obtained from species of Agave. Recognized agave textile fibres include sisal, henequen and maguey.

The term sabra has also been used for an actual agave fibre in Moroccan scientific literature. In 2019, Wafa Ouarhim and colleagues published a study in the Journal of Bionic Engineering comparing alfa fibre with what they described as "Sabra fibers (Agave americana L.)" obtained as a Moroccan crop residue. The fibres were investigated as reinforcement material in rubber biocomposites.

The study documents the existence of natural Agave americana fibre described as sabra in Morocco. It did not examine commercially sold "cactus silk" yarn or establish that the lustrous yarn marketed under that name is manufactured from agave.

The scientific use of sabra for agave fibre and the documented use of the same term for rayon therefore represent different uses of the name.

== Botanical terminology ==
Commercial accounts of sabra have variously referred to cactus, agave and aloe plants, although these terms are not botanically interchangeable.

Agave americana belongs to the family Asparagaceae and is not a member of the cactus family Cactaceae. The Royal Botanic Gardens, Kew gives its native range as the southern United States to Mexico and records it as an introduced species in Morocco.

Aloe vera is a different plant belonging to the family Asphodelaceae. Descriptions referring to an "aloe cactus", aloe and agave therefore do not identify the same botanical source.

The name cactus silk is consequently neither a botanical identification nor a standardized textile-fibre designation.

== Use in Moroccan textiles ==
Sabra yarn and thread have been documented in several Moroccan crafts. Naji recorded its use in decorative haberdashery, traditional garments and shiny flatwoven carpets. Davis documented rayon thread called sabra in the production of traditional buttons for kaftans and djellabas. Handwoven recorded its use by a weaver at the Ensemble Artisanal in Marrakesh.

The composition of the yarn is separate from the method used to produce the finished object. A textile made from industrially manufactured rayon or acetate yarn may still be handwoven, embroidered, knotted or otherwise worked by Moroccan artisans.

== Marketing and provenance claims ==
FranklinTill reported that a narrative describing sabra as a cactus-derived fibre harvested in the Sahara and processed by Amazigh women using a centuries-old traditional method became widespread in commercial descriptions during the 2000s. Its account of Anou's investigation contrasted these claims with supply-chain evidence identifying the commercial yarn investigated as imported rayon.

Published research nevertheless documents natural agave fibre called sabra in Morocco. The issue is therefore not whether agave fibre exists, but whether claims that individual commercial textiles sold as "cactus silk" are made from such fibre can be substantiated.

== See also ==
- Artificial silk
- Cellulose acetate
- Rayon
- Sisal
- Silk
