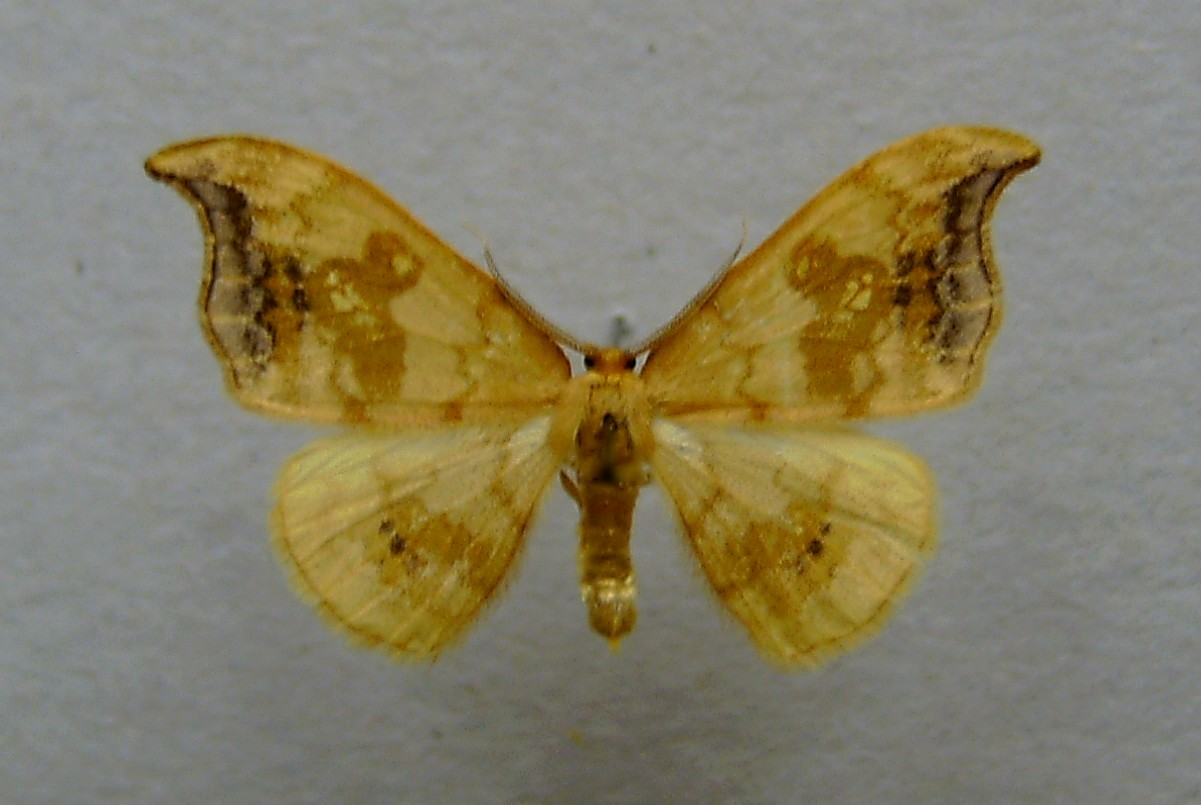
- Sabra harpagula

Scientific classification
- Domain: Eukaryota
- Kingdom: Animalia
- Phylum: Arthropoda
- Class: Insecta
- Order: Lepidoptera
- Family: Drepanidae
- Subfamily: Drepaninae
- Genus: Sabra; Bode, 1907

Synonyms
- Palaeodrepana Inoue, 1962

= Sabra (moth) =

Moth genus in family Drepanidae

Sabra is a genus of moths belonging to the subfamily Drepaninae.

== Species ==
- Sabra harpagula (Esper, [1786])
- Sabra sinica (Yang, 1978)
- Sabra taibaishanensis (Chou & Xiang, 1987)
