= Shimon Lankri =

Israeli politician

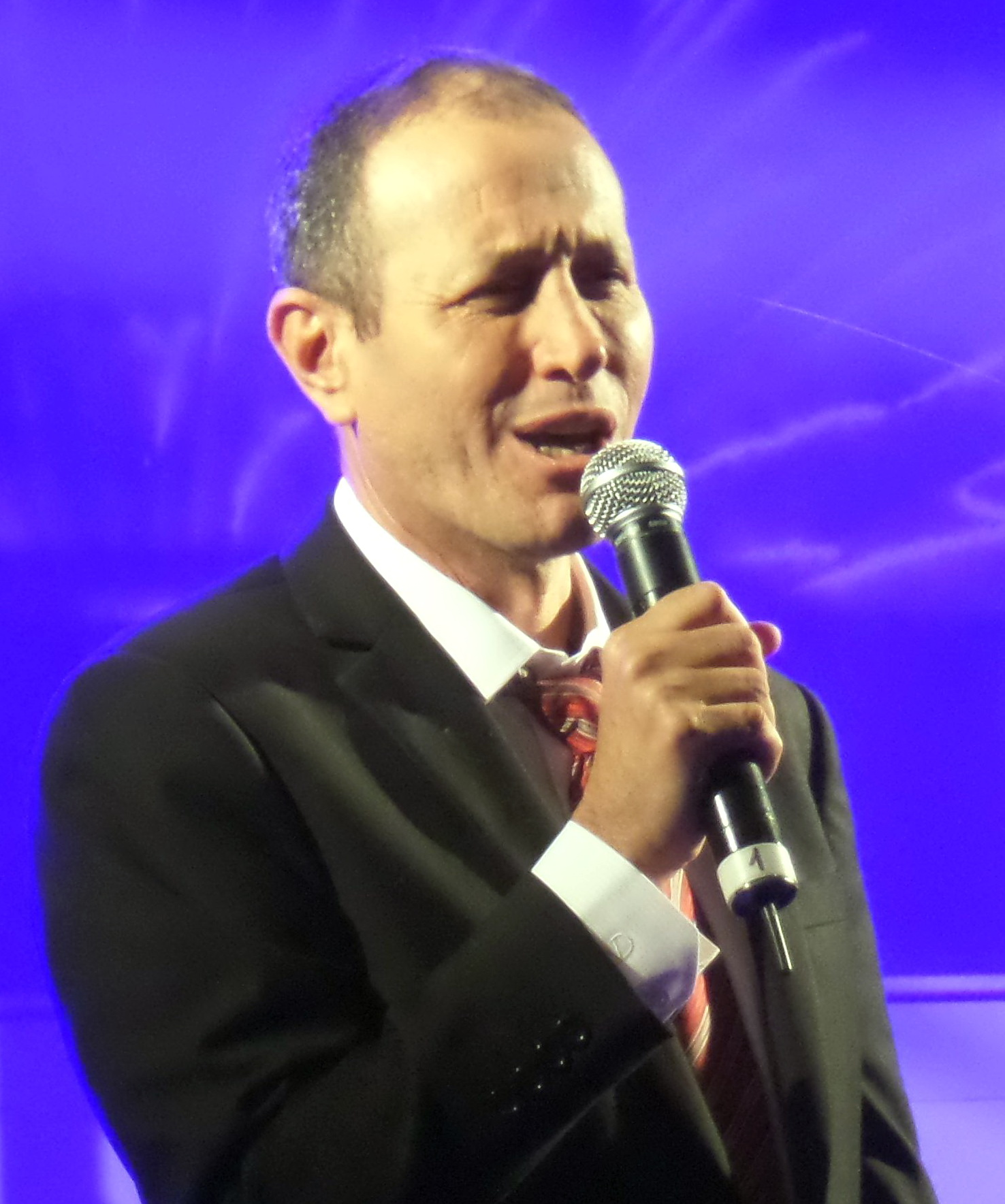
Lankri in 2014.

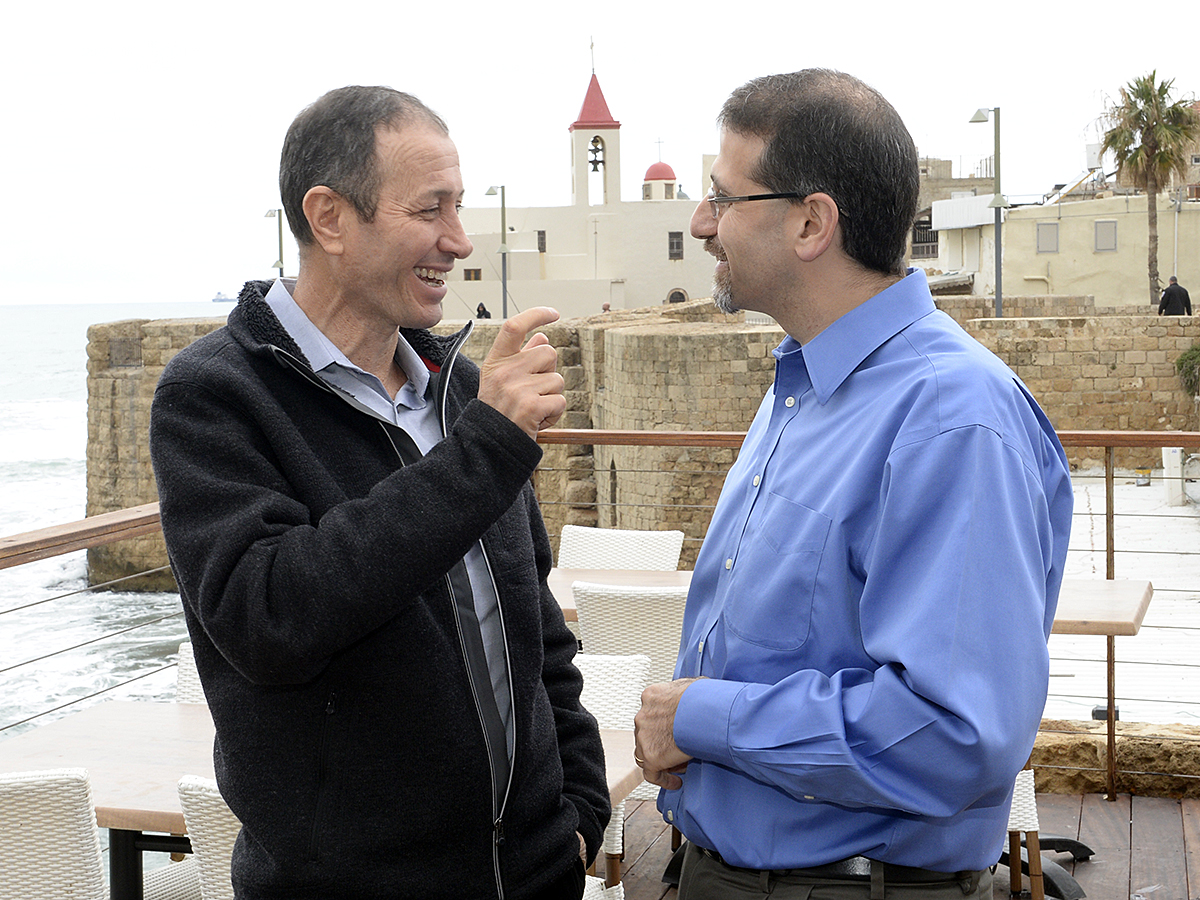
Lankri (on left) visiting Galilee.

Shimon Lankri (Hebrew: שמעון לנקרי; born 16 November 1961) is the former mayor of Acre, Israel. He was first elected in 2003, and reelected in 2008, 2013 and 2018.

In 2013, Lankri was shot by masked gunmen while he was driving near his home. In 2015, he visited Azerbaijan with the head of Acre's Azerbaijani Mountain Jews community.

In 2016, he was part of the inauguration of a 45-minute ferry service between Haifa and Acre.

In 2017, Lankri and national government leaders announced plans to expand housing for a projected doubling of the city's size.

Lankri was part of the opening of an American Corners in Acre. Lankri is a member of Pnima, a group working to alleviate divisions among Jews in Israel. Lankri supports youth centers that double as pool halls.

== Arab-Jewish relations ==
Arab residents of Acre have expressed concerns about getting their fair share of services and schools, and have become increasingly concerned over very religious and nationalist Jewish settlers having moved to the city, but Lankri has said all residents are treated equally and supported development projects.

Lankri has been chairman of the Acre Festival. In 2008 he cancelled the festival after clashes between Muslim and Jewish residents.

In 2017, Lankri supported a proposed ban of a Palestinian performance of a play about Palestinian prisoners in Israel from the Fringe Theater Festival of Acre.
