= Sabra liqueur =

Israeli liqueur

Sabra liqueur

Sabra liqueur is a chocolate-orange flavored liqueur produced in Israel.

The primary flavor of Sabra is a rich, bittersweet chocolate. The dense chocolate is cut by the sweet and sour taste of Jaffa oranges. Slightly chilling Sabra liqueur strengthens the chocolate taste, while slightly warming it brings out the citrus taste. Sabra is 30% alcohol by volume.

The Sabra bottle design is based on a 2,000-year-old Phoenician wine flask found in a Tel Aviv museum.

Sabra was developed and introduced in 1963 by Edgar Bronfman, Sr., the head of Seagram, to be an identifiably Israeli liqueur. Its name is a term used affectionately to describe a native-born Israeli Jew, a term derived from the Hebrew name of a prickly pear cactus that grows in Israel. The original liqueur was made from this cactus fruit, but did not succeed and was quickly changed to the successful chocolate-orange product.

There are now two Sabra liqueurs, all produced by Binyamina Winery, and all are kosher and kosher for Passover. The newer products are Sabra Coffee liqueur, launched in 1985, and Grand Sabra, an orange-flavored brandy, launched in 2006.

The product is still produced at Binyamina wines and is available under this name by other manufacturers.

== See also ==
- Chocolate liqueur
