= Strauss Group =

Food products manufacturer

Strauss Group Ltd.
- Type: Public
- Traded as: TASE: STRS
- Industry: Food processing; Beverages
- Founded: 1939; 87 years ago
- Founders: Richard & Hilde Strauss; Eliyahu Fromenchenko (Elite); Mara Mosevics-Gottlieb (Elite)
- Headquarters: Petah Tikva, Israel
- Areas served: Asia; Europe; North America; Oceania; South America
- Key people: Ofra Strauss (chairwoman); Shai Babad (president and CEO); Ariel Chetrit (EVP/CFO); Hila Mukevisius (SVP HR)
- Products: Dairy products; Coffee; Chocolate; Mediterranean dips; Water
- Revenue: ▲₪ 5.69 billion (2019)
- Operating income: ▲₪ 878 million (2019)
- Net income: ▲₪ 594 million (2019)
- Number of employees: 15,000
- Subsidiaries: Strauss Coffee; Strauss Israel; Strauss Water; PepsiCo–Strauss Fresh Dips & Spreads
- Website: strauss-group.com

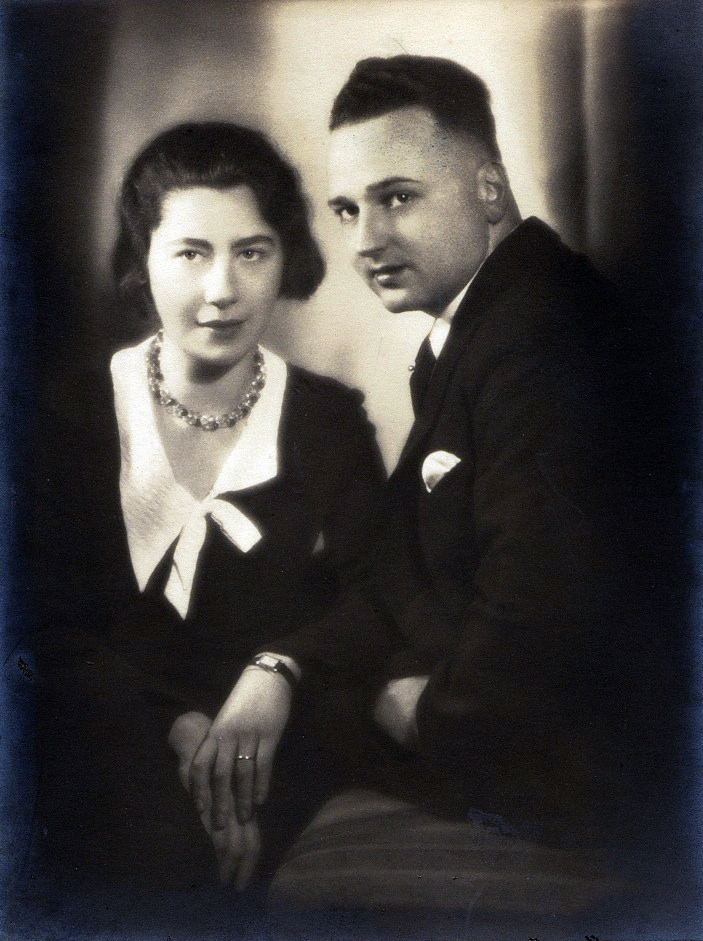
Richard and Hilde Strauss

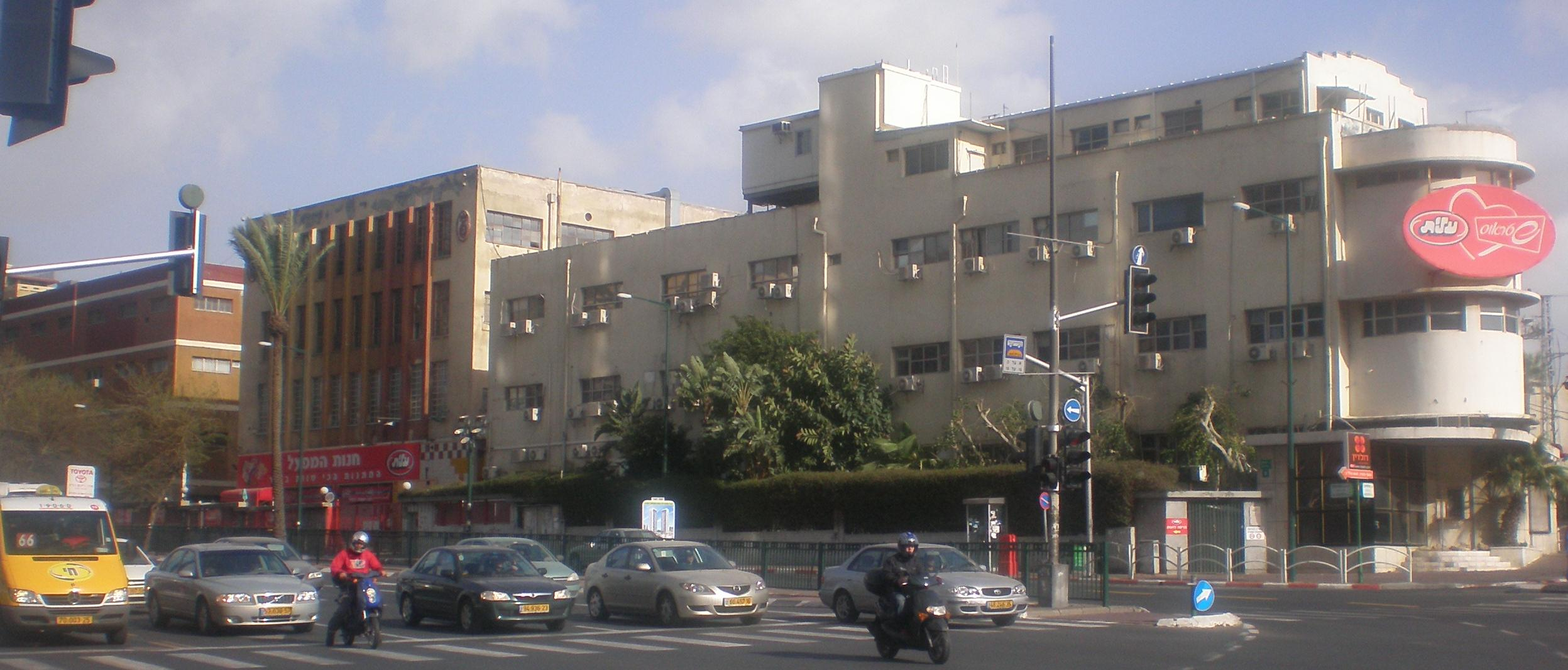
Elite factory, Ramat Gan

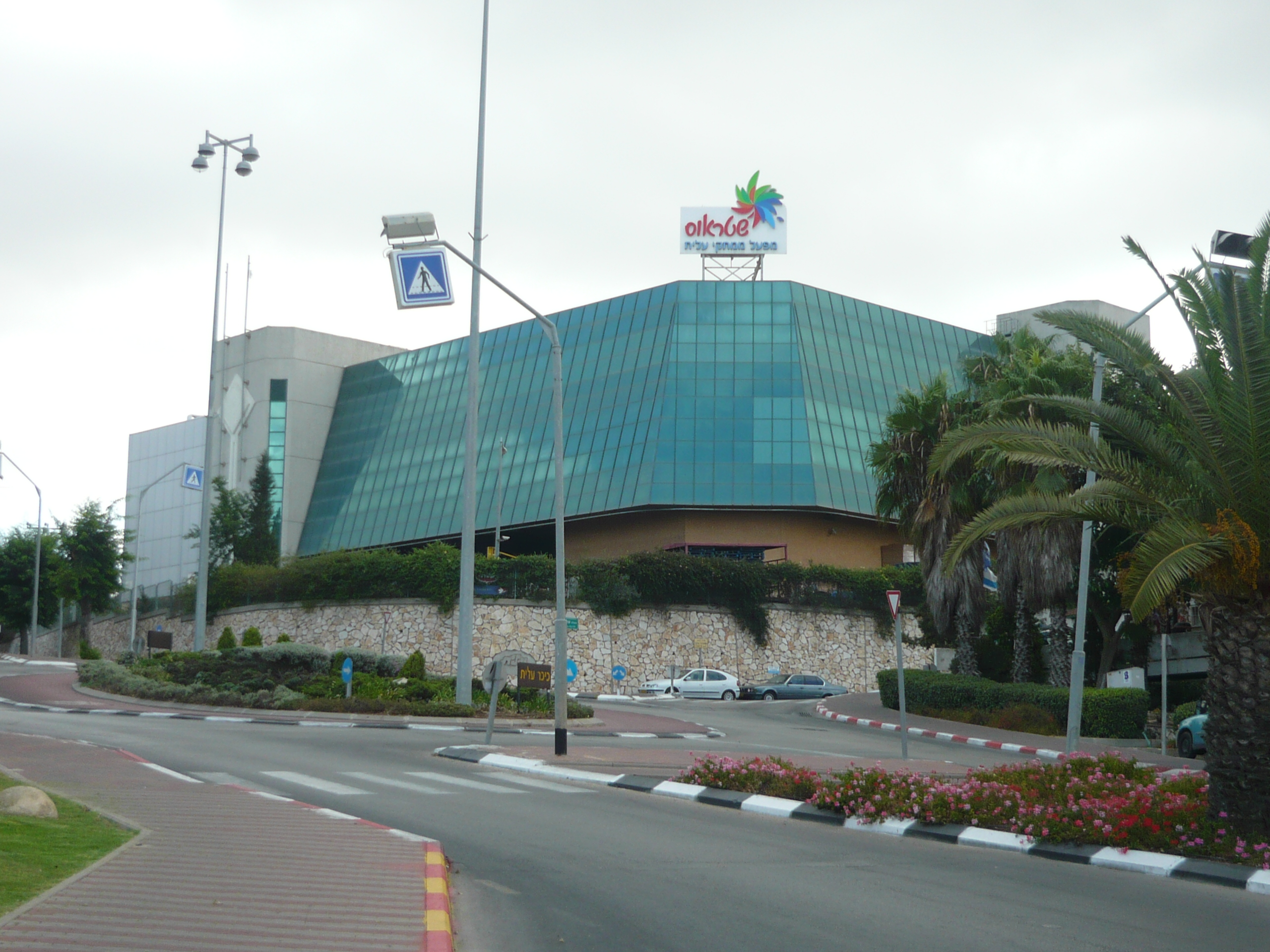
Strauss-Elite's factory in Nof HaGalil

Strauss Group Ltd. (Hebrew: שטראוס גרופ בע״מ), formerly known as Strauss-Elite (שטראוס עלית), is an Israeli manufacturer and marketer of consumer foods sold through retail stores. It is among the largest food manufacturers in Israel. Strauss Group focuses on dairy products, coffee, water, snacks, salads, and dips. Its subsidiary Strauss Coffee is a coffee company in Eastern Europe and Brazil. Strauss Group is a public company traded in the Tel Aviv Stock Exchange, with the majority of its shares (57%) owned by the Strauss family.

Strauss Group has 15,000 employees worldwide and is active in more than 20 countries.

== History ==
In 1918, Eliyahu Fromenchenko (also spelled Fromchenko), a Russian Jew, launched a candy business after preparing confections in his home kitchen. In 1924, after the rise of Communism in the Soviet Union, he moved to Latvia and merged the company with Laima in Riga. In 1933, he sold his stakes in Laima and immigrated to Mandatory Palestine.

=== 1933–2004: Elite ===
Fromenchenko bought property in Ramat Gan and established Elite. Production began in the spring of 1934, with the first product reaching the stores in time for Passover. The company's most popular brand was Shokolad Para, which had an image of a cow (para) on the packaging. As the company grew, factories opened in Safed and Nazareth Illit.

In 1958, Elite launched Israel's first coffee company. Its major competition both for chocolates and coffee was Lieber, which it bought out in March 1970. In 1982, Elite launched its popular "Pesek Zman" line of chocolate bars.

The Israeli snack-food market had been traditionally divided by Elite in the sweets market and Osem in the savoury market. In 1991, Elite decided to expand by entering the salty snack market by establishing a new factory in Sderot and specifically producing "Shush", a copy of the Bamba snack, the most popular snack in Israel made by Osem. Elite became the local licensee of Frito-Lay products, producing the best-selling brand "Tapuchips". Later, Elite started selling coffee outside of Israel, especially in Europe and South America. The initiative, "Café 3 Corações", did not reach its objectives, but it signaled Elite's start as an international company.

Elite was labeled a monopoly by the Israel Antitrust Authority, in the markets of instant coffee, black coffee and chocolate fields, and blamed for abusing its monopoly position. In 2006, Elite–Strauss paid a fine of 5 million NIS, without admission of guilt.

=== 1936–2004: Strauss ===
Richard and Hilde Strauss, German Jews from Nieder-Olm, immigrated in 1936 to Nahariya in the British Mandate of Palestine and started a dairy farm initially with two cows. Excess production that Richard could not sell was made into cheese by Hilde and soon cheese became the main focus of the business. Dessert products followed. In the 1950s, Strauss added ice-cream products, with about 50 employees in their Nahariya factory.

In 1969, after Groupe Danone purchased a part of the company's ownership, Strauss expanded from ice-cream manufacture into puddings and other individual packaged dairy desserts, most popular of which was "Dani" and, about 15 years later, "Milky". In 1975, Michael Strauss, son of the founders, became the CEO of the company.

In 1995, the company went into the prepared-salads business. The Strauss hummus brand, "Achla", became very popular in Israel. In 1997, the company purchased 50% of the ownership of the Yotvata dairy. In the same year, Strauss purchased Elite and grew to over 7,000 employees and a US$1 billion/year turnover, although the formal merger between the companies did not occur until 2004.

In 2001, Ofra Strauss, Michael's daughter, became the CEO of the company. In the same year, it acquired the Max Brenner chain of chocolate cafés with locations across Asia, Australia and the United States.

Strauss was cited by the Israel Antitrust Authority as a monopoly in 2004, a status that essentially places the company under government regulation limiting the way it can change the price of its products to protect the consumer and smaller competitors.

=== 2004–2007: Strauss–Elite ===
Strauss and Elite merged in 2004 to become Strauss–Elite, which, in 2005, acquired control of New York-based Sabra food producing company, to operate as a joint-venture with Frito-Lay, a division of PepsiCo.

In December 2005, Strauss–Elite merged its coffee activity with Santa Clara Indústria e Comércio de Alimentos Ltda in Brazil. The merged company, Santa Clara Participações, is the second largest coffee manufacturer in Brazil.

=== Since 2007: Strauss Group ===
In 2007, the company's name reverted to Strauss with a new corporate logo. Strauss Ice Cream was removed from the Strauss Group portfolio and became private with 51% of the company owned by Unilever, and 49% owned by the Strauss family. Strauss ice creams are marketed under Unilever's Heartbrand in Israel and North America.

The Strauss Group has sold the Max Brenner brand in 2017 to some of the franchisees. In 2022, Strauss Group signed a partnership agreement with Brazil’s São Miguel company to extend their partnership for 20 more years. In 2023, Strauss Group boosted its water business in the UK through its subsidiary, Strauss Water, which has finalized a strategic collaboration with Culligan International.

== Strauss timeline ==
- 1936 – Hilde and Dr. Richard Strauss leave Nazi Germany and arrive with their two-year-old son Peter-Michael at the port of Jaffa port in British Mandate Palestine.
- 1937 – Settling in Nahariya, they buy two cows and plant crops.
- 1939 – They sell their 20-cow cowshed and buy a dairy in Nahariya, purchasing milk from neighboring kibbutzim.
- 1955–1958 – Michael Strauss studies milk technology in Weizmann Institute, Switzerland, and Milkana in Ulm, Germany.
- 1959 – Due to financial difficulties, Israeli Finance Minister Sapir approves a loan.
- 1960 – Michael Strauss imports Gervais cheese to Israel.
- 1962 – Michael Strauss signs an agreement with Gervais, the leading French fresh-cheese producer.
- 1967 – Gervais merges with Danone to become Gervais Danone. Michael wins three awards in the Israel food exhibition for the Camembert cheese, smoked cheese and ice cream
- 1968 – Strauss wins the tastiest product award.
- 1969 – The company partners with Danone, which purchases 28% of Strauss shares. The partnership continues until 1980 when Danone withdraws due to Arab League boycott of Israel.
- 1972 – Strauss builds a new factory in Nahariya and starts production of "Dani."
- 1979 – Strauss starts to market "Milky".
- 1983 – Michael Strauss receives the Israel Prize for Industry.
- Mid 1980s – Strauss purchases Golan dairies.
- 1987 – Michael Strauss is appointed head of the food division of the Israel Manufacturers Association.
- 1995–1998 – Strategic partnerships are made with Uniliver 1995, Danone 1997 and PepsiCo Frito-Lay 1998 and purchases 15% of Elite shares, 50% of Yotvata dairies, and coffee factories in Bulgaria, Croatia, Turkey.
- 1998–2000 – Acquisitions are assimilated.
- 2000 – A new dairy opens in Ahihud to become the most advanced and biggest dairy in the Middle East.
- 2001 – Strauss appoints Ofra Strauss as the CEO, succeeding her father Michael.
- 2001–2003 – Strauss purchases Max Brener, has a marketing agreement with Lavazza, partners with Yad Mordechay and purchases the Salats company.
- 2004 – Strauss and Elite become one company. Strauss becomes publicly traded on the stock market.
- 2005 – It purchases Sabra Salads Company and enters the North America market and also purchases MK Café company in Poland, merging with Santa Clara coffee of Brazil.
- 2006 – It launches Sabra in the United States and purchases Carousels via Sabra.
- 2008 – It partners with PepsiCo for developing and selling dips and spreads in the American market.
- 2010 – It inaugurates a salads factory in Virginia, the largest salads factory worldwide. Tari extends activities to Western Europe, Serbia, Brazil, Mexico and Australia
- 2013 – It becomes one company – Sabra-Obela.
- 2016 – It purchases German coffee factory NDKW Norddeutsche Kaffeewerke GmbH.
- 2017 – It re-purchases TPG shares in Strauss Café.
- 2020 - The death of Michael Strauss

=== Strauss Ice Cream ===
- 1940 – Hilde Strauss experiments with ice cream recipes and develops the Strauss recipe, one that would later become the company's iconic product. Her husband Richard Strauss purchases a milk-pasteurization machine. Raya Strauss is born.
- 1945 – Hilde Strauss's ice cream is introduced in a food exhibition in Tel Aviv.
- 1949 – Strauss ice cream is introduced to the marketplace.
- 1962 – Strauss leases an ice-cream factory in Acre for the production of the Exodus and Tilon ice-cream brands.
- 1968 – Strauss ice cream wins the best-ice-cream award.
- 1978 – Strauss becomes the leading Israeli ice-cream manufacturer.
- 1979 – Strauss purchases Witman Ice Cream.
- 1991 – Strauss establishes the Blue Moon Ice Cream parlors.
- 1995 – In July, a fire breaks out in the factory.
- 1995 – In September, Unilever purchases 50% of the ice-cream company.
- 1996 – The entity merges into Strauss Icecream Ltd.
- 2014 – Unilever becomes the full owner of Strauss Icecream Ltd.

=== Strauss Salads ===
- 1990 – Strauss purchases Mi Va Mi Salads.
- 1991 – “Achla” label salads launched.
- 1992 – Italian Chibby Salads purchased.
- 1995 – Maadaney Olam Salads purchased
- 1998 – PepsiCo Frito-Lay purchases 50% of Elite Mazon, a salty-snacks Elite Company.
- 1999 – Strategic partnership with PepsiCo.
- 2003 – 50% of ANP salads company purchased.
- 2005 – Sabra enters the North American market.
- 2006 – Sabra purchases Carousels.
- 2008 – Partnership with Pepsico for developing and selling dips and spreads in the American market.
- 2010 – Salads factory opened in Virginia, largest salads factory in worldwide. Tari, a PepsiCo and Strauss company extends activities to Western Europe, Serbia, Brazil, Mexico and Australia.
- 2013 – Strauss becomes Sabra-Obela.

== See also ==
- Economy of Israel
