= Sussita (car) =

Israeli motor car model

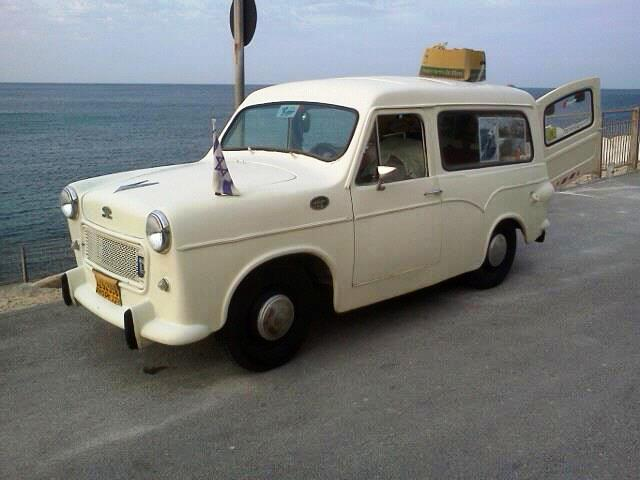
Image of a SUSITA car

The Sussita (Hebrew: סוסיתא) was an Israeli automobile manufactured by Autocars Co. Ltd. between 1960 and 1978, initially in Haifa and later in Tirat Carmel. Produced in station wagon, commercial van, and pickup truck versions, the Sussita became an iconic symbol of early Israeli industry and is now considered a collector's item.

== History ==
The origins of the Sussita trace back to 1952, when Slovak-born Israeli Ladislav (Ladislao) Schneller approached the British automaker Reliant. At the time, Reliant was producing inexpensive three-wheeled utility vehicles for urban transport. Schneller obtained a license to assemble these vehicles in Haifa under the company Garages and Cars Ltd. The workshop was modest, producing only a few dozen units by 1955.

The turning point came when Reliant and its Israeli partner began using fiberglass for the vehicle bodies. This innovation caught the attention of Haifa businessman Yitzhak Shubinsky, who partnered with Schneller, rebranded the company as Autocars, and brought in the Anglo-Israel Automobile Company (the Ford importer) as an additional partner. Shubinsky requested that Reliant develop a four-wheeled light commercial vehicle with a locally made fiberglass body and mechanical components (mostly) from Ford of England.

The first car was produced in September 1958 under the name "Regent IV" for the local market and "Sabra" for export. A station wagon variant released in 1960 was sold in Israel as the "Tzabra." At the end of 1959, Autocars launched a national contest to name the new Israeli car, resulting in 2,355 submissions. The winning name, Sussita, was independently submitted by seven participants. The prize of 500 Israeli lira was awarded to Yosef Shuv, a young agronomy student at the time.

== Early Production and Development ==
The early Sussita models—commercial van and station wagon—were rudimentary, consisting of fiberglass panels joined with wooden strips and a plywood floor. Only 300 units of the 1960 model year were produced, and a government vehicle committee required that one-third be exported.

Later in 1961, three young Israeli journalists took the Sussita on an ambitious African expedition. The journey lasted five months and covered 30,000 kilometers from Israel to Cape Town and back. The Sussita successfully climbed Mount Kilimanjaro up to 3,000 meters—reportedly the highest point accessible by car at the time—and completed the journey with minimal damage, showcasing its durability.

=== Peak Production: The "Cube" ===
The redesigned 1962 Sussita, whose boxy look resembled outdated British cars, earned the nickname "Cube" (קובייה). Production of the Cube ended in summer 1966 with the final pickup model. A total of 8,670 Cube Sussitas were manufactured, making it the most successful model.

In 1962, Autocars expanded its lineup with the Carmel, a two-door compact sedan. Over the next several years, the company introduced affordable work vehicles and even assembled the British Triumph 1300 sedan for families. The Sussita received updates in 1965 and again in 1968 (pickup model).

By 1967, the price of a Sussita 12 Station Wagon stood at 10,970 Israeli lira.

=== The 13/60 and Decline ===
In 1970, the Sussita 13/60 was launched in station wagon, pickup, and sedan (Carmel Dukes) versions. Built on the chassis of the Triumph Herald 13/60, it used the same 1,296cc engine (61 hp) and gearbox. These kits (chassis, engine, transmission, and more) were supplied by Triumph and used in all subsequent models, including under the "Rom Carmel" brand, until production ceased in 1978.

Autocars declared bankruptcy in November 1971. In 1974, a new company called Rom Carmel was established to continue production of Autocars' models. From 1976 to 1978, Rom Carmel manufactured the 1968-model Sussita pickup with a 1,300cc Ford engine. The final Sussita rolled off the line in August 1978. The Rom Carmel plant closed permanently in 1981.

== Legacy ==
Today, the Sussita is a classic car in Israeli automotive history. A persistent urban legend claims that camels were fond of chewing on the car's fiberglass body panels. The history of the Sussita, including its development and eventual decline, was documented in the 2021 Israeli film Sussita, directed by Avi Weissblei.

In October 2024, the Haifa City Museum opened an exhibition titled Sussita, showcasing the full history of the iconic Israeli car, including documentation from its African journey.

Production Numbers

Model	Years	Units Produced
Sussita "Cube"	1961–1966	8,655
Sussita 12 (Station/Sedan)	1964–1970	7,600
Carmel/Sussita Pickup	1967–1975	15,400
Sussita 13/60 (Station/Sedan)	1970–1975	3,300
Rom Carmel	1978–1981	3,759

== See also ==
- Israel economy
- autocars co.
