= Sabra (person) =

Jew born in the Land of Israel

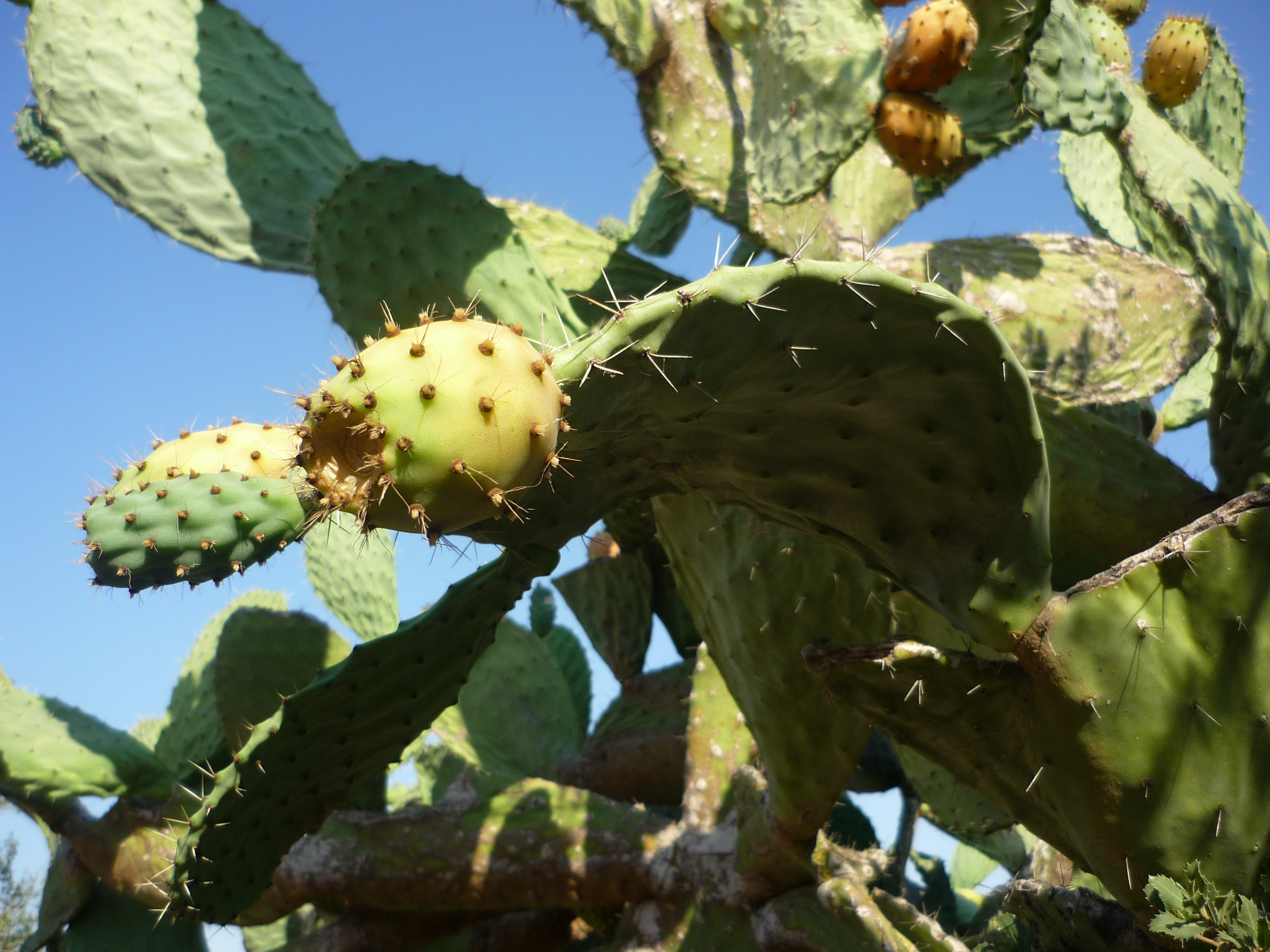
A prickly pear cactus, which is known in Hebrew as "tzabar" or "sabra" (צַבָּר)

In Modern Hebrew, the terms tzabar (sing; צַבָּר) and its plural tzabarim (plur; צַבָּרִים) refer to Jews born in the Land of Israel or the State of Israel. The word is derived from the Hebrew name for the prickly pear cactus (a genus of plants not native to the region), commonly transliterated into English as sabra. The usage of the term became widespread during the 1930s, when it was employed to denote a Jew whose birthplace was within the Land of Israel—corresponding to Ottoman Syria until 1918 (cf. Old Yishuv) and Mandatory Palestine until 1948 (cf. New Yishuv); though the term may have been in use earlier.

The designation sabra is associated with the imagery of the cactus, a plant characterized by its thorny exterior and soft interior. This metaphor has been used to describe Israeli-born Jews as outwardly tough but inwardly gentle.

By 2010, more than 70% of Israeli Jews were sabras. This proportion rose to 75% in 2015 and 80% in 2024.

== History ==
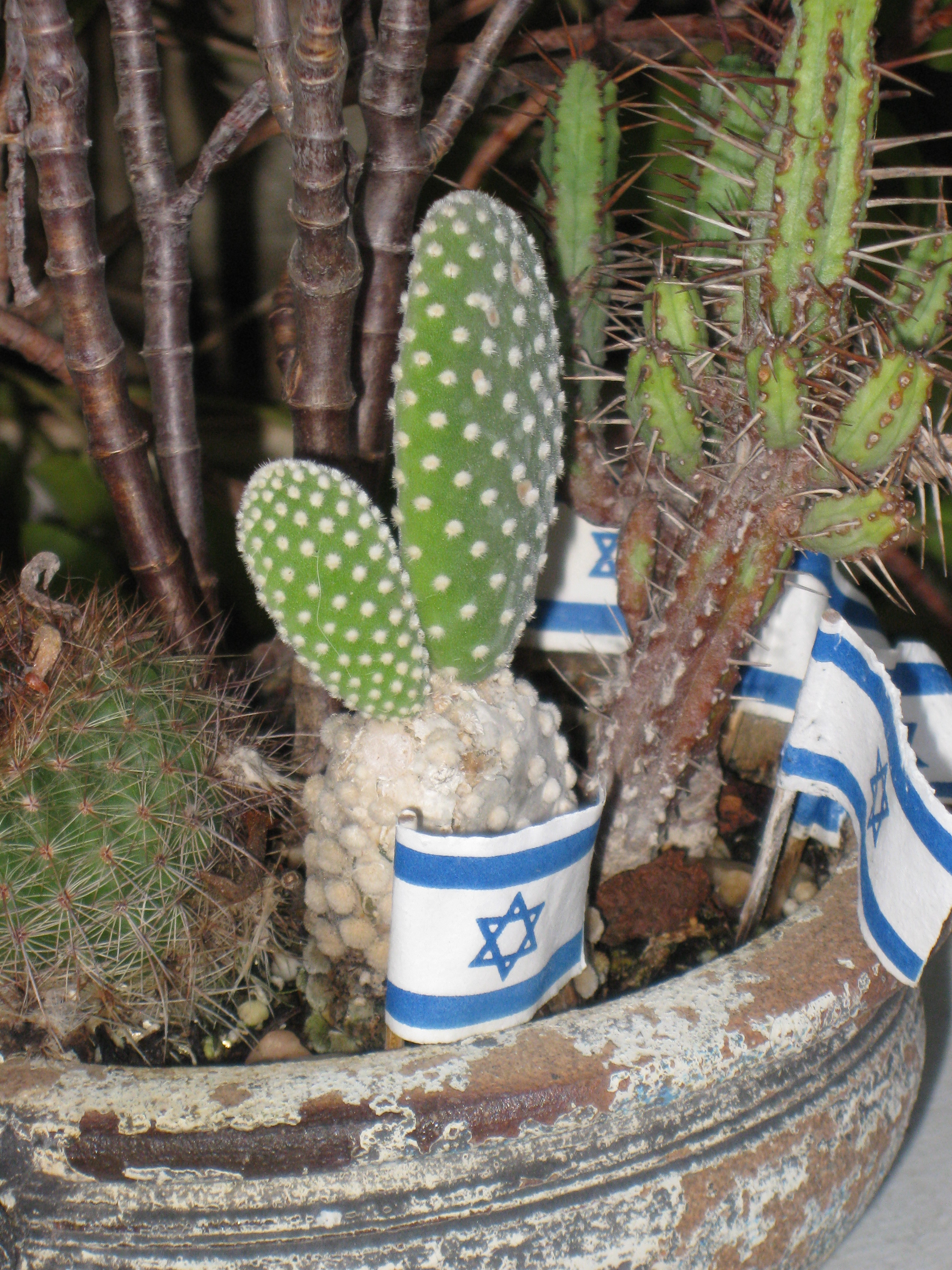
A cactus flowerpot with the flag of Israel

The term sabra came into common use within the Jewish community in mandatory Palestine during the 1930s. Its usage is thought to date back to the early 20th century, when it was applied to the first generation of Hebrew-speaking Jews born in the Levant during the First Aliyah, which began in 1881. This generation referred to themselves as etrogim. The word tzabar was reportedly employed by some immigrants of the Second Aliyah and Third Aliyah, initially in a derogatory sense.

A shift in the meaning of the term occurred with the publication of an essay by journalist Uri Kesari, himself a sabra, who sought to emphasize positive qualities associated with the sabra. On 18 April 1931, in the newspaper Do'ar HaYom, he published an article titled “We Are the Leaves of the Sabra!”, in which he argued against discrimination directed toward Jews born in mandatory Palestine by more recent immigrants.

According to the 1931 census of Palestine, the Jewish population numbered 174,610, of whom 73,195 (42%) were born in mandatory Palestine.

Sociologist Oz Almog wrote that signs of a distinctive sabra culture appeared as early as World War I, when the children of First Aliyah immigrants began displaying characteristics later associated with the sabra identity. Avshalom Feinberg, born in 1889, has been referred to as "the first sabra". During the 1920s, a new Hebrew culture was visibly developing, and by the 1930s and 1940s the term sabra was in widespread use. Over this period, it acquired increasing prestige, and the sabra emerged as a cultural archetype and hero within the Yishuv and later Israeli society.

Almog described the sabra identity as one that developed particularly among students at Hebrew gymnasiums, residents of kibbutzim and moshavim, members of Zionist youth movements, and fighters in the Palmach. These groups cultivated a shared cultural consciousness along with distinctive symbols and forms of language, dress, and leisure. By the early 1940s, the idea that a new Hebrew nation was emerging was widespread among youth in Tel Aviv.

In November 1948, Arthur Koestler published an article titled "Israel: The Native Generation", in which he contrasted sabras with immigrant Jews, whom he described as a "lost generation". Koestler characterized sabras as "fearless to the point of recklessness, bold, extroverted, and little inclined towards, if not openly contemptuous of, intellectual pursuits", while also describing their worldview as "provincial and hyper-chauvinistic", shaped by the conditions of a settler community engaged in nation-building and constant defense against Arabs.

That same month, following the declaration of Israeli independence earlier in the year, the State of Israel conducted its first census. Of the Jewish population of 716,700, approximately 35% were native-born.

Participation in Zionist youth movements such as HaNoar HaOved VeHaLomed and Hashomer Hatzair, scouting, and compulsory military service were regarded as formative influences on sabra identity.

In the 1950s and subsequent decades, several factors contributed to a decline in the use of the term, including mass immigration of Jews from Middle Eastern and North African countries, the growing influence of Western—particularly American—culture, and the political and social changes following the Six-Day War in 1967 and the Yom Kippur War in 1973. Jews born in Israel after 1948 were often referred to as the Dor haMedina (Hebrew: דור המדינה, “Statehood Generation”), a group commonly described as less defined by Labor Zionism and Israeli nationalism and more influenced by cultural pragmatism and global mass culture.

The large-scale immigration to Israel following the 1948 Arab-Israel war initially reduced the percentage of native-born Jews, which fell from 35% in 1948 to 25% in 1951. As immigration slowed and birthrates among both established and immigrant families rose, the percentage of native-born Jews increased again: reaching 33% in 1956, 38% in 1961, 40% in 1965, and 46% in 1970.

The share of immigrants to natives reached an equilibrium in the mid-1970s and from then on sabras represented a majority of the Jewish population. Sabras were 57% of the Jewish population in 1983 and 61% in 1995.

== In culture ==
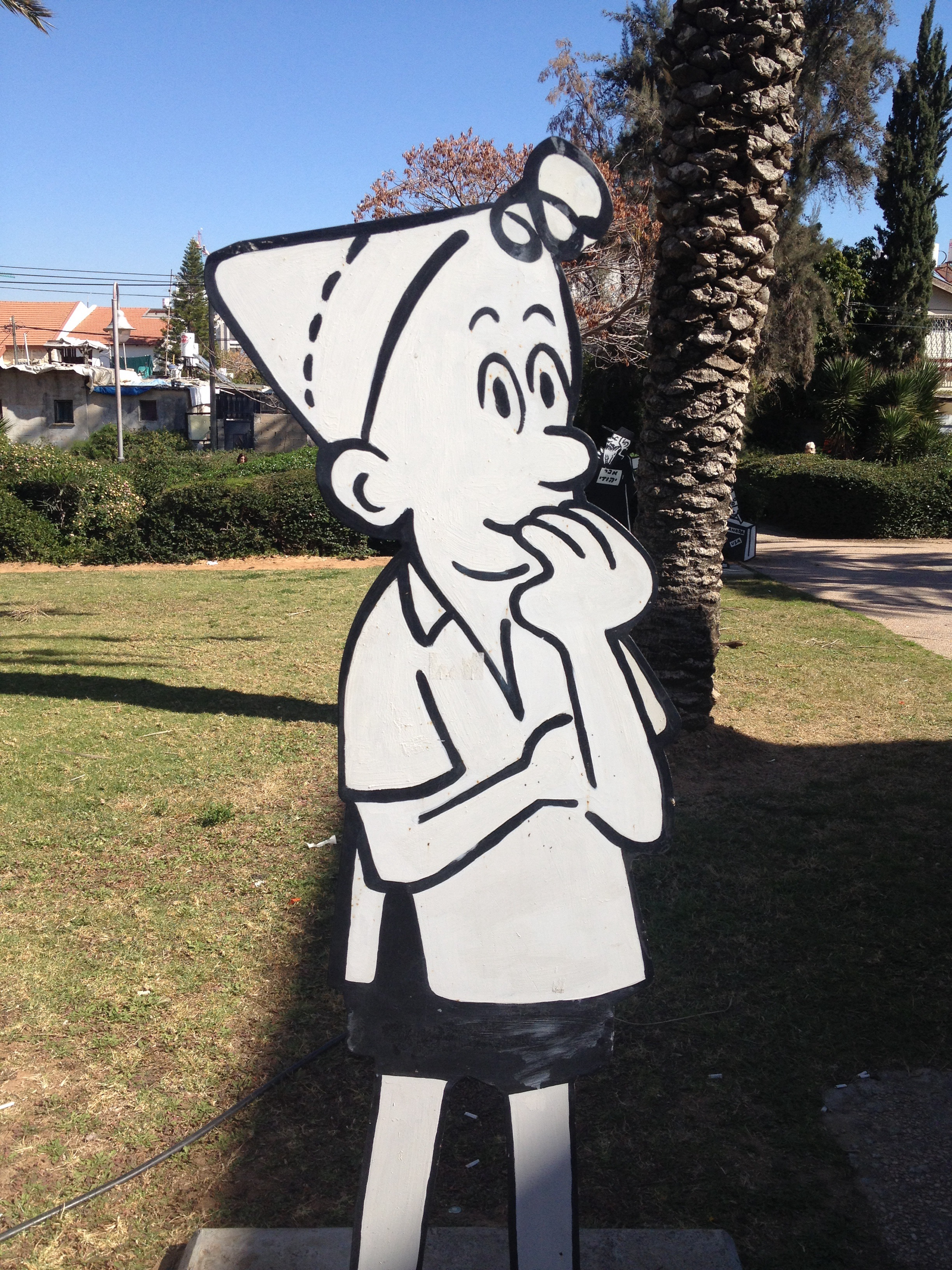
Srulik in the Israeli museum of cartoons and comics in Holon, Israel

The sabra has been represented in Israeli popular culture and symbolism through a variety of artistic forms. One notable example is Srulik, an illustrated character created by cartoonist Kariel Gardosh, depicted wearing shorts, sandals, and a Tembel hat. Srulik has been used as a national personification of the State of Israel. Another figure associated with the sabra image is Kishkashta, a talking anthropomorphic cactus that appeared as a character on Israeli children’s television.

The English transliteration Sabra has also been employed for commercial purposes. Israeli manufacturers used the name to market products abroad as distinctly Israeli, including Sabra liqueur and Sabra Sport, a sports model of the Sussita automobile. As of 2009, the largest hummus manufacturer in the world is the U.S.-based Sabra Dipping Company.

The term has also appeared in international popular culture. On the American television program Saturday Night Live, a 1992 sketch titled “Sabra Price Is Right” featured Tom Hanks. Written by Robert Smigel, the sketch parodied Israeli-born Jews bargaining with contestants who believe they are participating in The Price Is Right. The segment portrayed exaggerated negotiations over faulty consumer goods.

In American comic books, Marvel Comics introduced an Israeli superheroine named Sabra (Ruth Bat-Seraph) during the 1980s. The character has appeared alongside various Marvel superheroes, including the Hulk and the X-Men, and is included in the Marvel Cinematic Universe film Captain America: Brave New World (2025), portrayed by Shira Haas.

== In politics ==
The first sabra to hold the powers of the office of prime minister of Israel was Yigal Allon, who served as acting prime minister from February to March 1969. He was born in Kfar Tavor. The first sabra to serve as prime minister, rather than acting prime minister, was Yitzhak Rabin, who held the office from 1974 to 1977 and again from 1992 to 1995. Since Rabin, six additional sabra prime ministers have served: Benjamin Netanyahu, Ehud Barak, Ariel Sharon, Ehud Olmert, Naftali Bennett and Yair Lapid. Netanyahu was the first Prime Minister who was born in the State of Israel after its establishment in 1948.

The first sabra to serve as president of Israel was Yitzhak Navon, who was born in Jerusalem. Dalia Itzik was the first sabra born after the establishment of the State of Israel to exercise the powers of the presidency, serving as acting president. The first sabra born in the State of Israel to be elected president is Isaac Herzog.

Among other sabra political figures, Avraham Burg was the first Speaker of the Knesset to have been born in the State of Israel, serving from 1999 to 2003.

== See also ==
- Sabra (character)
- Culture of Israel
- Israeli Jews
- Kibbutz
- Moshav
- Muscular Judaism
- Negation of the Diaspora
- Srulik
