= Sabra (company) =

Company that produces Middle Eastern-style food products

Sabra Dipping Company, LLC
- Type: Subsidiary
- Industry: Food
- Predecessor: Sabra-Blue & White Foods
- Founded: 1986; 40 years ago (as Sabra-Blue & White Foods)
- Founders: Zohar Norman; Yehuda Pearl
- Headquarters: White Plains, New York, U.S.
- Key people: Tomer Harpaz (CEO); Paula Fitzgerald (CFO); Jason Levine (Chief Marketing Officer); Stacey Zeltner (CHRO); Colleen Flaherty (Head of Sales); Bryant Michael (VP of Supply Chain); Cherie Floyd (CTO); Meiky Tollman (EVP International)
- Products: Dips and spreads
- Revenue: US$800 million (2016)
- Owner: PepsiCo
- Number of employees: 700 (2024)
- Website: sabra.com

Sabra Dipping Company, LLC is an American company which produces Middle Eastern-style and other food products, including hummus and guacamole. It is wholly owned by PepsiCo. All Sabra products are certified kosher and vegetarian, and are available throughout the U.S. As of 2024, the company held a 36% market share for hummus sales in the United States.

== Growth ==
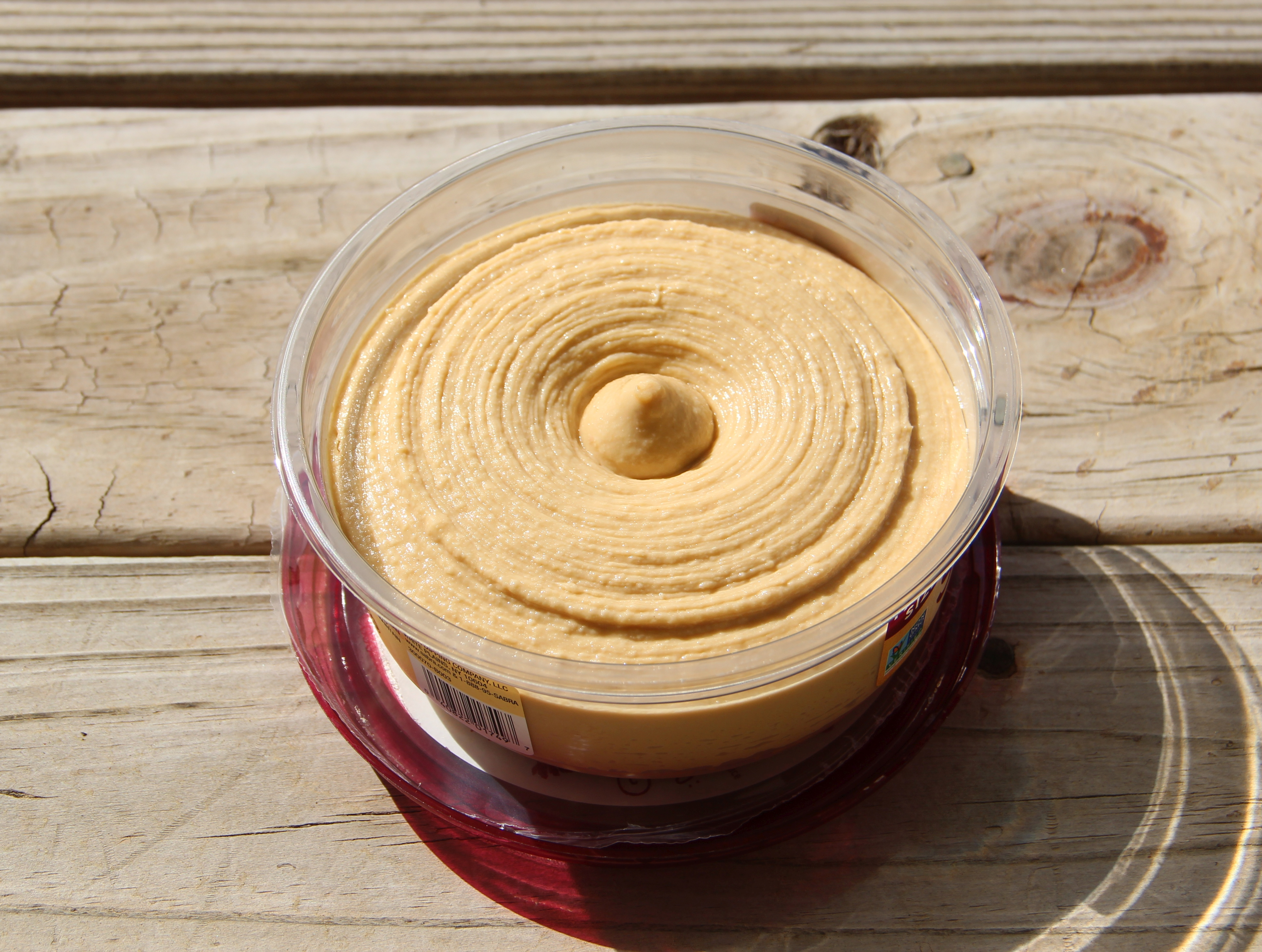
A container of Sabra hummus

The company was founded in 1986 by Zohar Norman and Yehuda Pearl as Sabra-Blue & White Foods. The company was bought in 2005 by Israeli food manufacturer Strauss. Prior to the acquisition by Strauss, Sabra had entered into negotiations to purchase Basha hummus, which was then the leading hummus brand in Detroit. However, the deal never closed successfully, languishing for months until it became clear that Strauss was not interested in acquiring Basha.

In March 2008, Strauss entered a joint-venture partnership with Frito-Lay, a division of the multinational PepsiCo corporation. Strauss owned 50% and PepsiCo 50% of the company. In November 2008, the company announced the construction of a new $61 million plant in Chesterfield County, Virginia, expected to employ 260 people and come on line in mid-2010. The company grew over 50% between August 2008 and August 2009.

By 2016, Sabra had gained a 60% market share of hummus in the United States, and, through its co-ownership and sales channels with PepsiCo, was close to $1 billion in annual sales. To parallel the rising consumer demand for hummus, American farmers have increased their production of chickpeas four-fold since 2009, harvesting more than 100 million pounds (45,000 metric tons) in 2015, up from about 25 million pounds (11,000 metric tons) in 2009.

== Sale to PepsiCo ==
In 2024, Strauss Group announced it was selling its 50% stake in Sabra to PepsiCo.

== Marketing ==
During the run-up to the 2008 U.S. presidential election, Sabra commissioned sculptor Kirk Rademaker to create busts of candidates John McCain, Barack Obama and Hillary Clinton out of 100 pounds of hummus.

Sabra launched its first U.S. national advertising campaign in March 2009, with the StrawberryFrog ad agency. In May 2009, the company began a series of promotional events in which it recreated "Mediterranean villages" in 11 major U.S. cities. By 2015, Sabra had established greater presence among American and Canadian consumers by marketing a "cultural movement" based on a desire for people to experience hummus as an old world food with new tastes close to what they already knew.

== Boycott campaigns ==
Until 2010, the Strauss Group stated on their English-language website that the company donated food packages to the Golani Brigade of the Israel Defense Forces. Activists in the BDS movement called for boycotts of Sabra products over the donations. Student groups at DePaul University, Princeton University, and the University of Ottawa campaigned unsuccessfully to have their schools switch to alternate brands. In 2019, the Dickinson College Student Senate passed a resolution endorsing a ban on Sabra Hummus, though college administrators stated that Dickinson's policy against participating in boycotts would likely prevent the ban from actually taking effect.

== Hummus recalls ==
On April 8, 2015, Sabra recalled 30,000 cases of its classic hummus after a tub in Michigan tested positive for Listeria. Inspectors with the Michigan Department of Agriculture and Rural Development (MDARD) learned of the possible contamination by L. monocytogenes after routine inspections on March 30 at a Kroger in Port Huron, according to MDARD spokeswoman Jennifer Holton.

On November 19, 2016, Sabra voluntarily recalled multiple hummus varieties across the U.S. after Listeria was discovered at one of its manufacturing plants, though the company stated the bacteria had not been found in any of its actual products.

In March 2021, Sabra recalled about 2,100 cases of 10 oz. Classic Hummus, following a routine inspection by the FDA in the US, due to a possible salmonella contamination. The recall affected 16 states in the U.S.

== See also ==
- List of vegetarian and vegan companies
- Sabra (person)
